= Heart of Midlothian F.C. in European football =

Scottish club in European football

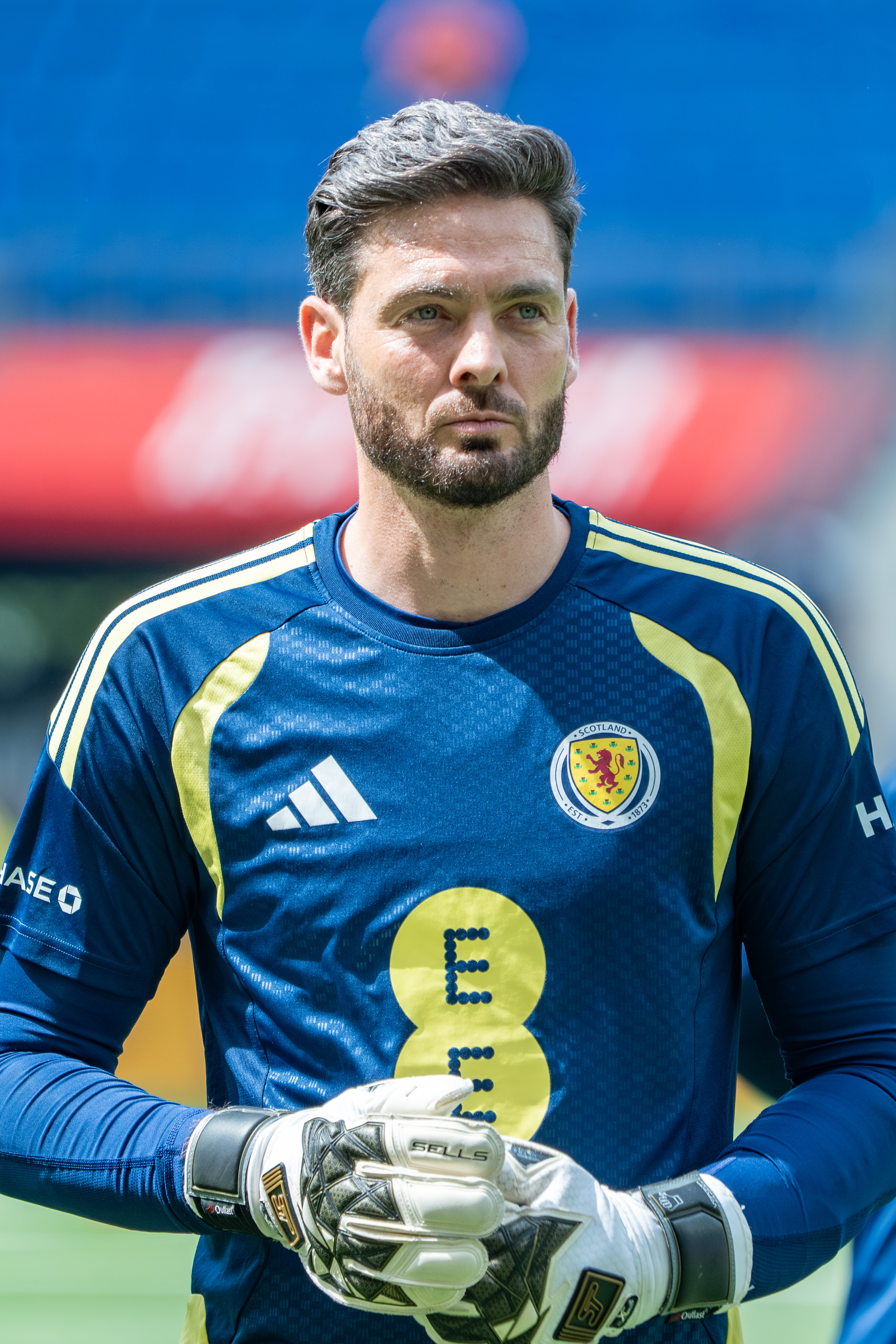
- Craig Gordon holds the appearances record for Hearts in European matches with 30
- Club: Heart of Midlothian F.C.
- Seasons played: 26
- First entry: 1958–59 European Cup
- Latest entry: 2026–27 UEFA Conference League

Titles
- Champions League: 0 (Best: Preliminary rounds)
- Europa League: 0 (Best: Quarter-final)
- Cup Winners' Cup: 0 (Best: Second round)
- Conference League: 0 (Best: Group stage)

Heart of Midlothian F.C. played their first official match in competitive European football on 3 September 1958; losing 5–1 against Standard Liège in the European Cup. This made the club only the third Scottish and fifth British team to compete in Europe at the time. Hearts have been beaten on two occasions by the club who would go on to win the competition (Note: Benfica in the 1960–61 European Cup and Hamburger SV in the 1976–77 European Cup Winners' Cup.) and have also lost twice to the eventual runners–up. (Note: Real Zaragoza in the 1965–66 Inter-Cities Fairs Cup and Mallorca in the 1998–99 UEFA Cup Winners' Cup.)

Hearts' best showing in European competition was in the 1988–89 UEFA Cup, where they reached the quarter–finals and narrowly lost 2–1 on aggregate to German giants Bayern Munich. Since then, Hearts became both the first–ever Scottish club and the first–ever British club to reach the new group stage format of the 2004–05 UEFA Cup (now the UEFA Europa League). They also qualified for the 2006–07 UEFA Champions League, becoming the first non Old Firm team in Scotland to do so since the tournament changed from the European Cup to the Champions League.

The club used to hold an unfortunate record of having never progressed through a tie which has finished level on aggregate after two legs. They lost play–off matches by a single goal to Lausanne–Sport in the 1963–64 Inter-Cities Fairs Cup and to eventual runners–up Real Zaragoza in the 1965–66 Inter-Cities Fairs Cup, and they lost due to the away goals rule against Dukla Prague, Red Star Belgrade and Stuttgart in the 1986–87 UEFA Cup, 1996–97 UEFA Cup Winners' Cup, and 2000–01 UEFA Cup respectively. The club has often featured in Europe in the 21st century, though these have largely been appearances in qualifying rounds. Nevertheless, Hearts were drawn in Group A of the 2004–05 UEFA Cup and appeared in the group and league stages of the UEFA Conference League in 2022–23, 2024–25 and 2026–27. They reached the latter after a victory on penalties against Rapid Wien, breaking their aforementioned play-off record in the process.

Goalkeeper Craig Gordon currently holds the record of playing in the most European matches for Hearts, making 30 appearances from 2001 to 2024. John Robertson, with seven goals, is the club's top scorer in European competitions.

== Statistics ==
=== Results ===
Note: In all cases the Hearts score is listed first.

List of Hearts games in European competitions
Season	Competition	Round	Opponent	Home	Away	Other	Agg.	(Note: Round or group progressed or eliminated)	Notes
1958–59	European Cup	PR	(Belgium) Standard Liège	2–1	1–5	—N/a	3–6		—N/a
1960–61	European Cup	PR	(Portugal) Benfica	1–2	0–3	—N/a	1–5		—N/a
1961–62	Fairs Cup	R1	(Belgium) Union Saint–Gilloise	2–0	3–1	—N/a	5–1		—N/a
1961–62	Fairs Cup	R2	(Italy) Inter Milan	0–1	0–4	—N/a	0–5		—N/a
1963–64	Fairs Cup	R1	(Switzerland) Lausanne–Sport	2–2	2–2	2–3	6–7		Playoff
1965–66	Fairs Cup	R2	(Norway) Vålerenga	1–0	3–1	—N/a	4–1		—N/a
1965–66	Fairs Cup	R3	(Spain) Real Zaragoza	3–3	2–2	0–1	5–6		Playoff
1976–77	Cup Winners' Cup	R1	(East Germany) Lokomotive Leipzig	5–1	0–2	—N/a	5–3		—N/a
1976–77	Cup Winners' Cup	R2	(West Germany) Hamburg	1–4	2–4	—N/a	3–8		—N/a
1984–85	UEFA Cup	R1	(France) Paris Saint–Germain	2–2	0–4	—N/a	2–6		—N/a
1986–87	UEFA Cup	R1	(Czechoslovakia) Dukla Prague	3–2	0–1	—N/a	3–3		Away goals
1988–89	UEFA Cup	R1	(Republic of Ireland) St. Patrick's Athletic	2–0	2–0	—N/a	4–0		—N/a
1988–89	UEFA Cup	R2	Austria Vienna	0–0	1–0	—N/a	1–0		—N/a
1988–89	UEFA Cup	R3	(Socialist Federal Republic of Yugoslavia) Velež Mostar	3–0	1–2	—N/a	4–2		—N/a
1988–89	UEFA Cup	QF	(West Germany) Bayern Munich	1–0	0–2	—N/a	1–2		—N/a
1990–91	UEFA Cup	R1	(Soviet Union) Dnipro Dnipropetrovsk	3–1	1–1	—N/a	4–2		—N/a
1990–91	UEFA Cup	R2	(Italy) Bologna	3–1	0–3	—N/a	3–4		—N/a
1992–93	UEFA Cup	R1	(Czechoslovakia) Slavia Prague	4–2	0–1	—N/a	4–3		—N/a
1992–93	UEFA Cup	R2	(Belgium) Standard Liège	0–1	0–1	—N/a	0–2		—N/a
1993–94	UEFA Cup	R1	(Spain) Atlético Madrid	2–1	0–3	—N/a	2–4		—N/a
1996–97	Cup Winners' Cup	QR	(Serbia and Montenegro) Red Star Belgrade	1–1	0–0	—N/a	1–1		Away goals
1998–99	Cup Winners' Cup	QR	(Estonia) Lantana Tallinn	5–0	1–0	—N/a	6–0		—N/a
1998–99	Cup Winners' Cup	R1	(Spain) Real Mallorca	0–1	1–1	—N/a	1–2		—N/a
2000–01	UEFA Cup	QR	(Iceland) ÍBV Vestmannaeyjar	3–0	2–0	—N/a	5–0		—N/a
2000–01	UEFA Cup	R1	(Germany) Stuttgart	3–2	0–1	—N/a	3–3		Away goals
2003–04	UEFA Cup	R1	(Bosnia and Herzegovina) Zeljeznicar	2–0	0–0	—N/a	2–0		—N/a
2003–04	UEFA Cup	R2	(France) Bordeaux	0–2	1–0	—N/a	1–2		—N/a
2004–05	UEFA Cup	R1	(Portugal) Braga	3–1	2–2	—N/a	5–3		—N/a
2004–05	UEFA Cup	Group A	(Netherlands) Feyenoord	—N/a	0–3	—N/a	5th		—N/a
2004–05	UEFA Cup	Group A	(Germany) Schalke 04	0–1	—N/a	—N/a	5th		—N/a
2004–05	UEFA Cup	Group A	(Switzerland) Basel	—N/a	2–1	—N/a	5th		—N/a
2004–05	UEFA Cup	Group A	(Hungary) Ferencváros	0–1	—N/a	—N/a	5th		—N/a
2006–07	Champions League	QR2	(Bosnia and Herzegovina) Široki Brijeg	3–0	0–0	—N/a	3–0		—N/a
2006–07	Champions League	QR3	(Greece) AEK Athens	1–2	0–3	—N/a	1–5		—N/a
2006–07	UEFA Cup	R1	(Czech Republic) Sparta Prague	0–2	0–0	—N/a	0–2		—N/a
2009–10	Europa League	PO	(Croatia) Dinamo Zagreb	2–0	0–4	—N/a	2–4		—N/a
2011–12	Europa League	QR3	(Hungary) Paks	4–1	1–1	—N/a	5–2		—N/a
2011–12	Europa League	PO	(England) Tottenham Hotspur	0–5	0–0	—N/a	0–5		—N/a
2012–13	Europa League	PO	(England) Liverpool	0–1	1–1	—N/a	1–2		—N/a
2016–17	Europa League	QR1	(Estonia) Infonet Tallinn	2–1	4–2	—N/a	6–3		—N/a
2016–17	Europa League	QR2	(Malta) Birkirkara	1–2	0–0	—N/a	1–2		—N/a
2022–23	Europa League	PO	(Switzerland) Zürich	0–1	1–2	—N/a	1–3		—N/a
2022–23	Conference League	Group A	(Italy) Fiorentina	0–3	1–5	—N/a	3rd		—N/a
2022–23	Conference League	Group A	(Turkey) İstanbul Başakşehir	0–4	1–3	—N/a	3rd		—N/a
2022–23	Conference League	Group A	(Latvia) RFS	2–1	2–0	—N/a	3rd		—N/a
2023–24	Conference League	QR3	(Norway) Rosenborg	3–1	1–2	—N/a	4–3		—N/a
2023–24	Conference League	PO	(Greece) PAOK	1–2	0–4	—N/a	1–6		—N/a
2024–25	Europa League	PO	(Czech Republic) Viktoria Plzeň	0–1	0–1	—N/a	0–2		—N/a
2024–25	Conference League	League Phase	(Belarus) Dinamo Minsk	—N/a	2–1	—N/a	25th		—N/a
2024–25	Conference League	League Phase	(Cyprus) Omonoia	2–0	—N/a	—N/a	25th		—N/a
2024–25	Conference League	League Phase	(Germany) 1. FC Heidenheim	0–2	—N/a	—N/a	25th		—N/a
2024–25	Conference League	League Phase	(Belgium) Cercle Brugge	—N/a	0–2	—N/a	25th		—N/a
2024–25	Conference League	League Phase	(Denmark) Copenhagen	—N/a	0–2	—N/a	25th		—N/a
2024–25	Conference League	League Phase	(Moldova) Petrocub	2–2	—N/a	—N/a	25th		—N/a
2026–27	Champions League	QR2	(Austria) Sturm Graz	0–2	0–4	—N/a	0–6		—N/a
2026–27	Europa League	QR3	(Portugal) Benfica	1–1	1–6	—N/a	2–7		—N/a
2026–27	Conference League	PO	(Austria) Rapid Wien	2–2	2–2	—N/a	4–4 (Note: 2–2 a.e.t.; Hearts won 4–3 on penalties)		—N/a
2026–27	Conference League	League Phase	(Denmark) Nordsjælland	1–1	—N/a	—N/a	TBD		—N/a
2026–27	Conference League	League Phase	(Turkey) Trabzonspor	—N/a	0–2	—N/a	TBD		—N/a
2026–27	Conference League	League Phase	(Switzerland) Thun	—N/a	1–3	—N/a	TBD		—N/a
2026–27	Conference League	League Phase	Monaco (Note: AS Monaco play in France's Ligue 1)		—N/a	—N/a	TBD		—N/a
2026–27	Conference League	League Phase	(Bosnia and Herzegovina) Borac Banja Luka		—N/a	—N/a	TBD		—N/a
2026–27	Conference League	League Phase	(Cyprus) Pafos	—N/a		—N/a	TBD		—N/a

=== By competition ===
Competition	Pld	W	D	L	GF	GA	GD
UEFA Champions League/European Cup	10	2	1	7	8	22	−14
UEFA Europa League/UEFA Cup	46	21	11	24	64	74	−10
UEFA Conference League	18	5	3	10	21	38	–17
UEFA Cup Winners' Cup	10	3	3	4	16	14	+2
Inter-Cities Fairs Cup	12	4	4	4	20	20	0
Total	106	35	22	49	129	168	−39

=== Most appearances ===
Rank	Player	Career	Apps
1	(Scotland) Craig Gordon	2001–2007; 2020–2026	30
2	(Scotland) Henry Smith	1981–1996	22
2	(Scotland) Steven Pressley	1998–2006	22
4	(Scotland) Gary Mackay	1980–1997	21
5	(Scotland) John Colquhoun	1985–1991; 1993–1997	18
6	(Scotland) Robbie Neilson	1999–2009	16
6	(Scotland) John Cumming	1950–1967	16
8	(Scotland) Dave McPherson	1987–1992; 1994–1999	15
8	(Scotland) John Robertson	1981–1988; 1988–1998	15
8	(Scotland) Craig Levein	1983–1997	15
8	(Scotland) Eamonn Bannon	1976–1979; 1988–1993	15
8	(Scotland) Lawrence Shankland	2022–2026	15

=== Top scorers ===
Rank	Player	Career	Goals
1	(Scotland) John Robertson	1981–1988; 1988–1998	7
2	(Scotland) Lawrence Shankland	2022–2026	6
3	(Scotland) Mike Galloway	1987–1989	5
3	(Scotland) Willie Wallace	1961–1966	5
5	(Netherlands) Mark de Vries	2002–2005	4
5	(England) Wayne Foster	1986–1994	4
