= 1987–88 Heart of Midlothian F.C. season =

Heart of Midlothian
1987–88 season
- Chairman: Wallace Mercer
- Manager: Alex MacDonald; Sandy Jardine
- Stadium: Tynecastle Stadium
- Scottish Premier Division: 2nd
- Scottish Cup: Semi-final
- League Cup: Quarter-final
- East of Scotland Shield: Winner
- Top goalscorer: League: John Robertson (26); All: John Robertson (31)
- Highest home attendance: 28,992 v Hibs 2 January 1988 & V Celtic 7 November 1987 Scottish Premier Division
- Lowest home attendance: 7,307 v Dunfermline Athletic 13 April 1988 Scottish Premier Division
- Average home league attendance: 16,633

The 1987–88 season was Heart of Midlothian F.C.'s 5th consecutive season of play in the Scottish Premier Division. Hearts also competed in the Scottish Cup and the Scottish League Cup.

== Fixtures ==
=== Friendlies ===
| 18 July 1987 Friendly | Homburg | 2–1 | Hearts |
| | Goal | | Andy Watson 83' | Attendance: 1,800 |

| 22 July 1987 Friendly | Preußen Münster | 0–2 | Hearts |
| | | | Gary Mackay; Andy Watson | Attendance: 300 |

| 24 July 1987 Friendly | Eintracht Bad Kreuznach | 1–3 | Hearts |
| | 85' | | Allan Moore 25'; Andy Watson 56'; Sandy Clark 90' | Attendance: 250 |

| 25 July 1987 Friendly | SC Birkenfeld | 1–1 | Hearts |
| | Goal | | Gary Mackay 66' | Attendance: 450 |

| 27 July 1987 Friendly | Remscheid | 2–1 | Hearts |
| | Goal | | John Robertson 65' (pen.) | Attendance: 300 |

| 1 August 1987 Friendly | Berwick Rangers | 1–2 | Hearts |
| | Mark Main 53' | | Dave McPherson 19'; John Robertson 84' | Attendance: 1,200 |

| 3 August 1987 Friendly | Hearts | 0–1 | Newcastle |
| | | | Paul Gascoigne 86' | Attendance: 10,113 |

| 29 September 1987 Friendly | Inverness | 3–4 | Hearts |
| | Polworth; Hercher | | Hugh Burns; Sandy Clark; John Robertson; John Colquhoun | Attendance: 2,500 |

=== League Cup ===
| 19 August 1987 League Cup R2 | Hearts | 6–1 | Kilmarnock | Tynecastle Stadium |
| | Dave McPherson 24'; Sandy Clark 39' 59'; Gary Mackay 81'; Neil Berry 88'; Wayne Foster 89' | | Ian Bryson 66' (pen.) | Attendance: 9,188 |

| 25 August 1987 League Cup R3 | Hearts | 2–0 | Clyde | Tynecastle Stadium |
| | John Robertson 32' 83' (pen.) | | | Attendance: 11,711 |

| 2 September 1987 League Cup QF | Rangers | 4–1 | Hearts | Ibrox Stadium |
| | Iain Durrant 21' 23'; Ally McCoist 43' 89' (pen.) | | John Robertson 49' | Attendance: 40,920 |

=== Scottish Cup ===
| 30 January 1988 Scottish Cup R3 | Falkirk | 1–3 | Hearts | Brockville Park |
| | Stuart Romaines 40' | | John Robertson 43' 52'; Wayne Foster 70' | Attendance: 16,000 |

| 20 February 1988 Scottish Cup R4 | Hearts | 2–0 | Morton | Tynecastle Stadium |
| | Sandy Clark 41'; Gary Mackay 75' | | | Attendance: 13,646 |

| 12 March 1988 Scottish Cup QF | Hearts | 3–0 | Dunfermline | Tynecastle Stadium |
| | John Colquhoun 27'; Wayne Foster 42'; Gary Mackay | | | Attendance: 21,969 |

| 9 April 1988 Scottish Cup SF | Celtic | 2– 1 | Hearts | Hampden Park |
| | Mark McGhee 88'; Andy Walker 91' | | Brian Whittaker 60' | Attendance: 66,466 |

=== East of Scotland Shield ===
| 8 May 1988 East of Scotland Shield | Hearts | 5–1 | Hibs |
| | Neil Berry; Allan Moore; Sean Docherty | | Goal | Attendance: 400 |

=== Scottish Premier Division ===
| 8 August 1987 Scottish Premier Division | Hearts | 4–2 | Falkirk | Tynecastle Stadium |
| | John Colquhoun 1'; Sandy Clark 9'; John Robertson 43' 79' | | Stuart Burgess 72'; Crawford Baptie 77' | Attendance: 12,163 |

| 12 August 1987 Scottish Premier Division | Celtic | 1–0 | Hearts | Celtic Park |
| | Mark McGhee 86' | | | Attendance: 27,825 |

| 15 August 1987 Scottish Premier Division | St Mirren | 1–1 | Hearts | Love Street |
| | Paul Lambert 66' (pen.) | | John Robertson 38' (pen.) | Attendance: 7,408 |

| 22 August 1987 Scottish Premier Division | Hearts | 4–1 | Dundee United | Tynecastle Stadium |
| | John Robertson 21' (pen.); Sandy Clark 36' 77'; Iain Jardine 50' | | Iain Ferguson 87' | Attendance: 14,548 |

| 29 August 1987 Scottish Premier Division | Hearts | 1–0 | Hibs | Tynecastle Stadium |
| | John Robertson 6' | | | Attendance: 24,496 |

| 5 September 1987 Scottish Premier Division | Morton | 1–2 | Hearts | Cappielow |
| | John McNeil 88' (pen.) | | John Colquhoun 10'; John Robertson 32' (pen.) | Attendance: 5,143 |

| 12 September 1987 Scottish Premier Division | Hearts | 1–0 | Motherwell | Tynecastle Stadium |
| | Allan Moore 44' | | | Attendance: 11,488 |

| 19 September 1987 Scottish Premier Division | Dundee | 1–3 | Hearts | Dens Park |
| | J. Smith 88' | | John Colquhoun 1' 50'; John Robertson 90' (pen.) | Attendance: 9,199 |

| 26 September 1987 Scottish Premier Division | Dunfermline | 0–1 | Hearts | East End Park |
| | | | John Colquhoun 36' | Attendance: 13,873 |

| 3 October 1987 Scottish Premier Division | Hearts | 0–0 | Rangers | Tynecastle Stadium |
| | | | | Attendance: 28,906 |

| 7 October 1987 Scottish Premier Division | Hearts | 2–1 | Aberdeen | Tynecastle Stadium |
| | John Robertson 13'; Dave McPherson 16' | | James Bett (pen.) | Attendance: 17,843 |

| 10 October 1987 Scottish Premier Division | Falkirk | 1–5 | Hearts | Brockville Park |
| | Robert Stewart | | John Colquhoun; Iain Jardine; John Robertson (pen.); Wayne Foster | Attendance: 9,300 |

| 17 October 1987 Scottish Premier Division | Hibs | 2–1 | Hearts | Easter Road |
| | Eddie May 5'; Paul Kane 41' | | John Robertson 15' | Attendance: 23,390 |

| 24 October 1987 Scottish Premier Division | Hearts | 3–0 | Morton | Tynecastle Stadium |
| | Kenny Black; Gary Mackay | | | Attendance: 11,516 |

| 27 October 1987 Scottish Premier Division | Motherwell | 0–3 | Hearts | Fir Park |
| | | | Wayne Foster; John Robertson (pen.); Mark Caughey (og.) | Attendance: 6,493 |

| 31 October 1987 Scottish Premier Division | Hearts | 4–2 | Dundee | Tynecastle Stadium |
| | John Robertson 15' 17'; John Colquhoun 34'; Kenny Black 74' | | Thomas Coyne 60'; Keith Wright 87' | Attendance: 13,806 |

| 7 November 1987 Scottish Premier Division | Hearts | 1–1 | Celtic | Tynecastle Stadium |
| | John Colquhoun 39' | | Mark McGhee 79' | Attendance: 28,992 |

| 14 November 1987 Scottish Premier Division | Aberdeen | 0–0 | Hearts | Pittodrie Stadium |
| | | | | Attendance: 19,302 |

| 18 November 1987 Scottish Premier Division | Dundee United | 0–3 | Hearts | Tannadice Park |
| | | | John Robertson 31' 39'; Wayne Foster 65' | Attendance: 14,260 |

| 21 November 1987 Scottish Premier Division | Hearts | 0–0 | St Mirren | Tynecastle Stadium |
| | | | | Attendance: 14,879 |

| 24 November 1987 Scottish Premier Division | Hearts | 3–2 | Dunfermline | Tynecastle Stadium |
| | John Robertson 10'; Dave McPherson 84'; Sandy Clark 88' | | Craig Robertson 49'; Burns 64' (og.) | Attendance: 14,157 |

| 28 November 1987 Scottish Premier Division | Rangers | 3–2 | Hearts | Ibrox Stadium |
| | Robert Fleck 28'; Craig Levein 41' (og.); Ian Durrant 74' | | Mike Galloway 36'; John Robertson 61' | Attendance: 43,557 |

| 5 December 1987 Scottish Premier Division | Hearts | 1–0 | Falkirk | Tynecastle Stadium |
| | John Robertson 36' | | | Attendance: 12,729 |

| 12 December 1987 Scottish Premier Division | Celtic | 2–2 | Hearts | Celtic Park |
| | Andy Walker 81' (pen.); Paul McStay 87' | | John Robertson 22'; Mike Galloway 74' | Attendance: 42,004 |

| 16 December 1987 Scottish Premier Division | Hearts | 1–1 | Motherwell | Tynecastle Stadium |
| | Gary Mackay 36' | | Steven Cowan 5' | Attendance: 9,407 |

| 19 December 1987 Scottish Premier Division | Dundee | 0–0 | Hearts | Dens Park |
| | | | | Attendance: 10,788 |

| 26 December 1987 Scottish Premier Division | Greenock Morton | 0–0 | Hearts | Cappielow |
| | | | | Attendance: 6,726 |

| 2 January 1988 Scottish Premier Division | Hearts | 0–0 | Hibs | Tynecastle Stadium |
| | | | | Attendance: 28,992 |

| 9 January 1988 Scottish Premier Division | Dunfermline | 0–4 | Hearts | East End Park |
| | | | John Robertson 46' 56'; John Colquhoun 68'; Mike Galloway 83' | Attendance: 11,963 |

| 16 January 1988 Scottish Premier Division | Hearts | 1–1 | Rangers | Tynecastle Stadium |
| | Sandy Clark 77' | | Iain Durrant 54' (pen.) | Attendance: 28,967 |

| 3 February 1988 Scottish Premier Division | Hearts | 1–1 | Dundee United | Tynecastle Stadium |
| | Gary Mackay 77' | | Ian Redford 51' (pen.) | Attendance: 13,710 |

| 6 February 1988 Scottish Premier Division | St Mirren | 0–6 | Hearts | Love Street |
| | | | John Robertson 23' (pen.) 52'; John Colquhoun 40' 41' 62'; Wayne Foster 47' | Attendance: 6,659 |

| 13 February 1988 Scottish Premier Division | Hearts | 2–2 | Aberdeen | Tynecastle Stadium |
| | Sandy Clark 43'; John Robertson 55' (pen.) | | James Bett 6'; Tommy Jones 90' | Attendance: 18,817 |

| 27 February 1988 Scottish Premier Division | Falkirk | 2–0 | Hearts | Brockville Park |
| | Crawford Baptie; Samuel McGivern 55' | | | Attendance: 8,819 |

| 8 March 1988 Scottish Premier Division | Motherwell | 0–2 | Hearts | Fir Park |
| | | | John Colquhoun 42'; John Robertson 65' | Attendance: 6,488 |

| 19 March 1988 Scottish Premier Division | Hibs | 0–0 | Hearts | Easter Road |
| | | | | Attendance: 20,870 |

| 26 March 1988 Scottish Premier Division | Hearts | 2–0 | Greenock Morton | Tynecastle Stadium |
| | Mike Galloway 62' 89' | | | Attendance: 8,787 |

| 30 March 1988 Scottish Premier Division | Hearts | 2–0 | Dundee | Tynecastle Stadium |
| | Kenny Black 22'; John Colquhoun 84' | | | Attendance: 9,649 |

| 2 April 1988 Scottish Premier Division | Rangers | 1–2 | Hearts | Ibrox Stadium |
| | Jan Bartram 25' | | Dave McPherson 66'; John Robertson 83' (pen.) | Attendance: 41,125 |

| 13 April 1988 Scottish Premier Division | Hearts | 2–1 | Dunfermline | Tynecastle Stadium |
| | Mike Galloway 26'; Gary Mackay 71' | | Stephen Morrison 5' | Attendance: 7,307 |

| 16 April 1988 Scottish Premier Division | Hearts | 2–1 | Celtic | Tynecastle Stadium |
| | Mike Galloway 26'; Gary Mackay 71' | | Mark McGhee 74' | Attendance: 25,144 |

| 23 April 1988 Scottish Premier Division | Aberdeen | 0–0 | Hearts | Pittodrie Stadium |
| | | | | Attendance: 11,028 |

| 30 April 1988 Scottish Premier Division | Hearts | 0–1 | St Mirren | Tynecastle Stadium |
| | | | Paul Chalmers 72' | Attendance: 9,626 |

| 7 May 1988 Scottish Premier Division | Dundee United | 0–0 | Hearts | Tannadice Park |
| | | | | Attendance: 9,820 |

== Scottish Premier Division table ==
| Pos | Team | Pld | W | D | L | GF | GA | GD | Pts | Qualification or relegation |
|---|---|---|---|---|---|---|---|---|---|---|
| 1 | Celtic (C) | 44 | 31 | 10 | 3 | 79 | 23 | +56 | 72 | Qualification for the European Cup first round |
| 2 | Heart of Midlothian | 44 | 23 | 16 | 5 | 74 | 32 | +42 | 62 | Qualification for the UEFA Cup first round |
| 3 | Rangers | 44 | 26 | 8 | 10 | 85 | 34 | +51 | 60 | Qualification for the UEFA Cup first round |
| 4 | Aberdeen | 44 | 21 | 17 | 6 | 56 | 25 | +31 | 59 | Qualification for the UEFA Cup first round |
| 5 | Dundee United | 44 | 16 | 15 | 13 | 54 | 47 | +7 | 47 | Qualification for the Cup Winners' Cup first round |

Source: Statto
Rules for classification: 1) points; 2) goal difference; 3) number of goals scored.
(C) Champions

== Squad information ==
| No. | Pos | Nat | Player | Total | | Scottish Premier Division | | Scottish Cup | | Scottish League Cup | |
| No. | Pos | Nat | Player | Apps | Goals | Apps | Goals | Apps | Goals | Apps | Goals |
|---|---|---|---|---|---|---|---|---|---|---|---|
| | DF | (Scotland) SCO | Dave McPherson | 51 | 0 | 44 | 0 | 4 | 0 | 3 | 0 |
| | GK | (Scotland) SCO | Henry Smith | 51 | 0 | 44 | 0 | 4 | 0 | 3 | 0 |
| | FW | (Scotland) SCO | John Colquhoun | 51 | 0 | 44 | 0 | 4 | 0 | 3 | 0 |
| | DF | (Scotland) SCO | Brian Whittaker | 49 | 0 | 42 | 0 | 4 | 0 | 3 | 0 |
| | MF | (Scotland) SCO | Gary Mackay | 48 | 0 | 41 | 0 | 4 | 0 | 3 | 0 |
| | MF | (Scotland) SCO | Kenny Black | 48 | 0 | 42 | 0 | 4 | 0 | 2 | 0 |
| | FW | (Scotland) SCO | John Robertson | 46 | 0 | 39 | 0 | 4 | 0 | 3 | 0 |
| | FW | (England) ENG | Wayne Foster | 44 | 0 | 39 | 0 | 3 | 0 | 2 | 0 |
| | MF | (Scotland) SCO | Neil Berry | 42 | 0 | 35 | 0 | 4 | 0 | 3 | 0 |
| | MF | (Scotland) SCO | Sandy Clark | 40 | 0 | 35 | 0 | 2 | 0 | 3 | 0 |
| | MF | (Scotland) SCO | Mike Galloway | 28 | 0 | 25 | 0 | 3 | 0 | 0 | 0 |
| | DF | (Scotland) SCO | Hugh Burns | 27 | 0 | 24 | 0 | 2 | 0 | 1 | 0 |
| | MF | (Scotland) SCO | Iain Jardine | 25 | 0 | 18 | 0 | 4 | 0 | 3 | 0 |
| | DF | (Scotland) SCO | Walter Kidd | 22 | 0 | 18 | 0 | 1 | 0 | 3 | 0 |
| | DF | (Scotland) SCO | Craig Levein | 21 | 0 | 21 | 0 | 0 | 0 | 0 | 0 |
| | MF | (Scotland) SCO | Sandy Jardine | 12 | 0 | 9 | 0 | 0 | 0 | 3 | 0 |
| | DF | (Scotland) SCO | Malcolm Murray | 8 | 0 | 7 | 0 | 1 | 0 | 0 | 0 |
| | MF | (Scotland) SCO | Allan Moore | 8 | 0 | 7 | 0 | 1 | 0 | 0 | 0 |
| | FW | (Scotland) SCO | Mark Gavin | 7 | 0 | 7 | 0 | 0 | 0 | 0 | 0 |
| | FW | (Scotland) SCO | Scott Crabbe | 5 | 0 | 5 | 0 | 0 | 0 | 0 | 0 |
| | DF | (Scotland) SCO | Jimmy Sandison | 3 | 0 | 2 | 0 | 1 | 0 | 0 | 0 |
| | DF | (Scotland) SCO | Alan McLaren | 1 | 0 | 1 | 0 | 0 | 0 | 0 | 0 |

== See also ==
- List of Heart of Midlothian F.C. seasons
