= 1986–87 Heart of Midlothian F.C. season =

Heart of Midlothian
1986–87 season
- Chairman: Wallace Mercer
- Manager: Alex MacDonald; Sandy Jardine
- Stadium: Tynecastle Stadium
- Scottish Premier Division: 5th
- UEFA Cup: Round 1
- Scottish Cup: Semi-final
- League Cup: Round 2
- East of Scotland Shield: Runner-up
- Top goalscorer: League: John Robertson (16); All: John Robertson (19)
- Highest home attendance: 29,091 v Rangers Scottish Premier Division 7 February 1987
- Lowest home attendance: 6,779 v Dundee United Scottish Premier Division 11 May 1987
- Average home league attendance: 14,531

The 1986–87 season was Heart of Midlothian F.C.'s 4th consecutive season of play in the Scottish Premier Division. Hearts also competed in the UEFA Cup, Scottish Cup, Scottish League Cup and the East of Scotland Shield.

== Fixtures ==
=== Friendlies ===
28 July 1986 Friendly	Stoke City	1–0	Hearts
	Graham Shaw 39'			Attendance: 600

30 July 1986 Friendly	Wigan Athletic	1–1	Hearts
	Lowe 40'		John Colquhoun	Attendance: 375

31 July 1986 Friendly	Bohemian	0–3	Hearts
			John Colquhoun 50'; Andy Watson; Willie Irvine	Attendance: 300

2 August 1986 Friendly	Stenhousemuir	0–2	Hearts
			Goal

5 August 1986 Friendly	Hearts	2–1	Watford
	John Colquhoun 3'; Sandy Clark 12'		Luther Blisset 47'	Attendance: 8,500

2 September 1986 Friendly	Hearts	2–2	Manchester United
	Iain Jardine 6'; Andy Watson 69'		Olsen 72' (pen.); Gibson 74'	Attendance: 11,741

24 May 1987 Friendly	San Diego Nomads	4–4	Hearts
	Goal		Wayne Foster; Sandy Clark; Kenny Black 12'	Attendance: 375

26 May 1987 Friendly	San Jose Earthquakes	1–4	Hearts
	Goal		Andy Watson; John Colquhoun; John Robertson

29 May 1987 Friendly	California Kickers	1–2	Hearts
	Goal		Neil Berry; John Colquhoun

31 May 1987 Friendly	Seattle Storm	1–1	Hearts
	Goal		Allan Moore

=== Uefa Cup ===
17 September 1986 UEFA Cup R1	Hearts	3–2	Dukla Prague	Tynecastle Stadium
	Wayne Foster 1'; Sandy Clark 65'; John Robertson 78'		Dusan Fitzel 44'; Josef Klucky 65'	Attendance: 18,869

1 October 1986 UEFA Cup R1	Dukla Prague	1–0	Hearts	Stadion Juliska
	Stanislav Griga 53'			Attendance: 3,500

=== League Cup ===
19 August 1986 League Cup R2	Hearts	0–2	Montrose	Tynecastle Stadium
			Alan Lyons 40'; Mark Bennett 57'	Attendance: 7,028

=== Scottish Cup ===
31 January 1987 Scottish Cup R3	Hearts	0–0	Kilmarnock	Tynecastle Stadium
				Attendance: 15,227

4 February 1987 Scottish Cup R3 Replay	Kilmarnock	1–1	Hearts	Rugby Park
	Ian Bryson 44' (pen.)		Wayne Foster 66'	Attendance: 14,932

9 February 1987 Scottish Cup R3 2nd Replay	Kilmarnock	1–3	Hearts	Rugby Park
	Paul Martin 74'		Gary Mackay 24'; Kenny Black 46'; Wayne Foster 89'	Attendance: 14,146

21 February 1987 Scottish Cup R4	Hearts	1–0	Celtic	Tynecastle Stadium
	John Robertson 80'			Attendance: 28,891

14 March 1987 Scottish Cup QF	Hearts	1–1	Motherwell	Tynecastle Stadium
	John Robertson 43'		Andy Walker	Attendance: 22,045

17 March 1987 Scottish Cup QF Replay	Motherwell	0–1	Hearts	Fir Park
			John Colquhoun 85'	Attendance: 15,275

11 April 1987 Scottish Cup SF	St Mirren	2– 1	Hearts	Hampden Park
	Ian Ferguson 33'; Frank McGarvey 83'		Gary Mackay 74'	Attendance: 29,290

=== East of Scotland Shield ===
6 May 1987 East of Scotland Shield	Hearts	0–2	Hibs	Tynecastle Stadium
			Goal	Attendance: 958

=== Scottish Premier Division ===
9 August 1986 Scottish Premier Division	St Mirren	0–0	Hearts	Love Street
				Attendance: 8,788

13 August 1986 Scottish Premier Division	Hearts	1–0	Hamilton Academical	Tynecastle Stadium
	John Robertson 42'			Attendance: 10,103

16 August 1986 Scottish Premier Division	Hearts	1–0	Falkirk	Tynecastle Stadium
	Andy Watson 84'			Attendance: 11,198

23 August 1986 Scottish Premier Division	Dundee United	1–0	Hearts	Tannadice
	Paul Hegarty 34'			Attendance: 11,201

30 August 1986 Scottish Premier Division	Hibernian	1–3	Hearts	Easter Road
	Joseph McBride 83'		Sandy Clark 26'; Iain Jardine 40'; John Robertson 64'	Attendance: 20,714

6 September 1986 Scottish Premier Division	Hearts	2–1	Clydebank	Tynecastle Stadium
	Wayne Foster 67'; Gary Mackay 81'		Stuart Gordon 9'	Attendance: 10,158

13 September 1986 Scottish Premier Division	Aberdeen	0–1	Hearts	Pittodrie Stadium
			Sandy Clark 34'	Attendance: 15,625

20 September 1986 Scottish Premier Division	Hearts	4–0	Motherwell	Tynecastle Stadium
	John Colquhoun 19'; Andy Watson 68'; Sandy Clark 73'; John Robertson 88'			Attendance: 11,113

27 September 1986 Scottish Premier Division	Dundee	0–0	Hearts	Dens Park
				Attendance: 9,947

4 October 1986 Scottish Premier Division	Hearts	1–1	Rangers	Tynecastle Stadium
	Neil Berry 17'		Davie Cooper 49'	Attendance: 28,637

8 October 1986 Scottish Premier Division	Celtic	2–0	Hearts	Celtic Park
	Maurice Johnston 64'; Brian McClair 89' (pen.)			Attendance: 32,382

11 October 1986 Scottish Premier Division	Hearts	0–0	St Mirren	Tynecastle Stadium
				Attendance: 11,420

18 October 1986 Scottish Premier Division	Hamilton Academical	1–3	Hearts	Douglas Park
	Gerard McCabe 59'		John Colquhoun 71'; Wayne Foster 82'; Gary Mackay 85' (pen.)	Attendance: 5,405

25 October 1986 Scottish Premier Division	Hearts	2–2	Dundee United	Tynecastle Stadium
	John Colquhoun 20'; Gary Mackay 64' (pen.)		Paul Sturrock 45' 90'	Attendance: 14,320

29 October 1986 Scottish Premier Division	Falkirk	2–0	Hearts	Brockville Park
	Jimmy Gilmour 34'; Alan Irvine 75'			Attendance: 8,229

1 November 1986 Scottish Premier Division	Hearts	1–1	Hibs	Tynecastle Stadium
	Gary Mackay 68' (pen.)		Joseph McBride 18'	Attendance: 22,178

8 November 1986 Scottish Premier Division	Clydebank	0–3	Hearts	Kilbowie Park
			John Colquhoun 62' 70'; Roddy Macdonald 67'	Attendance: 3,714

15 November 1986 Scottish Premier Division	Hearts	2–1	Aberdeen	Tynecastle Stadium
	John Colquhoun 62'; John Robertson 82'		John Hewitt 16'	Attendance: 17,108

19 November 1986 Scottish Premier Division	Motherwell	2–3	Hearts	Fir Park
	Roddie Macdonald 51' 54'; Neil Berry		Andy Walker 53'; Ray Farningham	Attendance: 6,341

22 November 1986 Scottish Premier Division	Hearts	3–1	Dundee	Tynecastle Stadium
	John Colquhoun 27'; John Robertson 53'; Kenny Black		Ian Angus 23'	Attendance: 12,094

29 November 1986 Scottish Premier Division	Rangers	3–0	Hearts	Ibrox Stadium
	Ally McCoist 17'; Davie Cooper 36'; Ian Durrant 84'			Attendance: 38,633

3 December 1986 Scottish Premier Division	Hearts	1–0	Celtic	Tynecastle Stadium
	Neil Berry 34'			Attendance: 25,886

6 December 1986 Scottish Premier Division	St Mirren	0–0	Hearts	Love Street
				Attendance: 6,177

13 December 1986 Scottish Premier Division	Hearts	7–0	Hamilton Academical	Tynecastle Stadium
	Sandy Clark 10'; Gary Mackay 17' (pen.); Roddie MacDonald 23'; John Colquhoun 32'; Sandy Jardine 39'; John Robertson 57' 86'			Attendance: 9,324

20 December 1986 Scottish Premier Division	Dundee United	3–1	Hearts	Tannadice
	Paul Sturrock 81'; Eamonn Bannon 86'; Iain Ferguson 90'		John Robertson 30'	Attendance: 11,749

27 December 1986 Scottish Premier Division	Hearts	4–0	Falkirk	Tynecastle Stadium
	Sandy Clark 25'; John Robertson 27' 48'; Roderick Manley 58' (og.)			Attendance: 13,214

3 January 1987 Scottish Premier Division	Hearts	3–0	Clydebank	Tynecastle Stadium
	John Robertson 9'; Sandy Clark 49'; Gary Mackay 62'			Attendance: 12,022

6 January 1987 Scottish Premier Division	Hibs	2–2	Hearts	Easter Road
	George McCluskey 10'; Weir 32'		John Colquhoun 11' 16'	Attendance: 22,928; Referee: J Duncan

21 January 1987 Scottish Premier Division	Aberdeen	2–1	Hearts	Pittodrie Stadium
	Brian Grant 25'; Willie Miller 53'		Andy Watson 67'	Attendance: 15,746

24 January 1987 Scottish Premier Division	Dundee	0–1	Hearts	Dens Park
			Gary Mackay 49'	Attendance: 8,387

7 February 1987 Scottish Premier Division	Hearts	2–5	Rangers	Tynecastle Stadium
	John Robertson 35' (pen.) 87' (pen.)		Robert Fleck 31' 59'; Graham Roberts 37'; Black 66' (og.); Ally McCoist 76'	Attendance: 29,091

14 February 1987 Scottish Premier Division	Celtic	1–1	Hearts	Celtic Park
	Brian McClair 17'		Wayne Foster 78'	Attendance: 36,214

25 February 1987 Scottish Premier Division	Hearts	1–1	Motherwell	Tynecastle Stadium
	John Robertson 86'		Steve Kirk 14'	Attendance: 9,639

28 February 1987 Scottish Premier Division	Hearts	1–0	St Mirren	Tynecastle Stadium
	John Colquhoun 46'			Attendance: 12,002

7 March 1987 Scottish Premier Division	Hamilton Academical	0–1	Hearts	Douglas Park
			John Colquhoun 66'	Attendance: 4,778

21 March 1987 Scottish Premier Division	Falkirk	0–0	Hearts	Brockville Park
				Attendance: 6,681

28 March 1987 Scottish Premier Division	Clydebank	1–1	Hearts	Kilbowie Park
	Mike Conroy 3'		John Colquhoun 40'	Attendance: 3,194

4 April 1987 Scottish Premier Division	Hearts	2–1	Hibs	Tynecastle Stadium
	Roddie MacDonald 71'; Sandy Clark 78'		MacDonald (og.)	Attendance: 19,731

15 April 1987 Scottish Premier Division	Motherwell	0–1	Hearts	Fir Park
			Sandy Clark 11'	Attendance: 3,907

18 April 1987 Scottish Premier Division	Hearts	1–1	Aberdeen	Tynecastle Stadium
	Wayne Foster		John Hewitt	Attendance: 12,539

25 April 1987 Scottish Premier Division	Rangers	3–0	Hearts	Ibrox Stadium
			Alistair McCoist 10' 48' 62' (pen.)	Attendance: 42,837

2 May 1987 Scottish Premier Division	Hearts	1–3	Dundee	Tynecastle Stadium
	George Cowie 65'		Keith Wright 17' 50'; Stuart Rafferty 80'	Attendance: 7,818

9 May 1987 Scottish Premier Division	Hearts	1–0	Celtic	Tynecastle Stadium
	John Robertson (pen.)			Attendance: 12,596

11 May 1987 Scottish Premier Division	Hearts	1–1	Dundee United	Tynecastle Stadium
	John Robertson 6' (pen.)		Billy Kirkwood 6' (pen.)	Attendance: 6,779

== Scottish Premier Division table ==
Pos	Team	Pld	W	D	L	GF	GA	GD	Pts	Qualification or relegation
3	Dundee United	44	24	12	8	66	36	+30	60	Qualification for the UEFA Cup first round
4	Aberdeen	44	21	16	7	63	29	+34	58	Qualification for the UEFA Cup first round
5	Heart of Midlothian	44	21	14	9	64	43	+21	56	
6	Dundee	44	18	12	14	74	57	+17	48	
7	St Mirren	44	12	12	20	36	51	−15	36	Qualification for the Cup Winners' Cup first round

Source: Statto
Rules for classification: 1) points; 2) goal difference; 3) number of goals scored.

== Squad information ==
No.	Pos	Nat	Player	Total		Scottish Premier Division		Scottish Cup		Scottish League Cup		Uefa Cup	
No.	Pos	Nat	Player	Apps	Goals	Apps	Goals	Apps	Goals	Apps	Goals	Apps	Goals
	GK	(Scotland) SCO	Henry Smith	53	0	43	0	7	0	1	0	2	0
	GK	(Scotland) SCO	Andy Bruce	1	0	1	0	0	0	0	0	0	0
	DF	(Scotland) SCO	Malcolm Murray	9	0	8	0	1	0	0	0	0	0
	DF	(Scotland) SCO	Brian Whittaker	44	0	37	0	5	0	0	0	2	0
	DF	(Scotland) SCO	Walter Kidd	42	0	35	0	4	0	1	0	2	0
	DF	(Scotland) SCO	Craig Levein	15	0	12	0	0	0	1	0	2	0
	DF	(Scotland) SCO	George Cowie	14	1	10	1	4	0	0	0	0	0
	DF	(Scotland) SCO	Jimmy Sandison	17	0	13	0	4	0	0	0	0	0
	MF	(Scotland) SCO	Kenny Black	52	2	42	1	7	1	1	0	2	0
	MF	(Scotland) SCO	Sandy Clark	51	9	41	8	7	0	1	0	2	1
	MF	(Scotland) SCO	Gary Mackay	46	9	36	7	7	2	1	0	2	0
	MF	(Scotland) SCO	Sandy Jardine	40	1	34	1	3	0	1	0	2	0
	MF	(Scotland) SCO	Neil Berry	37	3	30	3	5	0	1	0	1	0
	MF	(Scotland) SCO	Andy Watson	37	3	28	3	6	0	1	0	2	0
	MF	(Scotland) SCO	Roddie MacDonald	34	5	27	5	7	0	0	0	0	0
	MF	(Scotland) SCO	Iain Jardine	17	1	15	1	0	0	1	0	1	0
	MF	(Scotland) SCO	Allan Moore	10	0	10	0	0	0	0	0	0	0
	MF	(Scotland) SCO	Billy MacKay	3	0	2	0	0	0	1	0	0	0
	FW	(Scotland) SCO	John Robertson	46	19	37	16	6	2	1	0	2	1
	FW	(Scotland) SCO	Scott Crabbe	6	0	5	0	1	0	0	0	0	0
	FW	(Scotland) SCO	John Colquhoun	53	14	43	13	7	1	1	0	2	0
	FW	(England) ENG	Wayne Foster	40	7	31	4	7	2	0	0	2	1

== See also ==
- List of Heart of Midlothian F.C. seasons
