= 1988–89 Heart of Midlothian F.C. season =

Heart of Midlothian
1988–89 season
- Chairman: Wallace Mercer
- Manager: Alex MacDonald
- Stadium: Tynecastle Stadium
- Scottish Premier Division: 6th
- Uefa Cup: Quarter-final
- Scottish Cup: Quarter-final
- League Cup: Semi-final
- Top goalscorer: League: Iain Ferguson (5); John Colquhoun (5); All: Iain Ferguson (11)
- Highest home attendance: 26,424 v Rangers Scottish Premier Division 10 December 1988
- Lowest home attendance: 8,392 v Dundee Scottish Premier Division 28 September 1988
- Average home league attendance: 15,367

The 1988–89 season was Heart of Midlothian F.C.'s sixth consecutive season in the Scottish Premier Division. Hearts also competed in the UEFA Cup, Scottish Cup and Scottish League Cup.

== Fixtures ==
=== Friendlies ===
13 July 1988 Friendly	TSV Battenberg	3–3	Hearts
			Mike Galloway 35'; Mackay 68' (pen.); Crabbe 80'	Attendance: 800

15 July 1988 Friendly	Rot-Weiss Essen	1–1	Hearts
	Megmann		Mike Galloway 60'	Attendance: 2,500

16 July 1988 Friendly	Fortuna Düsseldorf	1–0	Hearts
	Sven Demandt			Attendance: 1,500

20 July 1988 Friendly	Remscheid	0–2	Hearts
			Jardine 35'; Clark	Attendance: 200

23 July 1988 Friendly	ASC Schoeppingen	2–2	Hearts
	Goal		Black 35'; Gavin 86'	Attendance: 500

24 July 1988 Friendly	TUS Zuelpich	2–4	Hearts
	Goal		Clark; Mike Galloway; John Colquhoun 86'	Attendance: 600

30 July 1988 Friendly	Forres Mechanics	1–5	Hearts
	Dunbar 26'		Ferguson 5'; Mike Galloway 17' 31'; Gary Mackay 45'; Wayne Foster 75'	Attendance: 150

1 August 1988 Friendly	Lossiemouth	0–4	Hearts
			Sandy Clark 35'; John Colquhoun 81'; Ferguson 85'	Attendance: 900

6 August 1988 Friendly	Airdrieonians	0–5	Hearts
			Mike Galloway 16'; John Colquhoun 17'; Sandy Clark 31'; Iain Jardine 85'; Ferguson 87'	Attendance: 3,500

9 August 1988 Friendly	Hearts	2–1	Cruzeiro
	Kenny Black 43' (pen.); Ferguson 88'		Eder 2'	Attendance: 12,403

12 September 1988 Friendly	Hearts	0–3	Nottingham Forest
			Nigel Clough 24'; Mike Galloway 27' (og.); Garry Parker 64'	Attendance: 8,876

18 December 1988 Friendly	Dunfermline Athletic	3–5	Hearts
	Trevor Smith 8'; James Jack 31'; Willie Callaghan 48'		Iain Ferguson 23' 30'; Mike Galloway 75' 88'; Wayne Foster 84'	Attendance: 3,400

=== Uefa Cup ===
7 September 1988 Uefa Cup R1	St Patricks Athletic	0–2	Hearts	Richmond Park
				Attendance: 9,000

5 October 1988 Uefa Cup R1	Hearts	2–0	St Patricks Athletic	Tynecastle Stadium
				Attendance: 11,142

26 October 1988 Uefa Cup R2	Hearts	0–0	Austria Vienna	Tynecastle Stadium
				Attendance: 14,021

9 November 1988 Uefa Cup R2	Austria Vienna	0–1	Hearts	Franz Horr Stadium
				Attendance: 15,000

23 November 1988 Uefa Cup R3	Hearts	3–0	Velež Mostar	Tynecastle Stadium
				Attendance: 17,417

7 December 1988 Uefa Cup R3	Velež Mostar	2–1	Hearts	Stadion pod Bijelim Brijegom
				Attendance: 17,000

28 February 1989 Uefa Cup QF	Hearts	1–0	Bayern Munich	Tynecastle Stadium
				Attendance: 26,294

14 March 1989 Uefa Cup QF	Bayern Munich	2–0	Hearts	Olympic Stadium
				Attendance: 25,000

=== League Cup ===
17 August 1988 League Cup R2	Hearts	5–0	St Johnstone	Tynecastle Stadium
	Iain Ferguson 10' 19' (pen.) 42'; Mackay; Iain Jardine 80'			Attendance: 10,474

23 August 1988 League Cup R3	Meadowbank Thistle	0–2	Hearts	Brockville Park
			Kenny Black; Malcolm Murray 88'	Attendance: 6,685

31 August 1988 League Cup QF	Dunfermline Athletic	1–4	Hearts	East End Park
	John Watson 30'		Mackay 3'; John Colquhoun; Iain Ferguson 80'	Attendance: 15,494

21 September 1988 League Cup SF	Rangers	3–0	Hearts	Hampden Park
	Mark Walters 11' 72'; Scott Nisbet 52'			Attendance: 53,107

=== Scottish Cup ===
28 January 1989 Scottish Cup R3	Hearts	4–1	Ayr United	Tynecastle Stadium
	Stephen McIntyre 4'; Mike Galloway 8'; John Colquhoun 63'; Dave McPherson 80'			Attendance: 15, 916

18 February 1989 Scottish Cup R4	Hearts	2–0	Partick Thistle	Tynecastle Stadium
	Eamonn Bannon 67'; John Colquhoun 78'			Attendance: 18,350

18 March 1989 Scottish Cup QF	Celtic	2– 1	Hearts	Celtic Park
	Mark McGhee 17'; Robert Aitken 35' (pen.)		Eamonn Bannon 73'	Attendance: 46,348

=== Scottish Premier Division ===
13 August 1988 Scottish Premier Division	Celtic	1–0	Hearts	Celtic Park
	Frank McAvennie 51'			Attendance: 44,881

20 August 1988 Scottish Premier Division	Hearts	3–2	Hamilton	Tynecastle Stadium
	Iain Ferguson 12'; Sandy Clark 51'; John Colquhoun 60'		James Fairlie; John McNaught 81'	Attendance: 12,032

27 August 1988 Scottish Premier Division	Hibernian	0–0	Hearts	Easter Road
				Attendance: 23,760

3 September 1988 Scottish Premier Division	Hearts	1–2	St Mirren	Tynecastle Stadium
	Wayne Foster 57' (pen.)		Paul Chalmers 12'; Brian Hamilton 42'	Attendance: 11,389

17 September 1988 Scottish Premier Division	Hearts	1–2	Rangers	Tynecastle Stadium
	Terry Butcher 74' (og.)		Iain Durrant 47' (pen.); Scott Nisbet 64'	Attendance: 25,401

24 September 1988 Scottish Premier Division	Aberdeen	1–0	Hearts	Pittodrie Stadium
	Charlie Nicholas 11'			Attendance: 15,160

28 September 1988 Scottish Premier Division	Hearts	1–1	Dundee	Tynecastle Stadium
	Iain Ferguson 82'		Robert Shannon 63'	Attendance: 8,392

1 October 1988 Scottish Premier Division	Dundee United	0–0	Hearts	Tannadice Park
				Attendance: 10,838

8 October 1988 Scottish Premier Division	Hearts	2–2	Motherwell	Tynecastle Stadium
	Allan Moore 39' 47'		Ray Farningham 60'; Craig Paterson 70'	Attendance: 8,809

11 October 1988 Scottish Premier Division	Hamilton	0–4	Hearts	Douglas Park
			Iain Ferguson; Kenny Black; John Colquhoun	Attendance: 4,764

22 October 1988 Scottish Premier Division	Hearts	0–2	Celtic	Tynecastle Stadium
			Mark McGhee; Frank McAvennie	Attendance: 24,017

29 October 1988 Scottish Premier Division	Hearts	1–1	Aberdeen	Tynecastle Stadium
	Iain Jardine		Brian Whittaker (Og.)	Attendance: 12,644

1 November 1988 Scottish Premier Division	Rangers	3–0	Hearts	Ibrox Stadium
	Richard Gough; Mark Walters (pen.); Andrew Gray			Attendance: 36,505

5 November 1988 Scottish Premier Division	St Mirren	1–1	Hearts	Love Street Stadium
	Mark McWalter 63'		Peter Godfrey 91' (og.)	Attendance: 7,563

12 November 1988 Scottish Premier Division	Hearts	1–2	Hibernian	Tynecastle Stadium
	Dave McPherson 90'		Paul Kane 15'; Steve Archibald 83'	Attendance: 23,062

19 November 1988 Scottish Premier Division	Hearts	0–0	Dundee United	Tynecastle Stadium
				Attendance: 10,121

26 November 1988 Scottish Premier Division	Motherwell	2–0	Hearts	Fir Park
	Steve Kirk 10'; Steve Cowan 83'			Attendance: 6,208

3 December 1988 Scottish Premier Division	Dundee	1–1	Hearts	Dens Park
	Graham Harvey 75'		John Colquhoun 51'	Attendance: 6,909

10 December 1988 Scottish Premier Division	Hearts	2–0	Rangers	Tynecastle Stadium
	Mike Galloway; Iain Ferguson			Attendance: 26,424

17 December 1988 Scottish Premier Division	Hearts	2–0	Hamilton	Tynecastle Stadium
	Alan McLaren; Dave McPherson			Attendance: 11,490

31 December 1988 Scottish Premier Division	Celtic	4–2	Hearts	Celtic Park
	Billy Stark; Mark McGhee		John Robertson	Attendance: 41,555

4 January 1989 Scottish Premier Division	Hibs	1–0	Hearts	Easter Road
	Edward May 13'			Attendance: 27,219

7 January 1989 Scottish Premier Division	Hearts	2–0	St Mirren	Tynecastle Stadium
	John Colquhoun 3'; Tosh McKinlay 62'			Attendance: 11,961

14 January 1989 Scottish Premier Division	Hearts	0–0	Motherwell	Tynecastle Stadium
				Attendance: 13,283

21 January 1989 Scottish Premier Division	Dundee United	0–0	Hearts	Tannadice Park
				Attendance: 13,674

11 February 1989 Scottish Premier Division	Hearts	3–1	Dundee	Tynecastle Stadium
	John Colquhoun 31'; Eamonn Bannon 41'; Gary Mackay 58'		Alan Lawrence 5'	Attendance: 10,432

25 February 1989 Scottish Premier Division	Aberdeen	3–0	Hearts	Pittodrie
	Brian Irvine 24'; Dave McPherson 30' (og.); Paul Wright 37'			Attendance: 14,887; Referee: Jim McCluskey

11 March 1989 Scottish Premier Division	Hearts	0–1	Celtic	Tynecastle Stadium
			Mark McGhee 54'	Attendance: 23,087

25 March 1989 Scottish Premier Division	Hamilton	0–2	Hearts	Douglas Park
			Gary Mackay 40'; Dave McPherson 75'	Attendance: 3,854

1 April 1989 Scottish Premier Division	Hearts	2–1	Hibs	Tynecastle Stadium
	Eamonn Bannon 29'; John Robertson 81'		Keith Houchen 25'	Attendance: 22,090

8 April 1989 Scottish Premier Division	St Mirren	1–1	Hearts	Love Street Stadium
	Peter Weir 31'		John Robertson 77'	Attendance: 6,970

15 April 1989 Scottish Premier Division	Dundee	2–1	Hearts	Dens Park
	Gordon Chisholm 72'; Keith Wright 87'		Dave McPherson 18'	Attendance: 6,993

22 April 1989 Scottish Premier Division	Hearts	1–0	Aberdeen	Tynecastle Stadium
	Mike Galloway 14'			Attendance: 13,367

29 April 1989 Scottish Premier Division	Rangers	4–0	Hearts	Ibrox Stadium
	Mel Sterland 17' 40'; Kevin Drinkell 57' 70'			Attendance: 42,122

6 May 1989 Scottish Premier Division	Hearts	0–0	Dundee United	Tynecastle Stadium
				Attendance: 8,613

13 May 1989 Scottish Premier Division	Motherwell	1–1	Hearts	Fir Park
	Colin O'Neill 49' (pen.)		Neil Berry 78'	Attendance: 4,587

== Scottish Premier Division table ==
Pos	Team	Pld	W	D	L	GF	GA	GD	Pts	Qualification or relegation
4	Dundee United	36	16	12	8	44	26	+18	44	Qualification for the UEFA Cup first round
5	Hibernian	36	13	9	14	37	36	+1	35	Qualification for the UEFA Cup first round
6	Heart of Midlothian	36	9	13	14	35	42	−7	31	
7	St Mirren	36	11	7	18	39	55	−16	29	
8	Dundee	36	9	10	17	34	48	−14	28	

Source: Statto
Rules for classification: 1) points; 2) goal difference; 3) number of goals scored.

== Squad information ==
No.	Pos	Nat	Player	Total		Scottish Premier Division		Scottish Cup		Scottish League Cup		Uefa Cup	
No.	Pos	Nat	Player	Apps	Goals	Apps	Goals	Apps	Goals	Apps	Goals	Apps	Goals
	GK	(Scotland) SCO	Henry Smith	51	0	36	0	3	0	4	0	8	0
	GK	(Scotland) SCO	Murray McDermott	1	0	0	0	0	0	0	0	1	0
	DF	(Scotland) SCO	Dave McPherson	47	5	32	4	3	1	4	0	8	0
	DF	(Scotland) SCO	Brian Whittaker	34	0	24	0	0	0	4	0	6	0
	DF	(Scotland) SCO	Walter Kidd	29	0	20	0	2	0	1	0	6	0
	DF	(Scotland) SCO	Craig Levein	13	0	9	0	2	0	0	0	2	0
	DF	(Scotland) SCO	Malcolm Murray	11	1	8	0	0	0	3	1	0	0
	DF	(Scotland) SCO	Tosh McKinlay	22	1	17	1	3	0	0	0	2	0
	DF	(Scotland) SCO	Alan McLaren	17	1	12	1	3	0	0	0	2	0
	DF	(Scotland) SCO	Jimmy Sandison	17	0	14	0	1	0	0	0	2	0
	MF	(Scotland) SCO	Iain Jardine	20	2	15	1	0	0	2	1	3	0
	MF	(Scotland) SCO	Allan Moore	14	2	12	2	0	0	0	0	2	0
	MF	(Scotland) SCO	Neil Berry	47	1	32	1	3	0	4	0	8	0
	MF	(Scotland) SCO	Sandy Clark	4	1	2	1	0	0	2	0	0	0
	MF	(Scotland) SCO	Mike Galloway	46	8	31	2	3	1	4	0	8	5
	MF	(Scotland) SCO	Kenny Black	45	3	33	1	1	0	3	1	8	1
	MF	(Scotland) SCO	Eamonn Bannon	45	5	30	2	3	2	4	0	8	1
	MF	(Scotland) SCO	Gary Mackay	44	4	29	2	3	0	4	2	8	0
	FW	(Scotland) SCO	Mark Gavin	2	0	2	0	0	0	0	0	0	0
	FW	(Scotland) SCO	Scott Crabbe	1	0	1	0	0	0	0	0	0	0
	FW	(England) ENG	Wayne Foster	17	2	9	1	0	0	3	0	5	1
	FW	(Scotland) SCO	John Colquhoun	51	9	36	5	3	2	4	1	8	1
	FW	(Scotland) SCO	Iain Ferguson	41	11	29	5	2	0	4	5	6	1
	FW	(Scotland) SCO	John Robertson	19	4	15	4	3	0	0	0	1	0

== See also ==
- List of Heart of Midlothian F.C. seasons
