= 1990–91 Heart of Midlothian F.C. season =

Heart of Midlothian
1990–91 season
- Chairman: Wallace Mercer
- Manager: Alex MacDonald (to 9 September); Joe Jordan (from 10 September)
- Stadium: Tynecastle Stadium
- Scottish Premier Division: 5th
- UEFA Cup: Second round
- Scottish Cup: Third round
- League Cup: Quarter-final
- Top goalscorer: League: John Robertson (12); All: John Robertson (16)
- Highest home attendance: 22,001 v Rangers Scottish Premier Division 8 September 1990
- Lowest home attendance: 7,055 v Motherwell Scottish Premier Division 11 May 1991
- Average home league attendance: 13,232

The 1990–91 season was Heart of Midlothian F.C.'s 8th consecutive season of play in the Scottish Premier Division. Hearts also competed in the Scottish Cup & the Scottish League Cup.

== Managers ==
Hearts had two managers over the course of the season. They started under the stewardship of Alex MacDonald however he was sacked in September 1990 and replaced by Joe Jordan.

== Fixtures ==
=== Friendlies ===
30 July 1990 Friendly	Raith Rovers	2–3	Hearts
	Goal		Robertson McPherson	Attendance: 2,500

2 August 1990 Friendly	Liege	1–1	Hearts
	Goal		Kirkwood	Attendance: 9,500

3 August 1990 Friendly	Brighton and Hove Albion	2–2	Hearts
	Goal		Robertson	Attendance: 9,700

7 August 1990 Friendly	Valencia	3–1	Hearts
	Goal		Colquhoun	Attendance: 14,900

8 August 1990 Friendly	Levante	0–0	Hearts
				Attendance: 8,000

13 August 1990 Friendly	Hearts	1–1	Tottenham
	Foster		Howells 71'	Attendance: 18,068

17 August 1990 Friendly	Hearts	2–1	Airdrieonians
	Foster 71' (85)		Harvey 88'	Attendance: 3,124

15 March 1991 Friendly	Hearts	2–1	Gothenburg
	Colquhoun 35' Robertson 60'		Rehn 49'	Attendance: 4,530; Referee: W Crombie

=== Uefa Cup ===
19 September 1990 UEFA Cup R1	Dnipro Dnipropetrovsk	1–1	Hearts	Meteor Stadium
	Hudymenko 54'		Robertson 22'	Attendance: 15,500; Referee: Werner Foeckler

3 October 1990 UEFA Cup R1	Hearts	4–2	Dnipro Dnipropetrovsk	Tynecastle Stadium
	McPherson 19' Robertson 22' (pen.), 42'		Shakhov 41' (pen.)	Attendance: 18,760; Referee: Einar Halle

24 October 1990 UEFA Cup R2	Hearts	3–1	Bologna	Tynecastle Stadium
	Foster 6', 23' Ferguson 39'		Notaristefano 61'	Attendance: 11,155; Referee: Jose-Maria Enriquez Negreira

7 November 1990 UEFA Cup R2	Bologna	3–0	Hearts	Stadio Renato Dall'Ara
	Detari 19' Villa 73' Mariani 84'			Attendance: 12,224; Referee: Ignace Van Swieten

=== League Cup ===
22 August 1990 League Cup R2	Cowdenbeath	0–2	Hearts	Central Park
			Robertson 18' Bannon 68'	Attendance: 5,133; Referee: DFT Syme

22 August 1990 League Cup R3	St Mirren	0–1 (a.e.t.)	Hearts	Love Street
			Crabbe 113'	Attendance: 6,917; Referee: Donald McVicar

5 September 1990 League Cup QF	Aberdeen	3–0	Hearts	Pittodrie
			Van de Ven 7' Mason Bett 78' (pen.)	Attendance: 14,853; Referee: GB Smith

=== Scottish Cup ===
26 January 1991 Scottish Cup R3	Airdrieonians	2–1	Hearts	Broomfield Park
	Jack 48' Watson 59'		Mackay 11'	Attendance: 9,500

=== Scottish Premier Division ===
25 August 1990 Scottish Premier Division	Hearts	1–1	St Mirren	Tynecastle Stadium
	Robertson		Kinnaird	Attendance: 12,215

1 September 1990 Scottish Premier Division	Dunfermline Athletic	2–0	Hearts	East End Park
	Moyes McCall			Attendance: 10,602

8 September 1990 Scottish Premier Division	Hearts	0–2	Rangers	Tynecastle Stadium
	Wright 86'		Huistra McCoist	Attendance: 22,001

15 September 1990 Scottish Premier Division	Hibs	0–3	Hearts	Easter Road
			Robertson Levein	Attendance: 16,813

22 September 1990 Scottish Premier Division	Celtic	3–0	Hearts	Celtic Park
	Miller 4' (82) Creaney 80'			Attendance: 38,409; Referee: Bobby Tait

29 September 1990 Scottish Premier Division	Hearts	1–0	Dundee United	Tynecastle Stadium
	Bannon 72'			Attendance: 12,052

6 October 1990 Scottish Premier Division	Motherwell	1–1	Hearts	Fir Park
	Cusack		Ferguson	Attendance: 6,780

13 October 1990 Scottish Premier Division	Hearts	2–3	St Johnstone	Tynecastle Stadium
	Ferguson Kirkwood		Turner Curran Grant	Attendance: 12,886

20 October 1990 Scottish Premier Division	Aberdeen	3–0	Hearts	Pittodrie
	Bett Grant Gilhaus			Attendance: 14,853

27 October 1990 Scottish Premier Division	St Mirren	2–1	Hearts	Love Street
	Lambert 9' Torfason 70'		Colquhoun 47'	Attendance: 6,148

3 November 1990 Scottish Premier Division	Hearts	1–1	Dunfermline	Tynecastle Stadium
	Colquhoun		McCathie 69'	Attendance: 11,897

10 November 1990 Scottish Premier Division	Hearts	1–0	Celtic	Tynecastle Stadium
	Colquhoun 35'			Attendance: 19,189

17 November 1990 Scottish Premier Division	Dundee United	1–1	Hearts	Tannadice Park
	Levein 35'		Jackson	Attendance: 10,821; Referee: AW Waddell

24 November 1990 Scottish Premier Division	Hearts	1–1	Hibs	Tynecastle Stadium
	Berry 77'		Houchen 70'	Attendance: 19,004; Referee: KJ Hope

1 December 1990 Scottish Premier Division	Rangers	4–0	Hearts	Ibrox Stadium
	Johnston Hurlock McCoist 69' Walters 85' (pen.)			Attendance: 37,623

8 December 1990 Scottish Premier Division	Hearts	1–0	Aberdeen	Tynecastle Stadium
	Colquhoun 32'			Attendance: 9,839

15 December 1990 Scottish Premier Division	St Johnstone	2–1	Hearts	Ibrox Stadium
	Davies 40' Maskrey 62'		Crabbe 75'	Attendance: 7,826

22 December 1990 Scottish Premier Division	Hearts	3–2	Motherwell	Tynecastle Stadium
	McPherson Mackay Robertson		Arnott	Attendance: 8,635

29 December 1990 Scottish Premier Division	Celtic	1–1	Hearts	Celtic Park
	Coyne 4'		Colquhoun 80'	Attendance: 28,120

2 January 1991 Scottish Premier Division	Hibs	1–4	Hearts	Easter Road
	Mackay 68' (og.)		McKinlay 8' McPherson 14' Mackay 43' Levein 69'	Attendance: 13,600; Referee: J Duncan

5 January 1991 Scottish Premier Division	Hearts	0–1	Rangers	Tynecastle Stadium
			Hateley 61' (pen.)	Attendance: 20,956

12 January 1991 Scottish Premier Division	Hearts	2–0	St Mirren	Tynecastle Stadium
	Robertson 23' (Pen.), 75'			Attendance: 10,914

2 February 1991 Scottish Premier Division	Aberdeen	5–0	Hearts	Pittodrie
	Connor Booth Mason Booth			Attendance: 9,327

16 February 1991 Scottish Premier Division	Hearts	2–1	Dundee United	Tynecastle Stadium
	Robertson 68' Mclaren 89'		Clark	Attendance: 7,216

23 February 1991 Scottish Premier Division	Dunfermline Athletic	3–1	Hearts	East End Park
	Jack Leitch		Wilson og.'	Attendance: 7,273

2 March 1991 Scottish Premier Division	Motherwell	1–3	Hearts	Fir Park
	Griffin		Robertson Sandison Foster	Attendance: 5,212

6 March 1991 Scottish Premier Division	Hearts	2–1	St Johnstone	Tynecastle Stadium
	Colquhoun Ferguson		Moore	Attendance: 8,135

9 March 1991 Scottish Premier Division	Rangers	2–1	Hearts	Ibrox Stadium
	Steven Walters		Ferguson	Attendance: 36,128

23 March 1991 Scottish Premier Division	Hearts	3–1	Hibs	Tynecastle Stadium
	Levein 56' Wright 60' Robertson 65'		Tortolano 64'	Attendance: 14,221

30 March 1991 Scottish Premier Division	St Mirren	0–0	Hearts	Love Street
				Attendance: 4,840; Referee: Louis Thow

6 April 1991 Scottish Premier Division	Hearts	4–1	Dunfermline Athletic	Tynecastle Stadium
	Robertson 4' (86) Crabbe McKinlay		Smith 82'	Attendance: 8,102

13 April 1991 Scottish Premier Division	Hearts	1–4	Aberdeen	Tynecastle Stadium
	McKimmie og.'		Gilhaus McKimmie Connor	Attendance: 16,771

20 April 1991 Scottish Premier Division	St Johnstone	0–2	Hearts	McDiarmid Park
			Colquhoun Mackay	Attendance: 6,822

27 April 1991 Scottish Premier Division	Hearts	0–1	Celtic	Tynecastle Stadium
			Nicholas 36'	Attendance: 17,075; Referee: LW Mottram

4 May 1991 Scottish Premier Division	Dundee United	2–1	Hearts	Tannadice Park
	French 30' (81)		Crabbe	Attendance: 6,820

11 May 1991 Scottish Premier Division	Hearts	2–1	Motherwell	Tynecastle Stadium
	Robertson Bannon		Angus	Attendance: 7,055

== Scottish Premier Division table ==
Pos	Team	Pld	W	D	L	GF	GA	GD	Pts	Qualification or relegation
3	Celtic	36	17	7	12	52	38	+14	41	Qualification for the UEFA Cup first round
4	Dundee United	36	17	7	12	41	29	+12	41	
5	Heart of Midlothian	36	14	7	15	48	55	−7	35	
6	Motherwell	36	12	9	15	51	50	+1	33	Qualification for the Cup Winners' Cup first round
7	St Johnstone	36	11	9	16	41	54	−13	31	

Source: Statto.com
Rules for classification: 1) points; 2) goal difference; 3) number of goals scored.

== Stats ==
=== Squad information ===
No.	Pos	Nat	Player	Total		Scottish Premier Division		Scottish Cup		Scottish League Cup		Uefa Cup	
No.	Pos	Nat	Player	Apps	Goals	Apps	Goals	Apps	Goals	Apps	Goals	Apps	Goals
	GK	(Scotland) SCO	Henry Smith	31	0	23	0	1	0	3	0	4	0
	GK	(Scotland) SCO	Nicky Walker	13	0	13	0	0	0	0	0	0	0
	DF	(Scotland) SCO	Dave McPherson	41	3	34	2	1	0	3	0	3	1
	DF	(Scotland) SCO	Tosh McKinlay	41	2	33	2	1	0	3	0	4	0
	DF	(Scotland) SCO	Craig Levein	40	4	33	4	0	0	3	0	4	0
	DF	(Scotland) SCO	Alan McLaren	29	1	23	1	1	0	1	0	4	0
	DF	(Scotland) SCO	Jimmy Sandison	27	1	25	1	1	0	0	0	1	0
	DF	(Scotland) SCO	Walter Kidd	7	0	4	0	0	0	2	0	1	0
	MF	(Scotland) SCO	Gary Mackay	36	4	30	3	1	1	3	0	2	0
	MF	(Scotland) SCO	Neil Berry	25	1	19	1	1	0	2	0	3	0
	MF	(Scotland) SCO	Derek Ferguson	33	2	28	2	1	0	2	0	2	0
	MF	(Scotland) SCO	Eamonn Bannon	25	3	19	2	0	0	3	1	3	0
	MF	(Scotland) SCO	George Wright	19	2	17	2	0	0	0	0	2	0
	MF	(Scotland) SCO	Davie Kirkwood	13	1	9	1	0	0	0	0	4	0
	MF	(Northern Ireland) NIR	David McCreery	11	0	7	0	0	0	3	0	1	0
	MF	(Scotland) SCO	Tommy Harrison	3	0	3	0	0	0	0	0	0	0
	FW	(Scotland) SCO	John Colquhoun	43	7	36	7	1	0	2	0	4	0
	FW	(Scotland) SCO	John Robertson	38	16	31	12	1	0	3	1	3	3
	FW	(Scotland) SCO	Scott Crabbe	25	4	21	3	1	0	2	1	1	0
	FW	(Scotland) SCO	Iain Ferguson	15	3	12	2	0	0	0	0	3	1
	FW	(England) ENG	Wayne Foster	33	3	28	1	1	0	2	0	2	2

== Scorers ==
Pos	PLayer	SPL	SC	LC	EU	Total
FW	(Scotland) John Robertson	12	0	1	3	16
FW	(Scotland) John Colquhoun	7	0	0	0	7
DF	(Scotland) Craig Levein	4	0	0	0	4
MF	(Scotland) Gary Mackay	3	1	0	0	4
FW	(Scotland) Scott Crabbe	3	0	1	0	4
DF	(Scotland) Dave McPherson	2	0	0	1	3
MF	(Scotland) Eamonn Bannon	2	0	1	0	3
FW	(Scotland) Iain Ferguson	2	0	0	1	3
FW	(England) Wayne Foster	1	0	0	2	3
MF	(Scotland) Derek Ferguson	2	0	0	0	2
DF	(Scotland) Tosh McKinlay	2	0	0	0	2
MF	(Scotland) George Wright	2	0	0	0	2
MF	(Scotland) Davie Kirkwood	1	0	0	0	1
MF	(Scotland) Neil Berry	1	0	0	0	1
DF	(Scotland) Alan McLaren	1	0	0	0	1
DF	(Scotland) Jimmy Sandison	1	0	0	0	1

== See also ==
- List of Heart of Midlothian F.C. seasons
