= 1992–93 Heart of Midlothian F.C. season =

Heart of Midlothian
1992–93 season
- Chairman: Wallace Mercer
- Manager: Joe Jordan; Sandy Clark (Caretaker)
- Stadium: Tynecastle Stadium
- Scottish Premier Division: 5th
- UEFA Cup: Second round
- Scottish Cup: Semi-final
- League Cup: Quarter-final
- Top goalscorer: League: John Robertson (11); All: John Robertson (15)
- Highest home attendance: 21,502 v Celtic Scottish League Cup 26 August 1992
- Lowest home attendance: 5,060 v St Johnstone Scottish Premier Division 20 January 1993
- Average home league attendance: 9,829

The 1992–93 season was Heart of Midlothian F.C.'s 10th consecutive season of play in the Scottish Premier Division. Hearts also competed in the UEFA Cup, Scottish Cup & the Scottish League Cup.

== Managers ==
Hearts had two managers over the course of the season. Joe Jordan was sacked on 3 May after three years following a string of bad results including a 6–0 defeat by Falkirk. Sandy Clark took over as caretaker manager for the rest of the season.

== Fixtures ==
=== Friendlies ===
18 July 1992 Friendly	Raith Rovers	1–2	Hearts
	Goal		Crabbe Foster	Attendance: 1,519

22 July 1992 Friendly	Hamilton Academical	0–2	Hearts
			Mackay Ferguson	Attendance: 1,299

25 July 1992	Heart of Midlothian (Scotland)	1–2	(England) Tottenham Hotspur	Edinburgh, Scotland
	Levein		Durie (pen.)	Stadium: Tynecastle Stadium; Attendance: 7,018

=== Uefa Cup ===
16 September 1992 UEFA Cup R1	Slavia Prague	1–0	Hearts	Stadion Evžena Rošického
	Tatarchuk 85'			Attendance: 4,549; Referee: S Husajnov

30 September 1992 UEFA Cup R1	Hearts	4–2	Slavia Prague	Tynecastle Stadium
	Mackay 11' Baird 21' Levein 43' Snodin 79'		Silhavy 15' Kuka 65'	Attendance: 16,139; Referee: Rune Larsson

21 October 1992 UEFA Cup R2	Hearts	0–1	Standard Liège	Tynecastle Stadium
			Bettagno 7'	Attendance: 16,897; Referee: Gerhard Kapl

4 November 1992 UEFA Cup R2	Standard Liège	1–0	Hearts	Stade Maurice Dufrasne
	Wilmots 63'			Attendance: 17,000; Referee: Philippe Leduc

=== League Cup ===
12 August 1992 League Cup R2	Hearts	1–0	Clydebank	Tynecastle Stadium
	McLaren			Attendance: 5,758; Referee: Jim McCluskey

19 August 1992 League Cup R3	Brechin City	1–2	Hearts	Glebe Park
	Brown 83'		McKinlay 74' Robertson 108'	Attendance: 1,903; Referee: Kenny Clark

26 August 1992 League Cup QF	Hearts	1–2	Celtic	Tynecastle Stadium
	Mackay		Payton Creaney	Attendance: 21,502; Referee: DD Hope

=== Scottish Cup ===
9 January 1993 Scottish Cup R3	Hearts	6–0	Huntly	Tynecastle Stadium
	Baird Ferguson Snodin Robertson Boothroyd			Attendance: 9,520

6 February 1993 Scottish Cup R4	Hearts	2–0	Dundee	Tynecastle Stadium
	Ferguson Robertson			Attendance: 12,021

6 March 1993 Scottish Cup QF	Hearts	2–0	Falkirk	Tynecastle Stadium
	Preston 43' Robertson 48' (pen.)			Attendance: 12,721

3 April 1993 Scottish Cup SF	Hearts	1–2	Rangers	Celtic Park
	Preston 58'		McPherson McCoist 73'	Attendance: 41,700; Referee: DD Hope

=== Scottish Premier Division ===
1 August 1992 Scottish Premier Division	Hearts	0–1	Celtic	Tynecastle Stadium
			Levein (og.)	Attendance: 18,510

5 August 1992 Scottish Premier Division	Hearts	3–0	Falkirk	Tynecastle Stadium
	Robertson 54' (88), pen.' Crabbe 71'			Attendance: 8,198; Referee: DD Hope

8 August 1992 Scottish Premier Division	Dundee United	1–1	Hearts	Tannadice Park
	Ferguson 14'		Levein 71'	Attendance: 9,112

15 August 1992 Scottish Premier Division	Hearts	2–1	Partick Thistle	Tynecastle Stadium
	Mackay 61'; Baird 81'		Britton Pen.'	Attendance: 7,911

22 August 1992 Scottish Premier Division	Hibs	0–0	Hearts	Easter Road
				Attendance: 15,937

29 August 1992 Scottish Premier Division	Hearts	1–0	Motherwell	Tynecastle Stadium
	Berry			Attendance: 7,285

1 September 1992 Scottish Premier Division	Dundee	1–3	Hearts	Dens Park
	Dodds		Robertson; Ferguson; Levein	Attendance: 5,878; Referee: AM Roy

12 September 1992 Scottish Premier Division	Hearts	1–0	Aberdeen	Tynecastle Stadium
	Robertson			Attendance: 10,630

19 September 1992 Scottish Premier Division	Rangers	2–0	Hearts	Ibrox Stadium
	McCall McCoist			Attendance: 41,888; Referee: Donald McVicar

26 September 1992 Scottish Premier Division	Airdrieonians	1–0	Hearts	Broomfield Park
	Coyle			Attendance: 4,372

3 October 1992 Scottish Premier Division	Hearts	1–1	St Johnstone	Tynecastle Stadium
	Robertson 25'		Davies 47'	Attendance: 7,738

7 October 1992 Scottish Premier Division	Celtic	1–1	Hearts	Celtic Park
	Miller 6'		Preston 36'	Attendance: 26,049; Referee: DFT Syme

17 October 1992 Scottish Premier Division	Hearts	1–0	Dundee United	Tynecastle Stadium
	Hogg 82'			Attendance: 8,209

24 October 1992 Scottish Premier Division	Motherwell	1–3	Hearts	Fir Park
	Kirk		Robertson 19'; Martin (own goal); Ferguson 68'	Attendance: 5,171

31 October 1992 Scottish Premier Division	Hearts	1–0	Dundee	Tynecastle Stadium
	Baird 73'			Attendance: 7,452

7 November 1992 Scottish Premier Division	Hearts	1–0	Hibs	Tynecastle Stadium
	Baird 17'			Attendance: 17,342

10 November 1992 Scottish Premier Division	Partick Thistle	1–1	Hearts	Firhill Stadium
	Britton 48'		McLaren 35'	Attendance: 5,355; Referee: Eric Martindale

21 November 1992 Scottish Premier Division	Hearts	1–1	Rangers	Tynecastle Stadium
	Baird		McCoist	Attendance: 20,831

28 November 1992 Scottish Premier Division	Aberdeen	6–2	Hearts	Pittodrie
	Irvine; Shearer; Mason; Booth		Baird; Hogg	Attendance: 13,555

2 December 1992 Scottish Premier Division	Falkirk	2–1	Hearts	Brockville Park
	McCall 25'; Drinkell 33'		Robertson 45' (pen.)	Attendance: 5,475; Referee: JM Kelly

5 December 1992 Scottish Premier Division	Hearts	1–3	Airdrieonians	Tynecastle Stadium
	Baird		Coyle; Jack; Lawrence	Attendance: 6,665

12 December 1992 Scottish Premier Division	St Johnstone	1–1	Hearts	McDiarmid Park
	Wright		Ferguson	Attendance: 4,362

19 December 1992 Scottish Premier Division	Hearts	1–0	Celtic	Tynecastle Stadium
	Ferguson			Attendance: 13,554

26 December 1992 Scottish Premier Division	Hearts	1–1	Partick Thistle	Tynecastle Stadium
	Mackay		Britton	Attendance: 9,992

2 January 1993 Scottish Premier Division	Hibs	0–0	Hearts	Easter Road
				Attendance: 21,657; Referee: DD Hope

20 January 1993 Scottish Premier Division	Hearts	2–0	St Johnstone	Tynecastle Stadium
	Robertson; Baird	W Crombie		Attendance: 5,060

23 January 1993 Scottish Premier Division	Hearts	0–0	Motherwell	Tynecastle Stadium
				Attendance: 6,610

30 January 1993 Scottish Premier Division	Dundee United	0–1	Hearts	Tannadice Park
			Robertson	Attendance: 7,732

3 February 1993 Scottish Premier Division	Dundee	1–0	Hearts	Dens Park
	McGowan			Attendance: 4,182; Referee: LW Mottram

13 February 1993 Scottish Premier Division	Hearts	3–1	Falkirk	Tynecastle Stadium
	McKinlay; Thomas; Taylor (og.)		Cadette	Attendance: 7,700

20 February 1993 Scottish Premier Division	Airdrieonians	0–0	Hearts	Broomfield Park
				Attendance: 3,347; Referee: J Timmons

27 February 1993 Scottish Premier Division	Rangers	2–1	Hearts	Ibrox Stadium
	McCoist; Robertson		Millar	Attendance: 42,128

10 March 1993 Scottish Premier Division	Celtic	1–0	Hearts	Celtic Park
	Payton 85'			Attendance: 16,984; Referee: Hugh Williamson

13 March 1993 Scottish Premier Division	Hearts	1–0	Dundee United	Tynecastle Stadium
	Baird 20'			Attendance: 7,087

20 March 1993 Scottish Premier Division	Hearts	1–0	Hibs	Tynecastle Stadium
	Robertson 60'			Attendance: 13,740

27 March 1993 Scottish Premier Division	Partick Thistle	1–1	Hearts	Firhill Stadium
	Farningham		Preston	Attendance: 4,594

10 April 1993 Scottish Premier Division	Hearts	0–0	Dundee	Tynecastle Stadium
				Attendance: 6,033

14 April 1993 Scottish Premier Division	Hearts	2– 3	Rangers	Tynecastle Stadium
	Robertson 15'; Bannon 85'		Stuart McCall 43'; Hateley 62'	Attendance: 14,622; Referee: Kenny Clark

17 April 1993 Scottish Premier Division	Aberdeen	3–2	Hearts	Pittodrie
	Shearer 36'; Paatelainen 38'; Mason 48'		Levein; Ferguson	Attendance: 9,700; Referee: DFT Syme

20 April 1993 Scottish Premier Division	Motherwell	2–1	Hearts	Fir Park
	O'Donnell 5'; McGrillen 44'		Baird 67'	Attendance: 4,355; Referee: Jim McCluskey

1 May 1993 Scottish Premier Division	Falkirk	6–0	Hearts	Brockville Park
	Weir 33'; Wishart; Baptie Rice Cadette			Attendance: 4,124

5 May 1993 Scottish Premier Division	Hearts	1– 2	Aberdeen	Tynecastle Stadium
	Thomas 66'		Shearer 32'; Paatelainen 71'	Attendance: 6,038; Referee: WR Morrison

8 May 1993 Scottish Premier Division	Hearts	1–1	Airdrieonians	Tynecastle Stadium
	Johnston		Smith	Attendance: 5,104

15 May 1993 Scottish Premier Division	St Johnstone	3–1	Hearts	McDiarmid Park
	Torfason (pen.); Curran; Buglione		Harrison	Attendance: 3,900

== Scottish Premier Division table ==
Pos	Team	Pld	W	D	L	GF	GA	GD	Pts	Qualification or relegation
3	Celtic	44	24	12	8	68	41	+27	60	Qualification for the UEFA Cup first round
4	Dundee United	44	19	9	16	56	49	+7	47	Qualification for the UEFA Cup first round
5	Heart of Midlothian	44	15	14	15	46	51	−5	44	Qualification for the UEFA Cup first round
6	St Johnstone	44	10	20	14	52	66	−14	40	
7	Hibernian	44	12	13	19	54	64	−10	37	

Source: RSSSF
Rules for classification: 1) points; 2) goal difference; 3) number of goals scored.

== Stats ==
=== Squad information ===
No.	Pos	Nat	Player	Total		Scottish Premier Division		Scottish Cup		League Cup		Uefa Cup	
No.	Pos	Nat	Player	Apps	Goals	Apps	Goals	Apps	Goals	Apps	Goals	Apps	Goals
	GK	(Scotland) SCO	Henry Smith	32	0	25	0	0	0	3	0	4	0
	GK	(Scotland) SCO	Nicky Walker	22	0	18	0	4	0	0	0	0	0
	GK	(Scotland) SCO	Gary O'Connor	0	0	0	0	0	0	0	0	0	0
	DF	(Scotland) SCO	Craig Levein	46	4	37	3	3	0	3	0	3	1
	DF	(Scotland) SCO	Tosh McKinlay	44	2	34	1	3	0	3	1	4	0
	DF	(Scotland) SCO	Alan McLaren	43	2	34	1	4	0	2	1	3	0
	DF	(England) ENG	Glynn Snodin	34	2	27	0	2	1	2	0	3	1
	DF	(Scotland) SCO	Graeme Hogg	28	2	22	2	0	0	3	0	3	0
	DF	(Scotland) SCO	Allan Preston	24	4	21	2	3	2	0	0	0	0
	DF	(England) ENG	Adrian Boothroyd	6	2	4	0	2	2	0	0	0	0
	DF	(Scotland) SCO	Tommy Wilson	1	0	0	0	0	0	0	0	1	0
	MF	(Scotland) SCO	Gary Mackay	48	4	37	2	4	0	3	1	4	1
	MF	(Scotland) SCO	Derek Ferguson	47	2	37	1	4	1	3	0	3	0
	MF	(Scotland) SCO	John Millar	26	0	24	0	1	0	0	0	1	0
	MF	(Scotland) SCO	Ally Mauchlen	25	0	18	0	3	0	2	0	2	0
	MF	(Scotland) SCO	Eamonn Bannon	24	1	19	1	2	0	0	0	3	0
	MF	(Scotland) SCO	Neil Berry	20	1	17	1	1	0	1	0	1	0
	MF	(Netherlands) NED	Peter Van de Ven	45	0	37	0	3	0	1	0	4	0
	MF	(Scotland) SCO	Allan Johnston	2	1	2	1	0	0	0	0	0	0
	MF	(Scotland) SCO	Tommy Harrison	4	1	4	1	0	0	0	0	0	0
	MF	(Scotland) SCO	George Wright	15	0	12	0	1	0	1	0	1	0
	MF	(Scotland) SCO	Gary Locke	1	0	1	0	0	0	0	0	0	0
	MF	(England) ENG	John Sharples	0	0	0	0	0	0	0	0	0	0
	FW	(Scotland) SCO	John Robertson	53	15	42	11	4	3	3	1	4	0
	FW	(England) ENG	Ian Baird	43	11	34	9	4	1	2	0	3	1
	FW	(Scotland) SCO	Ian Ferguson	28	5	24	4	2	1	0	0	2	0
	FW	(England) ENG	Wayne Foster	17	0	11	0	1	0	3	0	2	0
	FW	(Scotland) SCO	Scott Crabbe	12	1	8	1	0	0	3	0	1	0
	FW	(Scotland) SCO	Kevin Thomas	5	2	4	2	1	0	0	0	0	0

== Scorers ==
Pos	PLayer	SPL	SC	LC	EU	Total
FW	(Scotland) John Robertson	11	3	1	0	15
FW	(England) Ian Baird	9	1	0	1	11
FW	(Scotland) Ian Ferguson	4	1	0	0	5
DF	(Scotland) Craig Levein	3	0	0	1	4
DF	(Scotland) Allan Preston	2	2	0	0	4
MF	(Scotland) Gary Mackay	2	0	1	1	4
DF	(Scotland) Graeme Hogg	2	0	0	0	2
FW	(Scotland) Kevin Thomas	2	0	0	0	2
MF	(Scotland) Derek Ferguson	1	1	0	1	2
DF	(Scotland) Tosh McKinlay	1	0	1	0	2
DF	(Scotland) Alan McLaren	1	0	1	0	2
DF	(England) Adrian Boothroyd	0	2	0	0	2
DF	(England) Glynn Snodin	0	1	0	1	2
FW	(Scotland) Scott Crabbe	1	0	0	0	1
MF	(Scotland) Eamonn Bannon	1	0	0	0	1
MF	(Scotland) Neil Berry	1	0	0	0	1
MF	(Scotland) Tommy Harrison	1	0	0	0	1
MF	(Scotland) Allan Johnston	1	0	0	0	1
MF	(Scotland) John Millar	1	0	0	0	1

== See also ==
- List of Heart of Midlothian F.C. seasons
