= 1993–94 Heart of Midlothian F.C. season =

Heart of Midlothian
1993–94 season
- Chairman: Wallace Mercer
- Manager: Sandy Clark
- Stadium: Tynecastle Stadium
- Scottish Premier Division: 7th
- UEFA Cup: First round
- Scottish Cup: Quarter-final
- League Cup: Third round
- Top goalscorer: League: John Robertson (8); All: John Robertson (12)
- Highest home attendance: 18,370 v Rangers Scottish Premier Division 3 November 1993
- Lowest home attendance: 5,332 v Stranraer League Cup 11 August 1993
- Average home league attendance: 11,010

The 1993–94 season was Heart of Midlothian F.C.'s 11th consecutive season of play in the Scottish Premier Division. Hearts also competed in the UEFA Cup, Scottish Cup and the Scottish League Cup.

== Fixtures ==
=== Friendlies ===
22 July 1993 Friendly	Kickers Emden	1–2	Hearts
	Goal		Johnston Locke	Attendance: 1,500

24 July 1993 Friendly	Melle	0–8	Hearts
			Ferguson Robertson Locke Mackay Thomas Wright	Attendance: 700

28 July 1993 Friendly	Cloppenburg	0–1	Hearts
			Boothroyd	Attendance: 600

30 July 1993 Friendly	Borussia Mönchengladbach	3–1	Hearts
	Goal		Robertson	Attendance: 3,500

31 July 1993 Friendly	Twente Enschede	3–1	Hearts
	Goal		Thomas	Attendance: 3,500

=== Uefa Cup ===
14 September 1993 UEFA Cup R1	Hearts	2–1	Atlético Madrid	Tynecastle Stadium
	Robertson 70' Colquhoun 75'		Kosecki 77'	Attendance: 15,596; Referee: Anders Frisk

28 September 1993 UEFA Cup R1	Atlético Madrid	3–0	Hearts	Estadio Vicente Calderón
	Martinez 34' Delgado 72' Postigo 76'			Attendance: 35,000; Referee: Guy Goethals

=== League Cup ===
11 August 1993 League Cup R2	Hearts	2–0	Stranraer	Tynecastle Stadium
	Robertson			Attendance: 5,332; Referee: Hugh Dallas

25 August 1993 League Cup R3	Hearts	0–1	Falkirk	Tynecastle Stadium
			May 90'	Attendance: 9,583; Referee: DD Hope

=== Scottish Cup ===
29 January 1994 Scottish Cup R3	Partick Thistle	0–1	Hearts	Firhill Stadium
			Johnston 44'	Attendance: 9,619; Referee: DFT Syme

20 February 1994 Scottish Cup R4	Hibs	1–2	Hearts	Easter Road
	Wright 42'		Robertson 2' Foster 87'	Attendance: 20,953; Referee: L W Mottram

12 March 1994 Scottish Cup QF	Rangers	2–0	Hearts	Ibrox Stadium
	Brown 49' Hateley 74'			Attendance: 41,666

=== Scottish Premier Division ===
7 August 1993 Scottish Premier Division	Rangers	2–1	Hearts	Ibrox Stadium
	Hagen; Hateley		Ferguson	Attendance: 42,320

14 August 1993 Scottish Premier Division	Hearts	1–0	Raith Rovers	Tynecastle Stadium
	Robertson			Attendance: 8,587

21 August 1993 Scottish Premier Division	Hearts	1–0	Hibernian	Tynecastle Stadium
	Johnston 7'			Attendance: 17,283; Referee: Jim McCluskey

28 August 1993 Scottish Premier Division	Dundee United	0–0	Hearts	Tannadice Park
				Attendance: 8,502

4 September 1993 Scottish Premier Division	Hearts	2–1	Partick Thistle	Tynecastle Stadium
	Levein 24'; Fashanu 37'		Britton 56'	Attendance: 7,273; Referee: Jim Herald

11 September 1993 Scottish Premier Division	Motherwell	2–0	Hearts	Fir Park
	O'Donnell 47'; McGrillen 86'			Attendance: 7,662; Referee: Eric Martindale

18 September 1993 Scottish Premier Division	Hearts	0–1	Kilmarnock	Tynecastle Stadium
			Skilling 32'	Attendance: 8,309

25 September 1993 Scottish Premier Division	Hearts	1–0	Celtic	Tynecastle Stadium
	Robertson 62'			Attendance: 14,761

2 October 1993 Scottish Premier Division	Dundee	2–0	Hearts	Dens Park
	Paterson; Ristic 21'			Attendance: 4,386

5 October 1993 Scottish Premier Division	Aberdeen	0–0	Hearts	Tannadice Park
				Attendance: 13,798; Referee: Hugh Williamson

9 October 1993 Scottish Premier Division	Hearts	1–1	St Johnstone	Tynecastle Stadium
	Robertson 71'		Wright 85' (pen.)	Attendance: 6,028; Referee: Willie Young

16 October 1993 Scottish Premier Division	Raith Rovers	1–0	Hearts	Stark's Park
	Hetherston			Attendance: 5,278; Referee: DD Hope

23 October 1993 Scottish Premier Division	Partick Thistle	0–0	Hearts	Firhill Stadium
				Attendance: 7,170

30 October 1993 Scottish Premier Division	Hibernian	0–2	Hearts	Easter Road
			Colquhoun	Attendance: 18,505

3 November 1993 Scottish Premier Division	Hearts	2–2	Rangers	Tynecastle Stadium
	Mackay 72'; Colquhoun 80'		Hateley 11' (44)	Attendance: 18,370; Referee: DFT Syme

6 November 1993 Scottish Premier Division	Hearts	1–1	Dundee United	Tynecastle Stadium
	Johnston		O'Neil	Attendance: 8,362

13 November 1993 Scottish Premier Division	Hearts	1–2	Dundee	Tynecastle Stadium
	Pittman og.'		Ritchie 8'; Czachowski 66'	Attendance: 7,681

20 November 1993 Scottish Premier Division	Celtic	0–0	Hearts	Celtic Park
				Attendance: 25,990

30 November 1993 Scottish Premier Division	Kilmarnock	0–0	Hearts	Rugby Park
				Attendance: 6,948; Referee: Jim McCluskey

4 December 1993 Scottish Premier Division	Hearts	1–1	Aberdeen	Tynecastle Stadium
	Colquhoun 5'		Shearer 75'	Attendance: 9,402; Referee: Bill Innes

11 December 1993 Scottish Premier Division	St Johnstone	2–0	Hearts	McDiarmid Park
	Scott; Davies			Attendance: 4,631

15 December 1993 Scottish Premier Division	Hearts	2–3	Motherwell	Tynecastle Stadium
	Johnston 11'; Leitch 66'		Coyne 41' (58); McKinnon 55'	Attendance: 5,531; Referee: Jim McCluskey

18 December 1993 Scottish Premier Division	Hearts	0–1	Raith Rovers	Tynecastle Stadium
			Sinclair	Attendance: 6,227

27 December 1993 Scottish Premier Division	Rangers	2–2	Hearts	Ibrox Stadium
	Hateley 21' (70)		Millar 10'; Robertson 93' (pen.)	Attendance: 45,116; Referee: Donald McVicar

8 January 1994 Scottish Premier Division	Dundee United	3–0	Hearts	Tannadice Park
	Crabbe 3'; Connolly 15'; Brewster 75'			Attendance: 8,583

12 January 1994 Scottish Premier Division	Hearts	1–1	Hibs	Tynecastle Stadium
	Millar 78'		Wright 54'	Attendance: 24,139; Referee: DFT Syme

15 January 1994 Scottish Premier Division	Hearts	1–0	Partick Thistle	Tynecastle Stadium
	Millar			Attendance: 7,619

22 January 1994 Scottish Premier Division	Hearts	1–1	Kilmarnock	Tynecastle Stadium
	Robertson 7'		MacPherson 42'	Attendance: 9,204; Referee: Jim McCluskey

5 February 1994 Scottish Premier Division	Motherwell	1–1	Hearts	Fir Park
	Mclaren 45' (og.)		Robertson 5'	Attendance: 7,009; Referee: Hugh Dallas

12 February 1994 Scottish Premier Division	Hearts	0–2	Celtic	Tynecastle Stadium
			Nicholas 44' (82)	Attendance: 14,049

1 March 1994 Scottish Premier Division	Dundee	0–2	Hearts	Dens Park
			Johnston 19' (pen.), 64'	Attendance: 3,965; Referee: DD Hope

5 March 1994 Scottish Premier Division	Aberdeen	0–1	Hearts	Pittodrie
			Leitch 31'	Attendance: 13,059; Referee: Hugh Dallas

19 March 1994 Scottish Premier Division	Raith Rovers	2–2	Hearts	Stark's Park
	McStay; Cameron		Colquhoun; Levein	Attendance: 5,697; Referee: Hugh Dallas

26 March 1994 Scottish Premier Division	Hearts	1–2	Rangers	Tynecastle Stadium
	Foster 84'		McCoist 34'; Hateley 54'	Attendance: 18,108

30 March 1994 Scottish Premier Division	Hearts	0–0	Motherwell	Tynecastle Stadium
				Attendance: 7,879; Referee: Jim Herald

2 April 1994 Scottish Premier Division	Kilmarnock	0–1	Hearts	Rugby Park
			Millar	Attendance: 8,022

6 April 1994 Scottish Premier Division	Hearts	2–2	St Johnstone	Tynecastle Stadium
	McGowne 7' (og.); Robertson 13'		Ferguson 11'; Scott 12'	Attendance: 8,938; Referee: WR Morrison

9 April 1994 Scottish Premier Division	Celtic	2–2	Hearts	Celtic Park
	Collins 24'; Vata 44'		Colquhoun 57'; Frail 88'	Attendance: 18,761

16 April 1994 Scottish Premier Division	Hearts	0–2	Dundee	Tynecastle Stadium
			Shaw 52' (69)	Attendance: 7,028

23 April 1994 Scottish Premier Division	St Johnstone	0–0	Hearts	McDiarmid Park
				Attendance: 6,762

27 April 1994 Scottish Premier Division	Hearts	1–1	Aberdeen	Tynecastle Stadium
	Robertson 60' (pen.)		Irvine 34'	Attendance: 13,811; Referee: Bobby Tait

30 April 1994 Scottish Premier Division	Hibernian	0–0	Hearts	Easter Road
				Attendance: 14,213; Referee: Donald McVicar

7 May 1994 Scottish Premier Division	Hearts	2–0	Dundee United	Tynecastle Stadium
	Frail 30'; Levein 53'			Attendance: 13,827

14 May 1994 Scottish Premier Division	Partick Thistle	0–1	Hearts	Firhill Stadium
			McLaren 87'	Attendance: 9,391

== Scottish Premier Division table ==
Pos	Team	Pld	W	D	L	GF	GA	GD	Pts	Qualification or relegation
5	Hibernian	44	16	15	13	53	48	+5	47	
6	Dundee United	44	11	20	13	47	48	−1	42	Qualification for the Cup Winners' Cup first round
7	Heart of Midlothian	44	11	20	13	37	43	−6	42	
8	Kilmarnock	44	12	16	16	36	45	−9	40	
9	Partick Thistle	44	12	16	16	46	57	−11	40	

Source: RSSSF
Rules for classification: 1) points; 2) goal difference; 3) number of goals scored.

== Stats ==
=== Squad information ===
No.	Pos	Nat	Player	Total		Scottish Premier Division		Scottish Cup		League Cup		Europa League	
No.	Pos	Nat	Player	Apps	Goals	Apps	Goals	Apps	Goals	Apps	Goals	Apps	Goals
	DF	(Scotland) SCO	Tosh McKinlay	50	0	43	0	3	0	2	0	2	0
	FW	(Scotland) SCO	John Colquhoun	48	7	41	6	3	0	2	0	2	1
	FW	(Scotland) SCO	John Robertson	43	12	36	8	3	1	2	2	2	1
	DF	(Scotland) SCO	Alan McLaren	42	1	37	1	3	0	0	0	2	0
	MF	(Scotland) SCO	Gary Mackay	42	1	36	1	2	0	2	0	2	0
	MF	(Scotland) SCO	Gary Locke	39	0	33	0	2	0	2	0	2	0
	DF	(Scotland) SCO	Craig Levein	37	3	30	3	3	0	2	0	2	0
	MF	(Scotland) SCO	Neil Berry	34	0	30	0	3	0	1	0	0	0
	GK	(Scotland) SCO	Henry Smith	34	0	27	0	3	0	2	0	2	0
	FW	(Scotland) SCO	Maurice Johnston	34	5	31	4	3	1	0	0	0	0
	MF	(Scotland) SCO	Scott Leitch	33	2	28	2	3	0	0	0	2	0
	DF	(Scotland) SCO	Jim Weir	29	0	26	0	2	0	0	0	1	0
	MF	(Scotland) SCO	Allan Johnston	29	1	27	1	0	0	2	0	0	0
	MF	(Scotland) SCO	John Millar	22	4	20	4	2	0	0	0	0	0
	FW	(England) ENG	Wayne Foster	21	2	18	1	3	1	0	0	0	0
	DF	(Scotland) SCO	Graeme Hogg	18	0	17	0	0	0	1	0	0	0
	GK	(Scotland) SCO	Nicky Walker	17	0	17	0	0	0	0	0	0	0
	FW	(Scotland) SCO	Kevin Thomas	16	0	12	0	0	0	2	0	2	0
	FW	(England) ENG	Justin Fashanu	15	1	11	1	0	0	2	0	2	0
	MF	(Scotland) SCO	George Wright	15	0	12	0	1	0	2	0	0	0
	DF	(Scotland) SCO	Stephen Frail	9	2	9	2	0	0	0	0	0	0
	FW	(Scotland) SCO	Ian Ferguson	7	1	6	1	0	0	0	0	1	0
	MF	(Netherlands) NED	Peter Van de Ven	3	0	2	0	0	0	1	0	0	0
	MF	(Scotland) SCO	Ally Mauchlen	1	0	0	0	0	0	1	0	0	0
	MF	(Scotland) SCO	Tommy Harrison	1	0	1	0	0	0	0	0	0	0
	DF	(England) ENG	Adrian Boothroyd	0	0	0	0	0	0	0	0	0	0
	DF	(Scotland) SCO	Paul Ritchie	0	0	0	0	0	0	0	0	0	0
	FW	(Scotland) SCO	Sandy Clark	0	0	0	0	0	0	0	0	0	0
	DF	(Scotland) SCO	Alan McManus	0	0	0	0	0	0	0	0	0	0
	GK	(Scotland) SCO	Gary O'Connor	0	0	0	0	0	0	0	0	0	0

- Last updated: 6 October 2010
- Source: Wikipedia players' articles, Heart of Midlothian, Sky Sports
- Ordered by Squad Number.

Appearances (starts and substitute appearances) and goals include those in Scottish Premier Division, Scottish Cup, League Cup and the UEFA Cup.

Squad only includes players currently registered with the club and those with professional contracts only.

=== Scorers ===
Pos	PLayer	SPL	SC	LC	CWC	Total
FW	(Scotland) John Robertson	8	1	2	1	12
FW	(Scotland) John Colquhoun	6	0	0	1	7
FW	(Scotland) Maurice Johnston	4	1	0	0	5
MF	(Scotland) John Millar	4	0	0	0	4
DF	(Scotland) Craig Levein	3	0	0	0	3
MF	(Scotland) Stephen Frail	2	0	0	0	2
MF	(Scotland) Scott Leitch	2	0	0	0	2
FW	(England) Wayne Foster	1	1	0	0	2
FW	(Scotland) Ian Ferguson	1	0	0	0	1
MF	(Scotland) Allan Johnston	1	0	0	0	1
MF	(Scotland) Gary Mackay	1	0	0	0	1
MF	(England) Justin Fashanu	1	0	0	0	1
DF	(Scotland) Alan McLaren	1	0	0	0	1

== See also ==
- List of Heart of Midlothian F.C. seasons
