= Neil Berry =

Neil Berry may refer to:

- Neil Berry (baseball) (1922–2016), Major League Baseball infielder
- Neil Berry (footballer) (born 1963), Scottish football player
