= 1986–87 in Scottish football =

Premier Division champions
- Rangers

Division One champions
- Morton

Division Two champions
- Meadowbank Thistle

Scottish Cup winners
- St Mirren

League Cup winners
- Rangers

Junior Cup winners
- Auchinleck Talbot

Teams in Europe
- Aberdeen, Celtic, Dundee United, Heart of Midlothian, Rangers

Scotland national team
- UEFA Euro 1988 qualifying, Rous Cup
- ← 1985–86 1987–88 →

The 1986–87 season was the 90th season of competitive football in Scotland.

In the first full season under the management of player-manager Graeme Souness, Rangers won their first league title since 1978, and also won the League Cup. The title winning side featured two English players enjoying their first season north of the border - defender Terry Butcher and goalkeeper Chris Woods.

Celtic manager David Hay paid the price for a trophyless season and was sacked after four years, paving the way for the return of Billy McNeill, the man he had succeeded in 1983.

Aberdeen manager Alex Ferguson moved south of the border on 6 November to manage Manchester United. He was succeeded at Pittodrie by Ian Porterfield. At the end of the season, Ferguson brought Celtic's top scorer Brian McClair to United, while McClair's strike-partner Mo Johnston moved to France to sign for Nantes.

St Mirren won the Scottish Cup with a 1–0 win over Dundee United in the final. Dundee United also lost to IFK Goteborg of Sweden in the UEFA Cup final.

== Scottish Premier Division ==
Pos	Team	Pld	W	D	L	GF	GA	GD	Pts	Qualification or relegation
1	Rangers (C)	44	31	7	6	85	23	+62	69	Qualification for the European Cup first round
2	Celtic	44	27	9	8	90	41	+49	63	Qualification for the UEFA Cup first round
3	Dundee United	44	24	12	8	66	36	+30	60	Qualification for the UEFA Cup first round
4	Aberdeen	44	21	16	7	63	29	+34	58	Qualification for the UEFA Cup first round
5	Heart of Midlothian	44	21	14	9	64	43	+21	56	
6	Dundee	44	18	12	14	74	57	+17	48	
7	St Mirren	44	12	12	20	36	51	−15	36	Qualification for the Cup Winners' Cup first round
8	Motherwell	44	11	12	21	43	64	−21	34	
9	Hibernian	44	10	13	21	44	70	−26	33	
10	Falkirk	44	8	10	26	31	70	−39	26	
11	Clydebank (R)	44	6	12	26	35	93	−58	24	Relegation to the 1987–88 Scottish First Division
12	Hamilton Academical (R)	44	6	9	29	39	93	−54	21	Relegation to the 1987–88 Scottish First Division

Source: Statto
Rules for classification: 1) points; 2) goal difference; 3) number of goals scored.
(C) Champions; (R) Relegated

Champions: Rangers
Relegated: Clydebank, Hamilton Academical

== Scottish League Division One ==
Pos	Team	Pld	W	D	L	GF	GA	GD	Pts	Promotion or relegation
1	Morton (C, P)	44	24	9	11	88	56	+32	57	Promotion to the Premier Division
2	Dunfermline Athletic (P)	44	23	10	11	61	41	+20	56	Promotion to the Premier Division
3	Dumbarton	44	23	7	14	67	52	+15	53	
4	East Fife	44	15	21	8	68	55	+13	51	
5	Airdrieonians	44	20	11	13	58	46	+12	51	
6	Kilmarnock	44	17	11	16	62	53	+9	45	
7	Forfar Athletic	44	14	15	15	61	63	−2	43	
8	Partick Thistle	44	12	15	17	49	54	−5	39	
9	Clyde	44	11	16	17	48	56	−8	38	
10	Queen of the South	44	11	12	21	50	71	−21	34	
11	Brechin City (R)	44	11	10	23	44	72	−28	32	Relegation to the Second Division
12	Montrose (R)	44	9	11	24	37	74	−37	29	Relegation to the Second Division

Source: RSSSF and statto
Rules for classification: 1) points; 2) goal difference; 3) number of goals scored.
(C) Champions; (P) Promoted; (R) Relegated

Promoted: Morton, Dunfermline Athletic
Relegated: Brechin City, Montrose

== Scottish League Division Two ==
Pos	Team	Pld	W	D	L	GF	GA	GD	Pts	Promotion
1	Meadowbank Thistle (C, P)	39	23	9	7	69	38	+31	55	Promotion to the First Division
2	Raith Rovers (P)	39	16	20	3	73	44	+29	52	Promotion to the First Division
3	Stirling Albion	39	20	12	7	55	33	+22	52	
4	Ayr United	39	22	8	9	70	49	+21	52	
5	St Johnstone	39	16	13	10	59	49	+10	45	
6	Alloa Athletic	39	17	7	15	48	50	−2	41	
7	Cowdenbeath	39	16	8	15	59	55	+4	40	
8	Albion Rovers	39	15	9	15	48	51	−3	39	
9	Queen's Park	39	9	19	11	48	49	−1	37	
10	Stranraer	39	9	11	19	41	59	−18	29	
11	Arbroath	39	11	7	21	46	66	−20	29	
12	Stenhousemuir	39	10	9	20	37	58	−21	29	
13	East Stirlingshire	39	6	11	22	33	56	−23	23	
14	Berwick Rangers	39	8	7	24	40	69	−29	23	

Source: "1986-1987 Second Division - SPFL Archive". SPFL.
Rules for classification: 1) points; 2) goal difference; 3) number of goals scored.
(C) Champions; (P) Promoted

Promoted: Meadowbank Thistle, Raith Rovers

== Other honours ==
=== Cup honours ===
Competition	Winner	Score	Runner-up
Scottish Cup 1986–87	St Mirren	1 – 0 (a.e.t.)	Dundee United
League Cup 1986–87	Rangers	2 – 1	Celtic
Youth Cup	Celtic	2 – 1	Motherwell
Junior Cup	Auchinleck Talbot	1 – 0 (rep.)	Kilbirnie Ladeside

=== Non-league honours ===
==== Senior ====
Competition	Winner
Highland League 1986–87	Inverness Thistle
East of Scotland League	Vale of Leithen
South of Scotland League	Annan Athletic

=== Individual honours ===
Award	Winner	Club
Footballer of the Year	(Scotland) Brian McClair	Celtic
Players' Player of the Year	(Scotland) Brian McClair	Celtic
Young Player of the Year	(Scotland) Robert Fleck	Rangers

== Scotland national team ==
Date	Venue	Opponents	Score	Competition	Scotland scorer(s)
10 September	Hampden Park, Glasgow (H)	Bulgaria	0–0	ECQG7	
15 October	Lansdowne Road, Dublin (A)	Republic of Ireland	0–0	ECQG7	
12 November	Hampden Park, Glasgow (H)	Luxembourg	3–0	ECQG7	Davie Cooper (2, 1 pen.), Maurice Johnston
18 February	Hampden Park, Glasgow (H)	Republic of Ireland	0–1	ECQG7	
1 April	Constant Vanden Stock Stadium, Brussels (A)	Belgium	1–4	ECQG7	Paul McStay
23 May	Hampden Park, Glasgow (H)	England	0–0	Rous Cup	
26 May	Hampden Park, Glasgow (H)	Brazil	0–2	Rous Cup	

Key:

- (H) = Home match
- (A) = Away match
- ECQG7 = European Championship qualifying - Group 7

== See also ==
- 1986–87 Aberdeen F.C. season
- 1986–87 Dundee United F.C. season
- Dubai Champions Cup
