= 1986–87 Scottish Cup =

Tournament details
- Country: Scotland

Final positions
- Champions: St Mirren
- Runners-up: Dundee United

The 1986–87 Scottish Cup was the 102nd staging of Scotland's most prestigious football knockout competition. The Cup was won by St Mirren who defeated Dundee United in the final.

== First round ==
Home team	Score	Away team
Forres Mechanics	0 – 1	Berwick Rangers
Albion Rovers	2 – 1	Arbroath
Ayr United	3 – 1	Annan Athletic
Caledonian	2 – 2	Alloa
Peterhead	1 – 0	East Stirlingshire
Stirling Albion	3 – 0	Cowdenbeath

=== Replay ===
Home team	Score	Away team
Alloa	0 – 1	Caledonian

== Second round ==
Home team	Score	Away team
Albion Rovers	1 – 2	Whitehill Welfare
Raith Rovers	4 – 0	Vale of Leithen
St Johnstone	4 – 1	Queen's Park
Stenhousemuir	0 – 0	Berwick Rangers
Stirling Albion	0 – 1	Meadowbank Thistle
Caledonian	5 – 0	Spartans
Rothes	1 – 3	Peterhead
Stranraer	1 – 1	Ayr United

=== Replays ===
Home team	Score	Away team
Berwick Rangers	2 – 0	Stenhousemuir
Ayr United	2 – 0	Stranraer

== Third round ==
Home team	Score	Away team
St Johnstone	4 – 0	Whitehill Welfare
Dundee	2 – 2	East Fife
Falkirk	0 – 0	Clydebank
Meadowbank Thistle	2 – 0	Ayr United
Motherwell	3 – 1	Partick Thistle
Aberdeen	2 – 2	Celtic
Berwick Rangers	0 – 2	Morton
Brechin City	2 – 2	Dumbarton
Dundee United	1 – 1	Airdrieonians
Heart of Midlothian	0 – 0	Kilmarnock
Hibernian	2 – 0	Dunfermline Athletic
Montrose	1 – 2	Forfar Athletic
Peterhead	2 – 0	Clyde
Queen of the South	0 – 1	Raith Rovers
Rangers	0 – 1	Hamilton Academical
St Mirren	3 – 0	Caledonian

=== Replays ===
Home team	Score	Away team
Airdrieonians	1 – 2	Dundee United
Clydebank	3 – 1	Falkirk
East Fife	1 – 4	Dundee
Celtic	0 – 0	Aberdeen
Dumbarton	2 – 3	Brechin City
Kilmarnock	1 – 1	Heart of Middlothian

==== Second Replays ====
Home team	Score	Away team
Aberdeen	0 – 1	Celtic
Kilmarnock	1 – 3	Heart of Midlothian

== Fourth round ==
Home team	Score	Away team
Brechin City	0 – 1	Dundee United
Clydebank	1 – 0	Hibernian
Dundee	1 – 1	Meadowbank Thistle
Hamilton Academical	1 – 2	Motherwell
Heart of Midlothian	1 – 0	Celtic
Morton	2 – 3	St Mirren
Raith Rovers	2 – 2	Peterhead
St Johnstone	1 – 2	Forfar Athletic

=== Replays ===
Home team	Score	Away team
Peterhead	3 – 3	Raith Rovers
Meadowbank Thistle	1 – 1	Dundee

==== Second Replays ====
Home team	Score	Away team
Dundee	2 – 0	Meadowbank Thistle
Raith Rovers	3 – 0	Peterhead

== Quarter-finals ==
Home team	Score	Away team
Clydebank	0 – 4	Dundee
Dundee United	2 – 2	Forfar Athletic
Heart of Midlothian	1 – 1	Motherwell
Raith Rovers	0 – 2	St Mirren

=== Replays ===
Home team	Score	Away team
Forfar Athletic	0 – 2	Dundee United
Motherwell	0 – 1	Heart of Midlothian

== Semi-finals ==
11 April 1987

Heart of Midlothian	1–2	St Mirren
Gary Mackay 74'		Ian Ferguson 33'; Frank McGarvey 82'

Hampden Park, Glasgow
Attendance: 32,390
Referee: Bill Crombie

11 April 1987

Dundee	2–3	Dundee United
Tommy Coyne; Keith Wright		Iain Ferguson; Paul Hegarty

Tynecastle Park, Edinburgh
Attendance: 13,319

== Final ==
16 May 1987

St Mirren	1–0 (a.e.t.)	Dundee United
Ferguson 110'

Hampden Park, Glasgow
Attendance: 51,782
Referee: Kenny Hope

== See also ==
- 1986–87 in Scottish football
- 1986–87 Scottish League Cup
