= 1986–87 Scottish Premier Division =

81st season of top-tier football league in Scotland

Scottish Premier Division
- Season: 1986–87
- Champions: Rangers; 3rd Premier Division title 38th Scottish title
- Relegated: Clydebank; Hamilton Academical
- European Cup: Rangers
- UEFA Cup: Celtic; Dundee United; Aberdeen
- Cup Winners' Cup: St Mirren
- Matches: 264
- Goals: 670 (2.54 per match)
- Top goalscorer: Brian McClair (35)
- Biggest home win: Heart of Midlothian 7–0 Hamilton Academical
- Biggest away win: Clydebank 0–5 Aberdeen

The 1986–87 Scottish Premier Division season was won by Rangers, six points ahead of Celtic. Clydebank and Hamilton Academical were relegated.

== Table ==
Pos	Team	Pld	W	D	L	GF	GA	GD	Pts	Qualification or relegation
1	Rangers (C)	44	31	7	6	85	23	+62	69	Qualification for the European Cup first round
2	Celtic	44	27	9	8	90	41	+49	63	Qualification for the UEFA Cup first round
3	Dundee United	44	24	12	8	66	36	+30	60	Qualification for the UEFA Cup first round
4	Aberdeen	44	21	16	7	63	29	+34	58	Qualification for the UEFA Cup first round
5	Heart of Midlothian	44	21	14	9	64	43	+21	56	
6	Dundee	44	18	12	14	74	57	+17	48	
7	St Mirren	44	12	12	20	36	51	−15	36	Qualification for the Cup Winners' Cup first round
8	Motherwell	44	11	12	21	43	64	−21	34	
9	Hibernian	44	10	13	21	44	70	−26	33	
10	Falkirk	44	8	10	26	31	70	−39	26	
11	Clydebank (R)	44	6	12	26	35	93	−58	24	Relegation to the 1987–88 Scottish First Division
12	Hamilton Academical (R)	44	6	9	29	39	93	−54	21	Relegation to the 1987–88 Scottish First Division

Source: Statto
Rules for classification: 1) points; 2) goal difference; 3) number of goals scored.
(C) Champions; (R) Relegated

== Results ==
=== Matches 1–22 ===
During matches 1-22 each team plays every other team twice (home and away).

Home \ Away	ABE	CEL	CLY	DND	DNU	FAL	HAM	HOM	HIB	MOT	RAN	STM
Aberdeen		1–1	4–0	2–0	2–0	1–0	2–0	0–1	4–0	2–2	1–0	0–0
Celtic	1–1		6–0	1–0	1–0	4–2	4–1	2–0	5–1	3–1	1–1	2–0
Clydebank	1–3	0–1		0–2	0–0	1–2	2–1	0–3	0–0	2–3	1–4	1–1
Dundee	0–2	0–3	3–3		0–2	3–0	3–3	0–0	3–0	1–1	1–0	2–1
Dundee United	2–1	2–2	2–0	0–3		2–0	3–0	1–0	1–0	4–0	0–0	3–0
Falkirk	3–3	0–1	1–0	0–1	2–1		0–0	2–0	1–1	1–1	1–5	1–1
Hamilton Academical	0–1	1–2	0–1	0–3	1–5	1–2		1–3	1–4	0–3	1–2	1–1
Heart of Midlothian	2–1	1–0	2–1	3–1	2–2	1–0	1–0		1–1	4–0	1–1	0–0
Hibernian	1–1	0–1	3–2	0–3	1–1	1–0	1–3	1–3		0–0	2–1	0–1
Motherwell	0–1	0–4	0–1	0–0	0–2	2–2	1–1	2–3	4–1		0–2	1–1
Rangers	2–0	1–0	4–0	2–1	2–3	1–0	2–0	3–0	3–0	0–1		2–0
St Mirren	1–1	0–1	0–1	4–1	0–1	1–0	2–1	0–0	3–1	1–0	0–1	

Legend: Blue = home team win; Yellow = draw; Red = away team win.

=== Matches 23–44 ===
During matches 23-44 each team plays every other team twice (home and away).

Home \ Away	ABE	CEL	CLY	DND	DNU	FAL	HAM	HOM	HIB	MOT	RAN	STM
Aberdeen		1–0	1–1	2–1	0–1	3–1	0–0	2–1	1–0	1–0	1–1	0–1
Celtic	1–1		3–0	2–0	1–1	1–2	8–3	1–1	1–0	3–1	3–1	3–0
Clydebank	0–5	1–1		1–1	1–2	2–1	2–3	1–1	1–2	0–0	0–3	2–1
Dundee	1–1	4–1	4–1		1–1	4–0	7–3	0–1	2–0	4–1	0–4	6–3
Dundee United	0–0	3–2	1–1	1–1		2–1	2–1	3–1	2–1	2–0	0–1	2–0
Falkirk	0–3	1–2	0–0	0–0	1–2		0–2	0–0	1–3	1–0	1–2	0–0
Hamilton Academical	0–2	2–3	0–0	1–1	0–0	0–1		0–1	0–1	4–2	0–2	1–0
Heart of Midlothian	1–1	1–0	3–0	1–3	1–1	4–0	7–0		2–1	1–1	2–5	1–0
Hibernian	1–1	1–4	4–1	2–2	0–2	2–0	1–1	2–2		0–1	0–0	1–0
Motherwell	0–2	1–1	3–2	2–0	1–0	1–0	3–0	0–1	2–1		0–1	1–2
Rangers	0–0	2–0	5–0	2–0	2–0	4–0	2–0	3–0	1–1	1–0		1–0
St Mirren	1–0	1–3	3–1	0–1	2–1	1–0	0–1	0–0	1–1	1–1	1–3	

Legend: Blue = home team win; Yellow = draw; Red = away team win.

== Awards ==
- Player awards

Award	Winner	Club
PFA Players' Player of the Year	(Scotland) Brian McClair	Celtic
PFA Young Player of the Year	(Scotland) Robert Fleck	Rangers
SFWA Footballer of the Year	(Scotland) Brian McClair	Celtic

- Manager awards

Award	Winner	Club
SFWA Manager of the Year	(Scotland) Jim McLean	Dundee United
