= 1987–88 Scottish Premier Division =

82nd season of top-tier football league in Scotland

Scottish Premier Division
- Season: 1987–88
- Champions: Celtic; 6th Premier Division title 35th Scottish title
- Relegated: Falkirk; Dunfermline Athletic; Morton
- European Cup: Celtic
- UEFA Cup: Heart of Midlothian; Rangers; Aberdeen
- Cup Winners' Cup: Dundee United
- Matches: 264
- Goals: 646 (2.45 per match)
- Top goalscorer: Tommy Coyne (33)

The 1987–88 Scottish Premier Division season was won by Celtic, ten points ahead of Heart of Midlothian. Due to a league contraction to ten teams Falkirk, Dunfermline Athletic and Morton were relegated.

== Table ==
Pos	Team	Pld	W	D	L	GF	GA	GD	Pts	Qualification or relegation
1	Celtic (C)	44	31	10	3	79	23	+56	72	Qualification for the European Cup first round
2	Heart of Midlothian	44	23	16	5	74	32	+42	62	Qualification for the UEFA Cup first round
3	Rangers	44	26	8	10	85	34	+51	60	Qualification for the UEFA Cup first round
4	Aberdeen	44	21	17	6	56	25	+31	59	Qualification for the UEFA Cup first round
5	Dundee United	44	16	15	13	54	47	+7	47	Qualification for the Cup Winners' Cup first round
6	Hibernian	44	12	19	13	41	42	−1	43	
7	Dundee	44	17	7	20	70	64	+6	41	
8	Motherwell	44	13	10	21	37	56	−19	36	
9	St Mirren	44	10	15	19	41	64	−23	35	
10	Falkirk (R)	44	10	11	23	41	75	−34	31	Relegation to the 1988–89 Scottish First Division
11	Dunfermline Athletic (R)	44	8	10	26	41	84	−43	26	Relegation to the 1988–89 Scottish First Division
12	Morton (R)	44	3	10	31	27	100	−73	16	Relegation to the 1988–89 Scottish First Division

Source: Statto
Rules for classification: 1) points; 2) goal difference; 3) number of goals scored.
(C) Champions; (R) Relegated

== Results ==
=== Matches 1–22 ===
During matches 1-22 each team plays every other team twice (home and away).

Home \ Away	ABE	CEL	DND	DNU	DNF	FAL	HOM	HIB	MOR	MOT	RAN	STM
Aberdeen		0–1	0–0	1–1	3–0	3–1	0–0	1–1	3–1	1–0	2–0	2–0
Celtic	2–2		5–0	1–2	4–0	3–2	1–0	1–1	3–1	4–1	1–0	1–0
Dundee	1–1	1–1		1–1	5–0	3–1	1–3	2–1	1–0	2–0	0–1	0–2
Dundee United	0–0	0–0	1–3		1–0	3–0	0–3	1–2	3–1	1–1	1–0	2–3
Dunfermline Athletic	0–3	2–1	0–1	0–0		0–0	0–1	3–3	4–1	0–1	0–4	2–0
Falkirk	2–2	0–1	0–3	4–1	0–0		1–5	1–1	2–0	3–0	0–1	1–3
Heart of Midlothian	2–1	1–1	4–2	4–1	3–2	4–2		1–0	3–0	1–0	0–0	0–0
Hibernian	0–2	0–1	0–4	0–1	4–0	1–0	2–1		0–0	1–0	1–0	1–1
Morton	0–0	0–4	4–3	0–1	1–2	4–1	1–2	3–3		1–1	0–3	0–0
Motherwell	0–1	0–2	0–2	2–1	3–2	1–2	0–3	1–0	1–0		0–1	2–1
Rangers	0–1	2–2	2–1	1–1	4–0	4–0	3–2	1–0	7–0	1–0		3–1
St Mirren	1–3	0–1	1–2	2–0	1–1	2–2	1–1	2–2	2–1	1–0	2–2	

Legend: Blue = home team win; Yellow = draw; Red = away team win.

=== Matches 23–44 ===
During matches 23-44 each team plays every other team twice (home and away).

Home \ Away	ABE	CEL	DND	DNU	DNF	FAL	HOM	HIB	MOR	MOT	RAN	STM
Aberdeen		0–1	1–0	0–0	1–0	2–0	0–0	0–2	4–0	0–0	1–2	2–1
Celtic	0–0		3–0	0–0	1–0	2–0	2–2	2–0	1–0	1–0	2–0	2–0
Dundee	1–2	1–2		0–2	2–0	4–2	0–0	0–0	1–0	1–2	2–3	2–1
Dundee United	0–2	1–2	1–0		2–2	0–0	0–0	1–2	2–0	3–1	1–1	5–1
Dunfermline Athletic	1–1	0–4	6–1	0–3		0–1	0–4	1–0	1–1	1–1	0–3	2–1
Falkirk	0–2	0–2	0–6	1–2	1–0		2–1	1–0	4–1	0–0	0–5	3–0
Heart of Midlothian	2–2	2–1	2–0	1–1	2–1	1–0		0–0	2–0	1–1	1–1	0–1
Hibernian	0–0	0–2	2–1	0–0	2–0	0–0	0–0		3–1	1–1	0–2	0–0
Morton	0–2	0–4	1–7	0–4	0–3	0–0	0–0	1–1		0–2	3–2	0–2
Motherwell	2–1	0–1	3–3	4–2	3–2	0–0	0–2	0–2	1–0		0–2	2–1
Rangers	0–1	1–2	2–0	1–0	2–2	3–1	1–2	1–1	5–0	1–0		4–0
St Mirren	0–0	1–1	1–0	0–1	4–1	0–0	0–6	1–1	0–0	0–0	0–3	

Legend: Blue = home team win; Yellow = draw; Red = away team win.

== Awards ==
- Player awards

Award	Winner	Club
PFA Players' Player of the Year	(Scotland) Paul McStay	Celtic
PFA Young Player of the Year	(Scotland) John Collins	Hibernian
SFWA Footballer of the Year	(Scotland) Paul McStay	Celtic

- Manager awards

Award	Winner	Club
SFWA Manager of the Year	(Scotland) Billy McNeill	Celtic

== See also ==
- Rangers F.C. 2–2 Celtic F.C. (1987)
