= Brian Whittaker (footballer) =

Scottish footballer

Personal information
- Date of birth: 23 September 1956
- Place of birth: Glasgow, Scotland
- Date of death: 7 September 1997 (aged 40)
- Place of death: Edinburgh, Scotland
- Height: 6 ft 0 in (1.83 m)
- Position: Defender

Youth career
- Sighthill Amateurs

Senior career*
Years	Team	Apps	(Gls)
1974–1983	Partick Thistle	241	(4)
1983–1984	Celtic	10	(2)
1984–1990	Heart of Midlothian	162	(1)
1990–1992	Falkirk	31	(1)
Total		444	(8)

International career
1978–1980	Scottish League XI	2	(0)
- * Club domestic league appearances and goals

Brian Whittaker (23 September 1956 – 7 September 1997) was a Scottish professional footballer who played for Partick Thistle, Celtic, Heart of Midlothian and Falkirk.

== Career ==
Left-back Whittaker came to prominence whilst playing over 350 games for Partick Thistle in all competitions between 1974 and 1983, eventually becoming one of manager David Hay's first signings for Celtic in August 1983 for a fee of £50,000.

In May 1984 he was sold to Hearts for £25,000 and spent six years as a player at Tynecastle Park. Whittaker was an integral part of the Hearts team which was pipped to the league title by Celtic in the last minutes of the 1985–86 Scottish Premier Division season, and also played on the losing side in the 1986 Scottish Cup Final.

Whittaker spent some time at Falkirk before returning to Hearts as a coach, then moving on to working as an agent. He was killed in a car crash on Sunday 7 September 1997.

== Honours ==
Heart of Midlothian

- Scottish Cup: runner-up 1986
