= Dave McPherson (footballer) =

Scottish footballer

Personal information
- Full name: David McPherson
- Date of birth: 28 January 1964 (age 62)
- Place of birth: Paisley, Scotland
- Height: 6 ft 3 in (1.91 m)
- Position: Defender

Youth career
- Pollok United
- Gartcosh United
- 1980–1982: Rangers

Senior career*
Years	Team	Apps	(Gls)
1982–1987	Rangers	205	(19)
1987–1992	Heart of Midlothian	189	(16)
1992–1994	Rangers	71	(3)
1994–1999	Heart of Midlothian	105	(8)
1999–2000	Carlton S.C.	42	(7)
2001–2002	Greenock Morton	16	(4)
Total		628	(57)

International career
1983–1988	Scotland U21	4	(0)
1989–1993	Scotland	27	(0)
1990	Scotland B	2	(0)
1990	SFA (SFL centenary)	1	(0)

Managerial career
- 2002: Greenock Morton
- * Club domestic league appearances and goals

David McPherson (born 28 January 1964, in Paisley) is a Scottish former international footballer who played as a defender, best known for his spells with Rangers and Heart of Midlothian, spending two periods with each club.

== Career ==
=== Early years at Rangers ===
McPherson began at amateurs Gartcosh United before starting his professional career with boyhood favourites Rangers in 1980, breaking into the first team while still a teenager.

His impressive form ensured he achieved Under 21 recognition, as well as a place in the Rangers first team, by 1983; that year he scored four goals in one match against Malta's Valletta in the 1983–84 European Cup Winners' Cup, the first Rangers player to achieve that goalscoring feat in a European fixture. However, by their own high standards Rangers were enduring a mediocre spell, limiting McPherson's initial success at Ibrox to one league title in 1986–87 (his final season, in which he played in 42 of the league fixtures) and two League Cups in March 1984 and October 1984 (after the schedule was changed from a spring final to autumn). He missed the 1986 showpiece due to suspension.

=== First spell at Hearts ===
The revolution brought about by the arrival of Graeme Souness (and numerous new signings) at Rangers led to McPherson being deemed surplus to requirements, and he was sold to Hearts for £325,000 in 1987. He soon became a regular in the Tynecastle line-up, helping Hearts achieve regular high league finishes while enhancing his own reputation. Within two years he became both a Scotland international and club captain. However, despite several close calls, the Jambos were unable to break their trophy famine and when debts began to rise, McPherson, by then the club's most valuable asset, was sold back to Rangers in 1992, for £1.3m.

=== Return to Rangers ===
McPherson's second spell at Rangers was much more successful than the first, as he helped Walter Smith's dominant side achieve the treble in 1992–93, then a double in the 1993–94 season. McPherson started each of those finals (as well as the 1994 Scottish Cup Final which was a rare defeat, McPherson partly culpable for Dundee United's winning goal), totalling 90 appearances over the two campaigns. The flipside to this success, however was the continual arrival of internationally renowned players competing for positions, and McPherson again found himself relegated to the bench by 1994.

=== Second spell at Hearts ===
Financial troubles at Hearts dictated McPherson's next move, as he returned to the Edinburgh club in part exchange for Alan McLaren, Rangers also paying Hearts £1.25m. By now approaching the veteran stage, McPherson played an important role in nurturing Hearts' next generation of defenders such as Paul Ritchie and Gary Locke. He also helped the club to victory over Rangers in the 1998 Scottish Cup Final, their first silverware in 36 years, having lost the 1996 Scottish Cup Final to the same opponents. He is ranked as 20th on Hearts' all-time appearances list (375 matches) despite only having spent half of his career with the club.

After leaving Tynecastle in the summer of 1999, McPherson wound down his playing career in Australia with Carlton S.C. in Melbourne, and back in Scotland with Greenock Morton, where he combined playing with a coaching role for one season in 2001–02 before concentrating on coaching.

== International career ==
McPherson was first selected to play for Scotland against Cyprus on 26 April 1989, a match Scotland won 2–1 at Hampden Park. Despite remaining a relative novice at international level, he was selected in the Scotland squad for the 1990 FIFA World Cup, appearing in all three group games as Scotland just missed qualification for the knockout stages. McPherson's solid performances resulted in him then becoming a fixture in the national side, missing only one qualifying game as Scotland reached the 1992 Euro Championships. He started all three group matches in Sweden, but again Scotland failed to qualify for the knockout stages.

McPherson's international form began to waver the following season, though, and when Scotland were thrashed 5–0 in a World Cup qualifying game in Lisbon in April 1993, the Scottish press and public called for radical surgery. McPherson was one of several older players to be dropped, never to play for the national side again.

== Playing style ==
McPherson's height (6 ft 3) ensured he was a commanding presence defensively, as well as a potent attacking weapon, both as a goalscoring threat and a target man for flick-ons. Known as 'Slim', he saw himself as a ball-playing defender and was an admirer of the Dutch player Ruud Krol as a child. Despite his stature he was also quite an adept dribbler, and his sporadic runs from defence were renowned, particularly when playing as part of a three-man central defence with Hearts. These runs were used to devastating effect in some big matches for Hearts, such as the 3–1 victory over Celtic in November 1991, and the 4–2 victory over Rangers during the Scottish Cup tie at Tynecastle in February 1995. This ability also led to him sometimes being deployed in central midfield or at right-back, as opposed to his usual role as a central defender.

== Coaching and post-retirement ==
McPherson moved into coaching in 2001, when appointed assistant-manager to Peter Cormack at Morton. When Cormack left Cappielow in March 2002, McPherson was promoted to player-manager, although he could not prevent the club's relegation from the third tier. He was sacked after only 13 games of the new season, despite the club being three points from the top of the league.

McPherson has since developed a career in sports management. He continues to follow the fortunes of his former teams closely and often comments on them in the media. He was inducted into the Rangers Hall of Fame in 2014.

On 20 May 2018 McPherson was inducted into the Heart of Midlothian F.C. Hall of Fame, along with his team-mates from the 1998 Scottish Cup winning team, at a celebratory dinner held twenty years later.

== Career statistics ==
=== International ===
Scotland national team
Year	Apps	Goals
1989	3	0
1990	6	0
1991	6	0
1992	10	0
1993	2	0
Total	27	0

== Honours ==
Rangers

- Scottish Premier Division: 1986–87, 1992–93, 1993–94
- Scottish Cup: 1992–93
  - Runner-up: 1982–83, 1993–94
- Scottish League Cup: 1983–84, 1984–85, 1992–93, 1993–94

Hearts

- Scottish Cup: 1997–98
  - Runner-up: 1995–96

== See also ==
- List of footballers in Scotland by number of league appearances (500+)
