= John Colquhoun (footballer) =

Scottish footballer

Personal information
- Full name: John Mark Colquhoun
- Date of birth: 14 July 1963 (age 63)
- Place of birth: Stirling, Scotland
- Positions: Striker; winger

Senior career*
Years	Team	Apps	(Gls)
1980–1983	Stirling Albion	104	(45)
1983–1985	Celtic	29	(3)
1985–1991	Heart of Midlothian	231	(54)
1991–1992	Millwall	27	(3)
1992–1993	Sunderland	20	(0)
1993–1997	Heart of Midlothian	114	(12)
1997	St Johnstone	6	(1)
Total		531	(118)

International career
1988	Scotland	2	(0)
- * Club domestic league appearances and goals

John Mark Colquhoun (born 14 July 1963) is a Scottish former professional footballer who played for Stirling Albion, Celtic, Hearts, Sunderland, Millwall and St Johnstone.

== Playing history ==
A slightly built but very pacy striker, Colquhoun was a popular and prolific goalscorer for his hometown club Stirling Albion. He was signed by Celtic in 1983. He moved to Edinburgh club Hearts in 1985. Colquhoun helped the club achieve its best performances in many years, only losing the 1985–86 Scottish Premier Division on goal difference thanks to a last day defeat at Dundee. He earned 2 international caps for Scotland, against Saudi Arabia and Malta, in 1988.

Colquhoun played for Millwall and Sunderland in the early 1990s. He returned to Hearts in 1993. He scored the Hearts goal in the 1996 Scottish Cup Final, a 5–1 defeat by Rangers. Colquhoun spent a month with Scottish First Division side St Johnstone in 1997 and helped them win promotion. He retired at the end of the 1996–97 season, having played in over 450 league games and scored well over 100 league goals.

== After playing football ==
Colquhoun was active in the players' union in Scotland during his playing career. After retiring from football, he was elected rector of the University of Edinburgh and served as a member of sportscotland, the sports funding body for Scotland. He is now a football agent. He was also a regular guest on STV's Scotsport.

Academic offices
Preceded by Malcolm Macleod	Rector of the University of Edinburgh; 1997–2000	Succeeded by Robin Harper
