= Wayne Foster =

English footballer (born 1963)

Personal information
- Full name: Wayne Paul Foster
- Date of birth: 11 September 1963 (age 63)
- Place of birth: Tyldesley, Lancashire, England
- Position: Striker

Senior career*
| Years | Team | Apps | (Gls) |
| 1981–1985 | Bolton Wanderers | 105 | (13) |
| 1985–1986 | Preston North End | 31 | (3) |
| 1986–1994 | Heart of Midlothian | 160 | (12) |
| 1994 | → Hartlepool United (loan) | 4 | (1) |
| 1994–1996 | Partick Thistle | 35 | (8) |
| 1996 | Falkirk | 1 | (1) |
| 1996–1997 | St Mirren | 2 | (2) |
| 1997–1998 | Livingston | 14 | (2) |
- * Club domestic league appearances and goals

Wayne Paul Foster (born 11 September 1963) is an English former professional footballer who played as a striker in England and Scotland during the 1980s and 1990s.

== Career ==
An English youth internationalist, Foster started his career at Bolton Wanderers, signing his first professional contract in August 1981. However, after over 100 appearances for the Wanderers he left for Preston North End in 1985 after losing his place at Burnden Park. He lasted less than a year at Deepdale before Alex MacDonald signed him for Heart of Midlothian on a free transfer.

Foster spent seven seasons at Tynecastle. He was initially regarded to as a first team regular in his first two seasons but in a total of 65 starts he only amassed 14 goals. He was used sparingly in later seasons as he still struggled to get the goals, failing to score a single goal from 17 appearances in the 1992–93 season.

Whilst never regarded as anything more than a squad player, one game in February 1994 put Foster into Heart of Midlothian folklore. Hearts had gone on a run of games undefeated against arch-rivals Hibernian which had stretched to 20 games before the sides were drawn together in the 4th Round of the Scottish Cup at Hibs' ground, Easter Road. With Hearts the away side and struggling in the league under Sandy Clark, Hibs were considered favourites for the tie; however it was Hearts who opened the scoring inside the first three minutes. Hibs equalised before half time and came close to taking the lead. Hearts replaced the tiring John Robertson with Foster. With just four minutes remaining, Gary Mackay played a long ball over the top of the Hibs defence for Foster to run on for. Using his pace, he controlled the ball and fired the ball through the legs of advancing Hibs goalkeeper Jim Leighton and into the net, right in front of the jubilant Hearts support.

== References in popular culture ==
Foster has the distinction of having a short story named after him in Irvine Welsh's 1994 collection The Acid House.

== Personal life ==
Wayne attended Sacred Heart Primary School in Tyldesley, Greater Manchester. In the Atherton Primary Schools Cup Final Programme, aged 11 years 8 months, he recorded his favourite team as Leeds and his favourite player as Allan Clarke. Foster has a pet Goldfish called Graham! Edinburgh,
