= Neil Berry (footballer) =

Scottish footballer

Personal information
- Full name: Neil Berry
- Date of birth: 6 April 1963 (age 63)
- Place of birth: Edinburgh, Scotland
- Height: 1.80 m (5 ft 11 in)
- Position: Midfielder

Senior career*
Years	Team	Apps	(Gls)
1981–1984	Bolton Wanderers	32	(0)
1984–1996	Heart of Midlothian	368	(15)
1996–1998	Falkirk	19	(0)
1998–1998	Hamilton	15	(1)
1999–2000	Cowdenbeath	3	(0)
Total		437	(16)
- * Club domestic league appearances and goals

Neil Berry (born 6 April 1963) is a Scottish former footballer, who played the majority of his career with Heart of Midlothian.

He was known for his tough-tackling, no nonsense style of play. He was a regular in the Hearts team throughout much of the 1980s and early 1990s, and was a member of the 1985–86 team that lost the league title on the last game of the season to Celtic, and the 1986 Scottish Cup Final to Aberdeen.

Although he was chiefly a midfielder, he could also play in defence and was often drafted into the rearguard alongside the likes of Craig Levein.
