= Gary Mackay =

Scottish footballer and manager

Personal information
- Date of birth: 23 January 1964 (age 62)
- Place of birth: Edinburgh, Scotland
- Position: Midfielder

Senior career*
Years	Team	Apps	(Gls)
1980–1997	Heart of Midlothian	516	(45)
1997–1999	Airdrieonians	44	(1)
Total		560	(46)

International career
1987–1988	Scotland	4	(1)
1990	SFA (SFL centenary)	1	(0)

Managerial career
- 1999–2000: Airdrieonians
Medal record
Scotland
UEFA European U-18 Championship
Winner	1982 Finland	Team competition
- * Club domestic league appearances and goals

Gary Mackay (born 23 January 1964) is a Scottish former footballer, who made over 500 league appearances for Heart of Midlothian and also played for Airdrieonians and the Scotland national team. After retiring as a player, he managed Airdrie for a year. Mackay is now an SFA–registered agent.

== Career ==
Mackay played for Heart of Midlothian for most of his career, and he holds the record for the most competitive appearances for the club, with 640. Mackay won international recognition in the late 1980s, winning four caps for Scotland. His most significant act as a Scotland player was to score the winning goal on his debut in a UEFA Euro 1988 qualifying match against Bulgaria in Sofia. Although this goal did not substantially benefit Scotland, who had already been eliminated, it was of great significance to Ireland, who qualified for the finals as a result of this strike.

Kevin Harper alleged that he had been racially abused by Mackay during a match in November 1996. The Scottish Football Association failed to investigate the incident. Mackay has since been involved in work for 'Show Racism the Red Card' which primarily aims to prevent racism in football.

Mackay left Hearts in 1997 to play for Airdrie. After retiring as a player in 1999, Mackay then managed Airdrie for a season, but the club suffered severe financial problems and he was sacked to make way for Steve Archibald during July 2000.

Mackay has since worked as an agent, representing players including Garry O'Connor, Christophe Berra and Lee Wallace. Mackay was criticised by his former club Hearts in June 2011 on the official Hearts website. "Over a short space of time 4 players at our club have been on the wrong end of the law. We note that 3 of them are represented by the same agent – Gary Mackay – who has been so vicious in his attacks against Mr Romanov".

== See also ==
- List of footballers in Scotland by number of league appearances (500+)
