= John Robertson (footballer, born 1964) =

Scottish football coach (born 1964)

Personal information
- Full name: John Grant Robertson
- Date of birth: 2 October 1964 (age 62)
- Place of birth: Edinburgh, Scotland
- Position: Striker

Team information
- Current team: Ross County (coach)

Youth career
- Salvesen Boys Club
- Edina Hibs

Senior career*
Years	Team	Apps	(Gls)
1981–1988	Heart of Midlothian	203	(106)
1988	Newcastle United	12	(0)
1988–1998	Heart of Midlothian	310	(108)
1998	→ Dundee (loan)	4	(1)
1998–2000	Livingston	41	(14)
Total		570	(229)

International career
1984–1987	Scotland U21	6	(0)
1990–1996	Scotland B	3	(0)
1990	SFA (SFL centenary)	1	(0)
1990–1995	Scotland	16	(3)

Managerial career
- 2002–2004: Inverness Caledonian Thistle
- 2004–2005: Heart of Midlothian
- 2005: Ross County
- 2006–2007: Livingston
- 2007: Derry City
- 2010–2012: East Fife
- 2017–2021: Inverness Caledonian Thistle
- 2023: Inverness Caledonian Thistle (interim)
- 2025: Ross County (interim)
- 2025: Ross County (interim)
- * Club domestic league appearances and goals

John Grant Robertson (born 2 October 1964) is a Scottish professional football coach and former player. Robertson played as a striker for Newcastle United, Dundee and Livingston, but he is best known for his two spells at Heart of Midlothian totalling about 18 years, where he is the club's all-time leading goalscorer. He has since managed Inverness Caledonian Thistle, Hearts, Ross County, Livingston, Derry City and East Fife.

== Playing career ==
Hibernian attempted to sign Robertson as a teenager but he asked for time to think the deal over; after Hibs refused, he signed for Heart of Midlothian along with school friend and fellow future internationalist Dave Bowman. Robertson eventually earned the moniker "The Hammer of Hibs" (in addition to his more standard nickname "Robbo") as he scored a record 27 goals in Edinburgh derby matches. In 1986, 20 league goals from Robertson helped Hearts to the brink of a league and cup double. A 27 league game unbeaten run ended with two Albert Kidd goals for Dundee in the last six minutes of the season allowing Celtic to overtake them to win the title. A week later, Hearts lost 3–0 to Aberdeen in the cup final. He scored 106 goals in 202 Hearts league games in this spell at Tynecastle Park.

He left Hearts to play for Newcastle United in April 1988. Robertson failed to score in 14 Newcastle competitive first team games and returned to Hearts in December of that year, and remained there for the next decade. In 1998 Hearts won the Scottish Cup with Robertson an unused substitute, earning him his only senior medal as a player. In this second spell at Hearts he scored at a much less prolific rate compared to his first spell, with this time 106 goals in 310 league games. After an earlier loan spell with Dundee scoring once in 4 league games, he left Tynecastle that summer. He joined Livingston as a player-coach, scoring 14 goals in 41 league games.

Robertson was also a Scottish international, playing on 16 occasions for Scotland. He made his debut against Romania in 1990, scoring in a 2–1 win. He missed out on selection for the UEFA Euro 1992 due to a hernia injury.

== Coaching career ==
=== Inverness Caledonian Thistle (first spell) ===
Whilst playing for Livingston, Robertson became involved in the coaching side of the game. He left the club in season 2002–03 to become manager of Inverness Caledonian Thistle where he guided the Highland team to the SPL for the first time in their history.

=== Heart of Midlothian manager ===
In November 2004 he returned to Hearts as head coach and despite two cup semi-finals and a good season in Europe as well as finishing fifth in the league, he was sacked in May 2005.

=== Ross County and Livingston ===
Robertson was appointed manager of Scottish First Division team Ross County in June 2005, but left by mutual consent after four months. He was then appointed manager of Livingston in February 2006, but was sacked in April 2007 after finishing sixth in the First Division.

=== Derry City ===
Robertson was appointed by League of Ireland side Derry City in July 2007. He took club out of the relegation battle to a safe mid table position and also won the FAI League Cup and qualified for the Setanta Cup before being dismissed by the new chairman and board of directors at Derry, and replaced by former Derry boss Stephen Kenny. In 2009, Robertson coached strikers at Scottish Premier League clubs Dundee United and Kilmarnock. In March 2010, Robertson helped coach the strikers at Hearts on a non-contract basis.

=== East Fife ===
Robertson was appointed manager of East Fife in October 2010. In September 2011, his East Fife side knocked SPL club Aberdeen out of the Scottish League Cup at Pittodrie Stadium. On 1 March 2012 it was announced that Robertson had left East Fife.

=== Inverness Caledonian Thistle (second spell) ===
In June 2017, Robertson returned to Inverness Caledonian Thistle as manager. On 24 March 2018, the club won the Scottish Challenge Cup. In the 2018/19 season, Inverness qualified for the promotion playoffs but were beaten in the semi-finals by Dundee United. Dundee then made an approach for Robertson, but this was rejected by Inverness. Inverness finished second in the 2019–20 Scottish Championship, which was curtailed due to the COVID-19 pandemic.

In June 2020, his contract with Inverness was extended by two years. Robertson was placed on compassionate leave in February 2021, with Neil McCann given caretaker charge of the team in his absence. Robertson returned to Inverness in May 2021 as sporting director, with a new manager to be appointed (Billy Dodds). Dodds was sacked in September 2023, and Robertson was placed in caretaker charge of the Inverness first team until Duncan Ferguson was appointed later that month. He left the club in November that same year.

=== Ross County return ===
In June 2025, Robertson returned to Dingwall to join Don Cowie's coaching staff. He was made interim manager in August 2025, after Cowie left the club.Robertson was once again made intirim manager on 17 December 2025 after the departure of Tony Docherty, he then returned to the role of first team coach after the appointment of Stuart Kettlewell. It was announced on 4 May 2026 that Robertson would leave the club following County's relegation to Scottish League One.

== Career statistics ==
=== Club ===
Appearances and goals by club, season and competition
Club	Season	League			National cup (Note: Includes Scottish Cup, FA Cup.)		League cup (Note: Includes Scottish League Cup, Football League Cup.)		Europe		Total	
Club	Season	Division	Apps	Goals	Apps	Goals	Apps	Goals	Apps	Goals	Apps	Goals
Heart of Midlothian	1981–82	First Division	1	0	0	0	0	0	–		1	0
Heart of Midlothian	1982–83	First Division	23	21	3	0	2	0	–		28	21
Heart of Midlothian	1983–84	Premier Division	35	15	2	1	7	4	–		44	20
Heart of Midlothian	1984–85	Premier Division	33	8	5	2	5	1	2	2	45	13
Heart of Midlothian	1985–86	Premier Division	35	20	5	4	3	1	–		43	25
Heart of Midlothian	1986–87	Premier Division	37	16	6	2	1	0	2	1	46	19
Heart of Midlothian	1987–88	Premier Division	39	26	4	2	3	3	–		46	31
Heart of Midlothian	Total		203	106	25	11	21	9	4	3	253	129
Newcastle United	1988–89	First Division	12	0	–		2	0	–		14	0
Heart of Midlothian	1988–89	Premier Division	15	4	3	0	0	0	1	0	19	4
Heart of Midlothian	1989–90	Premier Division	32	17	3	4	1	1	0	0	36	22
Heart of Midlothian	1990–91	Premier Division	31	12	1	0	3	1	3	3	38	16
Heart of Midlothian	1991–92	Premier Division	42	14	6	4	3	2	0	0	51	20
Heart of Midlothian	1992–93	Premier Division	42	11	4	3	3	1	4	0	53	15
Heart of Midlothian	1993–94	Premier Division	36	8	3	1	2	2	2	1	43	12
Heart of Midlothian	1994–95	Premier Division	31	10	5	3	2	1	0	0	38	14
Heart of Midlothian	1995–96	Premier Division	33	12	5	1	2	1	0	0	40	14
Heart of Midlothian	1996–97	Premier Division	27	14	3	2	5	3	1	0	36	19
Heart of Midlothian	1997–98	Premier Division	21	6	2	0	2	0	0	0	25	6
Heart of Midlothian	Total		310	108	35	18	23	12	11	4	379	142
Dundee	1997–98	First Division	4	1	0	0	0	0	–		4	1
Livingston	1998–99	Second Division	36	13	5	2	3	1	–		44	16
Livingston	1999–00	First Division	5	1	1	0	0	0	–		6	1
Livingston	Total		41	14	6	2	3	1	0	0	50	17
Career total			570	229	66	31	49	22	15	7	700	289

=== International ===
Appearances and goals by national team and year
National team	Year	Apps	Goals
Scotland	1990	2	2
Scotland	1991	3	0
Scotland	1992	3	0
Scotland	1993	3	0
Scotland	1995	5	1
Total		16	3

Scores and results list Scotland's goal tally first, score column indicates score after each Robertson goal.

List of international goals scored by John Robertson
No.	Date	Venue	Opponent	Score	Result	Competition
1	12 September 1990	Hampden Park, Glasgow, Scotland	Romania	1–1	2–1	UEFA Euro 1992 qualifying
2	17 October 1990	Hampden Park, Glasgow, Scotland	Switzerland	1–0	2–1	UEFA Euro 1992 qualifying
3	24 May 1995	Toyama Park Stadium, Toyama, Japan	Ecuador	1–0	2–1	Kirin Cup

== Managerial record ==
As of match played 27 December 2025

Managerial record by team and tenure
Team	From	To	Record				
Team	From	To	G	W	D	L	Win %
Inverness Caledonian Thistle	26 December 2002	3 November 2004	84	44	13	27	52.38
Heart of Midlothian	3 November 2004	9 May 2005	35	13	9	13	37.14
Ross County	21 June 2005	24 October 2005	15	6	5	4	40.00
Livingston	15 February 2006	15 April 2007	51	15	10	26	29.41
Derry City	2 July 2007	11 December 2007	24	8	8	8	33.33
East Fife	26 October 2010	1 March 2012	62	28	11	23	45.16
Inverness Caledonian Thistle	14 June 2017	13 May 2021	155	70	42	43	45.16
Inverness Caledonian Thistle (interim)	17 September 2023	26 September 2023	1	0	0	1	0.00
Ross County (interim)	25 August 2025	3 September 2025	1	0	1	0	0.00
Ross County (interim)	17 December 2025	30 December 2025	2	0	1	1	0.00
Career total			430	184	100	146	42.79

== Honours ==
=== Player ===
Heart of Midlothian

- Scottish Premier Division runner–up: 1985–86, 1987–88, 1991–92
- Scottish First Division promoted: 1982–83
- Scottish Cup: 1997–98; runner–up 1985–86, 1995–96
- Scottish League Cup runner–up: 1996–97
- Tennents' Sixes: 1985, 1991; runner–up 1987

Livingston

- Scottish Second Division: 1998–99

Scotland U16

- Victory Shield: 1979–80
- Dentyne Trophy: 1980

Individual

- SPFA Young Player of the Year: 1983–84
- Scottish Premier Division Top Scorer: 1989–90
- Heart of Midlothian Hall of Fame inductee: 2006
- Scottish Football Hall of Fame inductee: 2019

=== Manager ===
Livingston Reserves

- SFL Reserve West: 2000–01
- SFL Reserve Cup: 1998–99, 2000–01

Inverness Caledonian Thistle

- Scottish First Division: 2003–04; runner–up 2019–20
- Scottish Challenge Cup: 2003–04, 2017–18, 2019–20 (Note: ICT and Raith Rovers were declared joint-winners on 30 April 2021. The final was originally withheld due to the COVID-19 pandemic. Robertson was the manager when the team reached the final and was still the permanent manager at the time of announcement, albeit Robertson was on compassionate leave at the time.)

Derry City

- League of Ireland Cup: 2007

Individual

- SFL First Division Manager of the Year: 2003–04
- SFL Second Division Manager of Month: November 2010, October 2011
- SPFL Championship Manager of Month: October 2017, March 2019

== See also ==
- List of footballers in Scotland by number of league appearances (500+)
- List of footballers in Scotland by number of league goals (200+)
