= John Collins (footballer, born 1968) =

Scottish footballer and manager

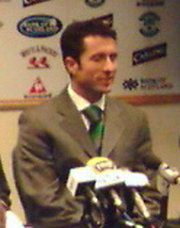
- Collins as manager of Hibernian in 2006

Personal information
- Full name: John Angus Paul Collins
- Date of birth: 31 January 1968 (age 58)
- Place of birth: Galashiels, Scotland
- Height: 5 ft 8 in (1.73 m)
- Position: Midfielder

Youth career
- 1980–1984: Hutchison Vale
- 1984–1985: Hibernian

Senior career*
Years	Team	Apps	(Gls)
1985–1990	Hibernian	163	(15)
1990–1996	Celtic	221	(47)
1996–1998	Monaco	53	(7)
1998–2000	Everton	53	(3)
2000–2003	Fulham	65	(3)
Total		555	(75)

International career
1987–1989	Scotland U21	8	(0)
1988–1999	Scotland	58	(12)
1990	SFA (SFL centenary)	1	(0)

Managerial career
- 2006–2007: Hibernian
- 2008–2009: Charleroi
- 2012–2013: Livingston (director of football)
- 2014–2016: Celtic (assistant)
- * Club domestic league appearances and goals

John Angus Paul Collins (born 31 January 1968) is a Scottish professional football manager and former player who played as a midfielder.

He played for Hibernian, Celtic, AS Monaco, Everton and Fulham in a 19-year career. Collins also represented Scotland 58 times, scoring in the opening match of the 1998 FIFA World Cup against Brazil.

He started his coaching career as manager of Hibernian, winning the 2007 Scottish League Cup Final, but resigned later that year. He then had a brief spell as manager of Charleroi in 2009. Collins was appointed director of football at Livingston in February 2012, but resigned a year later. He then assisted Ronny Deila at Celtic for two years. Collins has also worked in media coverage of football.

== Playing career ==
=== Hibernian ===
As a youngster, Collins played both rugby union and football before turning his attention entirely to football. At youth level, he played for Hutchison Vale between 1980 and 1984, captaining the side for four years, before signing as a professional with Hibernian. Collins played with the Hibees for six seasons, making his debut in 1985 aged 17, appearing 195 times and scoring 21 goals. During his spell at Easter Road, he was named the PFA Scotland Young Player of the Year for 1988.

=== Celtic ===
Collins signed for Celtic in 1990, becoming their first million pound player. He generally played on the left side of midfield, scoring 55 goals in 273 appearances. In April 1994, he became the first professional footballer using Adidas Predator boots to score a goal in a top-level match: he scored the opening goal of a 1–1 draw at Ibrox against Rangers, direct from a free-kick on the edge of the penalty box. He repeated that feat from almost the same position in the next Old Firm meeting at the same venue in August of the same year. During his time at Celtic he won only one trophy; the Scottish Cup in 1995.

=== Monaco ===
Collins moved to AS Monaco in the summer of 1996 on a free transfer under the Bosman ruling; Under the direction of Fergus McCann, Celtic attempted to obtain compensation for the loss of Collins, arguing that the Bosman ruling did not apply to this case because AS Monaco were based in the principality of Monaco and outside of European Union jurisdiction. The compensation claim was not successful.

Collins won the French championship in 1997 with Monaco, who then reached the semi-final of the 1997–98 UEFA Champions League, defeating Manchester United in the quarter-final before losing to Juventus.

=== Later career ===
Collins moved to Everton in the summer of 1998 for £2 million. He captained Everton before submitting a transfer request in 2000. He then joined Fulham, where he linked up with Jean Tigana, who had been his manager at Monaco. Collins helped Fulham gain promotion to the Premier League in 2001. He retired in 2003, having not played regularly during the 2002–03 season. Coventry City offered to sign Collins on loan, but this offer was refused by Fulham because it did not cover his wages fully.

In February 2014, Collins registered as a player with Gala Fairydean Rovers, a club who he had been ambassador for.

=== International ===
Collins won 58 caps and scored 12 goals for Scotland. He played for his country at Euro 1996 and the 1998 World Cup. He scored a goal in the opening match of that World Cup, with a penalty kick against Brazil. He retired from international football after the aggregate defeat in the UEFA Euro 2000 qualifying play-offs by England in November 1999.

== Coaching career ==
After retiring from club football in 2003, Collins spent time in Monaco with his family, while also obtaining coaching qualifications including the UEFA Pro Licence.

On 31 October 2006, Collins was appointed as manager of Hibernian. Collins led Hibernian to their first national trophy in over 15 years, when they defeated Kilmarnock 5–1 in the 2007 Scottish League Cup Final. Despite the League Cup victory, Collins had a major dispute with his players just weeks later. A delegation of players met chairman Rod Petrie, where they complained about his training methods and match tactics. The players soon backed down and captain Rob Jones offered a public apology to Collins on their behalf.

On 20 December 2007, Collins resigned from Hibernian with immediate effect, citing a disagreement with the Hibs board about the budget to bring in new players. His decision was taken just one day after the club opened new training facilities. Collins had also said in October 2007 that he had "no intention" of breaking his contract with Hibs, after turning down a possibility of becoming Queens Park Rangers manager.

Lawrie Sanchez was sacked by Fulham the next day, which led to reports that Collins might move there. Collins distanced himself from this speculation, and Roy Hodgson was appointed by Fulham a week later. Collins was interviewed by West Ham United in September 2008.

On 15 December 2008, Collins was appointed as the manager of Belgian club Charleroi. Collins was reunited with former Hibs striker Abdessalam Benjelloun, but Benjelloun was almost immediately returned to Hibs before being loaned to another Belgian club, Roeselare. Collins announced his departure from Charleroi after the club secured their First Division status near the end of the season.

Collins was appointed director of football by Livingston in February 2012. He agreed to play for his old amateur club Gala Rovers in a friendly against a Livingston XI on 25 July 2012. He left the club on 28 February 2013, after Collins disagreed with a decision to remove Gareth Evans from first team coaching.

In June 2014, Collins was appointed to the position of assistant manager at Celtic. He left the club at the end of the 2015–16 season, at the same time as Ronny Deila.

== Media work ==
Collins has appeared on the Sky Sports coverage of the UEFA Champions League and Sportscene's coverage of Scotland games. He worked for CBC Sports during their coverage of the 2010 FIFA World Cup.

== Career statistics ==
=== International ===
Appearances and goals by national team and year
National team	Year	Apps	Goals
Scotland	1988	1	1
Scotland	1990	4	0
Scotland	1991	1	1
Scotland	1992	3	0
Scotland	1993	6	2
Scotland	1994	7	3
Scotland	1995	7	1
Scotland	1996	10	1
Scotland	1997	7	0
Scotland	1998	7	2
Scotland	1999	5	1
Total		58	12

Scores and results list Scotland's goal tally first, score column indicates score after each Collins goal.

List of international goals scored by John Collins
No.	Date	Venue	Opponent	Score	Result	Competition
1	17 February 1988	Prince Faisal bin Fahd Stadium, Riyadh	Saudi Arabia	2–1	2–2	Friendly
2	27 March 1991	Hampden Park, Glasgow	Bulgaria	1–0	1–1	Euro 1992 qualifier
3	19 May 1993	Kadrioru Stadium, Tallinn	Estonia	2–0	3–0	1994 World Cup qualifier
4	8 September 1993	Pittodrie Stadium, Aberdeen	Switzerland	1–0	1–1	1994 World Cup qualifier
5	7 September 1994	Olympiastadion, Helsinki	Finland	2–0	2–0	Euro 1996 qualifier
6	12 October 1994	Hampden Park, Glasgow	Faroe Islands	3–0	5–1	Euro 1996 qualifier
7	12 October 1994	Hampden Park, Glasgow	Faroe Islands	5–0	5–1	Euro 1996 qualifier
8	26 April 1995	Stadio Olimpico, Serravalle	San Marino	1–0	2–0	Euro 1996 qualifier
9	5 October 1996	Stadionas Daugava, Riga	Latvia	1–0	2–0	1998 World Cup qualifier
10	23 May 1998	Giants Stadium, East Rutherford, New Jersey	Colombia	1–1	2–2	Friendly
11	10 June 1998	Stade de France, Saint-Denis	Brazil	1–1	1–2	1998 World Cup
12	5 October 1999	Ibrox Stadium, Glasgow	Bosnia and Herzegovina	1–0	1–0	Euro 2000 qualifier

=== Managerial record ===
Team	From	To	Record				
Team	From	To	G	W	D	L	Win %
(Scotland) Hibernian	31 October 2006	20 December 2007	54	23	15	16	42.59
(Belgium) Charleroi	15 December 2008	15 May 2009	18	7	4	7	38.89
Career total			72	30	19	23	41.67

== Honours ==
=== Player ===
Hibernian

- Tennents' Sixes: 1990

Celtic

- Scottish Cup: 1994–95
- Tennents' Sixes: 1992

Monaco

- French Division 1: 1996–97

Fulham

- Football League First Division: 2000–01
- UEFA Intertoto Cup: 2002

Individual

- Scotland national football team roll of honour: 1998
- SPFA Team of the Year: 1994

=== Manager ===
Hibernian

- Scottish League Cup: 2006–07
