= 1990 Tennent's Sixes =

1989–90 Tennent's Sixes
Tournament details
- Country: Scotland
- Venue(s): Scottish Exhibition and Conference Centre, Glasgow
- Dates: 28 and 29 January 1988
- Teams: 10

Final positions
- Champions: Hibernian
- Runners-up: St Mirren

Tournament statistics
- Matches played: 23
- Goals scored: 77 (3.35 per match)
- Top goal scorer: Paul Kane (8)

The 1990 Tennents' Sixes was the seventh staging of the indoor 6-a-side football tournament. For the fifth time it was held at the Scottish Exhibition and Conference Centre (SECC) in Glasgow on 28 and 29 January with a first prize of £16,000.

All clubs in the 1989–90 Premier Division season competed and the two group winners and runners-up qualified to the semi-finals. Both semi-final ties were decided on penalties and Hibernian beat St Mirren 2–0 in the final to win their first Sixes title.

== Group 1 ==
| Team | Pld | W | L | GF | GA | GD | Pts |
|---|---|---|---|---|---|---|---|
| Hibernian | 4 | 4 | 0 | 9 | 1 | 8 | 8 |
| St Mirren | 4 | 3 | 1 | 9 | 7 | 2 | 6 |
| Rangers | 4 | 2 | 2 | 4 | 7 | -3 | 4 |
| Dundee | 4 | 1 | 3 | 3 | 5 | -2 | 2 |
| Dundee United | 4 | 0 | 4 | 7 | 13 | -6 | 0 |

| Home team | Score | Away team | Date |
|---|---|---|---|
| Rangers | 0–0 | Dundee | 28 January 1990 |
| St Mirren | 3–3 | Dundee United | 28 January 1990 |
| Hibernian | 0–0 | Rangers | 28 January 1990 |
| St Mirren | 1–0 | Dundee | 28 January 1990 |
| Hibernian | 5–1 | Dundee United | 28 January 1990 |
| St Mirren | 5–2 | Rangers | 28 January 1990 |
| Dundee | 3–1 | Dundee United | 28 January 1990 |
| Hibernian | 2–0 | St Mirren | 28 January 1990 |
| Hibernian | 2–0 | Dundee | 29 January 1990 |
| Rangers | 2–2 | Dundee United | 29 January 1990 |

== Group 2 ==
| Team | Pld | W | L | GF | GA | GD | Pts |
|---|---|---|---|---|---|---|---|
| Motherwell | 4 | 3 | 1 | 5 | 4 | 1 | 6 |
| Heart of Midlothian | 4 | 2 | 2 | 15 | 5 | 10 | 4 |
| Aberdeen | 4 | 2 | 2 | 11 | 8 | 3 | 4 |
| Celtic | 4 | 2 | 2 | 7 | 10 | -3 | 4 |
| Dunfermline Athletic | 4 | 1 | 3 | 4 | 15 | -11 | 2 |

| Home team | Score | Away team | Date |
|---|---|---|---|
| Aberdeen | 4–2 | Heart of Midlothian | 28 January 1990 |
| Motherwell | 3–0 | Dunfermline Athletic | 28 January 1990 |
| Heart of Midlothian | 5–0 | Celtic | 28 January 1990 |
| Dunfermline Athletic | 3–2 | Aberdeen | 28 January 1990 |
| Motherwell | 1–1 | Heart of Midlothian | 28 January 1990 |
| Celtic | 3–3 | Aberdeen | 28 January 1990 |
| Heart of Midlothian | 7–0 | Dunfermline Athletic | 28 January 1990 |
| Motherwell | 1–1 | Celtic | 28 January 1990 |
| Celtic | 3–1 | Dunfermline Athletic | 29 January 1990 |
| Aberdeen | 2–0 | Motherwell | 29 January 1990 |

== Semi-finals ==
29 January 1990
20:40

| Hibernian | 1 – 1 | Heart of Midlothian |

Scottish Exhibition and Conference Centre, Glasgow

29 January 1990
21:05

| St Mirren | 1 – 1 | Motherwell |

Scottish Exhibition and Conference Centre, Glasgow

== Final ==
Hibs beat St Mirren to win the tournament for the only time.

29 January 1990
21:55

| Hibernian | 2 - 0 | St Mirren |
|---|---|---|
| Kane; Collins |

Scottish Exhibition and Conference Centre, Glasgow
Attendance: 7500

== Prize money ==
A breakdown of the prize money from the tournament sponsors.

| Prize money | Amount |
|---|---|
| Tournament participation | £12,000 |
| Losing semi-finalists | £1,000 |
| Losing finalists | £2,000 |
| Tournament winners | £4,000 |
| Highest scoring team | £2,000 |

== Incidents and events ==
- John Robertson of Hearts' goal against Dunfermline was the 600th goal scored in the tournament's history.
- Hearts 7 goal to 0 victory was the equal largest margin of victory in the competition's history.
- Peterhead (Highland League Cup holders) played Norton House (Scottish Amateur Cup holders) in specially arranged challenge match before the final.
- Rangers breached tournament rules again by fielding a weakened team. The rules declared all teams must include first team players, but Rangers only selected a total of four.
