= 1992–93 Partick Thistle F.C. season =

Partick Thistle
1992–93 season
- Manager: John Lambie
- Stadium: Firhill Stadium
- Scottish Premier Division: 8th
- Scottish Cup: Third round
- Scottish League Cup: Third round
- Highest home attendance: 18,752 vs Rangers, Premier Division, 12 September 1992
- Lowest home attendance: 2,514 vs Dundee, Premier Division, 27 January 1993
- Average home league attendance: 5,942

During the 1992–93 season, Partick Thistle competed in the Scottish Premier Division, in which they finished 8th.

== Scottish Premier Division ==
=== League table ===
Pos	Team	Pld	W	D	L	GF	GA	GD	Pts
6	St Johnstone	44	10	20	14	52	66	−14	40
7	Hibernian	44	12	13	19	54	64	−10	37
8	Partick Thistle	44	12	12	20	50	71	−21	36
9	Motherwell	44	11	13	20	46	62	−16	35
10	Dundee	44	11	12	21	48	68	−20	34

Source: RSSSF
Rules for classification: 1) points; 2) goal difference; 3) number of goals scored.

=== Matches ===
Win	Draw	Loss

Scottish Premier Division results
Date	Opponent	Venue	Result F–A	Scorers	Attendance
1 August 1992	Airdrieonians	H	1–0	Irons	4,483
4 August 1992	Dundee United	H	0–1		5,128
8 August 1992	St Johnstone	A	1–1	McGlashan	4,401
15 August 1992	Heart of Midlothian	A	1–2	Britton (pen.)	7,911
22 August 1992	Motherwell	H	2–2	Cameron, Shaw	4,564
29 August 1992	Dundee	H	6–3	Shaw (4, 1 pen.), Paterson (o.g.), Britton	4,520
5 September 1992	Falkirk	A	1–0	Britton	5,691
12 September 1992	Rangers	H	1–4	Shaw	18,752
19 September 1992	Aberdeen	A	0–2		9,755
26 September 1992	Celtic	A	2–1	Shaw (2)	21,486
3 October 1992	Hibernian	H	2–2	Farningham (2)	6,332
10 October 1992	Airdrieonians	A	2–2	Shaw, Cameron	4,204
17 October 1992	St Johnstone	H	1–0	Farningham	4,211
24 October 1992	Dundee	A	2–0	Jamieson, Cameron	5,428
31 October 1992	Falkirk	H	1–2	Britton	5,535
7 November 1992	Motherwell	A	2–0	Jamieson, Craig	5,379
10 November 1992	Heart of Midlothian	H	1–1	Britton	5,355
24 November 1992	Aberdeen	H	0–7		3,986
28 November 1992	Rangers	A	0–3		40,939
1 December 1992	Dundee United	A	1–2	Britton	5,241
5 December 1992	Celtic	H	2–3	Farningham (2)	13,312
12 December 1992	Hibernian	A	0–1		6,077
19 December 1992	Airdrieonians	H	1–1	Johnston	3,274
26 December 1992	Heart of Midlothian	A	1–1	Britton	9,922
2 January 1993	Motherwell	H	0–1		6,467
27 January 1993	Dundee	H	2–0	Kinnaird, Britton	2,514
30 January 1993	St Johnstone	A	0–0		4,555
2 February 1993	Falkirk	A	2–4	Tierney, Shaw	4,690
13 February 1993	Dundee United	H	0–4		3,846
16 February 1993	Hibernian	H	0–3		3,064
20 February 1993	Celtic	A	0–0		15,561
2 March 1993	Aberdeen	A	0–1		8,287
9 March 1993	Airdrieonians	A	2–2	Cameron (pen.), Irons	3,080
13 March 1993	St Johnstone	H	1–1	Byrne (o.g.)	3,534
20 March 1993	Motherwell	A	3–2	Farningham, McGlashan, Jamieson	6,499
27 March 1993	Heart of Midlothian	H	1–1	Farningham	4,594
3 April 1993	Dundee	A	1–0	Cameron (pen.)	3,846
10 April 1993	Falkirk	H	0–1		4,677
17 April 1993	Rangers	A	1–3	Britton	42,636
20 April 1993	Aberdeen	H	1–3	Taylor	3,445
1 May 1993	Dundee United	A	1–3	Britton	5,590
4 May 1993	Rangers	H	3–0	Farningham, Tierney, Britton	9,303
8 May 1993	Celtic	H	0–1		9,834
15 May 1993	Hibernian	A	1–0	Britton	5,467

== Scottish Cup ==
Win	Draw	Loss

Scottish Cup results
Round	Date	Opponent	Venue	Result F–A	Scorers	Attendance
Third round	9 January 1993	Cowdenbeath	H	0–1		3,265

== Scottish League Cup ==
Win	Draw	Loss

Scottish League Cup results
Round	Date	Opponent	Venue	Result F–A	Scorers	Attendance
Second round	11 August 1992	Ayr United	H	2–0	Farningham, Kinnaird	2,600
Third round	19 August 1992	St Johnstone	H	2–2 (a.e.t.) (3–4 p)	Britton, Shaw	4,716
