= John Lambie (footballer, born 1941) =

Scottish footballer and manager

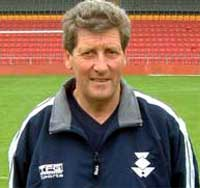
- Lambie as manager of Partick Thistle

Personal information
- Date of birth: 2 March 1941
- Place of birth: Whitburn, Scotland
- Date of death: 10 April 2018 (aged 77)
- Position: Full back

Youth career
- Whitburn

Senior career*
Years	Team	Apps	(Gls)
1958–1969	Falkirk	199	(16)
1969–1974	St Johnstone	103	(4)
Total		302	(20)

Managerial career
- Armadale Thistle
- 1984–1988: Hamilton Academical
- 1988–1989: Partick Thistle
- 1989–1990: Hamilton Academical
- 1990–1995: Partick Thistle
- 1995–1996: Falkirk
- 1999–2003: Partick Thistle
- 2004–2005: Partick Thistle
- * Club domestic league appearances and goals

John Lambie (2 March 1941 – 10 April 2018) was a Scottish football player and manager. Lambie made over 200 appearances for Falkirk and also had a successful time with St Johnstone.

After retiring as a player, Lambie had four spells as manager of Partick Thistle. In his third spell, he guided them to consecutive promotions and entry to the Scottish Premier League in 2002, while also leading them to the semi-finals of the Scottish Cup in the same year. He also had spells as manager of Hamilton Academical (twice, winning the First Division in 1986) and Falkirk.

Lambie was known for his eccentricity, cigar smoking and fondness for pigeons. An occasion when he instructed for a concussed player to be told he was Pelé and sent back onto the pitch is one of the most famous quotes in British football.

== Playing career ==
Born in Whitburn, Lambie played for his hometown junior team Whitburn before signing for Falkirk in 1958, where he turned professional and switched position from inside forward to full back. In August 1969 he joined St Johnstone, where he played in the October 1969 Scottish League Cup Final (1–0 loss to Celtic) and took part in the Perth-based club's first European campaign (reaching the third round of the 1971–72 UEFA Cup).

== Coaching career ==
After retiring as a player in 1974, Lambie joined the St Johnstone coaching staff, and later moved to Hibernian. He became assistant manager at Hamilton Academical to his former Hibs colleague Bertie Auld, and succeeded him as manager in 1984. He led the Accies to the First Division title in 1985–86 and won away at Rangers in the next season's Scottish Cup.

=== Partick Thistle ===
In 1988, Lambie was appointed manager for the first time at Partick Thistle, but a year later returned to Hamilton, before going back to Thistle in 1990. He led Thistle to promotion to the top flight in 1992. Lambie subsequently kept Thistle in the top flight for the following three seasons, and qualified for the 1995 UEFA Intertoto Cup, the first time The Jags had been in European competition since the 1970s. He left in 1995 for his former club Falkirk, but quit his post in March 1996. The Herald wrote in 2002 that "It is odd how, despite Lambie playing over 200 games for Falkirk, and scoring a decent haul of goals as a defender, he is only remembered for his disastrous managerial reign".

Lambie returned for a third spell at Partick in 1999, with the club now in the third tier. The club had only just managed to save its existence through the Save the Jags campaign. Lambie got them into the Scottish Premier League in 2002 via back-to-back promotions, by signing the likes of Stephen Craigan, Martin Hardie and Danny Lennon, as well as bringing on the youth players, such as Alan Archibald and Kenny Arthur. Also in 2002, he guided the club to the Scottish Cup semi-finals, where they lost 3–0 to Rangers at Hampden Park. The final stages of the season were chronicled in the BBC Scotland fly on the wall documentary Grasping the Thistle, known for Lambie's use of profanity.

In January 2003, Lambie announced that he would retire at the end of the season as he did not agree with new regulations in football; he had attempted to sign Nathan Lowndes and Steven Ferguson on loan from English clubs but was barred by FIFA as they had both recently played in Scotland for other teams. On 17 May 2003 he made his farewell in his last game at Firhill Stadium, a 1–0 loss to Dundee United, having already guaranteed survival in the SPL on a considerably lower budget than their competitors. He became a member of the club's board. In 2004, Lambie returned as manager for a fourth spell, this time as Caretaker, briefly around the end of 2004 and beginning of 2005, in a bid to help the team's struggles on the pitch under the new management foil of Derek Whyte and Gerry Britton, who were later dismissed from their roles, as Dick Campbell took over reign at Firhill.

Lambie is remembered for his reaction when Partick player Colin McGlashan suffered a concussion; he ordered his assistant Gerry Collins to "Tell him he's Pelé and get him back on". A book of football quotes titled Tell Him He's Pelé was released in 2010. He is also remembered for taming Chic Charnley, a player sent off 17 times in his career, whom he signed once for Hamilton and three times for Partick.

== Personal life and death ==
Lambie was known for his love of pigeon racing and cigars. He spoke of the importance of his Christian faith in his life. He was a member and activist for the Scottish National Party but said that he was not a suitable candidate to seek elected office.

He was awarded the position of Honorary Vice President of Partick Thistle F.C. in August 2006. He was inducted into the Halls of Fame at both Falkirk and Partick Thistle.

Lambie had three daughters with his wife Mamie, from whom he was separated at the time of his death at the age of 77 on 10 April 2018.

== Honours ==
=== Manager ===
Hamilton Academical

- Scottish Football League First Division: 1985–86, 1987–88

Partick Thistle

- Scottish Football League First Division: 1991–92, 2001–02,
- Scottish Football League Second Division: 2000–01
- Tennents' Sixes: 1993
