= 1998–99 Livingston F.C. season =

Livingston
1998–99 season
- Manager: Ray Stewart
- Stadium: Almondvale Stadium
- Scottish Second Division: Winners
- Scottish Cup: Fourth round
- League Cup: Third round
- Top goalscorer: League: John Robertson (13); All: John Robertson (16)
| Home colours | Away colours |

Season 1998–99 saw Livingston compete in the Scottish Second Division. They also competed in the League Cup and the Scottish Cup.

== Summary ==
Livingston won the Scottish Second Division and were promoted. They reached the 3rd round of the league cup and the 4th round of the Scottish Cup.

The Challenge Cup was cancelled for the 1998–99 season due to a lack of sponsorship.

== Results & fixtures ==
Win Draw Loss

=== Scottish Second Division ===
| 4 August 1998 1 | Livingston | 1–1 | Stirling Albion | Almondvale Stadium |
| | McCormick 1' | | Donald 5' |

| 15 August 1998 2 | Inverness Caledonian Thistle | 2–1 | Livingston | Caledonian Stadium |
| | Shearer 56'; Wilson 61' | | Millar 83' |

| 22 August 1998 3 | Livingston | 1–1 | Forfar Athletic | Almondvale Stadium |
| | Bingham 40 pen.' | | Brand 88' |

| 29 August 1998 4 | Queen of the South | 0–1 | Livingston | Palmerston Park |
| | | | Feroz (red card) 70'; Robertson 87' |

| 5 September 1998 5 | Livingston | 3–1 | East Fife | Almondvale Stadium |
| | Bingham 7', 82 pen.' Robertson 35' | | Moffat 21'; McCulloch (red card) 82' |

| 12 September 1998 6 | Livingston | 2–1 | Arbroath | Almondvale Stadium |
| | McPhee 21'; Sherry 38' | | Peters 89' |

| 19 September 1998 7 | Clyde | 1–1 | Livingston | Broadwood Stadium |
| | McCusker 39' | | Bingham 69 pen.' |

| 26 September 1998 8 | Alloa Athletic | 3–4 | Livingston | Recreation Park |
| | Simpson 3'; Irvine 49 pen.', 70' | | Deas 8'; Sherry 33', 88'; Robertson 55' |

| 3 October 1998 9 | Livingston | 1–0 | Partick Thistle | Almondvale Stadium |
| | Deas 13' |

| 10 October 1998 10 | Livingston | 2–1 | Inverness Caledonian Thistle | Almondvale Stadium |
| | Robertson 35'; McPhee 76' | | McLean 87' |

| 17 October 1998 11 | Stirling Albion | 1–3 | Livingston | Forthbank Stadium |
| | McCallum 90' | | Robertson 3'; Bingham 11'; McManus 42' |

| 24 October 1998 12 | Livingston | 2–0 | Queen of the South | Almondvale Stadium |
| | Bingham 20', 24' |

| 31 October 1998 13 | East Fife | 2–3 | Livingston | Bayview Stadium |
| | Brown 12'; McManus 61 o.g.' | | Robertson 9'; Bingham 9'; McCormack 83' |

| 7 November 1998 14 | Livingston | 2–0 | Clyde | Almondvale Stadium |
| | Deas 32'; Watson 39' | | McMillan (red card) 25' |

| 14 November 1998 15 | Arbroath | 2–2 | Livingston | Gayfield Park |
| | McGlashan 1'; Arbuckle 61' | | Deas 45'; Bingham 51' |

| 21 November 1998 16 | Livingston | 2–1 | Alloa Athletic | Almondvale Stadium |
| | Millar 44'; King 45' | | Irvine 72' |

| 28 November 1998 17 | Partick Thistle | 1–3 | Livingston | Firhill Stadium |
| | Dunn 77' | | Fleming 38'; Sherry 59'; Robertson 85' |

| 12 December 1998 18 | Forfar Athletic | 1–2 | Livingston | Station Park |
| | Craig 47' | | King 46'; Bingham 68' |

| 19 December 1998 19 | Livingston | 0–0 | Stirling Albion | Almondvale Stadium |

| 27 December 1998 20 | Queen of the South | 2–2 | Livingston | Palmerston Park |
| | Eadie 1 pen.' Mallan 87' | | Millar 46'; Bingham 72' |

| 16 January 1999 21 | Alloa Athletic | 1–3 | Livingston | Recreation Park |
| | Simpson 10' | | Robertson 17'; McPhee 74'; Feroz 78' |

| 20 January 1999 22 | Livingston | 1–0 | East Fife | Almondvale Stadium |
| | Millar 27' | | Coyle (red card) 53' |

| 30 January 1999 23 | Livingston | 1–1 | Partick Thistle | Almondvale Stadium |
| | McPhee 78' | | Dunn 1' |

| 6 February 1999 24 | Clyde | 0–3 | Livingston | Broadwood Stadium |
| | Murray (red card) 55' | | Robertson 43'; King 65'; McPhee 84' |

| 16 February 1999 25 | Livingston | 1–0 | Arbroath | Almondvale Stadium |
| | Fleming 44' |

| 20 February 1999 26 | Livingston | 5–0 | Forfar Athletic | Almondvale Stadium |
| | Robertson 5 pen.', 37'; McCormick 7'; King 18', 61' |

| 27 February 1999 27 | Inverness Caledonian Thistle | 3–1 | Livingston | Caledonian Stadium |
| | McLean 24'; Wilson 31'; Shearer 70'; Fridge (red card) 86' | | McCormick 9'; Deas (red card) 72' |

| 6 March 1999 28 | East Fife | 1–1 | Livingston | Bayview Stadium |
| | Dair 26' | | Fleming 54' |

| 13 March 1999 29 | Livingston | 1–2 | Queen of the South | Almondvale Stadium |
| | Millar (red card) 54'; Robertson 87' | | Townsley 28'; Adams 41'; Lilley (red card) 75' |

| 20 March 1999 30 | Partick Thistle | 1–1 | Livingston | Firhill Stadium |
| | Dunn 44' | | Little 12' |

| 3 April 1999 31 | Livingston | 1–0 | Alloa Athletic | Almondvale Stadium |
| | McPhee 65' | | Haddow (red card) 76' |

| 10 April 1999 32 | Livingston | 2–0 | Clyde | Almondvale Stadium |
| | McPhee 46'; King 68' |

| 17 April 1999 33 | Arbroath | 1–1 | Livingston | Gayfield Park |
| | Crawford 45' | | Robertson 89' |

| 24 April 1999 34 | Stirling Albion | 0–0 | Livingston | Forthbank Stadium |

| 1 May 1999 35 | Livingston | 4–3 | Inverness Caledonian Thistle | Almondvale Stadium |
| | King 8', 10'; Deas 17'; McPhee 23' | | McCulloch 39'; Christie 60'; Stewart 66' |

| 8 May 1999 36 | Forfar Athletic | 1–2 | Livingston | Station Park |
| | McLaughlin 83 pen.' | | McPhee 4'; King 64' |

=== Scottish League Cup ===
| 1 August 1998 First round | Cowdenbeath | 0–2 | Livingston | Central Park |
| 15:00 | | | Millar 17'; Bingham 58' |

| 8 August 1998 Second round | Livingston | 1–0 (a.e.t.) | Dunfermline Athletic | Almondvale Stadium |
| 15:00 | Bennett (red card) 75'; Robertson 93' | | | Attendance: 3,038 |

| 19 August 1998 Third round | Kilmarnock | 3–1 (a.e.t.) | Livingston | Rugby Park |
| 19:45 | Wright 25 pen.', 116'; McCoist 92' | | Bingham 50 pen.' | Attendance: 6,565 |

=== Scottish Cup ===
| 5 December 1998 First round | Dumbarton | 1–1 | Livingston | Boghead Park |
| 15:00 | Flannery 83' | | Sherry (red card) 44'; Millar 59' |

| 8 December 1998 First round replay | Livingston | 3–0 | Dumbarton | Almondvale Stadium |
| 19:30 | Wilson 14 o.g.' Fleming 70'; Bingham 90' |

| 2 January 1999 Second round | Inverness Caledonian Thistle | 1–2 | Livingston | Caledonian Stadium |
| 15:00 | McManus 44 o.g.' | | Bingham 9 pen.' McCormick 63' | Attendance: 3,367 |

| 23 January 1999 Third round | Aberdeen | 0–1 | Livingston | Pittodrie Stadium |
| 15:00 | | | Robertson 61' | Attendance: 10,311 |

| 13 February 1999 Fourth round | Livingston | 1–3 | St Johnstone | Almondvale Stadium |
| 15:00 | Robertson 85' | | Grant 18', 59'; Scott 40' | Attendance: 5,700 |

== Statistics ==
=== League table ===
| Pos | Team | Pld | W | D | L | GF | GA | GD | Pts | Promotion or relegation |
|---|---|---|---|---|---|---|---|---|---|---|
| 1 | Livingston (C, P) | 36 | 22 | 11 | 3 | 64 | 35 | +29 | 77 | Promotion to the First Division |
| 2 | Inverness CT (P) | 36 | 21 | 9 | 6 | 80 | 48 | +32 | 72 | Promotion to the First Division |
| 3 | Clyde | 36 | 15 | 8 | 13 | 46 | 42 | +4 | 53 | |
| 4 | Queen of the South | 36 | 13 | 9 | 14 | 50 | 45 | +5 | 48 | |
| 5 | Alloa Athletic | 36 | 13 | 7 | 16 | 65 | 56 | +9 | 46 | |

Source: "1998-1999 Second Division - SPFL Archive". SPFL.
Rules for classification: 1) points; 2) goal difference; 3) number of goals scored.
(C) Champions; (P) Promoted
