= 1984 Tennent's Sixes =

1983–84 Tennent's Sixes
Tournament details
- Country: Scotland
- Venue(s): Coasters Arena, Falkirk
- Dates: 16 and 17 January 1984
- Teams: 9

Final positions
- Champions: Rangers
- Runners-up: Dundee

Tournament statistics
- Matches played: 12
- Goals scored: 55 (4.58 per match)

The 1984 Tennents' Sixes was the first staging of the indoor 6-a-side football tournament taking place at Coasters Arena in Falkirk on 16 and 17 January and televised on BBC Scotland.

9 teams from the 1983–84 Scottish Premier Division season competed in the inaugural championship with Aberdeen absent and each club received £3000 for appearing.

The tournament had 3 group winners plus the best runners-up qualify to the semi-finals and Rangers beat Dundee in the final.

== Group stage ==
=== Group 1 ===
Team	Pld	W	L	GF	GA	GD	Pts
Rangers	2	2	0	5	2	3	4
St Johnstone	2	1	1	5	5	0	2
Hibernian	2	0	2	2	5	-3	0

Home team	Score	Away team	Date
Rangers	3–2	St Johnstone	16 January 1984
Rangers	2–0	Hibernian	16 January 1984
St Johnstone	3–2	Hibernian	17 January 1984

=== Group 2 ===
Team	Pld	W	L	GF	GA	GD	Pts
Dundee	2	2	0	8	2	6	4
Celtic	2	1	1	4	4	0	2
Heart of Midlothian	2	0	2	0	6	-6	0

Home team	Score	Away team	Date
Dundee	4–2	Celtic	16 January 1984
Dundee	4–0	Heart of Midlothian	16 January 1984
Celtic	2–0	Heart of Midlothian	17 January 1984

=== Group 3 ===
Team	Pld	W	L	GF	GA	GD	Pts
Dundee United	2	1	1	4	3	1	2
Motherwell	2	1	1	5	5	0	2
St Mirren	2	1	1	3	4	-1	2

Home team	Score	Away team	Date
Dundee United	3–2	Motherwell	16 January 1984
St Mirren	1–1	Dundee United	16 January 1984
Motherwell	3–2	St Mirren	17 January 1984

== Semi-finals ==
17 January 1984

Rangers	2 – 1	Motherwell

Coasters Arena, Falkirk

17 January 1984

Dundee	4 – 2	Dundee United

Coasters Arena, Falkirk

== Final ==
17 January 1984
15:00

Rangers	6 - 4	Dundee
Williamson; Cooper; Dawson; Davies		Ferguson; McKinlay; Stephen

Coasters Arena, Falkirk

== Prize money ==
A breakdown of prize money from the tournament sponsors.

Prize money	Amount
Tournament participation	£3,000
Losing semi-finalists	£1,000
Losing finalists	£1,500
Tournament winners	£2,000

== Incidents and events ==
- Falkirk played East Stirling for the Falkirk Herald Cup as pre tournament curtain raiser.
- The Coasters trophy was decided between six amateur clubs.
- Davie Cooper of Rangers' goal against St Johnstone was the tournament's first ever goal.
- Jock Wallace Jr. installed Alex Totten as Rangers head coach for event.
