= 1988 Tennent's Sixes =

1988 edition of Scottish indoor football tournament

1987–88 Tennent's Sixes
Tournament details
- Country: Scotland
- Venue(s): Scottish Exhibition and Conference Centre, Glasgow
- Dates: 24 and 25 January 1988
- Teams: 12

Final positions
- Champions: Dundee
- Runners-up: Motherwell

Tournament statistics
- Matches played: 19
- Goals scored: 94 (4.95 per match)
- Top goal scorer: Alan Lawrence (5)

The 1988 Tennent's Sixes, the fifth staging of the Tennent's Sixes, was played at the Scottish Exhibition and Conference Centre (SECC) in Glasgow on 24 and 25 January 1988. It was the third successive edition held at the venue.

Rangers declined to enter, so the other eleven clubs from the 1987–88 Scottish Premier Division were joined by Brian Clough's Nottingham Forest. Dundee beat Motherwell 3–2 in the final for their first tournament win. They scored 22 goals across five matches, while Alan Lawrence finished as leading scorer with five.

== Format ==
Four groups of three were used, with each club playing twice. A win was worth two points and drawn group matches were settled by penalty shoot-outs. Eight clubs progressed, with the top two in each section qualifying for the quarter-finals.

Dundee assistant manager Drew Jarvie took charge of the side for the tournament. Goalkeeper Bobby Geddes captained their ten-man squad.

== Group stage ==
Dundee, Motherwell, St Mirren, Hibernian, Dunfermline Athletic, Nottingham Forest, Dundee United and Aberdeen qualified for the quarter-finals. Celtic finished level on points with Hibernian and Dunfermline Athletic in Group 3 but were eliminated on goal difference. The group results and shoot-out outcome are also recorded by the Scottish Football Historical Archive.

=== Group 1 ===
Team	Pld	W	L	GF	GA	GD	Pts
Dundee	2	2	0	11	4	+7	4
Aberdeen	2	1	1	5	3	+2	2
Morton	2	0	2	4	13	−9	0

Team	Score	Team	Date
Aberdeen	4–1	Morton	24 January 1988
Dundee	2–1	Aberdeen	24 January 1988
Dundee	9–3	Morton	24 January 1988

=== Group 2 ===
Team	Pld	W	L	GF	GA	GD	Pts
Motherwell	2	1	1	2	0	+2	2
St Mirren	2	1	1	5	6	−1	2
Heart of Midlothian	2	1	1	4	5	−1	2

Team	Score	Team	Date
Heart of Midlothian	0–0; Hearts won 3–1 on penalties	Motherwell	24 January 1988
Motherwell	2–0	St Mirren	24 January 1988
St Mirren	5–4	Heart of Midlothian	24 January 1988

=== Group 3 ===
Team	Pld	W	L	GF	GA	GD	Pts
Hibernian	2	1	1	6	4	+2	2
Dunfermline Athletic	2	1	1	5	5	0	2
Celtic	2	1	1	6	8	−2	2

Team	Score	Team	Date
Celtic	4–3	Dunfermline Athletic	24 January 1988
Hibernian	5–2	Celtic	24 January 1988
Dunfermline Athletic	2–1	Hibernian	24 January 1988

=== Group 4 ===
Team	Pld	W	L	GF	GA	GD	Pts
Nottingham Forest	2	2	0	5	2	+3	4
Dundee United	2	1	1	7	4	+3	2
Falkirk	2	0	2	2	8	−6	0

Team	Score	Team	Date
Dundee United	6–1	Falkirk	24 January 1988
Nottingham Forest	2–1	Falkirk	24 January 1988
Nottingham Forest	3–1	Dundee United	24 January 1988

== Knockout stage ==
=== Quarter-finals ===
Time	Team	Score	Team	Date
19:00	Dundee	4–3	Dundee United	25 January 1988
19:25	Motherwell	2–1	Dunfermline Athletic	25 January 1988
19:50	Hibernian	2–2; St Mirren won 4–3 on penalties	St Mirren	25 January 1988
20:15	Aberdeen	1–1; Aberdeen won 4–3 on penalties	Nottingham Forest	25 January 1988

Lawrence scored twice in Dundee's 4–3 win over Dundee United, with Stewart Forsyth and Keith Wright also on the scoresheet. Dundee had led 4–1 before United scored twice late in the match. Motherwell's 2–1 victory over Dunfermline Athletic completed the two quarter-finals settled in normal time; St Mirren and Aberdeen went through on penalty shoot-outs.

=== Semi-finals ===
Time	Team	Score	Team	Date
20:45	Motherwell	4–2	St Mirren	25 January 1988
21:10	Dundee	4–1	Aberdeen	25 January 1988

Dundee's four goals against Aberdeen came from Forsyth, Tommy Coyne, Graham Harvey and Wright. Forsyth's opener was scored shortly before half-time, with the other three coming after the interval.

=== Final ===
Time	Team	Score	Team	Date
22:00	Dundee	3–2	Motherwell	25 January 1988

Tosh McKinlay opened the scoring after 43 seconds. Harvey and Coyne supplied Dundee's other goals, while Martin McBride and Tommy Philliben scored for Motherwell. The win gave Dundee their first Tennent's Sixes title.

== Prize money ==
Dundee received £12,000 as winners and Motherwell £10,500 as runners-up. A further £1,000 was awarded to the highest-scoring side, which also went to Dundee after their 22 goals in five matches.

Morton were reported to have received £9,000 in appearance money for taking part.

== Attendance and other events ==
The three sessions at the SECC drew a combined attendance of more than 22,000. Scotsport televised the competition, with Arthur Montford presenting.

Snow in the Midlands affected Nottingham Forest's journey north after their league match at Watford. They reached Glasgow only shortly before the opening session. St Mirren were also delayed, in their case by traffic, and the running order for the opening ceremony had to be altered.

Morton manager Allan McGraw criticised his players after their 9–3 defeat by Dundee and withheld their individual appearance payments, reported as £100 per player.
