= Davie Cooper =

Scottish footballer (1956–1995)

Personal information
- Full name: David Cooper
- Date of birth: 25 February 1956
- Place of birth: Hamilton, Scotland
- Date of death: 23 March 1995 (aged 39)
- Place of death: Glasgow, Scotland
- Height: 5 ft 9 in (1.75 m)
- Position: Winger

Youth career
- 1972–1974: Hamilton Avondale

Senior career*
Years	Team	Apps	(Gls)
1974–1977	Clydebank	90	(28)
1977–1989	Rangers	376	(49)
1989–1993	Motherwell	157	(17)
1993–1995	Clydebank	39	(1)
Total		662	(95)

International career
1976–1977	Scotland U21	6	(1)
1979–1990	Scotland	22	(6)
- * Club domestic league appearances and goals

David Cooper (25 February 1956 – 23 March 1995) was a Scottish professional footballer who played as a winger.

Born in Hamilton, Cooper played as a youth for local side Hamilton Avondale, whilst also working as an apprentice printer for the club's owners. His talents were noticed by numerous top-flight clubs in Scotland and England. Cooper chose to sign for Scottish Second Division side Clydebank in 1974, beginning his career as a professional footballer. Cooper continued to show potential at Clydebank, finishing as the club's top scorer in his second full season and helping the club achieve successive league promotions in 1975–76 and 1976–77.

Cooper signed for Rangers in June 1977 for a fee of £100,000 at the age of 21. The next 12 years would see him become a Rangers stalwart, playing 540 games and winning numerous trophies with club, including the Scottish Premier Division in 1977–78, 1986–87 and 1988–89. In August 1989, Tommy McLean signed Cooper for Motherwell for a fee of £50,000. He played over 150 times for the club and was part of the team that won the 1991 Scottish Cup Final against Dundee United. Cooper also represented the Scotland national team from 1979 to 1990; he won 22 caps and scored 6 goals. He represented Scotland at the 1986 FIFA World Cup in Mexico, making two appearances at the tournament.

In his later career, Cooper returned to Clydebank as a player/assistant coach. He intended to retire as a player at the end of the 1995 season, but on 22 March 1995 he suffered a subarachnoid haemorrhage at Broadwood Stadium in Cumbernauld whilst filming Shoot, a youth coaching television programme. He died the following day at the age of 39. An inductee of the Scottish Football Hall of Fame, Cooper is regarded by many as one of Scottish football's greatest talents.

== Early life ==
Every time you saw him when he was a wee boy, he had a ball at his feet. Even then he was football daft. And after he moved away, if you saw him in the street he would always stop and ask you how you were.

— James Low, a neighbour of the Cooper family in Brankholm Brae, paying tribute to Cooper in 1995.

David Cooper was born in Hamilton, Scotland, on 25 February 1956 to John (1918–1998) and Jean Cooper (née Pollock) (1926–2012). His father was employed as a steel worker at the nearby Lanarkshire Steel Works, while his mother worked as a barmaid at the Lariat Hostelry in Hamilton. Along with his elder brother John, Cooper was a Rangers supporter in his youth and regularly attended matches at Ibrox with his father, later travelling by himself on local supporters buses to Glasgow.

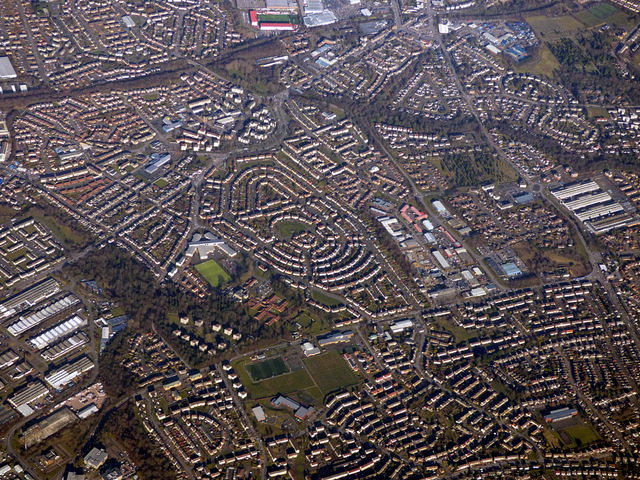
The Hillhouse Estate where Cooper was raised, pictured in 2018.

He initially attended Beckford Street Primary in Hamilton before moving on to Udston Primary. Cooper was soon made captain of the Udston primary team and played as an inside forward (roughly equivalent to a modern-day deep-lying striker). As an Udston Primary player, Cooper and his team won the Shinwell Cup youth tournament, beating Low Waters Primary 4–2 in the final at Douglas Park, the former home of Hamilton Academical.

Following his primary education, Cooper attended St. John's Grammar School (now Hamilton Grammar School). Initially, Cooper was dissatisfied with his new surroundings, especially due to St John's failure to organise a school football team until his third year. Bill and Rose MacKenzie, who were friends of Cooper's parents, decided to set up a new youth football team called Udston United. Cooper became one of the club's first players and, when not training or playing matches, helped promote the new club in the local community.

Davie's older brother John, who was sixteen at the time, travelled to England for a trial period with Hull City. John found his spell there particularly difficult and struggled with homesickness and the tough-tackling defenders who were prevalent at the time. John returned to Scotland after two years and joined Larkhall Thistle.

Cooper himself later moved on to Hamilton Avondale, a local youth team founded by brothers Alan and Stuart Noble, the owners of the Avondale Works. He began with the under–16 team, before progressing to the under–18 team. His first International recognition came when he was selected to represent Scotland's Amateur League side and played against the youth squads of England, Northern Ireland and Wales. During this time he was also working as an apprentice printer at the Noble's Office at Hamilton Avondale. Rangers, Motherwell, Clyde and Clydebank, together with English sides Coventry City and Crystal Palace, all expressed an interest in signing Cooper.

== Club career ==
=== Clydebank (1974–77) ===
Davie's apprenticeship as a printer with the Noble family at their Almada Street offices came to an end when he reached 18. By that point, Cooper had almost no involvement in football activities outside of his work. Stuart Noble, one of the owners of Hamilton Avondale, contacted Clydebank director Jack Steedman, who quickly appeared in his car outside the Avondale offices with the hope of convincing Cooper to join the club. Steedman (who was well aware of Cooper's capabilities) signed the youngster on 16 May 1974. Years later, Steedman admitted: "I raided the Bankies' club safe and took the silver from the gaming machines in the social club and transferred it into pound notes. I took £300 worth of beer-stained notes, drove to the printing works in Hamilton where he worked and convinced him to sign for the club. In forty years of football, it was the best thing I ever did."

At this point, under the management of Bill Munro, Clydebank were an ambitious outfit with players such as Jimmy Lumsden, Gregor Abel, Jim Fallon and Peter Kane in their ranks, albeit with limited training facilities and an ash training pitch. When describing Cooper's first spell with Clydebank, Fallon stated: "It definitely toughened him up, because these were the days where defenders were allowed to tackle really hard and you had to be a resilient character to keep charging down the wing in these circumstances."

Cooper made his debut for Clydebank against Airdrieonians in the Scottish League Cup. During this time, the League Cup format involved nine groups of four teams, Clydebank were placed in group seven with Airdrieonians, St Mirren and Stirling Albion. The first game took place on 10 August 1974; Airdrie won 4–0. His full debut was also against Airdrie in the second meeting of the two sides in the group, on Wednesday 28 August, but again Airdrie won, this time by 2–1. This game was his first appearance at New Kilbowie Park. Clydebank finished bottom of group seven with two wins and four losses.

Cooper's Scottish League debut came in the Second Division, in the last season before League re-construction, on Saturday 31 August 1974 where Clydebank were defeated 3–0 away to Queen of the South. He first played on the winning side for the Bankies on 30 November, when they beat Cowdenbeath at Kilbowie 2–1. His first goal for the team came two games later when, again at Kilbowie, he scored the third goal in the 4–1 defeat of Alloa Athletic. Cooper ended the season with 29 starts, 2 as a substitute, and scored 5 goals.

In the 1975–76 season, Cooper was one of four ever-presents. He finished top of the Clydebank goalscoring list with 13 in the League, three of which were penalties. His first hat-trick in senior football included two penalties at Alloa Athletic, where Clydebank won 3–1. Clydebank achieved promotion that season to the Scottish First Division, with their final match being a 2–0 win against Forfar Athletic at New Kilbowie Park, in which Cooper scored the opening goal from a penalty. Cooper played in all of Clydebank's 49 games that season, scoring 22 goals. Clydebank received a transfer bid of £65,000 from Aston Villa (under the management of Ron Saunders) for Cooper's services, with Villa offering Cooper a salary more than treble what he was receiving at Clydebank. Despite this, the offer was brushed aside by Cooper and Clydebank, with the hopes of continued success going into the new division.

The following season found Clydebank to be a strong force in the 1976–77 Scottish First Division. They regularly battled for supremacy with a talented St Mirren side, at that point under the management of a young Alex Ferguson. The team achieved some remarkable results, including a 6–0 away win to East Fife on 4 December 1976 and an unprecedented 8–1 home victory against Arbroath on 3 January 1977, during which Cooper scored another hat-trick for the side. With the help of Cooper's talent, the club recorded a run of seventeen matches without defeat between December 1975 and October 1976.

A major opportunity was presented to Cooper when Clydebank were drawn against his boyhood club Rangers in the quarter-final of the Scottish League Cup in September 1976. Rangers, under the management of Jock Wallace, had secured the Scottish treble the previous season and were looking for young, creative players to add to their ranks. The first leg took place at Ibrox on 22 September 1976. Throughout the match, Clydebank and Cooper proved to be tricky opponents. Around two minutes in, defender John Greig tackled Cooper and said: "If I get another chance, I'll break your leg." The Clydebank side held their own and recorded a 3–3 draw with Rangers, with Cooper scoring the side's crucial equaliser in the 78th minute. The return leg match was held at Kilbowie Park on 6 October 1976. This time, Greig opened the scoring for the away side in the 43rd minute. Cooper levelled the scoring in the 60th minute and the game finished 1–1. A third meeting to decide the winner took place on 18 October 1976, which ended in a 0–0 draw. Finally, Rangers overcame the Clydebank team on 19 October 1976 at Firhill Stadium, the fourth meeting between the sides. Derek Parlane opened the scoring in the 6th minute, however Cooper equalised for Clydebank a minute later. Bobby McKean scored the decisive goal in the tie in the 61st minute, to ensure Rangers progressed to the semi-finals.

For his performances, it was clear that Rangers were ready to offer Cooper a contract. The Govan side initially offered Clydebank £50,000, the sum increasing numerous times, eventually reaching an agreement on £100,000 to secure Cooper as a Rangers player. He travelled with his father and elder brother to a meeting with Rangers executives including Wallace, Willie Waddell and Willie Thornton. The fee and a salary of £10,000 were agreed, of which Cooper received £3,500 after tax.

Soon to be a Rangers player, Cooper's final goal for the Bankies was against Raith Rovers in a 2–0 win at New Kilbowie on 23 April 1977. His final game for the club was against Falkirk at Brockville in a 4–2 win, a week later.

=== Rangers ===
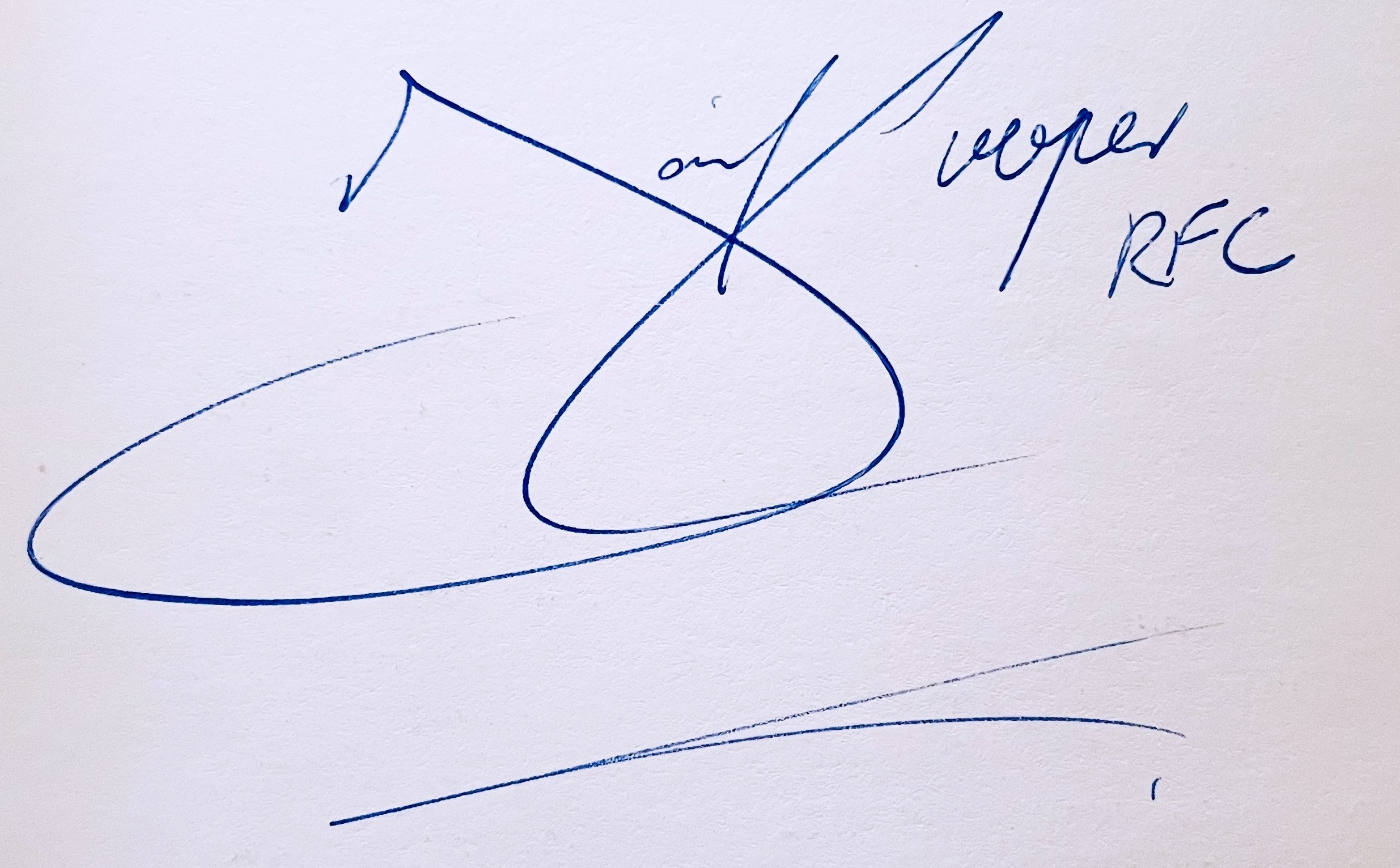
Cooper's signature during his time at Rangers.

At the age of 21, Cooper joined up with Jock Wallace's side in the summer of 1977, along with new signings Bobby Russell and Gordon Smith. The trio of youngsters formed a close bond in their initial weeks at the club. Defensively, Rangers had depth and quality with players such as John Greig, Tom Forsyth, Colin Jackson and Sandy Jardine. Cooper, Russell and Smith were brought in to establish more cutting-edge attacking play going forward.

Despite losing the first two league games of the 1977–78 season, the new attacking trio soon found form. Following a 4–0 victory away to Partick Thistle, Cooper was involved in his first Old Firm match on 10 September 1977, a 3–2 home victory against Celtic. Describing the intensity of the match, Cooper said: "even though we were tired by the end, we had to keep going for the fans." Cooper scored his first league goal for Rangers in the following match, a 3–3 draw against St Mirren on 17 September 1977 at Love Street. His first Ibrox goal came against his former club Clydebank on 1 October 1977. Cooper scored twice in the match, including one directly from a corner kick. The club followed this with a run of ten games undefeated, ending with a 4–0 loss away to Aberdeen two months later on 24 December 1977. His first trophy with Rangers came on 18 March 1978 after defeating Celtic 2–1 in the 1978 Scottish League Cup Final at Hampden Park, with Cooper and Smith on the scoresheet. In the league, Rangers narrowly secured the title by two points over Aberdeen, following a 2–0 home victory against Motherwell on 29 April 1978 with goals from Smith and Jackson. They would again face a challenge from Aberdeen in the 1978 Scottish Cup Final on 6 May 1978. Goals from Alex MacDonald and Derek Johnstone secured a 2–1 victory at Hampden, and a domestic treble for Rangers. Cooper appeared in fifty-two of the fifty-three matches Rangers played in his first year at the club and scored eight goals.

To the surprise of many, manager Jock Wallace abruptly left Rangers on 23 May 1978 and was replaced by John Greig. The club made a poor start to the 1978–79 season, failing to win their first six league encounters. Despite this however, they recorded victories against Juventus and PSV Eindhoven in the European Cup, with Cooper failing to be selected for the ties by Greig. A mixed season domestically followed and they had all but lost the title in a 4–2 away defeat to Celtic on 21 May 1979. Describing losing the championship, Cooper said "you just want to emigrate as soon as you have got changed and walked out of the ground. It is like a spectre which haunts you for weeks." Despite this, Rangers won the 1979 Scottish League Cup Final in a 2–1 victory against Aberdeen and were victorious in the 1979 Scottish Cup Final, winning 3–2 over Hibernian. Tensions were beginning to rise between Cooper and Greig, mainly due to less-frequent selection of Cooper by the new manager. Cooper would often return home to Hamilton complaining the club he loved was "kicking him in the teeth".

On 4 August 1979, Cooper scored a memorable solo goal against Celtic in the 1979 Drybrough Cup Final at Hampden. A crossed ball in from Alex MacDonald met Cooper at the edge of the box, where he went on to "keepie up" the ball over Roddie MacDonald, Murdo MacLeod, Tom McAdam and Alan Sneddon before slotting the ball past onrushing Celtic goalkeeper Peter Latchford. The goal was voted the greatest ever Rangers goal by Rangers fans and listed by Rob Smyth of The Guardian as the second greatest ever solo goal, after Diego Maradona's Goal of the Century. Sandy Jardine, who had scored a spectacular second goal for Rangers during the match, admitted his goal had been overshadowed by Cooper's. "I scored one of my best goals that day," said Jardine, "and it hardly got a mention." That season, Cooper made 49 appearances and scored ten goals.

The summer of 1979 brought new interest in Cooper's services from clubs such as Newcastle United, Coventry City and West Bromwich Albion, which were once again turned down by Cooper in favour of staying close to home. The 1979–80 season was the first of only three seasons during his time at Ibrox that the club failed to win a trophy. In 1980, Brighton manager Alan Mullery reportedly placed a bid for both Cooper and Rangers teammate Gordon Smith; Smith moved on, Cooper stayed.

The following season (1980–81), Cooper started fewer than half of the scheduled league games. He was, however, part of the starting line-up for the Scottish Cup final replay against Dundee United which Rangers won. This was his last Scottish Cup winners medal for the Ibrox side.

In the 1981–82 season, Cooper started his 21st consecutive League Cup tie for Rangers as they won through to the Final. His only goal in the Ibrox side's 11 ties came in the Final. Cooper played in all but six league fixtures as Rangers attained third place.

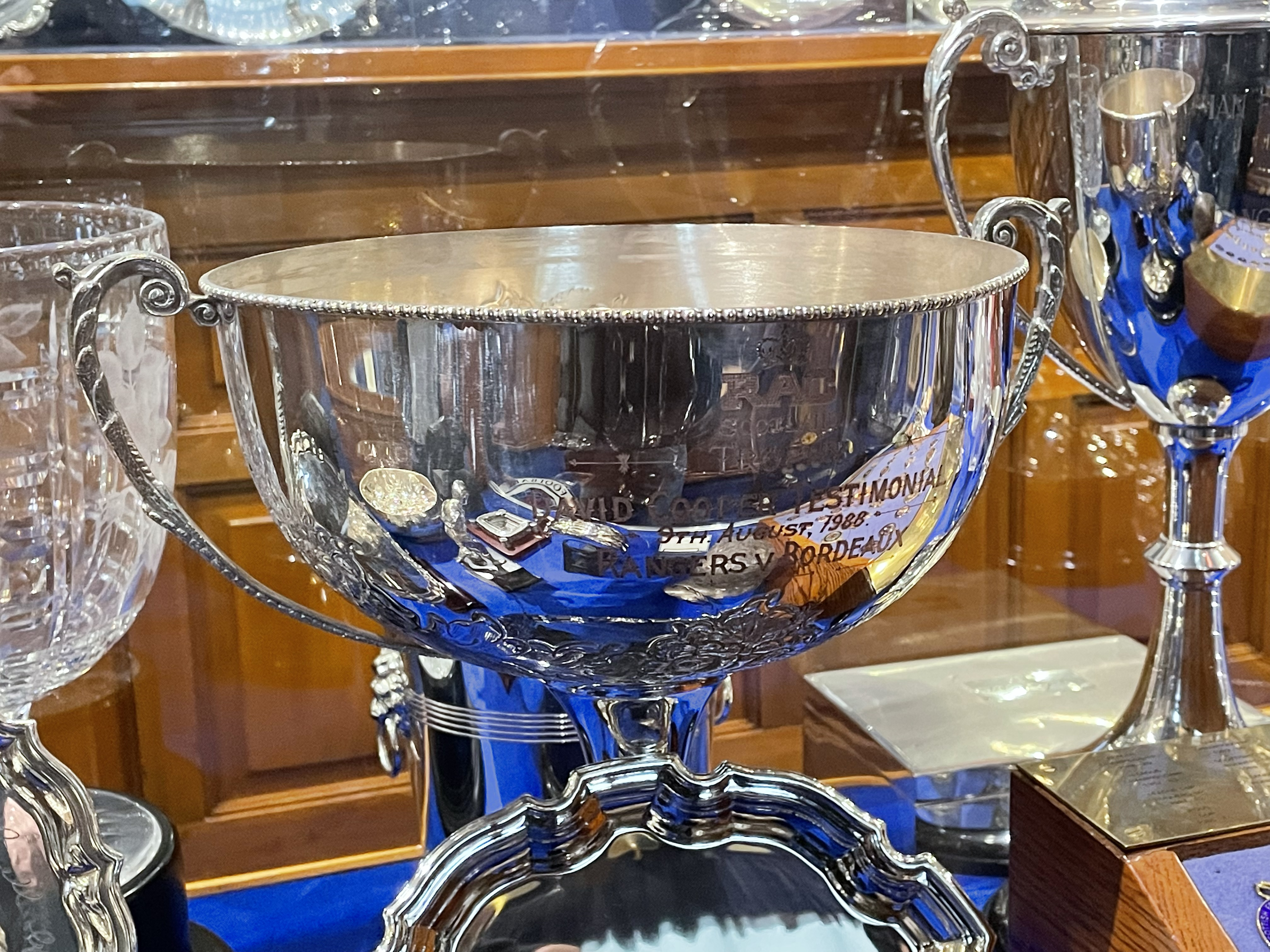
Trophy from Cooper's testimonial game against Girondins de Bordeaux, August 1988.

In the 1982–83 season, Cooper scored his first hat-trick for Rangers (in a sectional League Cup tie against Kilmarnock) and his first and only European goal, against Borussia Dortmund at Ibrox, in the UEFA Cup. It was his most prolific goalscoring season for the club, scoring 12 goals in all competitions.

Cooper scored eight Scottish Premier Division goals in the 1986–87 season, when Rangers won their first league title for nine years.

Cooper won League Cup medals in 1983–84, 1984–85, 1986–87 and 1987–88. He scored the winning goal from the penalty spot in 1986–87 against Celtic. The following season he scored a free-kick, Rangers's first goal, in a 3–3 draw against Aberdeen. Rangers won 5–3 on penalties, Cooper claiming a seventh winner's medal.

On 9 August 1988, Cooper's testimonial match against Girondins de Bordeaux saw over 43,000 spectators watch Rangers win 3–2 with Terry Butcher, Kevin Drinkell and Ally McCoist netting for Rangers. Cooper finished his Rangers career with 75 goals in 540 appearances. When asked to describe the highlight of his time at Rangers, he simply responded "I played for the team I loved."

=== Motherwell ===
Following the Souness Revolution at Ibrox and an influx of high-profile signings, Cooper's presence in the Rangers first team began to decrease. Broadcaster Tam Cowan stated: "He (Souness) was bringing in guys like Mark Walters, exciting talent out on the wing from down south. But Davie, because he loved the game so much, just wanted to go somewhere where he could play first team football." Souness later admitted his mistake in allowing Cooper to leave for Motherwell, saying: "I regret the fact I didn't say no to him at that time. He went on to play brilliantly at the highest level for another three years."

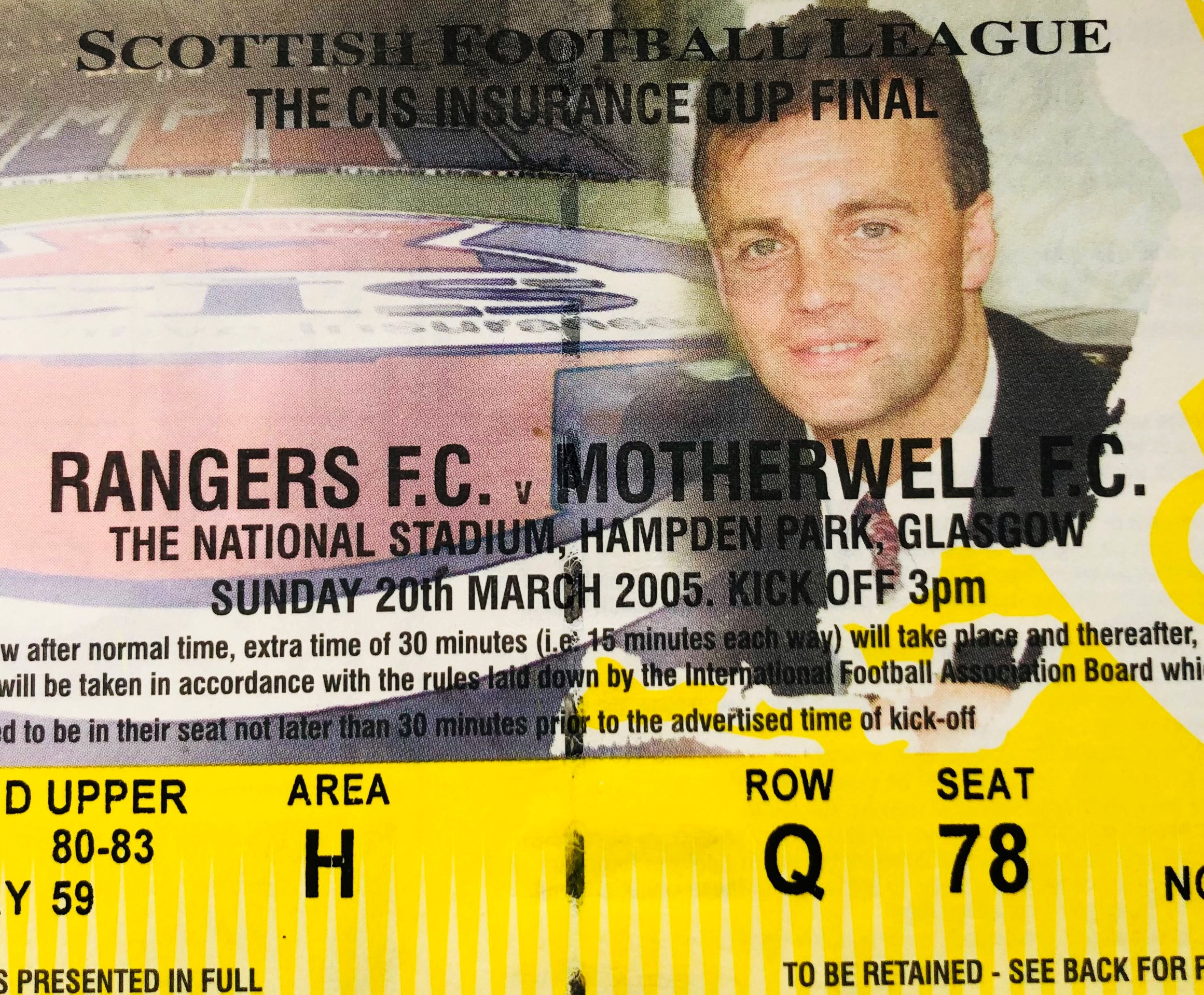
Cooper featured on the tickets for the 2005 Scottish League Cup Final, which was contested by his former clubs Rangers and Motherwell.

After 12 years at Ibrox, Cooper signed for Motherwell, then managed by former teammate Tommy McLean in August 1989 for a fee of £50,000. His debut for the club came at Rugby Park in a midweek Scottish League Cup tie against Kilmarnock on 15 August 1989. Motherwell won the match 4–1, with Cooper assisting in three of the four goals scored. He scored his first goal for the North Lanarkshire side the following month, in a 3–0 win against Dundee at Fir Park on 30 September 1989.

Cooper spent nearly five years with Motherwell, going on to play over 150 times for the Steelmen. Perhaps his most notable achievement during his Motherwell spell was contributing to the club winning its first major trophy in 39 years: The 1990–91 Scottish Cup against Dundee United, in which Motherwell won 4–3 after extra-time in the final. The following day, Cooper and his teammates paraded the streets of Motherwell on an open top bus, with thousands of fans gathering to celebrate the club's success.

=== Return to Clydebank (1993–95) ===
While with Motherwell, Cooper had been working in a coaching capacity with the reserve and youth sides. In December 1993 he returned to Clydebank as a player, but also to assist in coaching duties. In 1993–94 he played in a total of 20 games, including sixteen starts and four as a substitute. In 1994–95 he was almost an ever-present in the side until the start of February, when he played his last first team match against Hearts in a Scottish Cup third round replay at Tynecastle on 7 February 1995.

Cooper had scored his last goal in a Challenge Cup semi-final against Airdrie earlier that season, and his last appearance in a Clydebank jersey was in a reserve fixture at New Kilbowie on 21 February 1995 against Hamilton Academical.

== International career ==
Cooper made his international debut for Scotland under-21s in the 1976–77 season in a 0–0 draw versus the Czech Republic in Plzeň. He won another three caps that season, versus Wales, Switzerland and England.

His full international debut for Scotland came on 12 September 1979, in a 1–1 draw with Peru at Hampden Park. Cooper played for the national team again the following month in a 1–1 draw at home to Austria in the Euro 1980 qualifiers, but after that he wasn't capped again for over four years. Cooper returned to the national team on 28 February 1984, scoring against Wales in a 2–1 British Home Championship win, and he was on the scoresheet for Scotland again later in the year in a 6–1 friendly win over Yugoslavia.

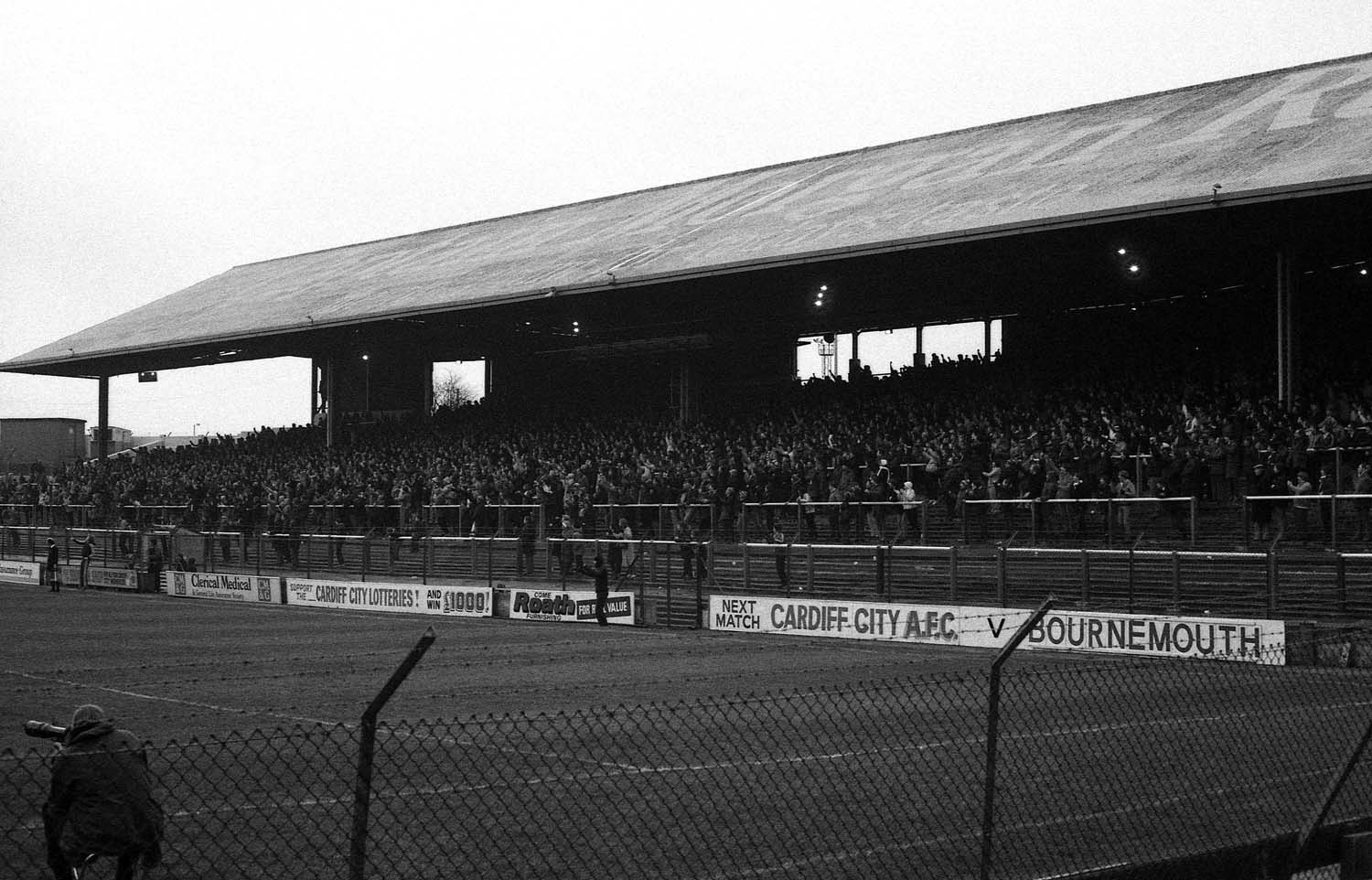
Ninian Park, Cardiff. The ground at which Cooper scored his crucial penalty and helped Scotland's efforts for a place at the 1986 FIFA World Cup.

Cooper became a regular in the Scotland team and prior to the 1986 World Cup, playing in 11 consecutive games. A key match was the last qualification group match, against Wales in September 1985, in which Scotland needed at least a draw to keep their qualification hopes alive. Cooper began the match on the bench and Scotland struggled early on, as Mark Hughes scored for Wales in the 13th minute and goalkeeper Jim Leighton struggled with vision after losing a contact lens. Scotland manager Jock Stein replaced Gordon Strachan with Cooper in the 61st minute. With nine minutes remaining, Scotland were awarded a penalty kick that Cooper scored. As the game ended in a 1–1 draw, the Scotland team and around 12,000 travelling fans celebrated their survival in the competition. The achievement was completely overshadowed by the collapse and death of Jock Stein, who fell ill at the final whistle and died 30 minutes later.

Cooper also scored in a 2–0 win against Australia in the qualification play-off, and made two appearances in the finals in Mexico. Cooper scored his final two goals (from six in total) for Scotland on 12 November 1986 in a 3–0 home win against Luxembourg in a Euro 88 qualifier. He was capped twice for Scotland as a Motherwell player, and the last of his 22 caps was earned on 16 May 1990 in a friendly against Egypt at Pittodrie. An injury precluded him from being selected for the Scotland squad for the 1990 FIFA World Cup finals.

Cooper's final Scotland cap was auctioned by his friend John Semple in 2014. It was displayed at the Ideal Home Show in Glasgow's SECC before an auction at McTear's Auctioneers with an estimated value of around £8,000.

== Style of play ==
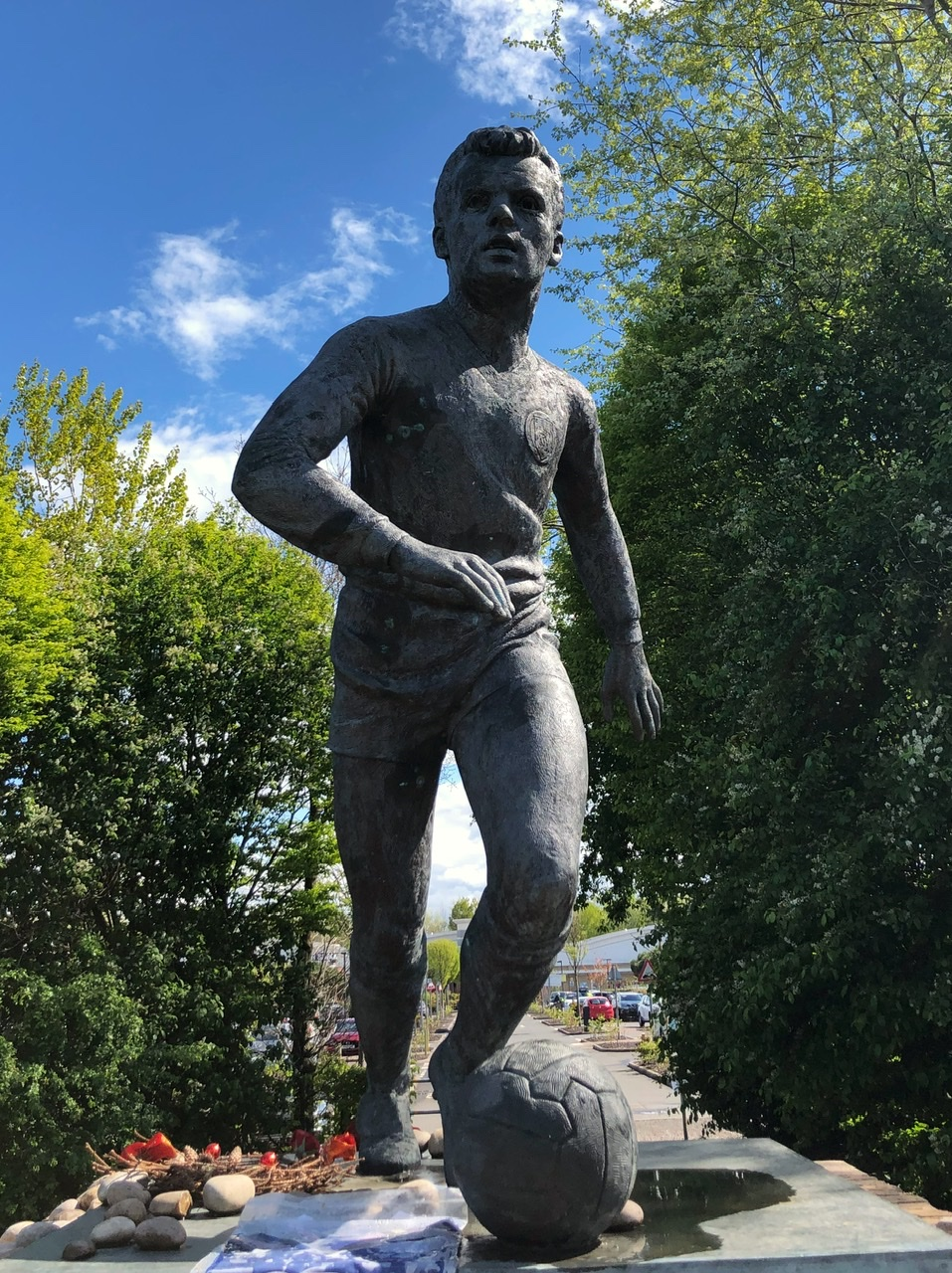
Statue of Cooper in his hometown of Hamilton.

Cooper has been regarded by many as one of the greatest players in Scottish football history. A winger, he became a notoriously difficult opponent due to his creative and elegant playing style, with strength and manipulation of the ball allowing him to ease past opposition players. Former teammate Mark Walters said in an interview on Cooper: "He could just glide past players, drop a shoulder and go. He used to manipulate the ball. Watching him made me a better player". Despite not being blessed with pace, his close ball control, strength and "dip of the shoulder" allowed him to create many assists and score goals throughout his career.

Cooper was particularly gifted on his left foot, allowing him to deliver precise crosses and set pieces. Discussing Cooper's left footed ability, former Scotland manager Andy Roxburgh said: "He could have played a violin with it. He didn't need a right foot. He was so perfectly balanced, so technically gifted on his left, that he could do anything. There were no limitations. He could beat people any way; right, left, double back and beat them again". At Cooper's testimonial dinner, in reference to his left-footed ability, friend and teammate Ally McCoist gifted him a mannequin right leg in Rangers colours, to which Cooper replied "the one thing I never had".

== Personal life ==
Cooper began dating Christine McMeekin in summer 1975 after meeting at an ice rink. They married in spring 1980 at Coatdyke Congregational Church in the town of Airdrie and had one daughter. At the time of Cooper's death, the couple had been separated for several years. Outside of football, Cooper was a keen squash and tennis player and cited the Swedish tennis player Björn Borg as one of his heroes.

Cooper was often reluctant to speak to the press and rarely participated in interviews. This led to him being nicknamed "The Moody Blue" due to his reserved nature, despite many of his colleagues and friends praising his personality. Journalist and friend Hugh Keevins said in an article on Cooper: "He could be grumpy like any other human being in a stressful occupation, but I remember the ready smile and the winning personality."

One particularly close friend was Ally McCoist, who said in newspaper tribute to Cooper: ″I still regard myself as being blessed to have gained the chance to live and work and share football memories with Davie, whether at Ibrox or when we were in Scotland squads or just chewing the fat about the game we loved.″ McCoist and Derek Johnstone visited Cooper in hospital shortly before his death.

== Death ==
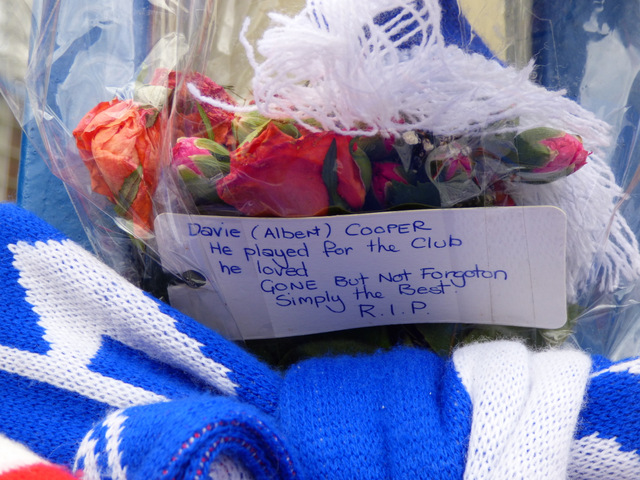
One fan's floral tribute to Cooper, outside Ibrox Stadium in 2018.

In the lead-up to his retirement, Cooper got involved in coaching roles both with his club and in local communities. He began presenting a coaching television series for youngsters called Shoot for Scottish Television, along with former Celtic, Arsenal, Aberdeen and Scotland player Charlie Nicholas and former Sheffield Wednesday player Tommy Craig. Cooper collapsed suddenly on the morning of 22 March 1995 at a training pitch adjacent to Broadwood Stadium in Cumbernauld during a recording session for an episode. Medical staff at the ground and series director Ian Hamilton attempted to resuscitate Cooper at the scene before an ambulance crew arrived.

He was taken to Monklands General Hospital, where a CT scan confirmed a subarachnoid haemorrhage. Cooper was transferred to the Institute for Neurological Sciences at Glasgow's Southern General Hospital, where consultant neurosurgeon Professor Garth Cruickshank took charge of the case. His condition deteriorated during the night. In his announcement to the media, Cruickshank stated that Cooper would not have been aware at any point of what was going on. In the early hours of the following morning on 23 March 1995, Cooper's life support machine was turned off and he died at the age of 39.

Thousands of mourners lined the neighbourhood streets of Hamilton and many of the biggest names in Scottish football attended his funeral, which took place at Hillhouse Parish Church, Hamilton, on 27 March 1995. Cooper was buried in the town's Bent Cemetery.

=== Tributes ===
The news of Cooper's death was met with widespread sadness from across the country and the footballing world, much of which is still felt today. Supporters of Clydebank, Rangers and Motherwell left tributes outside their respective grounds. Jock Wallace Jr. (who had signed Cooper for Rangers in 1977) said: "My feelings go out to his family and loved ones, who will have to be strong through this ordeal." The (then) Scottish Football Association chief executive Jim Farry stated: "It is tragic that one with such skills and knowledge will no longer be able to impart them to young players."

It emerged that, after his retirement, Cooper had intended to share his footballing knowledge and skills with youngsters in creating a David Cooper Soccer School in conjunction with Clydebank. "It was our intention to take football to the children of the country" said Jack Steedman, whose club had helped Cooper develop his own skills throughout the early 1970s. Subsequently, a seven-a-side tournament for schoolchildren, The Davie Cooper Soccer Sevens, was named in his honour in 1995; it takes place annually in his hometown of Hamilton.

The Davie Cooper Scottish Aneurysm Study Group was founded as part of Graham Teasdale's research into the familial risk of Subarachnoid Haemorrhage (SAH) which included a survey of over 8500 relatives of patients with a SAH. The survey has been cited by numerous medical researchers in the study of intracranial aneurysms.

== Legacy ==
Cooper is remembered as one of the most significant players in the histories of Clydebank, Rangers and Motherwell football clubs. He was inducted into the Rangers Hall of Fame in 2000, Clydebank's in 2008 and Motherwell's in 2020.

"God gave Davie Cooper a talent. He would not be disappointed with how it was used."

— Walter Smith

Dutch international Ruud Gullit played against Cooper in a friendly match for Feyenoord against Rangers, after which he called Cooper one of the greatest players he had ever seen. Gullit later named Cooper in his greatest XI in football magazine Four Four Two. 25 years after his sudden death, Gullit commented: "So, it's 25 years ago already, and we have to celebrate him. Davie Cooper forever."

Ex-Rangers forward, David Templeton, was named after Cooper by his father, ex pro Henry Templeton. David Templeton's full name is David Cooper Templeton. Ibrox features a matchday hospitality suite named Club Cooper, where various photographs of Cooper are displayed on the walls.

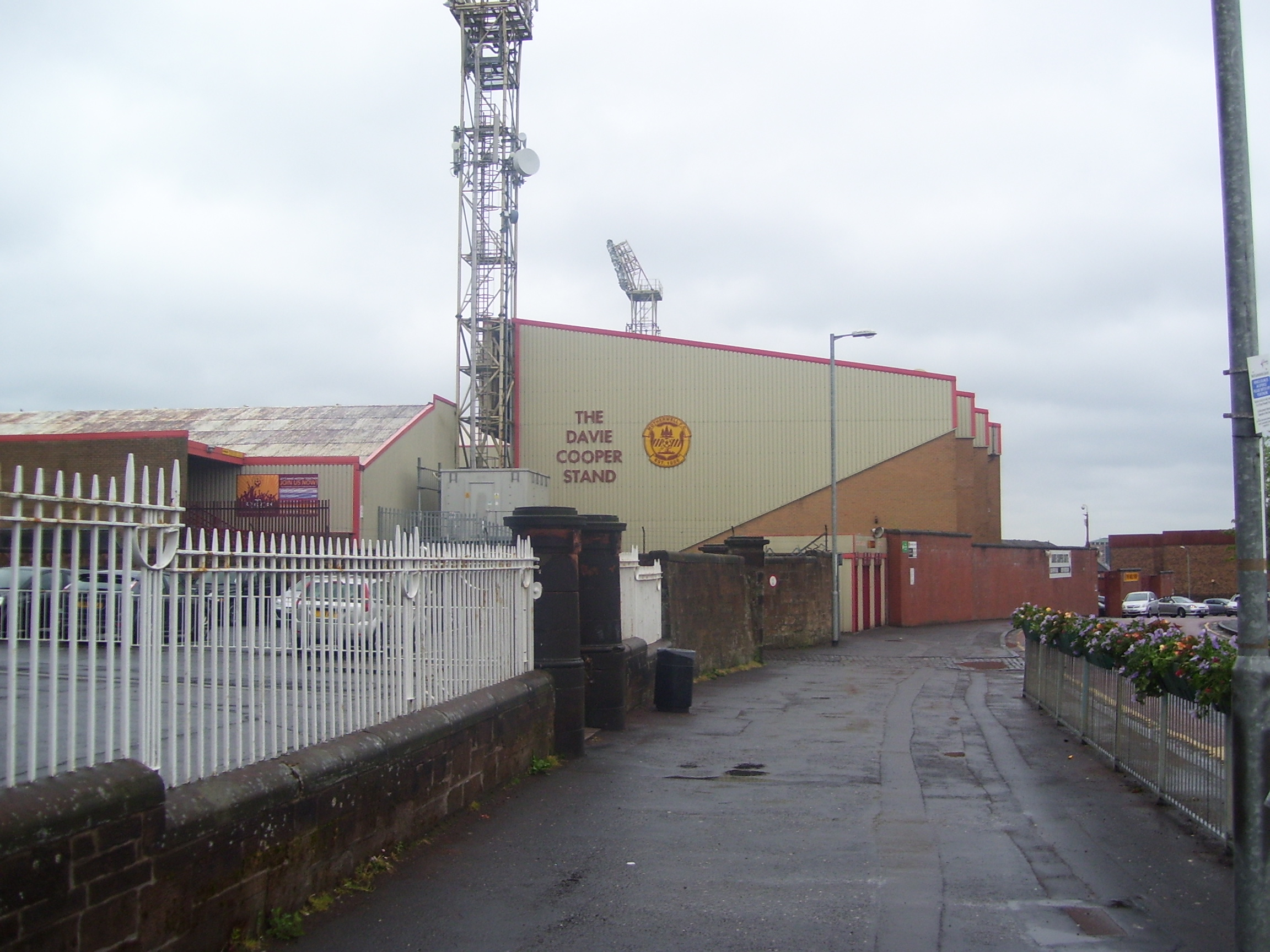
The Davie Cooper Stand at Fir Park.

After Cooper's death, Motherwell renamed Fir Park's North Stand in his honour. The 2005 Scottish League Cup Final between Rangers and Motherwell paid tribute to Cooper's memory. Ticket stubs had an image of him printed on them, and a percentage of the programme sales went towards establishing a centre for special needs children.

In 1999, four years after Cooper's death, a statue of the player was erected in his honour at the Hamilton Palace Sports and Recreation Grounds. The bronze statue was created by artist Kenny Mackay and erected by South Lanarkshire Council. Ally McCoist and Rangers ambassador Mark Hateley laid a wreath at the statue in March 2020, 25 years after Cooper's death in memory of the player.

== Career statistics ==
=== International ===
Appearances and goals by national team and year
National team	Year	Apps	Goals
Scotland	1979	2	0
Scotland	1984	5	2
Scotland	1985	6	2
Scotland	1986	5	2
Scotland	1987	2	0
Scotland	1989	1	0
Scotland	1990	1	0
Total		22	6

Scores and results list Scotland's goal tally first.

#	Date	Venue	Opponent	Score	Result	Competition
1	28 February 1984	Hampden Park, Glasgow, Scotland	Wales	1–0	2–1	British Home Championship
2	12 September 1984	Hampden Park, Glasgow, Scotland	Yugoslavia	1–0	6–1	Friendly match
3	10 September 1985	Ninian Park, Cardiff, Wales	Wales	1–1	1–1	1986 FIFA World Cup qualifying
4	20 November 1985	Hampden Park, Glasgow, Scotland	Australia	1–0	2–0	1986 FIFA World Cup play-off
5	12 November 1986	Hampden Park, Glasgow, Scotland	Luxembourg	1–0	3–0	UEFA Euro 1988 qualifying
6	12 November 1986	Hampden Park, Glasgow, Scotland	Luxembourg	2–0	3–0	UEFA Euro 1988 qualifying

== Honours ==
Clydebank

- Scottish Second Division: 1975–76

Rangers

- Scottish Premier Division: 1977–78, 1986–87, 1988–89
- Scottish Cup: 1977–78, 1978–79, 1980–81
- Scottish League Cup: 1977–78, 1978–79, 1981–82, 1983–84, 1984–85, 1986–87, 1987–88

Motherwell

- Scottish Cup: 1990–91

Individual

- Scottish Football Hall of Fame
- Rangers Greatest Ever Team – 1999 Poll

Other

- Tennents' Sixes: 1984, 1989

== See also ==
- List of footballers in Scotland by number of league appearances (500+)
