= 1987 Tennent's Sixes =

1986–87 Tennent's Sixes
Tournament details
- Country: Scotland
- Venue(s): Scottish Exhibition and Conference Centre, Glasgow
- Dates: 18 and 19 January 1987
- Teams: 12

Final positions
- Champions: Aberdeen
- Runners-up: Heart of Midlothian

Tournament statistics
- Matches played: 19
- Goals scored: 107 (5.63 per match)
- Top goal scorer: John Robertson (10)

The 1987 Tennents' Sixes was the fourth staging of the indoor 6-a-side football tournament. For the second time it was held at the Scottish Exhibition and Conference Centre (SECC) in Glasgow on 18 and 19 January.

There were 4 groups of 3, with all clubs drawn from the 1986–87 Scottish Premier Division season.

The two group winners and runners-up qualified to the quarter-finals and Aberdeen beat Heart of Midlothian 4–3 in the final.

== Group stage ==
=== Group 1 ===
Team	Pld	W	L	GF	GA	GD	Pts
Aberdeen	2	2	0	10	2	7	4
Hamilton Academical	2	1	1	6	7	-1	2
Hibernian	2	0	2	3	9	-6	0

Home team	Score	Away team	Date
Aberdeen	5–1	Hamilton Academical	18 January 1987
Hamilton Academical	5–2	Hibernian	18 January 1987
Aberdeen	4–1	Hibernian	18 January 1987

=== Group 2 ===
Team	Pld	W	L	GF	GA	GD	Pts
Dundee	2	2	0	7	5	2	4
Motherwell	2	1	1	6	5	1	2
Rangers	2	0	2	5	8	-3	0

Home team	Score	Away team	Date
Dundee	4–3	Rangers	18 January 1987
Motherwell	4–2	Rangers	18 January 1987
Dundee	3–2	Motherwell	18 January 1987

=== Group 3 ===
Team	Pld	W	L	GF	GA	GD	Pts
Heart of Midlothian	2	2	0	10	6	4	4
Dundee United	2	1	1	7	7	0	2
Clydebank	2	0	2	4	8	-4	0

Home team	Score	Away team	Date
Heart of Midlothian	5–2	Clydebank	18 January 1987
Dundee United	3–2	Clydebank	18 January 1987
Heart of Midlothian	5–4	Dundee United	18 January 1987

=== Group 4 ===
Team	Pld	W	L	GF	GA	GD	Pts
Celtic	2	2	0	9	3	6	4
Falkirk	2	1	1	3	7	-4	2
St Mirren	2	0	2	4	6	-2	0

Home team	Score	Away team	Date
Celtic	6–0	Falkirk	18 January 1987
Falkirk	3–1	St Mirren	18 January 1987
Celtic	3–3	St Mirren	18 January 1987

== Quarter-finals ==
19 January 1987

Aberdeen	3 – 1	Falkirk

Scottish Exhibition and Conference Centre, Glasgow

19 January 1987

Dundee	2 – 1	Dundee United

Scottish Exhibition and Conference Centre, Glasgow

19 January 1987

Heart of Midlothian	3 – 3	Motherwell

Scottish Exhibition and Conference Centre, Glasgow

19 January 1987

Hamilton Academical	3 – 1	Celtic

Scottish Exhibition and Conference Centre, Glasgow

== Semi-finals ==
19 January 1987

Aberdeen	1 – 0	Hamilton Academical

Scottish Exhibition and Conference Centre, Glasgow

19 January 1987

Heart of Midlothian	8 – 1	Dundee

Scottish Exhibition and Conference Centre, Glasgow

== Final ==
Aberdeen beat Hearts to win the tournament again.

19 January 1987

Aberdeen	4 - 3	Heart of Midlothian
Wright; Simpson		Mackay; Robertson

Scottish Exhibition and Conference Centre, Glasgow
Attendance: 5200

== Prize money ==
A breakdown of prize money from the tournament sponsors.

Prize money	Amount
Tournament participation	£8,000
Losing quarter-finalists	£500
Losing semi-finalists	£1,000
Losing finalists	£1,500
Tournament winners	£3,000
Highest scoring team	£1,000

== Events and incidents ==
- The trophy was presented to Ian Porterfield and Alex McLeish as the respective winning manager and captain of Aberdeen.
