= 1986 Tennent's Sixes =

1985-86 Tennent's Sixes
Tournament details
- Country: Scotland
- Venue(s): Scottish Exhibition and Conference Centre, Glasgow
- Dates: 19 and 20 January 1986
- Teams: 10

Final positions
- Champions: Aberdeen
- Runners-up: St Mirren

Tournament statistics
- Matches played: 23
- Goals scored: 49 (2.13 per match)

The 1986 Tennents' Sixes was the third staging of the indoor 6-a-side football tournament. This time it was held at the Scottish Exhibition and Conference Centre (SECC) in Glasgow on 19 and 20 January and shown on BBC Scotland.

There were 2 groups of 5, with teams from the 1985–86 Scottish Premier Division season, except Celtic and Rangers. First Division club Dumbarton and English club Manchester City replaced them.

The two group winners and runners-up qualified to the semi-finals and Aberdeen beat St Mirren 3–0 in the final.

== Group stage ==
=== Group 1 ===
Team	Pld	W	L	GF	GA	GD	Pts
St Mirren	4	3	1	6	3	3	6
Dumbarton	4	3	1	5	3	2	6
Dundee	4	3	1	5	3	2	6
Heart of Midlothian	4	1	3	3	6	-3	2
Manchester City	4	1	3	4	10	-6	2

Home team	Score	Away team	Date
Manchester City	2–1	Heart of Midlothian	19 January 1986
Dumbarton	1–0	St Mirren	19 January 1986
Dundee	1–1	Heart of Midlothian	19 January 1986
St Mirren	2–1	Manchester City	19 January 1986
Dumbarton	0–0	Dundee	19 January 1986
St Mirren	3–1	Heart of Midlothian	19 January 1986
Dumbarton	4–0	Manchester City	19 January 1986
St Mirren	1–0	Dundee	19 January 1986
Dumbarton	0–3	Heart of Midlothian	20 January 1986
Dundee	4–1	Manchester City	20 January 1986

=== Group 2 ===
Team	Pld	W	L	GF	GA	GD	Pts
Aberdeen	4	3	1	6	2	4	6
Hibernian	4	3	1	2	1	1	6
Clydebank	4	3	1	4	2	2	6
Dundee United	4	1	3	4	6	-2	2
Motherwell	4	0	4	3	5	-2	0

Home team	Score	Away team	Date
Clydebank	2–1	Dundee United	19 January 1986
Aberdeen	0–0	Hibernian	19 January 1986
Clydebank	1–1	Motherwell	19 January 1986
Hibernian	2–0	Dundee United	19 January 1986
Aberdeen	2–0	Clydebank	19 January 1986
Dundee United	2–1	Motherwell	19 January 1986
Clydebank	1–0	Hibernian	19 January 1986
Aberdeen	2–1	Motherwell	19 January 1986
Aberdeen	2–1	Dundee United	20 January 1986
Hibernian	0–0	Motherwell	20 January 1986

== Semi-finals ==
20 January 1986

Aberdeen	1 – 0	Dumbarton

Scottish Exhibition and Conference Centre, Glasgow

20 January 1986

St Mirren	3 – 0	Hibernian

Scottish Exhibition and Conference Centre, Glasgow

== Final ==
Aberdeen beat St Mirren to win the tournament for the first time.

20 January 1986

Aberdeen	3 - 0	St Mirren
McMaster; Porteous

Scottish Exhibition and Conference Centre, Glasgow
Attendance: 5200

== Incidents and events ==
- The trophy was presented to Alex Ferguson and Billy Stark as the respective winning manager and captain of Aberdeen.
- The officiating came under scrutiny for sin binning three Dumbarton players in the semi-final and two St Mirren players in the final. Both matches were against Aberdeen.
