= 1985 Tennent's Sixes =

1984-85 Tennent's Sixes
Tournament details
- Country: Scotland
- Venue(s): Ingliston Showground, Edinburgh
- Dates: 20 and 21 January 1985
- Teams: 10

Final positions
- Champions: Heart of Midlothian
- Runners-up: Morton

Tournament statistics
- Matches played: 23
- Goals scored: 91 (3.96 per match)

The 1985 Tennents' Sixes was the second staging of the indoor 6-a-side football tournament at Ingliston Showground near Edinburgh on 20 and 21 January. It was again televised on BBC Scotland.

The format had changed from 3 groups of 3 teams to 2 groups of 10 with all from the 1984–85 Scottish Premier Division season except Celtic. First Division club Airdrieonians replaced them.

The two group winners and runners-up qualified to the semi-finals and Hearts beat Morton 4–1 in the final.

== Group stage ==
=== Group 1 ===
Team	Pld	W	L	GF	GA	GD	Pts
Dundee	4	3	1	9	5	4	6
Morton	4	3	1	10	7	3	6
Rangers	4	2	2	10	9	1	4
Hibernian	4	1	3	5	6	-1	2
St Mirren	4	1	3	6	9	-3	2

Home team	Score	Away team	Date
Morton	3–1	Dundee	20 January 1985
Dundee	3–1	Rangers	20 January 1985
Dundee	3–0	Hibernian	20 January 1985
Rangers	4–3	Morton	20 January 1985
Morton	2–1	Hibernian	20 January 1985
Morton	2–1	St Mirren	20 January 1985
St Mirren	3–1	Rangers	20 January 1985
Hibernian	4–1	St Mirren	20 January 1985
Dundee	2–1	St Mirren	21 January 1985
Rangers	4–0	Hibernian	21 January 1985

=== Group 2 ===
Team	Pld	W	L	GF	GA	GD	Pts
Aberdeen	2	2	0	8	2	6	4
Heart of Midlothian	2	1	1	4	4	0	2
Dundee United	2	0	2	0	6	-6	0
Dumbarton	2	1	1	4	4	0	2
Airdrieonians	2	0	2	0	6	-6	0

Home team	Score	Away team	Date
Aberdeen	4–2	Heart of Midlothian	20 January 1985
Aberdeen	2–1	Dumbarton	20 January 1985
Aberdeen	4–2	Airdrieonians	20 January 1985
Heart of Midlothian	1–1	Dundee United	20 January 1985
Airdrieonians	2–1	Heart of Midlothian	20 January 1985
Dundee United	2–1	Dumbarton	20 January 1985
Dundee United	5–1	Airdrieonians	20 January 1985
Dumbarton	2–1	Airdrieonians	20 January 1985
Aberdeen	0–0	Dundee United	21 January 1985
Heart of Midlothian	3–0	Dumbarton	21 January 1985

== Semi-finals ==
21 January 1985

Morton	5 – 1	Aberdeen

Ingliston Showground, Edinburgh

21 January 1985

Heart of Midlothian	4 – 1	Dundee

Ingliston Showground, Edinburgh

== Final ==
Hearts beat Morton to win the tournament for the first time.

21 January 1985

Heart of Midlothian	4 - 1	Morton
Robertson; Bone

Ingliston Showground, Edinburgh

== Prize money ==
A breakdown of the prize money from the tournament sponsors.

Prize money	Amount
Tournament participation	£3,500
Losing semi-finalists	£1,500
Losing finalists	£2,500
Tournament winners	£3,500
Highest scorers	£400
2nd highest scorers	£300

- Tennents also promised £1,000 to be awarded to charity if the total number of goals broke the 100 barrier.
