= 1993 Tennent's Sixes =

1992-93 Tennent's Sixes
Tournament details
- Country: Scotland
- Venue(s): Scottish Exhibition and Conference Centre, Glasgow
- Dates: 24 and 25 January 1993
- Teams: 10

Final positions
- Champions: Partick Thistle
- Runners-up: Airdrieonians

Tournament statistics
- Top goal scorer: Owen Coyle (9 goals)

The 1993 Tennents' Sixes was the tenth and final staging of the indoor 6-a-side football tournament. It was held at the Scottish Exhibition and Conference Centre (SECC) in Glasgow on 24 and 25 January.

Clubs from the 1992-93 Premier Division season competed except Rangers and Dundee and the two group winners and runners-up qualified to the semi-finals and Partick Thistle became the final Sixes winners beating Airdrieonians 4–3.

== Group 1 ==
Team	Pld	W	L	GF	GA	GD	Pts
Celtic	4	3	1	15	9	6	9
St Johnstone	4	3	1	9	6	3	9
Hibernian	4	3	1	13	11	2	9
Aberdeen	4	1	3	9	13	-4	3
Falkirk	4	0	4	8	15	-4	0

Home team	Score	Away team	Date
Celtic	3–0	St Johnstone	24 January 1993
Hibernian	2–1	Celtic	25 January 1993
Celtic	5–4	Aberdeen	24 January 1993
Celtic	5–3	Falkirk	24 January 1993
St Johnstone	3–2	Hibernian	24 January 1993
St Johnstone	3–0	Aberdeen	24 January 1993
St Johnstone	3–1	Falkirk	25 January 1993
Hibernian	4–3	Aberdeen	24 January 1993
Hibernian	5–4	Falkirk	24 January 1993
Aberdeen	2–0	Falkirk	24 January 1993

== Group 2 ==
Team	Pld	W	L	GF	GA	GD	Pts
Partick Thistle	4	3	1	12	5	7	9
Airdrieonians	4	3	1	11	8	3	9
Heart of Midlothian	4	3	1	14	13	1	9
Motherwell	4	1	3	15	17	-2	3
Dundee United	4	0	4	8	17	-9	0

Home team	Score	Away team	Date
Partick Thistle	2–0	Airdrieonians	24 January 1993
Heart of Midlothian	2–2	Partick Thistle	24 January 1993
Partick Thistle	4–3	Motherwell	25 January 1993
Partick Thistle	4–0	Dundee United	24 January 1993
Airdrieonians	3–2	Heart of Midlothian	25 January 1993
Airdrieonians	3–1	Motherwell	24 January 1993
Airdrieonians	5–3	Dundee United	24 January 1993
Heart of Midlothian	7–6	Motherwell	24 January 1993
Heart of Midlothian	3–2	Dundee United	24 January 1993
Motherwell	5–3	Dundee United	24 January 1993

== Semi-finals ==
25 January 1993

Partick Thistle	4 – 3	St Johnstone

Scottish Exhibition and Conference Centre, Glasgow

25 January 1993

Airdrieonians	4 – 3	Celtic

Scottish Exhibition and Conference Centre, Glasgow

== Final ==
25 January 1993

Partick Thistle	4 - 3	Airdrieonians
Irons; McLaughlin		Coyle; Boyle

Scottish Exhibition and Conference Centre, Glasgow
Attendance: 5200

== Prize money ==
A breakdown of the prize money from the tournament sponsors.

Prize money	Amount
Tournament participation	£13,500
Losing finalists	£2,000
Tournament winners	£4,000
Goal fund bonuses (shared out to appropriate clubs)	£15,000
Fair play bonus	£2,000

== Incidents and events ==
- Davie Irons of Partick Thistle was voted Player of the Tournament.
- Darren Jackson of Hibs' goal against Aberdeen was the 900th goal scored in the tournament's history.
- Tosh McKinlay of Hearts' goal against Airdrie was the 1000th goal scored in the tournament's history. He and Davie Cooper (scorer of the 1st ever goal) were later presented with a special quaich each.
- Partick Thistle's win over Motherwell at 7 6 was the equal highest scoring game in the competition's history.
- Huntly (Highland League Cup holders) played Vale of Leithen (from the EoSFL) in an exhibition match.
- Hibs exited the group stage in dubious fashion. Referee Bill Crombie penalized Hibs for time wasting in the Celtic match, despite Hibs being in possession of the ball with two players still in the opponents half. Celtic scored from it and as a result of that goal St Johnstone qualified at the expense of Hibs because of goal difference.
- The 1993 edition brought the sponsors Tennent Caledonian's total investment to over £3,000,000 in the history of the tournament.
