= 2026 Tennent's Sixes =

2026 edition of Scottish indoor football tournament

Tournament details
- Country: Scotland
- Venue: Braehead Arena
- Dates: 3–4 October 2026
- Teams: 12

Final positions
- Champions: Celtic
- Runners-up: Rangers

Tournament statistics
- Matches played: 25
- Goals scored: 128 (5.12 per match)
- Top goal scorer: Martyn Waghorn (10)

The 2026 Tennent's Sixes was the revival of the Tennent's Sixes, an indoor six-a-side football tournament last held in 1993. It took place at Braehead Arena on 3 and 4 October 2026, with former players representing each of the 12 clubs in the 2026–27 Scottish Premiership. The Scottish Professional Football League (SPFL) and Braehead Arena are organising the tournament, which was shown live on Premier Sports.

== Background ==
Ten editions of the original Tennent's Sixes were held between 1984 and 1993, using contemporary first-team players. Partick Thistle won the last tournament in January 1993, defeating Airdrieonians 4–3 in the final.

The SPFL announced the revival on 12 August 2026 as a legends competition involving all 12 Premiership clubs. Players will represent their former clubs while wearing the clubs' 2026–27 kits.

== Format ==
The 12 clubs were divided into three regional groups of four. The top two teams in each group and the two best third-placed sides will advance to an eight-team knockout stage.

Drawn matches will go to a penalty shoot-out, with a bonus point awarded to the winner. The sin bin will also be used.

Dundee United's announcement said the competition would mainly feature former professionals aged 35 or over. Younger players could take part if they had been retired from football for at least three full seasons.

== Teams and squads ==
The following players and team staff had been announced by 21 September 2026.

Club	Group	Manager / coach	Players announced
Aberdeen	B	Willie Garner	Tomáš Černý (GK), Richard Foster, Kevin McNaughton, Stuart Duff, Mark Kerr, Derek Young, Josh Walker, Niall McGinn, Lee Miller
Celtic	C	Tom Boyd	Barry John Corr (GK), Charlie Mulgrew, Simon Donnelly, Jonny Hayes, Joe Ledley, Derek Riordan, Aiden McGeady, Glenn Loovens,Gary Hooper
Dundee	B	Barry Smith	John Gibson (GK), Sean Higgins, Scott Robertson, Paul McGowan, Jim McAlister, Gavin Rae, Gary Irvine, Gary Harkins, Barry Smith
Dundee United	B		Paul Gallacher (GK), Prince Buaben, Craig Easton, Morgaro Gomis, Paul Dixon, Andy McLaren, Danny Swanson, Garry Kenneth, Paul Paton
Falkirk	A	Kevin McAllister	Stephen McGinn, Paddy Cregg, Darryl Duffy
Heart of Midlothian	A	Gary Locke	Roddy McKenzie (GK), Don Cowie, Christophe Berra, Colin Cameron, Thomas Flögel, David Templeton, Ryan Stevenson, Ian Black, Rudi Skácel
Hibernian	A	Scott Allan	Alan Combe (GK), Marvin Bartley, Darren McGregor, Ivan Sproule, Grant Holt, Dan Carmichael, Jamie McCluskey, Kevin Harper, Tom Taiwo
Kilmarnock	C	James Fowler (manager); Garry Hay (assistant)	Chad Harpur (GK), Craig Bryson, Liam Kelly, Jamie Hamill, Michael Nelson, James Dayton, Stevie Murray
Motherwell	A	David Clarkson	Graeme Smith (GK), Mark Reynolds, Richard Tait, Jim Paterson, Simon Ramsden, Keith Lasley, Ross McCormack, John Sutton, Jon Obika
Rangers	C	Barry Ferguson (manager); Ian Durrant (assistant)	Lee Robinson (GK), Lee McCulloch, Kris Boyd, Charlie Adam, Andy Halliday, Lewis Macleod, Dean Shiels, Alan Gow, Kirk Broadfoot
St Johnstone	B	Kieran McAnespie (coach)	Kevin Cuthbert (GK), Liam Craig, Frazer Wright, Callum Booth, Jody Morris, Cillian Sheridan, Steven Anderson, Gavin Swankie, Peter MacDonald
St Mirren	C	Hugh Murray (player-manager)	Ludovic Roy (GK), Paul Rudden, Lee Mair, Scott Walker, Barry McLaughlin, Simon Lappin, Mark Corcoran, José Quitongo

== Group stage ==
Matches were played across both sessions on Saturday 3 October and the Sunday afternoon session on 4 October. The advertised Saturday sessions ran from 13:00 to 15:30 and 16:30 to 19:00, with Sunday's remaining group matches played between 13:00 and 15:30.

Teams received three points for a win. A drawn match went to a penalty shoot-out, with the winner receiving two points and the loser one. A bonus point was awarded for scoring four or more goals. Teams level on points were ranked by goal difference.

=== Group A ===
Group A consisted of Falkirk, Motherwell, Hibernian and Heart of Midlothian.

Pos	Team	Pld	W	D	L	GF	GA	GD	Pts	Qualification
1	Motherwell	3	2	1	0	9	6	+3	8	Advance to quarter-finals
2	Falkirk	3	1	0	2	9	6	+3	4	Advance to quarter-finals
3	Hibernian	3	1	1	1	6	6	0	4	Advance as best third-placed team
4	Heart of Midlothian	3	1	0	2	2	8	−6	3	Eliminated

Home team	Score	Away team	Date
Falkirk	2-3	Motherwell	3 October 2026
Hibernian	0-1	Heart of Midlothian	3 October 2026
Falkirk	2-3	Hibernian	3 October 2026
Motherwell	3-1	Heart of Midlothian	3 October 2026
Falkirk	5-0	Heart of Midlothian	4 October 2026
Motherwell	3-3 (2-1 p)	Hibernian	4 October 2026

=== Group B ===
Group B consisted of St Johnstone, Dundee, Dundee United and Aberdeen.

Pos	Team	Pld	W	D	L	GF	GA	GD	Pts	Qualification
1	Dundee United	3	2	0	1	8	5	+3	7	Advance to quarter-finals
2	St Johnstone	3	2	0	1	3	2	+1	6	Advance to quarter-finals
3	Dundee	3	1	0	2	4	5	−1	3	Advance as best third-placed team
4	Aberdeen	3	1	0	2	3	6	−3	3	Eliminated

Home team	Score	Away team	Date
St Johnstone	1-0	Dundee	3 October 2026
Dundee United	3-2	Aberdeen	3 October 2026
St Johnstone	2-1	Dundee United	3 October 2026
Dundee	3-0	Aberdeen	3 October 2026
St Johnstone	0-1	Aberdeen	4 October 2026
Dundee	1-4	Dundee United	4 October 2026

=== Group C ===
Group C consisted of Kilmarnock, Celtic, St Mirren and Rangers.

Pos	Team	Pld	W	D	L	GF	GA	GD	Pts	Qualification
1	Rangers	3	3	0	0	19	5	+14	12	Advance to quarter-finals
2	Celtic	3	2	0	1	10	9	+1	8	Advance to quarter-finals
3	Kilmarnock	3	1	0	2	6	12	−6	3	Eliminated
4	St Mirren	3	0	0	3	5	14	−9	0	Eliminated

Home team	Score	Away team	Date
Kilmarnock	2-5	Celtic	3 October 2026
St Mirren	3-7	Rangers	3 October 2026
Kilmarnock	3-2	St Mirren	3 October 2026
Celtic	1-7	Rangers	3 October 2026
Kilmarnock	1-5	Rangers	4 October 2026
Celtic	4-0	St Mirren	4 October 2026

== Knockout stage ==
The knockout stage was played for the final session on 4 October, from 16:30 to 20:00.

=== Quarter-finals ===
The quarter-finals were played on 4 October 2026, with kick-off at 16:30.

Home team	Score	Away team	Date
Motherwell	1-1 (1-2 p)	St Johnstone	4 October 2026
Celtic	6-3	Falkirk	4 October 2026
Hibernian	2-2 (2-0 p)	Dundee United	4 October 2026
Rangers	6-2	Dundee	4 October 2026

=== Semi-finals ===
Home team	Score	Away team	Date
St Johnstone	1-6	Celtic	4 October 2026
Hibernian	1-4	Rangers	4 October 2026

=== Final ===
Home team	Score	Away team	Date
Celtic	5-4	Rangers	4 October 2026
