= 1992 Tennent's Sixes =

1991-92 Tennent's Sixes
Tournament details
- Country: Scotland
- Venue(s): Scottish Exhibition and Conference Centre, Glasgow
- Dates: 19 and 20 January 1992
- Teams: 10

Final positions
- Champions: Celtic
- Runners-up: St Johnstone

Tournament statistics
- Matches played: 23
- Goals scored: 144 (6.26 per match)
- Top goal scorer: Iain Ferguson (11 goals)

The 1992 Tennents' Sixes was the ninth staging of the indoor 6-a-side football tournament. It was held at the Scottish Exhibition and Conference Centre (SECC) in Glasgow on 19 and 20 January.

Clubs from the 1991–92 Premier Division season competed except Rangers and Aberdeen and the two group winners and runners-up qualified to the semi-finals and Celtic won their only Sixes title beating St Johnstone 4–2.

== Group 1 ==
Team	Pld	W	L	GF	GA	GD	Pts
Celtic	4	4	0	17	8	9	8
St Johnstone	4	3	1	16	11	5	6
Falkirk	4	2	2	13	13	0	4
Partick Thistle	4	1	3	8	14	-6	2
Dundee United	4	0	4	9	17	-8	0

Home team	Score	Away team	Date
Celtic	3–3	St Johnstone	20 January 1992
Celtic	5–3	Falkirk	19 January 1992
Celtic	4–0	Partick Thistle	19 January 1992
Celtic	5–2	Dundee United	19 January 1992
St Johnstone	6–4	Falkirk	19 January 1992
St Johnstone	4–1	Partick Thistle	19 January 1992
St Johnstone	3–3	Dundee United	19 January 1992
Falkirk	3–1	Partick Thistle	19 January 1992
Falkirk	3–1	Dundee United	19 January 1992
Partick Thistle	6–3	Dundee United	20 January 1992

== Group 2 ==
Team	Pld	W	L	GF	GA	GD	Pts
Heart of Midlothian	4	4	0	18	6	12	8
Motherwell	4	3	1	13	8	5	6
St Mirren	4	1	3	9	13	-4	2
Airdrieonians	4	1	3	10	15	-5	2
Hibernian	4	1	3	7	15	-8	2

Home team	Score	Away team	Date
Heart of Midlothian	2–1	Motherwell	19 January 1992
Heart of Midlothian	3–2	St Mirren	19 January 1992
Heart of Midlothian	5–2	Airdrieonians	20 January 1992
Heart of Midlothian	8–1	Hibernian	19 January 1992
Motherwell	3–1	St Mirren	19 January 1992
Motherwell	5–3	Airdrieonians	19 January 1992
Motherwell	4–2	Hibernian	20 January 1992
Airdrieonians	5–3	St Mirren	19 January 1992
St Mirren	3–2	Hibernian	19 January 1992
Hibernian	2–0	Airdrieonians	19 January 1992

== Semi-finals ==
20 January 1992

Celtic	8 – 5	Motherwell

Scottish Exhibition and Conference Centre, Glasgow

20 January 1992

St Johnstone	3 – 2	Heart of Midlothian

Scottish Exhibition and Conference Centre, Glasgow

== Final ==
Celtic beat St Johnstone to win the tournament for the only time.

20 January 1992

Celtic	4 - 2	St Johnstone
Cascarino; Collins; Creaney; Miller		Grant

Scottish Exhibition and Conference Centre, Glasgow
Attendance: 7500

== Other moments ==
- Ross County (Highland League Cup holders) played Bannockburn (Scottish Amateur Cup holders) in an exhibition match.
