= 1991 Tennent's Sixes =

1990–91 Tennent's Sixes
Tournament details
- Country: Scotland
- Venue(s): Scottish Exhibition and Conference Centre, Glasgow
- Dates: 20 and 21 January 1991
- Teams: 10

Final positions
- Champions: Heart of Midlothian
- Runners-up: Motherwell

Tournament statistics
- Matches played: 23
- Goals scored: 143 (6.22 per match)
- Top goal scorer(s): (8) John Colquhoun, Graham Harvey

The 1991 Tennents' Sixes was the eighth staging of the indoor 6-a-side football tournament. It was held at the Scottish Exhibition and Conference Centre (SECC) in Glasgow on 20 and 21 January.

Clubs from the 1990–91 Scottish Premier Division season competed, except Rangers who were replaced by First Division side Airdrieonains. The two group winners and runners-up qualified to the semi-finals; in the final Hearts beat Motherwell 5–2 to win their second Sixes title (a year after Edinburgh rivals Hibernian won the tournament).

== Group 1 ==
Team	Pld	W	L	GF	GA	GD	Pts
Motherwell	4	3	1	13	9	4	6
St Johnstone	4	3	1	9	13	-4	6
Hibernian	4	2	2	12	11	1	4
Dundee United	4	2	2	11	12	-1	4
Celtic	4	1	3	12	12	0	2

Home team	Score	Away team	Date
Motherwell	5–0	St Johnstone	20 January 1991
Motherwell	4–3	Hibernian	20 January 1991
Dundee United	6–2	Motherwell	20 January 1991
Motherwell	2–0	Celtic	20 January 1991
St Johnstone	2–0	Hibernian	20 January 1991
St Johnstone	2–2	Dundee United	20 January 1991
St Johnstone	5–5	Celtic	20 January 1991
Hibernian	4–2	Dundee United	20 January 1991
Hibernian	4–3	Celtic	20 January 1991
Celtic	4–1	Dundee United	20 January 1991

== Group 2 ==
Team	Pld	W	L	GF	GA	GD	Pts
Heart of Midlothian	4	3	1	20	9	11	6
Airdrieonians	4	2	2	17	17	0	6
St Mirren	4	2	2	11	13	-2	4
Dunfermline Athletic	4	2	2	11	14	-3	4
Aberdeen	4	1	3	6	12	-6	2

Home team	Score	Away team	Date
Airdrieonians	5–4	Heart of Midlothian	20 January 1991
Heart of Midlothian	6–1	St Mirren	20 January 1991
Heart of Midlothian	4–2	Dunfermline Athletic	20 January 1991
Heart of Midlothian	6–1	Aberdeen	20 January 1991
St Mirren	6–5	Airdrieonians	20 January 1991
Airdrieonians	5–5	Dunfermline Athletic	20 January 1991
Airdrieonians	2–2	Aberdeen	20 January 1991
St Mirren	3–1	Dunfermline Athletic	20 January 1991
Aberdeen	1–1	St Mirren	20 January 1991
Dunfermline Athletic	3–2	Aberdeen	20 January 1991

== Semi-finals ==
21 January 1991

Heart of Midlothian	3 – 3	St Johnstone

Scottish Exhibition and Conference Centre, Glasgow

21 January 1991

Motherwell	5 – 3	Airdrieonians

Scottish Exhibition and Conference Centre, Glasgow

== Final ==
Hearts beat Motherwell to win the tournament again. Joe Jordan was the respective winning manager of Hearts.

21 January 1991

Heart of Midlothian	5 - 2	Motherwell
Colquhoun; McKinlay; Wright

Scottish Exhibition and Conference Centre, Glasgow
Attendance: 5200

== Prize money ==
A breakdown of the prize money from the tournament sponsors.

Prize money	Amount
Tournament participation	£12,000
Losing semi-finalists	£1,000
Losing finalists	£2,000
Tournament winners	£4,000
Various goalscoring targets (shared out to appropriate clubs)	£10,000

== Other moments ==
- SFA introduced a rule change. A team must keep a minimum of two players instead of one in opposition half. It was to encourage more goals being scored.
- Elgin City (Highland League Cup holders) played St Patrick's ( Scotland Amateur Cup holders) in an exhibition match.
