= 1989 Tennent's Sixes =

1988–89 Tennent's Sixes
Tournament details
- Country: Scotland
- Venue(s): Scottish Exhibition and Conference Centre, Glasgow
- Dates: 22 and 23 January 1988
- Teams: 10

Final positions
- Champions: Rangers
- Runners-up: Motherwell

Tournament statistics
- Matches played: 23
- Goals scored: 90 (3.91 per match)

The 1989 Tennents' Sixes was the sixth staging of the indoor 6-a-side football tournament. For the fourth time it was held at the Scottish Exhibition and Conference Centre (SECC) in Glasgow on 22 and 23 January.

The format had been reverted to 2 groups of five as the number of Premier Division clubs had been reduced to 10 at the start of the 1988–89 season and all the clubs from the tier competed.

The two group winners and runners-up qualified to the semi-finals which included the Old Firm playing together and Rangers beat Motherwell 2–1 in the final to win their second Sixes title.

== Group 1 ==
Team	Pld	W	L	GF	GA	GD	Pts
Celtic	4	3	1	12	9	3	6
St Mirren	4	3	1	9	6	3	6
Hamilton Academical	4	2	2	13	7	6	4
Dundee	4	2	2	8	13	-5	4
Aberdeen	4	0	4	7	14	-7	0

Home team	Score	Away team	Date
Celtic	3–3	Dundee	22 January 1989
Hamilton Academical	4–2	Aberdeen	22 January 1989
Dundee	2–1	St Mirren	22 January 1989
Celtic	2–1	Hamilton Academical	22 January 1989
St Mirren	3–1	Aberdeen	22 January 1989
Hamilton Academical	7–1	Dundee	22 January 1989
Celtic	5–2	Aberdeen	22 January 1989
St Mirren	2–1	Hamilton Academical	22 January 1989
Dundee	2–2	Aberdeen	23 January 1989
St Mirren	1–0	Celtic	23 January 1989

== Group 2 ==
Team	Pld	W	L	GF	GA	GD	Pts
Motherwell	4	3	1	9	6	3	6
Rangers	4	3	1	7	6	1	6
Hibernian	4	2	2	9	8	1	4
Dundee United	4	1	3	6	8	-2	2
Heart of Midlothian	4	1	3	4	7	-3	2

Home team	Score	Away team	Date
Hibernian	3–1	Dundee United	22 January 1989
Heart of Midlothian	1–1	Motherwell	22 January 1989
Rangers	2–2	Dundee United	22 January 1989
Hibernian	2–2	Heart of Midlothian	22 January 1989
Motherwell	2–1	Dundee United	22 January 1989
Rangers	2–1	Hibernian	22 January 1989
Dundee United	2–1	Heart of Midlothian	22 January 1989
Motherwell	3–1	Rangers	22 January 1989
Motherwell	3–3	Hibernian	23 January 1989
Rangers	2–0	Heart of Midlothian	23 January 1989

== Semi-finals ==
23 January 1989
20:40

Rangers	3 – 1	Celtic

Scottish Exhibition and Conference Centre, Glasgow

23 January 1989
21:05

Motherwell	3 – 0	St Mirren

Scottish Exhibition and Conference Centre, Glasgow

== Final ==
Rangers beat Motherwell to win the tournament again.

23 January 1989
21:55

Rangers	2 - 1	Motherwell
Cooper; Spencer		Philliben

Scottish Exhibition and Conference Centre, Glasgow
Attendance: 5200

== Incidents and events ==
- Keith (Highland League Cup holders) played Coatbridge Amateurs (Scottish Amateur Cup holders) in a specially arranged challenge match before the final.
