= Tennent's Sixes =

Scottish indoor football tournament

- Founded: 1984
- Region: Scotland
- Teams: 9–12 (1984–1993); 12 (2026)
- Current champions: Celtic
- Most championships: Aberdeen, Celtic, Heart of Midlothian, Rangers (twice each)
- Broadcaster(s): BBC Scotland; Scottish Television; Premier Sports
- 2026 Tennent's Sixes

The Tennent's Sixes is an indoor football tournament involving Scottish football clubs. The competition was held annually from 1984 until 1993 and was mainly contested by clubs from the top division, although teams from the lower divisions and England also took part. It was organised by the Scottish Football Association and sponsored by Tennent Caledonian Breweries. The field ranged from nine to 12 teams, and the format and playing rules varied between editions. The original competition ended after the 1993 edition when Tennent Caledonian Breweries withdrew its sponsorship.

In 2026, the Scottish Professional Football League (SPFL) announced that the competition would return as a tournament for former players. Teams representing all 12 clubs in the 2026–27 Scottish Premiership entered the revived event, which took place at Braehead Arena on 3 and 4 October 2026, matches were shown live by Premier Sports.

== History ==
=== 1984–1986 ===
The first Tennent's Sixes was held at Coasters Arena in Falkirk on 16 and 17 January 1984. Nine of the ten clubs in the Scottish Football League Premier Division took part, with Aberdeen absent. Each club received £3,000 for appearing, and the tournament was shown on BBC Scotland. The teams were divided into three groups of three, with the group winners and best runner-up reaching the semi-finals. Rangers beat Dundee 6–4 in the final.

The tournament moved to Ingliston Showground near Edinburgh in 1985, and then to the Scottish Exhibition and Conference Centre (SECC) in Glasgow in 1986. The SECC hosted every remaining tournament in the original run. Clubs from outside the top division also took part. Dumbarton appeared in 1986, as did English club Manchester City. Aberdeen won the 1986 tournament, beating St Mirren 3–0 in the final.

=== 1987–1989 ===
The Premier Division expanded to 12 clubs for the 1986–87 season, and all 12 took part in the 1987 Sixes. The larger field was split into four groups of three, with eight clubs progressing to the quarter-finals. Aberdeen retained the trophy, beating Hearts 4–3 in the final.

Rangers declined to take part in 1988 and were replaced by Nottingham Forest, managed by Brian Clough. Dundee won the tournament, beating Motherwell 3–2. More than 22,000 spectators attended the three sessions at the SECC, with coverage also shown on Scotsport.

The Premier Division returned to ten clubs in 1989 and the tournament reverted to two groups of five. Rangers returned and won their second title, beating Motherwell 2–1. A separate challenge match was also introduced that year, with Highland League Cup holders Keith beating Coatbridge Amateurs 3–1 before the main final.

=== 1990–1993 ===
Rangers and Aberdeen were both absent in 1992, along with Dunfermline Athletic.

Further rule changes were introduced in 1991. A win in normal time became worth three points while a victory after a penalty shoot-out was worth two, and teams were required to keep two players in the opposition half rather than one. A £10,000 goalscoring fund and £2,000 Fair Play bonus were also introduced.

Tennent Caledonian Breweries withdrew its sponsorship after the 1993 tournament, bringing the original run to an end. Partick Thistle won the final tournament, beating Airdrieonians 4–3. The club retained the Tennent's Sixes trophy, which remains in the trophy room at Firhill Stadium.

=== 2026 revival ===
The SPFL announced the return of the Tennent's Sixes in August 2026, 33 years after the previous tournament. The revived competition will use squads of former players rather than the current first-team players who competed in the original tournament.

All 12 clubs in the 2026–27 Scottish Premiership entered teams for the event at Braehead Arena on 3 and 4 October. Premier Sports is scheduled to broadcast the matches live.

For the group stage, the clubs will be split into three regional groups of four. The winner and runner-up from each group will qualify for the knockout rounds, along with the two best third-placed sides. Drawn matches will be decided by a penalty shoot-out, with a bonus point awarded to the shoot-out winner. The sin bin, a feature of the original tournament, will also return.

The SPFL began announcing squads in September 2026, with former players listed for each of the 12 participating clubs.

== Format and rules ==
The format and rules changed during the tournament's original run. Six players from each team could be on the playing area at one time, with substitutes allowed to enter and re-enter during a match. The standard squad size was ten players in 1987, although disruption to the league programme caused by severe weather led the Scottish Football Association to allow clubs to name up to 14 recognised first-team players for that year's tournament. By 1991, squads consisted of 12 players.

The playing area was surrounded by perimeter walls, and the ball remained in play unless it went over the wall or play was stopped by an official. The goals used conventional net structures. There was no offside rule. Two yellow lines divided the pitch into three zones. Under the "Three Line Rule", the ball could not be played directly from one scoring zone to the other without bouncing or being touched in the central zone.

A marked area in front of each goal was reserved for the goalkeeper. A defender deliberately entering that area conceded a penalty, while an attacking player doing so resulted in an indirect free kick. Goalkeepers could handle the ball elsewhere within the penalty area, but holding the ball for more than five seconds was a cautionable offence.

The tournament also required attacking players to remain in the opposition half. In 1987 the "Sixth Man" rule required at least one player to remain there within five seconds of play restarting. From 1991, the renamed "Fifth Man" rule required two players in the opposition half.

A yellow card resulted in a two-minute spell in the sin bin, during which the player could not be replaced. A player shown a red card could not be replaced and received an automatic one-match suspension. Deliberately kicking the ball over the perimeter wall was also treated as a cautionable offence.

Competition formats also varied. In 1987 the 12 clubs were divided into four groups of three, with the top two in each group reaching the quarter-finals. All matches lasted 20 minutes and wins were worth two points. Drawn matches were decided by penalty kicks. By 1991 there were two groups of five, with the top two reaching the semi-finals. Group matches lasted 15 minutes and the semi-finals and final lasted 20 minutes. A normal-time win was worth three points, while a victory after a penalty shoot-out was worth two.

== Controversies ==
The use of the sin bin came under scrutiny during the 1986 tournament. Three Dumbarton players were sent to the sin bin during their 1–0 semi-final defeat by Aberdeen, while two St Mirren players were sin-binned during Aberdeen's 3–0 win in the final.

In 1990, Rangers were reported to have breached tournament rules requiring first-team representation by selecting only four first-team players. Rangers and Aberdeen subsequently forfeited their appearance money after sending depleted squads to the tournament.

Hibernian's elimination from the 1993 tournament was also disputed. During their group match against Celtic, referee Bill Crombie penalised Hibs for time-wasting while they were in possession and had two players in the opposition half. Celtic scored following the decision, and Hibs were later eliminated on goal difference behind St Johnstone.

== Winners ==
Year	Winners	Runners-up	Score
1984	Rangers	Dundee	6–4
1985	Heart of Midlothian	Morton	4–1
1986	Aberdeen	St Mirren	3–0
1987	Aberdeen	Heart of Midlothian	4–3
1988	Dundee	Motherwell	3–2
1989	Rangers	Motherwell	2–1
1990	Hibernian	St Mirren	2–0
1991	Heart of Midlothian	Motherwell	5–2
1992	Celtic	St Johnstone	4–2
1993	Partick Thistle	Airdrieonians	4–3
2026	Celtic	Rangers	5–4

== Challenge Trophy ==
A separate challenge match was staged before the main final from 1989 to 1993, involving clubs outside the Scottish Football League. The early matches paired the holders of the Highland League Cup with the holders of the Scottish Amateur Cup. In 1991, for example, Elgin City entered as Highland League Cup holders and St Patrick's Dumbarton as Scottish Amateur Cup holders.

Year	Winners	Runners-up	Score
1989	Keith	Coatbridge Amateurs	3–1
1990	Norton House	Peterhead	2–1
1991	Elgin City	St Patrick's Dumbarton	9–6
1992	Ross County	Bannockburn Amateurs	2–1
1993	Vale of Leithen	Huntly	10–5

== Records and statistics ==
Aberdeen, Celtic, Heart of Midlothian and Rangers share the record for the most Tennent's Sixes titles, with two each. Motherwell reached the final three times, in 1988, 1989 and 1991, without winning the tournament.

Davie Cooper of Rangers scored the first goal in the tournament's history, against St Johnstone during the inaugural competition in 1984.

Two further scoring milestones were reached during the final original tournament in 1993. Darren Jackson of Hibernian scored the 900th goal, against Aberdeen, while Tosh McKinlay of Hearts scored the 1,000th against Airdrieonians. McKinlay and Cooper were subsequently presented with commemorative quaichs recognising the first and 1,000th goals.

== See also ==
- Masters football
