= 1998–99 Scottish Second Division =

Scottish Second Division
- Season: 1998–99
- Champions: Livingston
- Promoted: Livingston; Inverness Caledonian Thistle
- Relegated: East Fife; Forfar Athletic

The 1998–99 Scottish Second Division was won by Livingston who, along with second placed Inverness Caledonian Thistle, were promoted to the First Division. East Fife and Forfar Athletic were relegated to the Third Division.

== Table ==
Pos	Team	Pld	W	D	L	GF	GA	GD	Pts	Promotion or relegation
1	Livingston (C, P)	36	22	11	3	64	35	+29	77	Promotion to the First Division
2	Inverness CT (P)	36	21	9	6	80	48	+32	72	Promotion to the First Division
3	Clyde	36	15	8	13	46	42	+4	53	
4	Queen of the South	36	13	9	14	50	45	+5	48	
5	Alloa Athletic	36	13	7	16	65	56	+9	46	
6	Stirling Albion	36	12	8	16	50	63	−13	44	
7	Arbroath	36	12	8	16	37	52	−15	44	
8	Partick Thistle	36	12	7	17	36	45	−9	43	
9	East Fife (R)	36	12	6	18	42	64	−22	42	Relegation to the Third Division
10	Forfar Athletic (R)	36	8	7	21	48	68	−20	31	Relegation to the Third Division

Source: "1998-1999 Second Division - SPFL Archive". SPFL.
Rules for classification: 1) points; 2) goal difference; 3) number of goals scored.
(C) Champions; (P) Promoted; (R) Relegated
