= 2002–03 Airdrie United F.C. season =

Airdrie United
2002–03 season
- Chairman: Jim Ballantyne
- Manager: Sandy Stewart
- Stadium: Excelsior Stadium
- Scottish Second Division: Third place
- Scottish Cup: Third round
- League Cup: Third round
- Challenge Cup: Second round
- Top goalscorer: League: Jérôme Vareille (18); All: Jérôme Vareille (19)

Season 2002–03 was Airdrie United's first competitive season. They competed in the Second Division, Challenge Cup, League Cup and the Scottish Cup.

== Summary ==
Airdrie United finished third in the Second Division. They reached the third round of the Scottish Cup, the third round of the League Cup and the second round of the Scottish Challenge Cup.

== League table ==
Pos	Team	Pld	W	D	L	GF	GA	GD	Pts	Promotion or relegation
1	Raith Rovers (C, P)	36	16	11	9	53	36	+17	59	Promotion to the First Division
2	Brechin City (P)	36	16	7	13	63	59	+4	55	Promotion to the First Division
3	Airdrie United	36	14	12	10	51	44	+7	54	
4	Forfar Athletic	36	14	9	13	55	53	+2	51	
5	Berwick Rangers	36	13	10	13	43	48	−5	49	

Rules for classification: 1) points; 2) goal difference; 3) number of goals scored.
(C) Champions; (P) Promoted

== Results and fixtures ==
Win Draw Loss

=== Second Division ===
3 August 2002 SFL2	Airdrie United	1–0	Forfar Athletic	Excelsior Stadium
15:00	Docherty 79'	ESPN Report		Attendance: 2,285

10 August 2002 SFL2	Hamilton Academical	1–0	Airdrie United	New Douglas Park
15:00	Armstrong 47'	BBC Report		Attendance: 2,366

17 August 2002 SFL2	Airdrie United	2–1	Stranraer	Excelsior Stadium
15:00	Armstrong 50'; Ronald 75'	ESPN Report	Lurinsky 44'	Attendance: 1,518

24 August 2002 SFL2	Dumbarton	3–1	Airdrie United	Strathclyde Homes Stadium
15:00	Brown 29'; Dillon 51'; Collins 61'	ESPN Report	Armstrong 68'	Attendance: 1,397

31 August 2002 SFL2	Airdrie United	0–0	Cowdenbeath	Excelsior Stadium
15:00		ESPN Report		Attendance: 1,486

14 September 2002 SFL2	Raith Rovers	0–0	Airdrie United	Stark's Park
15:00		ESPN Report		Attendance: 2,028

21 September 2002 SFL2	Airdrie United	2–4	Brechin City	Excelsior Stadium
15:00	Gow 20'; Glancy 85'	ESPN Report	Templeman 7'; Grant 40', 69' (Penalty), 83'	Attendance: 1,373

28 September 2002 SFL2	Stenhousemuir	4–3	Airdrie United	Ochilview Park
15:00	Donnelly 6'; Graham 21'; Waldie 26'; Murphy 81'	ESPN Report	Vareille 63'; McKeown 74', 76'	Attendance: 803

5 October 2002 SFL2	Airdrie United	2–1	Berwick Rangers	Excelsior Stadium
15:00	McGuire 31'; Vareille 63'	ESPN Report	Forrest 7'	Attendance: 1,349

19 October 2002 SFL2	Airdrie United	0–0	Hamilton Academical	Excelsior Stadium
15:00		ESPN Report		Attendance: 1,593

26 October 2002 SFL2	Forfar Athletic	5–1	Airdrie United	Station Park
15:00	Tosh 39', 52'; Bavidge 55'; Sellars 60'; Lunan 66'	ESPN Report	McGowan 63'	Attendance: 666

2 November 2002 SFL2	Cowdenbeath	0–1	Airdrie United	Central Park
15:00		ESPN Report	Vareille 63'	Attendance: 603

9 November 2002 SFL2	Airdrie United	0–1	Dumbarton	Excelsior Stadium
15:00		ESPN Report	Flannery 70' (Penalty)	Attendance: 1,325

16 November 2002 SFL2	Airdrie United	0–0	Raith Rovers	Excelsior Stadium
15:00		ESPN Report		Attendance: 1,718

23 November 2002 SFL2	Brechin City	1–5	Airdrie United	Glebe Park
15:00	King 83'	ESPN Report	McKeown 22', 56', 79'; Wilson 32'; Vareille 65'	Attendance: 557

30 November 2002 SFL2	Berwick Rangers	2–2	Airdrie United	Shielfield Park
15:00	Wood 55', 57'	ESPN Report	McKeown 16'; Vareille 22'	Attendance: 607

14 December 2002 SFL2	Airdrie United	2–0	Stenhousemuir	Excelsior Stadium
15:00	Gow 60'; Vareille 73'	ESPN Report		Attendance: 1,179

28 December 2002 SFL2	Stranraer	2–0	Airdrie United	Stair Park
15:00	Moore 15'; Harty 17' (Penalty)	ESPN Report		Attendance: 735

1 January 2003 SFL2	Dumbarton	2–1	Airdrie United	Strathclyde Homes Stadium
15:00	Trialist 18'; Dillon 43'	ESPN Report	Vareille 90'	Attendance: 1,024

18 January 2003 SFL2	Raith Rovers	1–0	Airdrie United	Stark's Park
15:00	Smith 83'	ESPN Report		Attendance: 2,247

1 February 2003 SFL2	Airdrie United	3–0	Brechin City	Excelsior Stadium
15:00	Vareille 27'; Ronald 69', 75'	ESPN Report		Attendance: 1,247; Referee: Murray

8 February 2003 SFL2	Stenhousemuir	3–3	Airdrie United	Ochilview Park
15:00	McCormick 21'; McFarlane 28'; Coulter 65'	ESPN Report	McKeown 14', 43'; Dunn 46'	Attendance: 1,012; Referee: Mitchell

11 February 2003 SFL2	Airdrie United	1–1	Cowdenbeath	Excelsior Stadium
19:30	McAuley 80'	ESPN Report	Gordon 31'	Attendance: 1,070; Referee: Downie

25 February 2003 SFL2	Airdrie United	0–0	Forfar Athletic	Excelsior Stadium
15:00		ESPN Report		Attendance: 961; Referee: Melville

1 March 2003 SFL2	Airdrie United	3–3	Stranraer	Excelsior Stadium
15:00	McKeown 30'; Vareille 73', 77'	ESPN Report	Wright 45'; Harty 48'; Kerr 79'	Attendance: 1,187; Referee: Flemming

8 March 2003 SFL2	Airdrie United	2–1	Dumbarton	Excelsior Stadium
15:00	Gow 2'; Collins 16' (Own goal)	ESPN Report	Flannery 80'	Attendance: 1,136; Referee: McGarry

11 March 2003 SFL2	Hamilton Academical	2–1	Airdrie United	New Douglas Park
19:45	Armstrong 24', 64'	ESPN Report	McVey 21'	Attendance: 1,620; Referee: Brines

15 March 2003 SFL2	Cowdenbeath	1–2	Airdrie United	Central Park
15:00	Buchanan 73'	ESPN Report	McVey 13'; Wilson 85'	Attendance: 585; Referee: Winter

22 March 2003 SFL2	Brechin City	0–1	Airdrie United	Glebe Park
15:00		ESPN Report	McKeown 66'	Attendance: 680; Referee: Duff

28 March 2003 SFL2	Airdrie United	2–0	Berwick Rangers	Excelsior Stadium
19:45	Vareille 61'; Glancy 85'	ESPN Report		Attendance: 1,276; Referee: Smith

5 April 2003 SFL2	Airdrie United	1–1	Raith Rovers	Excelsior Stadium
15:00	Gow 38'	ESPN Report	Smith 28'	Attendance: 1,788; Referee: Brown

12 April 2003 SFL2	Berwick Rangers	0–3	Airdrie United	Shielfield Park
15:00		ESPN Report	Vareille 57', 64', 80'	Attendance: 631; Referee: Mack

19 April 2003 SFL2	Airdrie United	1–0	Stenhousemuir	Excelsior Stadium
15:00	Vareille 80'	ESPN Report		Attendance: 1,468; Referee: Murray

26 April 2003 SFL2	Forfar Athletic	1–1	Airdrie United	Station Park
15:00	Bavidge 34'	ESPN Report	Vareille 44'	Attendance: 884; Referee: Ritchie

3 May 2003 SFL2	Airdrie United	2–2	Hamilton Academical	Excelsior Stadium
15:00	Vareille 21', 49'	ESPN Report	Russell 34', 84'	Attendance: 1,960; Referee: Flemming

10 May 2003 SFL2	Stranraer	1–2	Airdrie United	Stair Park
15:00	Sharp 28'	ESPN Report	McKeown 36'; Gow 72'	Attendance: 1,325; Referee: Conroy

=== Challenge Cup ===
6 August 2002 Challenge Cup R1	Airdrie United	3–0	Raith Rovers	Excelsior Stadium
	Glancy 11'; McGuire 31'; Docherty 87'	BBC Report		Attendance: 1,649; Referee: Brines

13 August 2002 Challenge Cup R2	Berwick Rangers	2–0	Airdrie United	Shielfield Park
	Burke 11', 89'	ESPN Report		Attendance: 560; Referee: Murray

=== League Cup ===
7 September 2002 League Cup R1	Airdrie United	1–0	Elgin City	Excelsior Stadium
	Gow 87'	BBC Report		Attendance: 1,20; Referee: Smith

24 September 2002 League Cup R2	Kilmarnock	0–0 (a.e.t.) (3 – 4 p)	Airdrie United	Rugby Park
		BBC Report		Attendance: 4,150; Referee: Dallas

29 October 2002 League Cup R3	Airdrie United	1–2	Dundee United	Excelsior Stadium
	Vella 90'	BBC Report	Thompson 60' 67'	Attendance: 1,768; Referee: McDonald

=== Scottish Cup ===
14 January 2003 Scottish Cup R2	Airdrie United	1–0	Threave Rovers	Excelsior Stadium
15:00		SFA Report	Gow 18'	Attendance: 1,155; Referee: Thomson

25 January 2003 Scottish Cup R3	Airdrie United	1–1	St Johnstone	Excelsior Stadium
15:00	McGuire 45'	SFA Report	Baxter 88'	Attendance: 2,073; Referee: Ritchie

4 February 2003 Scottish Cup R3 Replay	St Johnstone	1–1 (a.e.t.) (4 – 2 p)	Airdrie United	McDiarmid Park
15:00	Connolly 34'	SFA Report	Vareille 51'	Attendance: 2,105; Referee: Ritchie

== Player statistics ==
=== Squad ===
No.	Pos	Nat	Player	Total		Second Division		Scottish Cup		League Cup		Other^{[a]}	
No.	Pos	Nat	Player	Apps	Goals	Apps	Goals	Apps	Goals	Apps	Goals	Apps	Goals
	GK	(Scotland) SCO	Mark McGeown	43	0	35	0	3	0	3	0	2	0
	GK	(Scotland) SCO	Peter Cherrie	2	0	2	0	0	0	0	0	0	0
	DF	(Scotland) SCO	Scott Wilson	12	0	12	0	0	0	0	0	0	0
	DF	(Scotland) SCO	Neil McGowan	31	1	25	1	3	0	3	0	0	0
	DF	(Scotland) SCO	Sandy Stewart	32	0	25	0	3	0	3	0	1	0
	DF	(Scotland) SCO	Jimmy Boyle	11	0	8	0	0	0	1	0	2	0
	DF	(Scotland) SCO	Darren Miller	4	0	2	0	0	0	1	0	1	0
	DF	(Scotland) SCO	Kenny Brannigan	22	0	16	0	1	0	3	0	2	0
	DF	(Malta) MLT	Simon Vella	20	1	15	0	0	0	3	1	2	0
	MF	(Scotland) SCO	Willie Wilson	31	1	24	1	3	0	2	0	2	0
	MF	(Scotland) SCO	Paul Harvey	13	0	11	0	0	0	2	0	0	0
	MF	(Scotland) SCO	Liam McVey	22	2	17	2	2	0	1	0	2	0
	MF	(Scotland) SCO	Kenny Black	1	0	1	0	0	0	0	0	0	0
	MF	(Scotland) SCO	Stephen Docherty	40	2	32	1	3	0	3	0	2	1
	MF	(Scotland) SCO	David Dunn	13	1	13	1	0	0	0	0	0	0
	MF	(Scotland) SCO	Stephen McKeown	31	11	28	11	3	0	0	0	0	0
	MF	(Scotland) SCO	David McGuire	23	3	17	1	3	1	2	0	1	1
	MF	(Scotland) SCO	Marvyn Wilson	33	1	28	1	2	0	1	0	2	0
	MF	(Scotland) SCO	Lee Gardner	29	0	24	0	2	0	1	0	2	0
	MF	(Ireland) EIR	Paul Armstrong	43	2	35	2	3	0	3	0	2	0
	FW	(Scotland) SCO	Steven McAuley	3	1	3	1	0	0	0	0	0	0
	FW	(Scotland) SCO	Alan Gow	32	7	27	5	2	1	3	1	0	0
	FW	(Scotland) SCO	Martin Glancy	24	3	20	2	0	0	2	0	2	1
	FW	(Scotland) SCO	Paul Ronald	36	3	29	3	3	0	2	0	2	0
	FW	(France) FRA	Jérôme Vareille	35	19	30	18	3	1	2	0	0	0
			Trialist	3	0	3	0	0	0	0	0	0	0

a. Includes other competitive competitions, including playoffs and the Scottish Challenge Cup.
