= 2003–04 Airdrie United F.C. season =

Airdrie United
2003–04 season
- Chairman: Jim Ballantyne
- Manager: Sandy Stewart
- Stadium: Excelsior Stadium
- Scottish Second Division: First place (Promoted)
- Scottish Cup: Third round
- League Cup: Second round
- Challenge Cup: Final (runners-up)
- Top goalscorer: League: Owen Coyle (13); All: Owen Coyle (15)

Season 2003–04 was Airdrie United's second competitive season. They competed in the Second Division, Challenge Cup, League Cup and the Scottish Cup.

== Summary ==
Airdrie United finished first in the Second Division and were promoted to the First Division. They reached the third round of the Scottish Cup, the second round of the League Cup and reached the final of the Challenge Cup. Airdrie finished Runners-up, losing 2–0 to Inverness.

== League table ==
Pos	Team	Pld	W	D	L	GF	GA	GD	Pts	Promotion or relegation
1	Airdrie United (C, P)	36	20	10	6	64	36	+28	70	Promotion to the First Division
2	Hamilton Academical (P)	36	18	8	10	70	47	+23	62	Promotion to the First Division
3	Dumbarton	36	18	6	12	56	41	+15	60	
4	Greenock Morton	36	16	11	9	66	58	+8	59	
5	Berwick Rangers	36	14	6	16	61	67	−6	48	

Source: "2003-2004 Second Division - SPFL Archive". SPFL.
Rules for classification: 1) points; 2) goal difference; 3) number of goals scored.
(C) Champions; (P) Promoted

== Results and fixtures ==
Win Draw Loss

=== Second Division ===
9 August 2003 SFL2	Greenock Morton	3–1	Airdrie United	Cappielow Park
15:00	Maisano 52'; Williams 77'; Weatherson 77' (Penalty)	ESPN Report	McKeown 11'	Attendance: 3,806

16 August 2003 SFL2	Airdrie United	1–0	Alloa Athletic	Excelsior Stadium
15:00	Vareille 90'	ESPN Report		Attendance: 1,445; Referee: Toner

23 August 2003 SFL2	Hamilton Academical	2–1	Airdrie United	New Douglas Park
15:00	Carrigan 33' (Penalty); Convery 50'	ESPN Report	Vareille 68'	Attendance: 2,007; Referee: Mack

30 August 2003 SFL2	Airdrie United	2–0	Dumbarton	Excelsior Stadium
15:00	Dunn 6'; Glancy 22'	ESPN Report		Attendance: 1,468; Referee: Allan

13 September 2003 SFL2	East Fife	3–1	Airdrie United	Bayview Stadium
15:00	McDonald 3'; Donaldson 56'; Deuchar 77'	ESPN Report	Vareille 33'	Attendance: 885; Referee: Fyfe

20 September 2003 SFL2	Airdrie United	2–1	Arbroath	Excelsior Stadium
15:00	Dunn 47'; Docherty 54'	ESPN Report	Cargill 19'	Attendance: 1,385; Referee: Flemming

27 September 2003 SFL2	Berwick Rangers	0–1	Airdrie United	Shielfield Park
15:00		ESPN Report	Gow 38'	Attendance: 732; Referee: Thompson

4 October 2003 SFL2	Forfar Athletic	1–1	Airdrie United	Station Park
15;00	Sellars 32'	ESPN Report	Gow 89'	Attendance: 650; Referee: Cassidy

11 October 2003 SFL2	Alloa Athletic	1–4	Airdrie United	Recreation Park
12:00	Janczyk 45'	ESPN Report	Docherty 33'; Roberts 36'; Gow 44'; Vareille 68'	Attendance: 636; Referee: Duff

18 October 2003 SFL2	Airdrie United	2–0	Stenhousemuir	Excelsior Stadium
15;00	Vareille 24'; McKeown 87'	ESPN Report		Attendance: 1,406; Referee: Gilmour

1 November 2003 SFL2	Airdrie United	1–6	Greenock Morton	Excelsior Stadium
15:00	McKeown 81'	ESPN Report	Greacen 20', 54'; Maisano 23', 72'; Williams 29'; Walker 62'	Attendance: 3,159; Referee: McCurry

8 November 2003 SFL2	Airdrie United	1–1	East Fife	Excelsior Stadium
15:00	Docherty 64'	ESPN Report	Deuchar 71'	Attendance: 1,418; Referee: Dougal

16 November 2003 SFL2	Dumbarton	2–0	Airdrie United	Strathclyde Homes Stadium
15:00	Dillon 64', 69'	ESPN Report		Attendance: 1,361; Referee: Sproule

2 December 2003 SFL2	Arbroath	1–1	Airdrie United	Gayfield Park
19:45	Diack 57'	ESPN Report	Ronald 48'	Attendance: 405; Referee: MacKay

6 December 2003 SFL2	Airdrie United	1–1	Berwick Rangers	Excelsior Stadium
15:00	Coyle 39'	ESPN Report	Hutchison 72'	Attendance: 1,254; Referee: Fyfe

13 December 2003 SFL2	Airdrie United	3–3	Forfar Athletic	Excelsior Stadium
15:00	Coyle 29'; Gow 57' (Penalty), 81'	ESPN Report	Sellars 36'; Davidson 52'; Tosh 57' (Penalty)	Attendance: 1,074; Referee: J Gilmour

27 December 2003 SFL2	Stenhousemuir	0–1	Airdrie United	Ochilview Park
15:00		ESPN Report	McKenna 1' (Own goal)	Attendance: 1,243; Referee: McCurry

24 January 2004 SFL2	Airdrie United	0–1	Arbroath	Excelsior Stadium
15:00		ESPN Report	McMullan 66'	Attendance: 1,267; Referee: Downie

7 February 2004 SFL2	East Fife	0–1	Airdrie United	Bayview Stadium
15:00		ESPN Report	Dunn 44'	Attendance: 793; Referee: Boyle

14 February 2004 SFL2	Airdrie United	1–1	Dumbarton	Excelsior Stadium
15:00	Vareille 10'	ESPN Report	Rodgers 87'	Attendance: 1,379; Referee: Toner

21 February 2004 SFL2	Airdrie United	4–0	Stenhousemuir	Excelsior Stadium
15:00	Vareille 29', 34', 36', 43'	ESPN Report		Attendance: 1,324; Referee: Fyfe

2 March 2004 SFL2	Airdrie United	3–0	Hamilton Academical	Excelsior Stadium
19:30	Coyle 39', 48', 67'	ESPN Report		Attendance: 1,634; Referee: Young

6 March 2004 SFL2	Airdrie United	2–1	Alloa Athletic	Excelsior Stadium
15:00	McLaren 38', 45'	ESPN Report	Daly 21'	Attendance: 1,542; Referee: Underhill

9 March 2004 SFL2	Greenock Morton	1–1	Airdrie United	Cappielow Park
19:30	Maisano 37'	ESPN Report	Gow 62' (Penalty)	Attendance: 3,252; Referee: Flemming

13 March 2004 SFL2	Hamilton Academical	0–1	Airdrie United	New Douglas Park
15:00		ESPN Report	Coyle 18'	Attendance: 2,559; Referee: Rowbotham

16 March 2004 SFL2	Berwick Rangers	1–1	Airdrie United	Shielfield Park
19:30	Hilland 20'	ESPN Report	McLaren 80'	Attendance: 502; Referee: Hardie

23 March 2004 SFL2	Forfar Athletic	1–3	Airdrie United	Station Park
19:30	Ferry 28'	ESPN Report	McLaren 13', 75'; Christie 17'	Attendance: 710; Referee: Murray

27 March 2004 SFL2	Dumbarton	1–2	Airdrie United	Strathclyde Homes Stadium
15:00	Herd 29'	ESPN Report	Glancy 9'; McLaren 62'	Attendance: 1,536; Referee: Thompson

31 March 2004 SFL2	Airdrie United	2–1	East Fife	Excelsior Stadium
19:30	Dunn 36'; McLaren 54'	ESPN Report	Stein 77'	Attendance: 1,597; Referee: Winter

3 April 2004 SFL2	Airdrie United	6–0	Berwick Rangers	Excelsior Stadium
15:00	gow 4', 20'; Coyle 7', 18', 86'; Docherty 24'	ESPN Report		Attendance: 1,546; Referee: Mitchell

10 April 2004 SFL2	Arbroath	0–4	Airdrie United	Gayfield Park
15:00		ESPN Report	McKeown 42'; McLaren 47'; Wilson 74'; Lovering 80'	Attendance: 1,074; Referee: Allan

17 April 2004 SFL2	Stenhousemuir	0–3	Airdrie United	Ochilview Park
15:00		ESPN Report	Lovering 15'; Coyle 51'; Gow 56' (Penalty)	Attendance: 1,475; Referee: Mack

24 April 2004 SFL2	Airdrie United	2–2	Forfar Athletic	Excelsior Stadium
15:00	McLaren 47'; Coyle 74'	ESPN Report	Davidson 35'; Shields 73'	Attendance: 1,959; Referee: Cassidy

1 May 2004 SFL2	Airdrie United	1–1	Hamilton Academical	Excelsior Stadium
15;00	Gow 57'	ESPN Report	McPhee 82'	Attendance: 2,936; Referee: Brown

8 May 2004 SFL2	Alloa Athletic	0–1	Airdrie United	Recreation Park
15:00		ESPN Report	Coyle 26'	Attendance: 1,635; Referee: Ritchie

15 May 2004 SFL2	Airdrie United	2–0	Greenock Morton	Excelsior Stadium
15:00	Gow 52'; Coyle 89'	ESPN Report		Attendance: 5,709; Referee: Young

=== Challenge Cup ===
2 August 2003 Challenge Cup R1	Airdrie United	2–0	Montrose	Excelsior Stadium
15:00	McKeown 55', 62'	ESPN Report		Attendance: 1,151; Referee: Brines

12 August 2003 Challenge Cup R2	Greenock Morton	1–2	Airdrie United	Cappielow
19:30	Maisano 46'	ESPN Report	Vareille 60'; Roberts 71'	Attendance: 3,317; Referee: Young

26 August 2003 Challenge Cup QF	Forfar Athletic	0–2	Airdrie United	Station Park
19:45	Byers (red card) 85'	Report	Wilson 55'; Dunn 74'	Attendance: 752; Referee: Rowbotham

17 September 2003 Challenge Cup SF	Brechin City	1–2 (a.e.t.)	Airdrie United	Glebe Park
19:45	White 15'	Report	Dunn 35'; Vareille (red card) 45'; Gow 112'	Attendance: 803; Referee: McDonald

26 October 2003 Challenge Cup Final	Inverness Caledonian Thistle	2–0	Airdrie United	McDiarmid Park
15:00	Bingham 79'; Hislop 89'	Report		Attendance: 5,428; Referee: Young

=== League Cup ===
2 September 2003 League Cup R1	East Fife	0–2	Airdrie United	Bayview
19:30		BBC Report	Roberts 35'; Ronald 86'	Attendance: 707; Referee: Brines

23 September 2003 League Cup R2	Clyde	2–1	Airdrie United	Broadwood
19:30	Millen 55'; Gilhaney 70'	BBC Report		Attendance: 1,381; Referee: McCurry

=== Scottish Cup ===
20 December 2003 Scottish Cup R2	Inverurie Loco Works	1–5	Airdrie United	Harlaw Park
15:00	Ross 86'	SFA Report; Report	Coyle 2', 84'; McKeown 24'; Stewart 27'; Roberts 64'	Attendance: 1,523; Referee: Mitchell

10 January 2004 Scottish Cup R3	St Mirren	2–0	Airdrie United	Love Street
15:00	Lavety 83'; McKenna 90'	SFA Report; Report		Attendance: 3,490; Referee: Murray

== Player statistics ==
=== Squad ===
No.	Pos	Nat	Player	Total		Second Division		Scottish Cup		League Cup		Other^{[a]}	
No.	Pos	Nat	Player	Apps	Goals	Apps	Goals	Apps	Goals	Apps	Goals	Apps	Goals
	GK	(Scotland) SCO	Mark McGeown	45	0	36	0	2	0	2	0	5	0
	DF	(Scotland) SCO	Allan McManus	38	0	29	0	2	0	2	0	5	0
	DF	(Scotland) SCO	Scott Wilson	24	2	19	1	0	0	1	0	4	1
	DF	(Scotland) SCO	Stephen McKenna	1	0	1	0	0	0	0	0	0	0
	DF	(Scotland) SCO	Neil McGowan	39	0	32	0	1	0	2	0	4	0
	DF	(Scotland) SCO	Paul Lovering	18	2	18	2	0	0	0	0	0	0
	DF	(Scotland) SCO	Kevin Christie	14	1	13	1	1	0	0	0	0	0
	DF	(Scotland) SCO	Sandy Stewart	20	1	13	0	2	1	1	0	4	0
	DF	(Benin) BEN	Félicien Singbo	8	0	5	0	0	0	1	0	2	0
	MF	(Scotland) SCO	Willie Wilson	30	0	23	0	1	0	2	0	4	0
	MF	(Scotland) SCO	Kenny Black	9	0	4	0	1	0	1	0	3	0
	MF	(Scotland) SCO	Stephen Docherty	34	4	27	4	2	0	1	0	4	0
	MF	(Scotland) SCO	David Dunn	35	6	28	4	1	0	2	0	4	2
	MF	(Scotland) SCO	Stephen McKeown	33	7	28	4	2	1	0	0	3	2
	MF	(Scotland) SCO	Marvyn Wilson	42	0	33	0	2	0	2	0	5	0
	FW	(Scotland) SCO	Willie McLaren	22	9	21	9	1	0	0	0	0	0
	FW	(Scotland) SCO	Mark Roberts	39	4	30	1	2	1	2	1	5	1
	FW	(Scotland) SCO	Alan Gow	41	12	32	11	2	0	2	0	5	1
	FW	(Scotland) SCO	Martin Glancy	33	3	26	2	1	0	2	1	4	0
	FW	(Scotland) SCO	Owen Coyle	25	15	23	13	2	2	0	0	0	0
	FW	(Scotland) SCO	Paul Ronald	20	2	13	1	2	0	1	1	4	0
	FW	(France) FRA	Jérôme Vareille	41	11	33	10	1	0	2	0	5	1
			Trialist	1	0	1	0	0	0	0	0	0	0

a. Includes other competitive competitions, including playoffs and the Scottish Challenge Cup.
