= 2001–02 Scottish Challenge Cup =

2001–02 Bell's Challenge Cup
Tournament details
- Country: Scotland
- Teams: 30

Final positions
- Champions: Airdrieonians
- Runners-up: Alloa Athletic

Tournament statistics
- Matches played: 29
- Goals scored: 103 (3.55 per match)

The 2001–02 Scottish Challenge Cup was the 11th season of the competition, which was also known as the Bell's Challenge Cup for sponsorship reasons. It was competed for by the 30 member clubs of the Scottish Football League. The defending champions were Airdrieonians, who defeated Livingston 3–2 on penalties in the 2000 final.

The final was played on 14 October 2001, between Airdrieonians and Alloa Athletic at Broadwood Stadium in Cumbernauld. Airdrieonians won 2–1, to win the tournament for a third time after winning the 1994 and 2000 finals.

== Schedule ==
Round	First match date	Fixtures	Clubs
First round	Tuesday 7 August 2001	14	30 → 16
Second round	Tuesday 14 August 2001	8	16 → 8
Quarter-finals	Tuesday 21 August 2001	4	8 → 4
Semi-finals	Tuesday 28 August 2001	2	4 → 2
Final	Sunday 14 October 2001	1	2 → 1

== First round ==
Clydebank and Dumbarton received random byes into the second round.

7 August 2001	Berwick Rangers	3–0	Elgin City	Shielfield Park, Berwick-upon-Tweed
19:30 BST	Ritchie 36'; Glancy 56'; Wood 81'

7 August 2001	Brechin City	4–1	Stirling Albion	Glebe Park, Brechin
19:30 BST	Templeman 3'; Fotheringham 15' (pen.), 71'; Smith 43'		Henderson 46' (pen.)

7 August 2001	Cowdenbeath	0 – 2 (a.e.t.)	Ross County	Central Park, Cowdenbeath
19:30 BST			Hislop 96', 106'

7 August 2001	East Fife	2–3	Raith Rovers	Bayview Park, Methil
19:30 BST	McManus 24'; Graham 43'; Herkes (red card) 81'		Novo 53', 89'; Dennis 67'

7 August 2001	East Stirlingshire	0–1	Alloa Athletic	Firs Park, Falkirk
19:30 BST			McGhee 81' (o.g.)

7 August 2001	Falkirk	4–1	Arbroath	Brockville Park, Falkirk
19:30 BST	Kerr 10'; Watson 29', 59' (pen.); Craig 64'		Brownlie 17'

7 August 2001	Inverness Caledonian Thistle	3 – 2 (a.e.t.)	Forfar Athletic	Caledonian Stadium, Inverness
19:30 BST	Christie 7'; Bavidge 16'; Ritchie 115'		Good 21'; Moffat 57'

7 August 2001	Greenock Morton	1–3	Clyde	Cappielow, Greenock
19:30 BST	O'Connor 44'; Greacen (red card) 82'		Jack 12', 84'; Convery 14'

7 August 2001	Peterhead	2–0	Hamilton Academical	Balmoor, Peterhead
19:30 BST	Stewart 39', 83'

7 August 2001	St Mirren	1–3	Ayr United	Love Street, Paisley
19:30 BST	Yardley 49'		Teale 15'; Sheerin 49'; Annand 72'

7 August 2001	Stenhousemuir	1–4	Stranraer	Ochilview Park, Stenhousemuir
19:30 BST	Mooney 44'		Gaughan 42'; Wright 78'; Johnstone 82'; Gallagher 90'

7 August 2001	Airdrieonians	2–0	Queen of the South	Excelsior Stadium, Airdrie
19:45 BST	McPherson 61'; Taylor 63'

7 August 2001	Albion Rovers	2 – 0 (a.e.t.)	Montrose	Cliftonhill, Coatbridge
19:45 BST	Hamilton 108'; McMullan 117'		Christie (red card) 91'

7 August 2001	Partick Thistle	5–0	Queen's Park	Firhill Stadium, Glasgow
19:45 BST	Lennon 8', 14'; Britton 39', 49'; Hardie 85'

Source: ESPN Soccernet and Soccerbase

== Second round ==
14 August 2001	Albion Rovers	1–4	Airdrieonians	New Douglas Park, Hamilton
19:30 BST	Bonar 66'	Report	Taylor 35'; Roberts 45'; Coyle 65'; James 88'	Attendance: 1,023; Referee: John R. Underhill

14 August 2001	Alloa Athletic	3 – 2 (a.e.t.)	Inverness Caledonian Thistle	Recreation Park, Alloa
19:30 BST	Evans 36'; Irvine 112'; Little 116'	Report	Ritchie 78'; Wyness 91'; McBain (red card) 117'	Attendance: 394; Referee: Dougie McDonald

14 August 2001	Brechin City	4–0	Peterhead	Glebe Park, Brechin
19:30 BST	Grant 2'; Smith 65', 82'; Bain 70'	Report		Attendance: 502; Referee: T Brown

14 August 2001	Clyde	5–0	Berwick Rangers	Broadwood Stadium, Cumbernauld
19:30 BST	Kane 30', 36'; Mitchell 45'; Keogh 60'; McCusker 70'	Report	O'Connor (red card) 10'; Wood (red card) 17'	Attendance: 593; Referee: John Rowbotham

14 August 2001	Dumbarton	0–2	Ross County	Strathclyde Homes Stadium, Dumbarton
19:30 BST		Report	McQuade 47'; Hislop 67'	Attendance: 432; Referee: Kevin Toner

14 August 2001	Falkirk	0–0 (4–5 p)	Clydebank	Brockville Park, Falkirk
19:30 BST		Report		Attendance: 1,128; Referee: Stuart Dougal

14 August 2001	Raith Rovers	3 – 5 (a.e.t.)	Partick Thistle	Stark's Park, Kirkcaldy
19:30 BST	Matheson 13'; Novo 45'; Zoco 120'	Report	McDowell 35'; McCallum 74'; Fleming 100', 105'; Hardie 114'	Attendance: 1,650; Referee: Kenny Clark

14 August 2001	Stranraer	3–2	Ayr United	Stair Park, Stranraer
19:30 BST	Finlayson 36'; Harty 57'; Wright 58'	Report	Bradford 7'; McGinlay 82'	Attendance: 1,387; Referee: Robert Orr

Source: ESPN Soccernet and Soccerbase

== Quarter-finals ==
21 August 2001
19:30 BST

Alloa Athletic	4 – 3 (a.e.t.)	Stranraer
Fisher 16'; Little 25'; Hamilton 44'; Curran 119'	Report	Gallagher 33', 71'; Jenkins 57'

Recreation Park, Alloa
Attendance: 450
Referee: Mike McCurry

21 August 2001
19:30 BST

Clyde	1–0	Partick Thistle
Keogh 58'	Report	Hardie (red card) 63'

Broadwood Stadium, Cumbernauld
Attendance: 2,835
Referee: Willie Young

21 August 2001
19:30 BST

Clydebank	1–2	Airdrieonians
Burke 40' (pen.)	Report	McPherson 10'; Coyle 31'

Strathclyde Homes Stadium, Dumbarton
Attendance: 456
Referee: Kevin Toner

21 August 2001
19:30 BST

Ross County	0–2	Brechin City
	Report	Grant 17'; Kernaghan 83'

Victoria Park, Dingwall
Attendance: 1,209
Referee: I Fyfe

== Semi-finals ==
28 August 2001
19:30 BST

Airdrieonians	1 – 1 (a.e.t.) (4 – 3 pen.)	Brechin City
Roberts 23'	Report	Fotheringham 87'

New Broomfield, Airdrie
Referee: Hugh Dallas

28 August 2001
19:30 BST

Clyde	0–1	Alloa Athletic
	Report	Hutchison 55'

Broadwood Stadium, Cumbernauld
Attendance: 1,197
Referee: John R. Underhill

== Final ==
14 October 2001
15:00

Airdrieonians	2–1	Alloa Athletic
Coyle 76'; Roberts 85'	Report	Evans 90'

Broadwood Stadium, Cumbernauld
Attendance: 4,548
Referee: Mike McCurry
