= 2007–08 Partick Thistle F.C. season =

Partick Thistle
2007–08 season
- Chairman: Allan Cowan
- Manager: Ian McCall
- Stadium: Firhill Stadium
- Scottish First Division: 6th
- Scottish Cup: Quarter-final
- League Cup: Third round
- Challenge Cup: Third round
- Top goalscorer: League: Liam Buchanan (11); All: Liam Buchanan (14)
- Highest home attendance: 9,909 vs Rangers
- Lowest home attendance: 1,126 vs Berwick Rangers

During the 2007–08 season, Partick Thistle participated in the Scottish First Division and finished the season in 6th place. They reached the Quarter Final of the Scottish Cup, where they took eventual winners Rangers to a replay. The season saw the return of former Jag David Rowson who played in 45 competitive matches, the most appearances for any player. This season was Ian McCall's first season in charge of the club as manager.

== Team kit ==
The team kit for the 2007–08 season was produced by Diadora and the main shirt sponsor was Resolution Asset Management.

Home colours	Away colours

== Current squad ==
Note: Flags indicate national team as defined under FIFA eligibility rules; some limited exceptions apply. Players may hold more than one non-FIFA nationality.

No.	Pos.	Nation	Player
—	GK	NIR	Jonathan Tuffey
—	GK	SCO	Craig Hinchliffe
—	GK	SCO	Charles Samushonga (Youth Squad)
—	DF	SCO	Michael Robertson (Youth Squad)
—	DF	SCO	Alan Archibald
—	DF	SCO	William Kinniburgh
—	DF	SCO	Ricky Little (Youth Squad)
—	DF	SCO	John Robertson
—	DF	SCO	Marc Twaddle
—	DF	AUS	Simon Storey
—	MF	SCO	Simon Donnelly
—	MF	IRN	Pedram Ardalany (Youth Squad)

No.	Pos.	Nation	Player
—	MF	SCO	Gary Harkins
—	MF	SCO	Stephen McKeown
—	MF	SCO	Ryan McStay
—	MF	SCO	David Rowson
—	MF	SCO	Stevie Murray
—	MF	SCO	Kevin McKinlay
—	MF	SCO	Scott Chaplain
—	FW	SCO	Liam Buchanan
—	FW	IRL	Paul Keegan
—	FW	SCO	Mark Roberts
—	FW	SCO	Graeme Eaglesham (Youth Squad)
—	FW	CZE	Vitezslav Mooc

== Match results ==
=== Friendlies ===
Friendly match results
Date	Opponent	Venue	Result F–A	Scorers	Attendance	Ref.
11 July 2007	Montrose	A	0–2		432	
17 July 2007	Stenhousemuir	A	2–2	Chaplain, Trialist	456	
19 July 2007	Falkirk	H	2–0	Roberts, Buchanan	970	
21 July 2007	Ayr United	H	1–2	Chaplain	1,185	
24 July 2007	Leicester City	H	0–2		1,403	
26 July 2007	Albion Rovers	A	2–0	Buchanan (2)		
28 July 2007	Queen's Park	A	0–1		937	

=== First Division ===
First Division results
Date	Opponent	Venue	Result F–A	Scorers	Attendance	Ref.
4 August 2007	Stirling Albion	A	1–1	Donnelly	2,215	
11 August 2007	Livingston	H	3–0	Strachan (2), Buchanan	2,481	
18 August 2007	Clyde	H	4–0	Chaplain, Buchanan, Twaddle, Higgins (o.g.)	3,175	
25 August 2007	Dundee	A	0–3		4,354	
1 September 2007	Hamilton Accies	H	0–3		3,075	
15 September 2007	St Johnstone	A	1–2	Buchanan	2,895	
22 September 2007	Queen of the South	H	2–0	Buchanan, McKinlay	2,419	
29 September 2007	Dunfermline Athletic	A	0–1		4,351	
6 October 2007	Morton	A	2–4	Storey, Twaddle	3,338	
20 October 2007	Stirling Albion	H	1–1	Buchanan	2,071	
27 October 2007	Dundee	H	1–1	Keegan	2,589	
3 November 2007	Clyde	A	2–1	Chaplain, Harkins	1,980	
10 November 2007	Hamilton Accies	A	0–2		2,755	
14 November 2007	Livingston	A	4–0	Chaplain, Buchanan (2), Roberts	2,018	
1 December 2007	St Johnstone	H	2–2	Roberts, Chaplain	2,388	
8 December 2007	Queen of the South	A	2–1	Buchanan (2)	1,753	
15 December 2007	Dunfermline Athletic	H	1–1	Buchanan	2,176	
22 December 2007	Morton	H	1–1	Di Giacomo	3,611	
29 December 2007	Dundee	A	0–1		4,548	
2 January 2008	Clyde	H	1–1	Roberts	3,299	
5 January 2008	St Johnstone	A	0–2		2,490	
19 January 2008	Hamilton Accies	H	3–0	McKinlay (2), Buchanan	2,409	
9 February 2008	Stirling Albion	A	0–1		1,306	
16 February 2008	Dunfermline Athletic	A	1–1	McKeown	1,306	
23 February 2008	Queen of the South	H	0–0		2,599	
1 March 2008	Clyde	A	4–1	Gray (2), Roberts, Chaplain	1,717	
4 March 2008	Livingston	H	2–1	McKeown, Gray	1,372	
15 March 2008	Morton	A	0–0		2,682	
22 March 2008	St Johnstone	H	0–0		2,309	
29 March 2008	Hamilton	A	0–0		2,150	
1 April 2008	Dundee	H	1–0	Roberts	2,426	
5 April 2008	Dunfermline Athletic	H	0–1		2,500	
8 April 2008	Stirling Albion	H	1–0	Keegan	1,267	
16 April 2008	Queen of the South	A	0–2		1,702	
19 April 2008	Livingston	A	0–1		1,575	
26 April 2008	Morton	H	0–3		4,915	

=== Scottish Cup ===
Scottish Cup results
Round	Date	Opponent	Venue	Result F–A	Scorers	Attendance	Ref.
Third round	24 November 2007	Ayr United	H	2–1	Roberts, Buchanan	2,260	
Fourth round	22 January 2008	Dunfermline Athletic	H	2–1	Buchanan (2)	2,434	
Fifth round	2 February 2008	Livingston	A	0–0		2,110	
Fifth round replay	12 February 2008	Livingston	H	1–1 (a.e.t.) (5–4 p)	Twaddle	2,554	
Quarter-final	19 March 2008	Rangers	A	1–1	Gray	36,724	
Quarter-final replay	13 April 2008	Rangers	H	0–2		9,909	

=== Scottish League Cup ===
Scottish League Cup results
Round	Date	Opponent	Venue	Result F–A	Scorers	Attendance	Ref.
First round	8 August 2007	Airdrie United	H	2–1	Harkins, Murray	2,125	
Second round	28 August 2007	St Johnstone	H	0–0 (a.e.t.) (5–4 p)		1,769	
Third round	26 September 2007	Aberdeen	H	0–2		3,337	

=== Scottish Challenge Cup ===
Scottish Challenge Cup results
Round	Date	Opponent	Venue	Result F–A	Scorers	Attendance	Ref.
Second round	4 September 2007	Berwick Rangers	H	3–1	Harkins, Di Giacomo, Keegan	1,226	
Third round	18 September 2007	Ayr United	A	1–2 (a.e.t.)	Forrest(OG)	1,110	

== Player statistics ==
Player	Total Apps	Sub Apps	Goals	YC	RC
David Rowson	45	0	0	6	0
Marc Twaddle	43	1	3	5	0
Simon Storey	40	4	1	4	0
John Robertson	39	0	0	1	0
Alan Archibald	37	0	0	6	1
Gary Harkins	35	5	4	8	0
Jonathan Tuffey	33	1	0	0	0
Scott Chaplain	32	6	5	4	0
Mark Roberts	29	7	6	2	0
Liam Buchanan	28	3	14	0	0
Kevin McKinlay	22	12	3	4	0
William Kinniburgh	20	2	0	9	1
Stevie Murray	18	22	1	4	0
Ryan McStay	15	11	0	4	0
Craig Hinchliffe	13	0	0	0	0
Simon Donnelly	12	1	2	0	
Damon Gray (loaned from Hibernian)	12	1	4	1	0
Stephen McKeown	12	1	2	1	0
Paul Di Giacomo (loaned from Kilmarnock)	6	2	2	0	0
Adam Strachan	6	2	2	0	0
Paul Keegan	5	24	3	1	0
Jimmy Gibson	5	6	0	1	0
Greg Cameron (loaned from Dundee United)	3	0	0	0	0
Vitezslav Mooc	3	0	0	0	0
Ricky Little	2	1	0	0	0
Stephen Connor (loaned from Everton)	1	2	0	0	0
Graeme Eaglesham	0	2	0	0	0
Pedram Ardalany	0	1	0	0	0

=== Goalscorers ===
Player	League	Scottish Cup	League Cup	Challenge Cup	Total
Liam Buchanan	11	3	0	0	14
Mark Roberts	5	1	0	0	6
Scott Chaplain	5	0	0	0	5
Damon Gray	3	1	0	0	4
Kevin McKinlay	3	0	0	0	3
Paul Keegan	2	0	0	1	3
Marc Twaddle	2	1	0	0	3
Gary Harkins	1	0	1	1	3
Stephen McKeown	2	0	0	0	2
Adam Strachan	2	0	0	0	2
Paul Di Giacomo	1	0	0	1	2
Simon Donnelly	1	0	0	0	1
Simon Storey	1	0	0	0	1
Stevie Murray	0	0	1	0	1

== League table ==
Pos	Team	Pld	W	D	L	GF	GA	GD	Pts	Promotion, qualification or relegation
4	Queen of the South	36	14	10	12	47	43	+4	52	Qualification for the UEFA Cup second qualifying round (Note: Queen of the South qualified for the UEFA Cup Second Qualifying Round as Scottish Cup runners-up)
5	Dunfermline Athletic	36	13	12	11	36	41	−5	51	
6	Partick Thistle	36	11	12	13	40	39	+1	45	
7	Livingston	36	10	9	17	55	66	−11	39	
8	Greenock Morton	36	9	10	17	40	58	−18	37	

Source: BBC Sport
Rules for classification: 1) points; 2) goal difference; 3) number of goals scored.
