= 2001 Scottish Challenge Cup final =

- Event: 2001–02 Scottish Challenge Cup
Airdrieonians	Alloa Athletic
First Division	Second Division
2	1
- Date: 14 October 2001
- Venue: Broadwood Stadium, Cumbernauld
- Man of the Match: Mark Roberts
- Referee: Mike McCurry
- Attendance: 4,548

The 2001 Scottish Challenge Cup final was played on 14 October 2001, at Broadwood Stadium in Cumbernauld and was the 11th staging of the final in the history of the tournament. It was played between Airdrieonians and Alloa Athletic of the First and Second Divisions respectively. Airdrieonians emerged winners after defeating Alloa Athletic 2–1 to win the tournament for the second consecutive year, also being Airdrieonians last honour before going into liquidation in 2002.

== Route to the final ==
=== Airdrieonians ===
Round	Opposition	Score
First round	Queen of the South (h)	2–0
Second round	Albion Rovers (a)	4–1
Quarter-final	Clydebank (a)	2–1
Semi-final	Brechin City (h)	1–1 (a.e.t.) (4–3 pens)

The first round draw brought Queen of the South to face Airdrieonians at the Excelsior Stadium for the second consecutive season with the home team emerging 2–0 victors. The second round was an away game at rivals Albion Rovers with Airdrie producing a 4–1 win to progress to the quarter-finals. Just like the previous season Airdrie were drawn against Clydebank in the quarter-finals and again emerged winners with a 2–1 victory. The semi-final draw paired the club with Brechin City at home and it took penalties to separate the sides with The Diamonds winning 4–3 after a 1–1 draw after extra time to progress to the final. Airdrieonians reached the Scottish Challenge Cup final for the third time, and second consecutive season since winning the 1994 final against Dundee and defeating Livingston the previous season to win the 2000 final.

=== Alloa Athletic ===
Round	Opposition	Score
First round	East Stirlingshire (a)	1–0
Second round	Inverness Caledonian Thistle (h)	3–2 (a.e.t.)
Quarter-final	Stranraer (h)	4–3 (a.e.t.)
Semi-final	Clyde (a)	1–0

Alloa Athletic were drawn against East Stirlingshire away from home in the first round at Firs Park and produced a 1–0 victory over the club. The second round draw saw The Wasps drawn against Inverness Caledonian Thistle whom they defeated on penalties in the 1999 final, with the game being decided in extra time again with Alloa Athletic emerging 3–2 winners after a 1–1 draw after 90 minutes. Another home game was drawn in the quarter-finals with Stranraer providing the opposition which saw Alloa Athletic win in extra time for a second consecutive game by winning 4–3 to progress to the semi-finals. The opposition provided was Clyde away from home with Alloa Athletic winning 1–0 to reach the Scottish Challenge Cup final for the second time after their 1999 triumph.

== Pre-match ==
=== Analysis ===
Airdrie and Alloa both played two games at home and two away each. In the process Airdrieonians scored nine goals and conceded three whilst Alloa Athletic also scored nine but conceded five. However, Alloa Athletic had kept a total of two clean sheets, both away from home, compared with Airdrie's one clean sheet. In Alloa's two games at Recreation Park it took extra time on both occasions before the club emerged winners. One of Airdrieonians' games had gone to extra time but then penalties before a winner was declared. This was Airdrieonians' third time competing in the Scottish Challenge Cup final, whilst holding a 100% record after winning both the 1994 and 2000 finals. Alloa Athletic were appearing in the final for the second time in the club's history since defeating Inverness Caledonian Thistle on penalties after a 4–4 draw in the 1999 final. On the road to that final Alloa Athletic had knocked out Airdrieonians in the second round at the Excelsior Stadium.

== Match ==
October 14, 2001
15:00

Airdrieonians	2 – 1	Alloa Athletic
Coyle 76'; Roberts 85'	Report	Evans 90'

Broadwood Stadium, Cumbernauld
Attendance: 4,548
Referee: Mike McCurry

=== Teams ===
AIRDRIEONIANS:
GK	1	(Scotland) Allan Ferguson
MF	2	(Republic of Ireland) Paul Armstrong
DF	3	(Scotland) Craig McPherson
DF	4	(Scotland) Sandy Stewart
DF	5	(Scotland) Allan McManus (c)
DF	6	(Scotland) Kevin James
MF	7	(Scotland) Lee Gardner	(substituted off) 73'
MF	8	(Scotland) Neil MacFarlane
FW	9	(Republic of Ireland) Owen Coyle
MF	10	(Scotland) Stuart Taylor
FW	11	(Scotland) Mark Roberts
Substitutes:
FW	12	(Scotland) Robert Dunn	(substituted in) 73'
FW	14	(Scotland) Colin McDonald
DF	15	(England) Darren Beesley
MF	16	(Scotland) Stephen Docherty
GK	17	(England) Neil Bennett
Manager:
(Scotland) Ian McCall

ALLOA ATHLETIC:
GK	1	(Scotland) Derek Soutar
DF	2	(Scotland) Andy Seaton
DF	3	(Scotland) Gregg Watson
DF	4	(Scotland) Steven Thomson
DF	5	(Scotland) Keith Knox	(substituted off) 79'
DF	6	(Scotland) Craig Valentine
MF	7	(Scotland) James Fisher	(substituted off) 72'
MF	8	(Scotland) Ian Little
FW	9	(Scotland) Richard Walker	(substituted off) 57'
FW	10	(Scotland) Gareth Hutchison
MF	11	(Scotland) Ross Hamilton
Substitutes:
MF	12	(Scotland) Harry Curran	(substituted in) 79'
FW	14	(England) Gareth Evans	(substituted in) 57'
MF	15	(Scotland) Martin Christie	(substituted in) 72'
MF	16	(Scotland) William Irvine
GK	17	(Scotland) Jim McQueen
Manager:
(Scotland) Terry Christie
