= 2008–09 Partick Thistle F.C. season =

Partick Thistle
2008–09 season
- Chairman: Allan Cowan
- Manager: Ian McCall
- Stadium: Firhill Stadium
- Scottish First Division: 2nd
- Scottish Cup: Fourth round (Eliminated by ICT)
- League Cup: Third round (Eliminated by Rangers)
- Challenge Cup: Semi-final (Eliminated by Airdrie United)
- Highest home attendance: 6,497 vs Rangers in the League Cup
- Lowest home attendance: 1,133 vs Peterhead in the League Cup
- Average home league attendance: 2,972

During the 2008–09 season, Partick Thistle participate in the Scottish First Division

== Team kit ==
The team kit for the 2008–09 season is produced by Puma in partnership with Greaves Sports and the main shirt sponsor is Ignis asset management. The away kit is pink with grey stripes, and has attracted much media attention at the start of the season.

Home colours	Away colours

== Current squad ==
Note: Flags indicate national team as defined under FIFA eligibility rules; some limited exceptions apply. Players may hold more than one non-FIFA nationality.

No.	Pos.	Nation	Player
—	GK	NIR	Jonathan Tuffey
—	GK	SCO	Craig Hinchliffe
—	DF	SCO	Alan Archibald
—	DF	SCO	William Kinniburgh
—	DF	SCO	Ian Maxwell
—	DF	SCO	Paul Paton
—	DF	SCO	John Robertson
—	DF	AUS	Simon Storey
—	DF	SCO	Marc Twaddle

No.	Pos.	Nation	Player
—	MF	SCO	Paul Cairney (on loan to Queen's Park)
—	MF	SCO	Scott Chaplain
—	MF	SCO	Gary Harkins
—	MF	SCO	Stephen McKeown
—	MF	SCO	Kevin McKinlay
—	MF	SCO	David Rowson
—	FW	SCO	Liam Buchanan
—	FW	SCO	Simon Donnelly
—	FW	SCO	Kris Doolan

== Youth squad ==
Note: Flags indicate national team as defined under FIFA eligibility rules; some limited exceptions apply. Players may hold more than one non-FIFA nationality.

No.	Pos.	Nation	Player
—	GK	SCO	Ryan Scully
—	DF	SCO	Ricky Little
—	DF	SCO	Ross McGeough
—	DF	SCO	Michael Robertson

No.	Pos.	Nation	Player
—	MF	SCO	Ryan MacBeth
—	MF	SCO	Philip Middlemiss
—	FW	SCO	Graeme Eaglesham (on loan to Albion Rovers)

== Match results ==
=== Friendlies ===
Date	Opponent	Venue	Result	Attendance	Scorers
5 July 2008	Blyth Spartans	Croft Park	3–1	473	McKinlay, Lynch (trialist) (2)
10 July 2008	Ayr United	Somerset Park	2–1		Roberts, McKinlay
10 July 2008	Stranraer	Stair Park	0–3		
12 July 2008	Brechin City	Glebe Park	0–1		
15 July 2008	Stirling Albion	Forthbank	2–0		Paton, Roberts
19 July 2008	Carlisle United	Firhill	0–0	1,235	
21 July 2008	Burnley	Firhill	0–1	1,162	

=== League ===
Date	Opponent	Venue	Result	Attendance	Scorers
2 August 2008	Dunfermline Athletic	Firhill	1-0	3,092	McKeown
9 August 2008	Airdrie Utd	New Broomfield	1–0	2,165	Gray
17 August 2008	Queen of the South	Palmerston Park	0–2	3,272	
23 August 2008	St Johnstone	Firhill	4–0	2,961	Robertson, Maxwell, Paton, Harkins
30 August 2008	Ross County	Firhill	0–1	2,945	
13 September 2008	Clyde	Broadwood	1–1	2,191	Chaplain
20 September 2008	Greenock Morton	Firhill	2–1	3,368	Harkins, Maxwell
27 September 2008	Livingston	Almondvale	1–3	2,150	Maxwell
4 October 2008	Dundee	Firhill	0–0	2,556	
18 October 2008	Dunfermline Athletic	East End Park	0–1	3,242	
25 October 2008	St Johnstone	McDiarmid Park	0–3	2,771	
1 November 2008	Queen of the South	Firhill	2–0	2,971	McKinlay, Harkins
8 November 2008	Clyde	Firhill	2–0	3,003	Buchanan, McKeown
22 November 2008	Livingston	Firhill	2–1	2,416	Buchanan, McKeown
25 November 2008	Ross County	Victoria Park	0–1	1,625	
13 December 2008	Airdrie United	Firhill	2–1	2,296	Harkins, McLaughlin (og)
20 December 2008	Dundee	Dens Park	0–0	3,569	
27 December 2008	Ross County	Firhill	0–2	2,465	
30 December 2008	Greenock Morton	Cappielow	0–2	2,385	
3 January 2009	Clyde	Broadwood	4–2	2,016	Donnelly, Harkins, Paton, Buchanan
17 January 2009	St Johnstone	Firhill	0–0	3,353	
24 January 2009	Queen of the South	Palmerston Park	2–2	2,811	Doolan, Chaplain
31 January 2009	Airdrie United	New Broomfield	1–0	1,988	Buchanan
14 February 2009	Dunfermline Athletic	Firhill	2–3	2,957	Buchanan, Doolan
21 February 2009	Greenock Morton	Firhill	1–0	3,348	Doolan
28 February 2009	Livingston	Almondvale	4–2	2,876	Harkins (2), Paton, Rowson
7 March 2009	Clyde	Firhill	0–1	3,579	
10 March 2009	Ross County	Victoria Park	2–0	2,017	Doolan (2)
14 March 2009	Dunfermline Athletic	East End Park	1–0	2,736	Harkins
22 March 2009	Dundee	Firhill	1–1	3,303	McKinlay
4 April 2009	St Johnstone	McDiarmid Park	1–1	4,909	Harkins
11 April 2009	Queen of the South	Firhill	0–2	2,830	
18 April 2009	Greenock Morton	Cappielow	1–0	3,323	Akins
25 April 2009	Livingston	Firhill	1–0	2,803	Buchanan
2 May 2009	Airdrie United	Firhill	0–1	3,255	
9 May 2009	Dundee	Dens Park	0–4	2,831	

=== Scottish Cup ===
Round	Date	Opponent	Venue	Result	Attendance	Scorers
3	29 November 2008	Stirling Albion	Forthbank Stadium	3–2	1,472	Chaplain, Harkins, Buchanan
4	10 January 2008	Inverness CT	Caledonian Stadium	0–3	1,803	

=== League Cup ===
Round	Date	Opponent	Venue	Result	Attendance	Scorers
1	5 August 2008	Forfar	Firhill	4–3 (a.e.t)	1,195	McKeown, Gray (2), Chaplain
2	26 August 2008	Dundee	Dens Park	2–1	2,507	Maxwell, Harkins
3	24 September 2008	Rangers	Firhill	1–2	6,497	McKeown

=== Challenge Cup ===
Round	Date	Opponent	Venue	Result	Attendance	Scorers
1	26 July 2008	Queen's Park	Firhill	2–1	1,386	Gray, Roberts
2	12 August 2008	Peterhead	Firhill	4–2	1,133	Donnelly, McKeown (2), Harkins
3	7 September 2008	Livingston	Almondvale Stadium	2–0	1,340	Turner, Twaddle
Semi-Final	12 October 2008	Airdrie United	Firhill	0–1	2,761	

== Player statistics ==
=== First Division ===
Player	League Apps	Sub Apps	Goals	YC	RC
Jonathan Tuffey	36	0	0	1	0
David Rowson	35	0	1	2	0
Gary Harkins	34	0	9	7	0
Paul Paton	32	3	3	5	0
Simon Storey	31	1	0	2	1
Marc Twaddle	28	2	0	2	1
John Robertson	28	0	1	1	1
Ian Maxwell	21	3	3	1	1
Simon Donnelly	19	12	1	2	0
Alan Archibald	19	1	0	4	0
Stephen McKeown	18	6	3	2	0
Liam Buchanan	18	2	6	1	0
Kris Doolan	15	1	5	0	0
William Kinniburgh	14	4	0	5	0
Scott Chaplain	13	16	2	2	0
Kevin McKinlay	12	17	2	4	0
Lucas Akins	6	3	1	2	0
Mark Roberts	5	9	0	1	0
Damon Gray	5	5	1	0	0
Steven Lennon	5	3	0	0	0
Ryan McStay	1	2	0	0	0
Chris Turner	1	1	0	1	0
Ricky Little	0	1	0	0	0

=== Scottish Cup ===
Player	Cup Apps	Sub Apps	Goals	YC	RC
Liam Buchanan	2	0	1	0	0
Gary Harkins	2	0	1	0	0
Jonathan Tuffey	2	0	0	1	0
Paul Paton	2	0	0	0	0
Alan Archibald	2	0	0	0	0
Kevin McKinlay	2	0	0	0	0
David Rowson	2	0	0	0	0
Simon Donnelly	2	0	0	0	0
Scott Chaplain	1	1	1	0	0
Ian Maxwell	1	0	0	0	0
Ryan McStay	1	0	0	0	0
Simon Storey	1	0	0	0	0
John Robertson	1	0	0	0	0
Marc Twaddle	1	0	0	0	0
Mark Roberts	0	2	0	1	0
Chris Turner	0	1	0	0	0
Ryan MacBeth	0	1	0	0	0
Kris Doolan	0	1	0	0	0

=== League Cup ===
Player	Cup Apps	Sub Apps	Goals	YC	RC
Simon Storey	3	0	0	1	0
Jonathan Tuffey	3	0	0	0	0
Marc Twaddle	3	0	0	0	0
John Robertson	3	0	0	0	0
Damon Gray	2	1	2	0	0
Gary Harkins	2	1	1	0	0
Ian Maxwell	2	1	1	0	0
Simon Donnelly	2	1	0	0	0
Kevin McKinlay	2	1	0	0	0
Stephen McKeown	2	0	2	0	0
Ryan McStay	2	0	0	0	0
Paul Paton	2	0	0	0	0
Mark Roberts	2	0	0	0	0
David Rowson	2	0	0	0	0
Scott Chaplain	1	2	1	0	0
Steven Lennon	0	1	0	0	0
Chris Turner	0	1	0	0	0

=== Challenge Cup ===
Player	Cup Apps	Sub Apps	Goals	YC	RC
David Rowson	4	0	0	1	0
Ian Maxwell	4	0	0	0	0
Simon Storey	4	0	0	0	0
Scott Chaplain	3	1	0	0	0
Paul Paton	3	1	0	0	0
Gary Harkins	3	0	1	1	0
Marc Twaddle	3	0	1	0	0
Damon Gray	3	0	1	0	0
Craig Hinchliffe	3	0	0	0	0
John Robertson	3	0	0	0	0
Simon Donnelly	2	2	1	0	0
Kevin McKinlay	2	2	0	1	0
Mark Roberts	2	1	1	0	0
William Kinniburgh	2	0	0	1	0
Stephen McKeown	1	1	2	0	0
Chris Turner	1	1	1	0	0
Jonathan Tuffey	1	0	0	0	0
Ryan McStay	0	2	0	0	0
Liam Buchanan	0	1	0	0	0

=== Friendlies ===
Player	Apps	Sub Apps	Goals	YC	RC
Paul Paton	6	0	1	0	0
Marc Twaddle	6	0	0	0	0
Scott Chaplain	5	1	0	0	0
Ian Maxwell	5	0	0	0	0
Kevin McKinlay	4	2	2	0	0
John Robertson	4	2	0	0	0
David Rowson	4	2	0	0	0
Simon Donnelly	4	1	0	0	0
Willie Kinniburgh	4	1	0	0	0
Jonathan Tuffey	4	0	0	0	0
Gary Harkins	3	4	0	0	0
Mark Roberts	3	3	2	0	0
Simon Lynch (trialist)	3	1	2	0	0
Craig Hinchliffe	3	1	0	0	0
Stephen McKeown	3	1	0	0	0
Ryan McStay	3	1	0	0	0
Simon Storey	2	4	0	0	0
Graeme Eaglesham	2	2	0	0	0
Pedram Ardalany	1	1	0	0	0
Ricky Little	1	4	0	0	0
Michael Robertson	1	0	0	0	0
Ryan MacBeth	1	0	0	0	0
Philip Middlemiss	1	0	0	0	0
Jordan Cleland	0	1	0	0	0
Ross McGeough	0	1	0	0	0
Scott Tully	0	1	0	0	0
Alan Vezza	0	1	0	0	0

=== Goalscorers ===
Player	League	Scottish Cup	League Cup	Challenge Cup	Total
Gary Harkins	9	1	1	1	12
Liam Buchanan	6	1	0	0	7
Stephen McKeown	3	0	2	2	7
Kris Doolan	5	0	0	0	5
Ian Maxwell	3	0	1	0	4
Scott Chaplain	2	1	1	0	4
Damon Gray	1	0	2	1	4
Paul Paton	3	0	0	0	3
Kevin McKinlay	2	0	0	0	2
Simon Donnelly	1	0	0	1	2
John Robertson	1	0	0	0	1
David Rowson	1	0	0	0	1
Lucas Akins	1	0	0	0	1
Mark Roberts	0	0	0	1	1
Chris Turner	0	0	0	1	1
Marc Twaddle	0	0	0	1	1

== League table ==
Pos	Team	Pld	W	D	L	GF	GA	GD	Pts	Promotion, qualification or relegation
1	St Johnstone (C, P)	36	17	14	5	55	35	+20	65	Promotion to the Premier League
2	Partick Thistle	36	16	7	13	39	38	+1	55	
3	Dunfermline Athletic	36	14	9	13	52	44	+8	51	
4	Dundee	36	13	11	12	33	32	+1	50	
5	Queen of the South	36	12	11	13	57	50	+7	47	

Source: BBC Sport
Rules for classification: 1) points; 2) goal difference; 3) number of goals scored.
(C) Champions; (P) Promoted
