= 2004–05 Ross County F.C. season =

Ross County
2004–05 season
- Manager: Alex Smith
- Stadium: Victoria Park
- Scottish First Division: 6th
- Scottish Cup: Fourth round
- Scottish League Cup: Second round
- Scottish Challenge Cup: Runner-up

The 2004–05 season saw Ross County compete in the Scottish First Division where they finished in 6th position with 47 points. Ross County reached the 2004 Scottish Challenge Cup Final where they lost 2–1 to Falkirk.

== Final league table ==
Pos	Team	Pld	W	D	L	GF	GA	GD	Pts
4	Queen of the South	36	14	9	13	36	38	−2	51
5	Airdrie United	36	14	8	14	44	48	−4	50
6	Ross County	36	13	8	15	40	37	+3	47
7	Hamilton Academical	36	12	11	13	35	36	−1	47
8	St Johnstone	36	12	10	14	38	39	−1	46

Source: "2004-2005 First Division - SPFL Archive". SPFL (in Malay).
Rules for classification: 1) points; 2) goal difference; 3) number of goals scored.

== Results ==
Ross County's score comes first

=== Legend ===
Win	Draw	Loss

=== Scottish First Division ===
Match	Date	Opponent	Venue	Result	Attendance	Scorers
1	7 August 2004	Queen of the South	A	1–0	1,910	Burke
2	14 August 2004	St Mirren	H	1–1	2,666	Burke
3	21 August 2004	Clyde	A	0–1	1,101	
4	28 August 2004	Partick Thistle	H	0–1	2,781	
5	4 September 2004	Raith Rovers	A	2–1	1,540	Lauchlan, Adam
6	11 September 2004	St Johnstone	H	0–1	2,486	
7	18 September 2004	Airdrie United	A	2–1	1,484	Canning, Winters
8	25 September 2004	Hamilton Academical	A	2–1	1,522	Lauchlan, Higgins
9	2 October 2004	Falkirk	H	0–1	3,062	
10	16 October 2004	St Mirren	A	2–3	2,538	Gillies (o.g.), Adam
11	23 October 2004	Queen of the South	H	1–0	2,354	Cowie
12	30 October 2004	Partick Thistle	A	0–4	2,898	
13	13 November 2004	St Johnstone	A	1–1	2,018	Higgins
14	20 November 2004	Airdrie United	H	1–2	2,345	Docherty (o.g.)
15	23 November 2004	Raith Rovers	H	1–1	1,193	Burke
16	27 November 2004	Falkirk	A	2–2	3,330	McGarry, Malcolm
17	4 December 2004	Hamilton Academical	H	1–1	2,034	McGarry
18	11 December 2004	Queen of the South	A	0–1	1,588	
19	18 December 2004	Clyde	H	0–1	1,953	
20	27 December 2004	Partick Thistle	H	2–1	3,112	Cowie, Canning
21	29 December 2004	Raith Rovers	A	4–1	1,127	Cowie, Lauchlan, Winters, Burke
22	3 January 2005	St Johnstone	H	4–0	3,105	Winters (2), Canning, Lauchlan
23	15 January 2005	Airdrie United	A	1–2	1,512	Winters
24	22 January 2005	Hamilton Academical	A	1–0	1,476	Winters
25	29 January 2005	Falkirk	H	0–1	3,151	
26	19 February 2005	Clyde	A	0–1	1,086	
27	1 March 2005	St Mirren	H	0–1	1,302	
28	5 March 2005	Raith Rovers	H	2–0	2,083	Burke, Higgins
29	12 March 2005	Partick Thistle	A	0–0	2,939	
30	19 March 2005	St Johnstone	A	2–0	1,828	Canning, McGarry
31	2 April 2005	Airdrie United	H	3–1	2,032	Cowie, Higgins (2)
32	9 April 2005	Falkirk	A	0–1	5,209	
33	16 April 2005	Hamilton Academical	H	2–1	2,107	Cowie, Kilgannon
34	23 April 2005	Queen of the South	H	1–1	2,147	McGarry
35	30 April 2005	St Mirren	A	0–1	3,906	
36	7 May 2005	Clyde	H	1–1	2,130	Burke

=== Scottish Cup ===
Match	Date	Opponent	Venue	Result	Attendance	Scorers
R3	24 January 2005	Airdrie United	H	4–1	1,302	Burke, McGeown (o.g.), Winters
R4	5 February 2005	Clyde	H	0–0	1,629	
R4 Replay	15 February 2005	Clyde	A	1–2	1,576	Rankin

=== Scottish League Cup ===
Match	Date	Opponent	Venue	Result	Attendance	Scorers
R1	10 August 2004	Dumbarton	A	3–1	437	Burke (3)
R2	24 August 2004	Inverness Caledonian Thistle	H	0–1	3,315	

=== Scottish Challenge Cup ===
Match	Date	Opponent	Venue	Result	Attendance	Scorers
R1	31 July 2004	St Mirren	H	2–1	950	Burke (2)
R2	31 August 2004	Peterhead	A	2–1	565	Burke, Canning
QF	15 September 2004	Partick Thistle	H	1 – 1 (5 – 3 pens)	1,050	Winters
SF	28 September 2004	Forfar Athletic	H	5–2	2,328	Winters (3), Burke, Cowie
Final	7 November 2004	Falkirk	N	1–2	7,471	Winters

== Squad statistics ==
Pos.	Name	League		FA Cup		League Cup		Other		Total	
Pos.	Name	Apps	Goals	Apps	Goals	Apps	Goals	Apps	Goals	Apps	Goals
GK	(Scotland) Stuart Garden	15(1)	0	0	0	2	0	5	0	22(1)	0
GK	(Scotland) Colin Stewart	21	0	3	0	0	0	0	0	24	0
DF	(Scotland) Martin Canning	33	4	3	0	2	0	4	1	42	5
DF	(Scotland) Jim Lauchlan	28	4	3	0	2	0	5	0	38	4
DF	(Scotland) Stuart Malcolm	10(3)	1	0	0	0	0	3	1	13(3)	1
DF	(Scotland) Mark McCulloch	36	0	3	0	2	0	5	0	46	0
DF	(Scotland) Kevin McKinlay	1(4)	0	0	0	0	0	0	0	1(4)	0
DF	(Scotland) Adam Moffatt	0(1)	0	0	0	0	0	0	0	0(1)	0
DF	(Scotland) John Robertson	25	0	3	0	2	0	3(1)	0	33(1)	0
MF	(Scotland) Charlie Adam	8(2)	2	0	0	0	0	4	0	12(2)	2
MF	(Scotland) Don Cowie	33(1)	5	3	0	2	0	4	1	42(1)	6
MF	(Scotland) Sean Kilgannon	19(8)	1	1(2)	0	1	0	2(2)	0	23(12)	1
MF	(Scotland) John Kilganon	1	0	0	0	0	0	0	0	1	0
MF	(Scotland) Steven Mackay	3(9)	0	0	0	1(1)	0	0(4)	0	4(14)	0
MF	(Scotland) Jamie McCunnie	24(3)	0	2(1)	0	1	0	4	0	31(4)	0
MF	(Scotland) John Rankin	28(2)	0	3	1	2	0	3	0	36(2)	1
MF	(Scotland) Stuart Taylor	5	0	0	0	0	0	0	0	5	0
MF	(Scotland) Fergus Tiernan	16	0	3	0	0	0	0	0	19	0
FW	(Scotland) Alex Burke	28(4)	6	3	1	2	3	4	4	37(4)	14
FW	(Scotland) Craig Gunn	0(1)	0	0	0	0	0	0(1)	0	0(2)	0
FW	(Scotland) Sean Higgins	13(13)	5	0(2)	0	0(2)	0	1(2)	0	14(19)	5
FW	(Scotland) Neil MacDonald	2(5)	0	0	0	0	0	0	0	2(5)	0
FW	(Scotland) Steven McGarry	19(13)	4	0(2)	0	1(1)	0	3(2)	0	23(18)	4
FW	(Scotland) Gary McSwegan	10(7)	0	0	0	2	0	2	0	14(7)	0
FW	(Scotland) David Winters	18(13)	6	3	2	0(2)	0	3(2)	5	24(17)	11
