= Alan Ferguson =

Alan Ferguson may refer to:

- Alan Ferguson (politician) (born 1943), Australian politician
- Alan Ferguson (director) (born 1963), American music video director

== See also ==
- Allan Ferguson (born 1963), Scottish footballer
