= Convery =

Convery is a surname. Notable people with the surname include:

- Aileen Convery (born 1969), Irish swimmer
- Brandon Convery (born 1974), Canadian ice hockey player
- Christian Convery (born 2009), Canadian actor
- Christopher Convery (born 2008), American actor
- Gerry Convery (born 1955), Canadian darts player
- Mark Convery (born 1981), English footballer
- Ruairí Convery (born 1984), Northern Ireland hurler
- Steve Convery (born 1972), Scottish footballer
