= Colin McDonald (footballer, born 1974) =

Scottish footballer

Personal information
- Full name: Colin McDonald
- Date of birth: 10 April 1974 (age 52)
- Place of birth: Edinburgh, Scotland
- Height: 5 ft 7 in (1.70 m)
- Position: Forward

Youth career
- Musselburgh Windsor
- 1991–1993: Hibernian

Senior career*
Years	Team	Apps	(Gls)
1993–1996	Falkirk	57	(11)
1996–1997	Swansea City	18	(0)
1997–1998	Ayr United	4	(0)
1997–1998	→ Clydebank (loan)	8	(6)
1998–1999	Clydebank	45	(16)
1999–2001	Falkirk	31	(6)
2000	→ Berwick Rangers (loan)	4	(0)
2001	→ Arbroath (loan)	5	(3)
2001	Airdrieonians	4	(1)
2001–2002	Berwick Rangers	11	(0)
2002–2003	Montrose	18	(1)
- Gala Fairydean
Total		205	(44)

International career
1994–1995	Scotland U21	6	(0)
- * Club domestic league appearances and goals

Colin McDonald (born 10 April 1974) is a Scottish former footballer, who played for Falkirk, Swansea City, Ayr United, Clydebank, Berwick Rangers, Arbroath, Airdrie and Montrose.

== Honours ==
Airdrieonians

- Scottish Challenge Cup: 2001–02
