= Kevin McKinlay =

Scottish footballer

Personal information
- Full name: Kevin Donald McKinlay
- Date of birth: 28 February 1986 (age 40)
- Place of birth: Stirling, Scotland
- Position: Left wing back

Youth career
- –2006: Chelsea

Senior career*
Years	Team	Apps	(Gls)
2004–2006	→ Ross County (loan)	33	(16)
2006–2007	Ross County	30	(12)
2007–2009	Partick Thistle	54	(9)
2009	Dundalk	11	(8)
2010–2011	Greenock Morton	33	(9)
2011–2014	Stenhousemuir	83	(9)
2014–2015	Ayr United	14	(7)
2015–2016	Stirling Albion	26	(1)
2016–2018	Berwick Rangers	42	(9)
2018-2020	Linlithgow Rose		
- * Club domestic league appearances and goals as of 19:58, 16 May 2018 (UTC)

Kevin Donald McKinlay (born 28 February 1986, in Stirling) is a Scottish professional footballer who plays as a left wingback.

== Career ==
McKinlay signed for Scottish club Ross County after being released by Chelsea, where he was a product of the club's youth system. After a few seasons at the Staggies, McKinlay moved to Glasgow side Partick Thistle in August 2007. Upon the ending of his time at Thistle, he went across the Irish Sea to sign for Dundalk in July 2009.

At the end of the Irish season, he returned home to Scotland to sign for Scottish Football League First Division team Greenock Morton during the January transfer window of 2010. He was released in May 2011. After his release from Morton, McKinlay dropped a division to sign for Second division side Stenhousemuir. In May 2012, McKinlay signed on for a further season at Stenhousemuir. In June 2014, McKinlay announced on his Twitter that he would be joining Ayr United, following his release from Stenhousemuir. He was released by Ayr in January 2015, and quickly signed an 18-month deal at Stirling Albion, where he stayed until the end of the 2015–16 season.

On 2 June 2016 McKinlay became Berwick Rangers' second signing of the summer transfer window after Jordyn Sheerin joined the club the previous day. McKinlay spent two seasons with Berwick, before leaving in May 2018.

McKinlay played for Linlithgow Rose between 2018 and 2020.

== Career statistics ==
As of 16 May 2018

Appearances and goals by club, season and competition
Club	Season	League			Scottish Cup		League Cup		Other		Total	
Club	Season	Division	Apps	Goals	Apps	Goals	Apps	Goals	Apps	Goals	Apps	Goals
Ross County	2004–05	Scottish First Division	5	0	0	0	0	0	0	0	5	0
Ross County	2005–06	Scottish First Division	27	1	3	1	2	0	1 (Note: Appearances in the Scottish Challenge Cup)	0	33	2
Ross County	2006–07	Scottish First Division	30	5	1	0	1	1	4	3	36	9
Ross County	Total		62	6	4	1	3	1	5	3	74	11
Partick Thistle	2007–08	Scottish First Division	26	3	5	0	1	0	1	0	33	3
Partick Thistle	2008–09	Scottish First Division	28	3	2	0	3	0	2	0	35	3
Partick Thistle	Total		54	6	7	0	4	0	3	0	68	6
Greenock Morton	2009–10	Scottish First Division	8	0	0	0	0	0	0	0	8	0
Greenock Morton	2010–11	Scottish First Division	25	0	3	0	0	0	0	0	28	0
Greenock Morton	Total		33	0	3	0	0	0	0	0	36	0
Stenhousemuir	2011–12	Scottish Second Division	29	0	1	0	1	0	1	0	32	0
Stenhousemuir	2012–13	Scottish Second Division	26	2	1	0	3	0	0	0	30	2
Stenhousemuir	2013–14	Scottish League One	28	1	4	0	1	0	1	0	34	1
Stenhousemuir	Total		83	3	6	0	5	0	2	0	96	3
Ayr United	2014–15	Scottish League One	14	0	0	0	2	0	1	0	17	0
Stirling Albion	2014–15	Scottish League One	10	0	0	0	0	0	0	0	10	0
Stirling Albion	2015–16	Scottish League Two	16	1	4	0	0	0	0	0	20	1
Stirling Albion	Total		26	1	4	0	0	0	0	0	30	1
Berwick Rangers	2016–17	Scottish League Two	27	0	0	0	3	0	1	0	31	0
Berwick Rangers	2017–18	Scottish League Two	15	0	2	0	0	0	2	0	19	0
Berwick Rangers	Total		42	0	2	0	3	0	3	0	50	0
Career total			314	16	26	1	17	1	14	3	371	21

== Honours ==
Ross County

- Scottish Challenge Cup: 2006–07
