= John Flood (footballer, born 1960) =

Scottish footballer

Personal information
- Full name: John Gerard Flood
- Date of birth: 25 December 1960 (age 65)
- Place of birth: Glasgow, Scotland
- Position: Striker

Youth career
- Sheffield United

Senior career*
Years	Team	Apps	(Gls)
1978–1980	Sheffield United	19	(1)
1980–1988	Airdrieonians	251	(67)
1988–1992	Partick Thistle	81	(18)
- Kirkintilloch Rob Roy
Total		361	(86)
- * Club domestic league appearances and goals

John Gerard Flood (born 25 December 1960) is a Scottish former professional footballer who played as a striker.

== Career ==
Born in Glasgow, Flood played for Sheffield United, Airdrieonians, Partick Thistle and Kirkintilloch Rob Roy.

== Honours ==
- Airdrieonians Hall of Fame
