= Neil Bennett (footballer, born 1980) =

English footballer (born 1980)

Personal information
- Full name: Neil Robert Bennett
- Date of birth: 29 October 1980 (age 46)
- Place of birth: Dewsbury, England
- Height: 6 ft 2 in (1.88 m)
- Position: Goalkeeper

Team information
- Current team: Huddersfield Town A.F.C

Youth career
- ?–1998: Sheffield Wednesday

Senior career*
Years	Team	Apps	(Gls)
1998–2000	Sheffield Wednesday	0	(0)
2000–2001	Ossett Town		
2001–2002	Airdrieonians	10	(0)
2002	Barrow		
2002–2003	Drogheda United		
2003	Bradford City	0	(0)
2003	Rochdale	1	(0)
2003	Derry City		
2003–2004	Albion Rovers	27	(0)
2004–2005	Partick Thistle	1	(0)
2004	→ Forfar Athletic (loan)	0	(0)
2005–2006	Ossett Town		
2006–2010	Ossett Albion		
2010–2012	Guiseley		
2012–2014	Wakefield		
2014–2025	Ossett Albion		
- * Club domestic league appearances and goals

Neil Robert Bennett (born 29 October 1980) is an English footballer who plays in the goalkeeping position. He is the current goalkeeper Coach for Huddersfield Town A.F.C.

Bennett began his career as a trainee with Sheffield Wednesday but made no League appearances before being released. He joined Ossett Town in the Northern Premier League First Division and made a number of appearances for them during the 2000–01 season. He then moved north of the border and joined Airdrieonians in the Scottish First Division and made 11 appearances for their first team in the 2001–02 season. He signed for Barrow in August 2002 and made his debut on the opening day of the 2002–03 season at home to Hucknall Town. He was replaced by the fit again Simon Bishop after a 3–0 home defeat by Ashton United in mid September and was released in early October. He then moved to Ireland, signing with Drogheda United in November 2002, and playing for them in a number of League of Ireland matches. Early in 2003, he signed a short-term contract with Bradford City He spent the last two months of the season at Rochdale in March 2003. He trialled with Coventry City in the summer of 2003, but did not join the club. He subsequently moved to play in the League of Ireland with Derry City where he made his debut for the club as a trialist in a high-profile friendly match against Barcelona before signing for the club and playing in the UEFA Cup.

In late August 2003 he joined Skelmersdale United.

In September 2003, he moved north of the border again joining Albion Rovers for a season before moving to Partick Thistle in the summer of 2004. During this period he went on loan to Forfar Athletic, but was recalled after one game on the substitute's bench due to an injury for one of Partick's goalkeepers. He was released by Thistle in August 2005.

He later made a return to Ossett Town in September 2005 before moving to Ossett Albion in 2006.

In March 2010 he joined Guiseley. He joined Wakefield in September 2012.

== Honours ==
Airdrieonians

- Scottish Challenge Cup: 2001–02
