= Kevin James (Scottish footballer) =

Scottish footballer

Personal information
- Full name: Kevin Francis James
- Date of birth: 3 December 1975 (age 50)
- Place of birth: Edinburgh, Scotland
- Position: Defender

Senior career*
Years	Team	Apps	(Gls)
1993–1999	Falkirk	48	(9)
1999–2001	Heart of Midlothian	14	(1)
2001	→ Greenock Morton (loan)	9	(2)
2001	→ Airdrieonians (loan)	13	(1)
2001–2002	Airdrieonians	21	(0)
2002–2005	Falkirk	56	(6)
2005–2009	St Johnstone	61	(10)
2009	→ Ayr United (loan)	5	(0)
2009–2010	Ayr United	19	(0)

International career
1997	Scotland under-21s	1	(0)
- * Club domestic league appearances and goals

Kevin Francis James (born 3 December 1975) is a Scottish former professional footballer.

Starting his career at Falkirk in 1993, James has had spells at Hearts, Morton, Airdrieonians and St Johnstone, where he was club captain prior to his release. He joined Ayr United in June 2009, having made an appearance for the club during a month's emergency loan the previous season.

== Club career ==
James began his career at Falkirk in 1993, making 48 appearances and scoring nine goals in his six years with the Bairns. In 1999, he moved to one of his hometown clubs, Hearts, for whom he only made 14 appearances in two years.

In 2001, he was loaned out to Airdrieonians. He joined on a permanent basis later that year. After only nine months in Lanarkshire, James returned to his first club, Falkirk, with whom he went on to make over 50 appearances and scored six goals in three years.

James joined St Johnstone just prior to the 2005–06 season. He scored his first goal for the club on 15 October 2005, in a 3–1 win over Brechin City at McDiarmid Park.

In April 2007, James was one of three St Johnstone players named in the SPFA's Scottish Division One "Team of the Year", voted for by the managers.

Going into the 2008–09 season, appearances by James were limited due to a series of injuries although he did make an appearance for the St Johnstone reserves against Arbroath, St Johnstone going on to lose 2–0.

James moved to Ayr United on a 28-day emergency loan in March 2009 as he attempted to regain fitness following injury. He returned to St Johnstone in April, missing Ayr's successful promotion to the Scottish First Division, though he failed to make another first-team appearance for St Johnstone and was released at the end of the season. He signed a one-year deal with Ayr on 4 June 2009. He then left the club at the end of the 2009–10 season.

== International career ==
James received one cap for the Scotland national under-21 football team in 1997.

== Honours ==
Airdrieonians

- Scottish Challenge Cup: 2001–02

Falkirk

- Scottish Challenge Cup: 1997-98
