= Gary O'Connor =

Scottish footballer

Personal information
- Full name: Gary O'Connor
- Date of birth: 7 April 1974 (age 52)
- Place of birth: Newtongrange, Scotland
- Position: Goalkeeper

Youth career
- 1991–1992: Dalkeith Thistle

Senior career*
Years	Team	Apps	(Gls)
1993–1994	Berwick Rangers	39	(0)
1994–1996	Heart of Midlothian	3	(0)
1996–1997	Doncaster Rovers	26	(0)
1997	Partick Thistle	3	(0)
1997–2001	Berwick Rangers	107	(0)
2001–2003	Cowdenbeath	45	(0)
2003–2004	East Fife	34	(0)
2004–2008	Berwick Rangers	107	(0)
2008	→ East Stirlingshire (loan)	13	(0)
2008–2010	Raith Rovers	8	(0)
2010–2011	Berwick Rangers	1	(0)
- Newtongrange Star
- * Club domestic league appearances and goals

Gary O'Connor (born 7 April 1974) was a Scottish football goalkeeper.

He retired on Tuesday 4 May 2010, having been given a game in Raith's last game of the season at home to Ross County to say goodbye 3 days earlier.
