= Vítězslav Mooc =

Czech footballer

Personal information
- Date of birth: 4 January 1978 (age 47)
- Place of birth: Czechoslovakia
- Height: 1.83 m (6 ft 0 in)
- Position(s): Striker

Senior career*
Years	Team	Apps	(Gls)
1994–1995	Vítkovice		
1995–1996	TJ Slezan Frýdek-Místek		
1996–1997	SK Rapid Muglinov		
1997–1998	HK Přerov		
1998	FK Kofola Krnov		
1998–2002	Vítkovice	74	(10)
2002–2004	Hradec Králové	27	(0)
2004	RKS Radomsko	11	(3)
2005	KSZO Ostrowiec	12	(1)
2005	Podbeskidzie Bielsko-Biała	0	(0)
2006	Fotbal Fulnek		
2007	Negeri Sembilan		
2007–2008	Slavoj Trebišov		
2008	Partick Thistle	3	(0)
2009	MFK Havířov		
2009–2010	Fotbal Fulnek		
2010	FK Jakartovice		
2010–2011	Bospor Bohumín		
2011–2015	FC Heřmanice		
2015–2018	Frøya FK		
2018–2019	SK Hrachovec		
- *Club domestic league appearances and goals

Vítězslav Mooc (born 4 January 1978) is a Czech former professional footballer who played as a striker.

He played for Hradec Králové in the Czech First League as well as in the second tier of Polish football. The striker was given a six-month deal by Partick Thistle manager Ian McCall following a 3-week trial. Before joining Thistle, he played for Slavoj Trebišov. His playing career saw him play in Poland, the Czech Republic, Malaysia and then Scotland. He was released by Thistle in May 2008.
