= Sean Kilgannon =

Scottish footballer (born 1981)

Personal information
- Full name: Sean Kilgannon
- Date of birth: 8 March 1981 (age 45)
- Place of birth: Stirling, Scotland
- Position: Midfielder

Senior career*
Years	Team	Apps	(Gls)
1999–2002	Middlesbrough	1	(0)
2001–2002	→ Dunfermline Athletic (loan)	6	(0)
2002–2004	Dunfermline Athletic	42	(0)
2004–2005	Ross County	28	(1)
2005–2006	Partick Thistle	27	(1)
2006–2007	Raith Rovers	15	(0)
2007–2009	Forfar Athletic	29	(6)
2009–2011	Camelon		
Total		148	(8)
- * Club domestic league appearances and goals

Sean Kilgannon (born 8 March 1981) is a Scottish former footballer, who played for several clubs. He started his career at Premier League side Middlesbrough, where he made one appearance as a substitute against Newcastle United.
