= Lee Gardner (footballer) =

Scottish footballer (born 1970)

Personal information
- Full name: Robert Lee Gardner
- Date of birth: 11 July 1970 (age 56)
- Place of birth: Ayr, Scotland
- Position: Midfielder

Youth career
- Aberdeen Lads Club

Senior career*
Years	Team	Apps	(Gls)
1987–1991	Aberdeen	1	(0)
1991	→ Oxford United (loan)	7	(0)
1991–1993	Ayr United	18	(0)
1993–1994	Meadowbank Thistle	16	(0)
1994–1996	Arbroath	50	(9)
1996–1998	Albion Rovers	48	(15)
1998–2000	Clydebank	75	(6)
2000–2001	Alloa Athletic	6	(0)
2000–2001	→Brechin City (loan)	7	(0)
2001–2003	Airdrieonians	47	(0)
Total		275	(31)
- * Club domestic league appearances and goals

Robert Lee Gardner (born 11 July 1970) is a Scottish former footballer, who played for Aberdeen, Oxford United, Ayr United, Meadowbank Thistle, Arbroath, Albion Rovers, Clydebank, Alloa, Brechin, Airdrieonians and Airdrie United.

== Honours ==
Airdrieonians

- Scottish Challenge Cup: 2001–02
