= Simon Vella =

Footballer (born 1979)

Personal information
- Date of birth: 19 September 1979 (age 47)
- Place of birth: Westminster, England
- Position: Defender

Youth career
- Wimbledon

Senior career*
Years	Team	Apps	(Gls)
1998–1999	Wimbledon	0	(0)
1999–2001	Sutton United		
2001–2002	Stenhousemuir	12	(0)
2002	Clydebank	9	(0)
2002–2003	Airdrie United	15	(0)
2003–2004	Forfar Athletic	4	(0)
- Bo'ness United

International career
2002–2003	Malta	6	(0)
- * Club domestic league appearances and goals

Simon Vella (born 19 September 1979) is a retired footballer who played as a defender. Born in England, he represented the Malta national team at internationalvel. Vella started his career with Wimbledon before joining non-League Sutton United. He spent the rest of his club career in Scotland, playing for Stenhousemuir, Clydebank, Airdrie United, Forfar Athletic and in junior football for Bo'ness United. He joined Forfar in July 2003 after leaving Airdrie.
