= Graham McGhee =

Scottish footballer

Personal information
- Full name: Graham Henry McGhee
- Date of birth: 24 September 1981 (age 45)
- Place of birth: Coatbridge, Scotland
- Position: Defender

Team information
- Current team: Lesmahagow

Senior career*
Years	Team	Apps	(Gls)
1997–2001	Clyde	5	(0)
2001–2005	East Stirlingshire	139	(2)
2005–2007	Albion Rovers	34	(1)
2007–	Lesmahagow		
- * Club domestic league appearances and goals as of 17:38, 8 January 2009 (UTC)

Graham Henry McGhee (born 24 September 1981, in Coatbridge), is a Scottish football defender who plays for Scottish junior side Lesmahagow.

McGhee came through the Clyde youth system and captained the Under 19 and Reserve teams. McGhee made 6 appearances for the Clyde first team, before joining East Stirlingshire in 2001. He spent 4 1/2 years at Firs Park, making 151 appearances in total before signing for Albion Rovers. He dropped out of the senior game in 2007, to join Lesmahagow.
