= Allan Ferguson =

Scottish footballer

Alan James Ferguson
Personal information
- Date of birth: 24 July 1963 (age 63)
- Place of birth: Lanark, Scotland
- Height: 5 ft 11 in (1.80 m)
- Position: Goalkeeper

Youth career
- Netherdale Community

Senior career*
Years	Team	Apps	(Gls)
1987–1998	Hamilton Academical	303	(0)
1998-2000	St Johnstone	5	(0)
2001-2002	Airdrieonians	28	(0)
2002–2006	Falkirk	84	(0)
2006–2008	Stranraer	8	(0)
Total		430	(0)
- * Club domestic league appearances and goals

Allan Ferguson (born 24 July 1963 in Lanark) is a Scottish former professional goalkeeper.

== Playing career ==
Ferguson played for Hamilton for 11 seasons, making over 300 league appearances. He moved to Scottish Premier League club St Johnstone in 1998. Ferguson mainly served St Johnstone as backup to Alan Main and made only six league appearances in two seasons with the club.

He signed for Airdrie in 2000. The goalkeeper was linked with a move to Livingston in 2001, but this did not materialise. He was part of the team when they went bust in 2002. He then played for Falkirk and was part of the side which knocked Hearts out of the Scottish Cup in 2003. That same side won the Scottish First Division the same season but were not accepted by the Scottish Premier League because their ground did not meet SPL standards. Ferguson was part of the side that was promoted to the SPL in 2005.

After one further season with Falkirk, Ferguson moved to Stranraer, where he made eight appearances in two seasons.

== Honours ==
Airdrieonians

- Scottish Challenge Cup: 2001–02
