= Craig McPherson =

Scottish footballer

Personal information
- Full name: Craig McPherson
- Date of birth: 27 March 1971 (age 55)
- Place of birth: Greenock, Scotland
- Height: 5 ft 9 in (1.75 m)
- Position: Left midfielder

Team information
- Current team: Rangers Women (assistant manager)

Youth career
- Gourock Amateurs

Senior career*
Years	Team	Apps	(Gls)
1994–2000	Greenock Morton	158	(6)
2000–2001	Clyde	3	(0)
2001–2002	Airdrieonians	39	(4)
2002–2006	Falkirk	122	(2)
- * Club domestic league appearances and goals

Craig McPherson (born 27 March 1971) is a Scottish former professional footballer, who is currently assistant manager of Scottish Women's Premier League team Rangers. He played as a left-back or left-sided midfielder for clubs including Greenock Morton and Falkirk before retiring in 2006.

== Playing career ==
McPherson started his career with his hometown club Greenock Morton, where he played mainly on the left hand side of midfield, occasionally being played as a full-back by then manager Allan McGraw. McPherson then played for Clyde and Airdrieonians. He followed manager Ian McCall in moving to Falkirk after the Airdrieonians club closed in 2002. He won promotion with Falkirk in 2005 and retired after one season in the Scottish Premier League.

== Coaching career ==
McPherson returned to Falkirk, in 2009, as academy technical director.

In 2014, McPherson became assistant manager of his old club Morton, and signed a two-year extension in May 2016. After leaving Morton following Jim Duffy's sacking, McPherson became first team coach at Scottish League One side Dumbarton in September 2018, but left the club following Stephen Aitken's sacking. He then returned a fortnight later as assistant manager following Duffy's appointment as Aitken's successor.

McPherson began working with the Rangers Women's team in July 2021, as an assistant to manager Malky Thomson. Police Scotland opened an investigation in March 2023 after McPherson appeared to headbutt Celtic manager Fran Alonso following a match between the two clubs. The Scottish FA charged McPherson under its rules regarding violent conduct for the same incident, and subsequently banned him for six games.

== Honours ==
Airdrieonians

- Scottish Challenge Cup: 2001–02
