= 2003–04 Scottish Second Division =

Scottish Football League Second Division

Scottish Second Division
- Season: 2003–04
- Champions: Airdrie United
- Promoted: Airdrie United; Hamilton Academical
- Relegated: East Fife; Stenhousemuir

The 2003–04 Scottish Second Division was won by Airdrie United who, along with Hamilton Academical, were promoted to the First Division. East Fife and Stenhousemuir were relegated to the Third Division.

== Table ==
Pos	Team	Pld	W	D	L	GF	GA	GD	Pts	Promotion or relegation
1	Airdrie United (C, P)	36	20	10	6	64	36	+28	70	Promotion to the First Division
2	Hamilton Academical (P)	36	18	8	10	70	47	+23	62	Promotion to the First Division
3	Dumbarton	36	18	6	12	56	41	+15	60	
4	Greenock Morton	36	16	11	9	66	58	+8	59	
5	Berwick Rangers	36	14	6	16	61	67	−6	48	
6	Forfar Athletic	36	12	11	13	49	57	−8	47	
7	Alloa Athletic	36	12	8	16	55	55	0	44	
8	Arbroath	36	11	10	15	41	57	−16	43	
9	East Fife (R)	36	11	8	17	38	45	−7	41	Relegation to the Third Division
10	Stenhousemuir (R)	36	7	4	25	28	65	−37	25	Relegation to the Third Division

Source: "2003-2004 Second Division - SPFL Archive". SPFL.
Rules for classification: 1) points; 2) goal difference; 3) number of goals scored.
(C) Champions; (P) Promoted; (R) Relegated

== Top scorers ==
Scorer	Team	Goals
(Scotland) Gareth Hutchison	Berwick Rangers	22
(Scotland) Paul Tosh	Forfar Athletic	19
(Scotland) Brian McPhee	Hamilton Academical	18
(Scotland) Brian Carrigan	Hamilton Academical	15
(England) Peter Weatherson	Greenock Morton	15
(Scotland) Alex Williams	Greenock Morton	15
(Republic of Ireland) Owen Coyle	Airdrie United	13
(Scotland) Ross Hamilton	Alloa Athletic	13
(Scotland) Gary McCutcheon	Berwick Rangers	12
(Scotland) Alan Gow	Airdrie United	11
(Scotland) Kenny Deuchar	East Fife	11
(Scotland) Ian Little	Alloa Athletic	11

== Attendances ==
The average attendances for Scottish Second Division clubs for season 2003/04 are shown below:

Club	Average
Greenock Morton	2,945
Airdrie United	1,861
Hamilton Academical	1,403
Dumbarton	1,039
Stenhousemuir	737
East Fife	708
Forfar Athletic	663
Arbroath	625
Alloa Athletic	589
Berwick Rangers	521
