= Steve Convery =

Scottish footballer

Personal information
- Full name: Steven Convery
- Date of birth: 27 October 1972 (age 54)
- Place of birth: Glasgow, Scotland
- Date of death: 10 November 2024
- Position: Striker

Team information
- Current team: Neilston Juniors

Senior career*
Years	Team	Apps	(Gls)
1998–2003	Clyde	118	(23)
2003–2005	Hamilton Academical	28	(6)
Total		146	(29)
- * Club domestic league appearances and goals

Steven "Steve" Convery (born 27 October 1972, in Glasgow) is a Scottish former professional footballer.

Steve died suddenly on November 10, 2024. His cause of death has not been disclosed at this time.

== Career ==
Convery began his career with junior side Arthurlie, and won the Scottish Junior Cup with them in 1998, scoring a goal in the final. In the summer of 1998, he was part of the Junior revolution which swept through Clyde, being one of eleven players coming from the junior ranks to join the Bully Wee. Convery became a fan favourite during his time with Clyde, and his goals were vital in the team winning the Scottish Second Division championship in 2000.

His final few years at Clyde were disrupted by several injuries, and he left in 2003 to join Hamilton Academical, after making 139 appearances and scoring 26 goals in 5 years. He spent two years at Hamilton before returning to Arthurlie. He signed for Beith Juniors in 2006, and retired from the game in 2008 after a leg break in a match against his former team, Arthurlie. He made 15 starts and scored 3 goals in his time as a player at Beith. He is now a coach at Beith.
