= Stephen Docherty =

Scottish footballer and coach

Personal information
- Date of birth: 18 February 1976 (age 50)
- Place of birth: Glasgow, Scotland
- Position: Midfielder

Youth career
- 1992–1993: Pollok

Senior career*
Years	Team	Apps	(Gls)
1993–1997	Partick Thistle	27	(4)
1997–1999	Clydebank	59	(4)
1999–2001	Partick Thistle	30	(1)
2001–2002	Airdrieonians	19	(0)
2002–2006	Airdrie United	113	(6)
2006–2009	Bathgate Thistle		
2009–2010	Irvine Meadow		
2010–?	Pollok	11	(2)

Managerial career
- 2013: Pollok
- * Club domestic league appearances and goals

Stephen Docherty (born 18 February 1976) is a Scottish former football player and coach. He previously played in the Scottish Football League for Partick Thistle and Clydebank. He also played for both Airdrieonians and their re-inacarnation Airdrie United.

== Playing career ==
He scored the first goal for the reborn Airdrie United club, in a 1–0 win over Forfar Athletic at New Broomfield. He was also captain of the club and was inducted into the Airdrie United "Hall of Fame" in 2007.

Docherty dropped down to junior level, joining Bathgate Thistle in 2006. He was part of the Bathgate team that defeated Cumnock Juniors 2–1 to win the 2008 Scottish Junior Cup Final, assisting Paul McGrillen's winning goal. After two and a half years at Bathgate, he joined Irvine Meadow in January 2009.

He made his Scotland junior international debut, picking up player of the tournament in Quad home nations tournament in the Isle of Man.

== Managerial career ==
Docherty was appointed as assistant manager of Pollok. He left the club following a disagreement with manager John Richardson, but returned to the role six weeks later in March 2013. When Richardson left the club in September 2013, Docherty took over as caretaker manager and was widely expected to be given the job permanently; when the club only invited him to apply along with other candidates, a number of players threatened to leave the club. Pollok changed their mind and appointed Docherty as manager in October, with Brian McGinty as his assistant. However, he resigned in December 2013 after taking only three points from five league matches.

In June 2020, Docherty was announced as an assistant to Stephen Robertson with Yoker Athletic's newly launched under-20 development squad. They left the club having never taken charge of a match due to the COVID-19 pandemic. Docherty subsequently joined the coaching staff at Caledonian Amateur League club St Joseph's in April 2021.

== Honours ==
Airdrieonians/Partick Thistle/Clydebank FC

- Scottish Challenge Cup: 2001–02
- Scottish 2nd Division Champions 2003/2004
- Scottish Challenge Cup Runners up 2003/2004
- Scottish 2nd Division Champions 2000/2001
- Scottish 2nd Division promotion 1999/2000
