= Alan Gow =

Scottish footballer

Personal information
- Full name: Alan Gow
- Date of birth: 9 October 1982 (age 44)
- Place of birth: Clydebank, Scotland
- Height: 1.83 m (6 ft 0 in)
- Positions: Forward; midfielder

Team information
- Current team: Airdrieonians (academy director )

Senior career*
Years	Team	Apps	(Gls)
2000–2002	Clydebank	7	(0)
2002–2005	Airdrie United	102	(28)
2005–2007	Falkirk	70	(13)
2007–2009	Rangers	0	(0)
2008	→ Blackpool (loan)	17	(5)
2009	→ Norwich City (loan)	13	(0)
2009–2010	Plymouth Argyle	14	(2)
2010	→ Hibernian (loan)	7	(1)
2010–2011	Motherwell	15	(2)
2011	Notts County	16	(2)
2011–2012	East Bengal	10	(5)
2012–2014	Exeter City	58	(14)
2014	→ Bristol Rovers (loan)	4	(0)
2015–2016	St Mirren	16	(0)
Total		352	(79)

International career
2007	Scotland B	1	(1)
- * Club domestic league appearances and goals

Alan Gow (born 9 October 1982) is a Scottish former footballer. As a player he played as either a striker or an attacking midfielder. He is currently under-18s manager of Airdrieonians.

Gow started his senior career with his hometown club Clydebank, and continued with Airdrie United after they took over the league place and assets of Clydebank in 2002. He then moved to Scottish Premier League club Falkirk in 2005, and his performances there earned him a transfer to Rangers. Gow failed to break into the Rangers first team, however, and after loan spells with Blackpool and Norwich City, he moved to Football League Championship club Plymouth Argyle. Gow fell out of favour at Plymouth after a managerial change; he was loaned to Hibernian and was then released from his contract during the 2010 close season. He then played for Motherwell and Notts County during the 2010–11 season. In 2011–12, Gow played for I-League club East Bengal in India. In 2012, he then signed for Exeter City and scored 14 goals in 58 appearances.

== Club career ==
=== Early career ===
Born in Clydebank and a pupil at Braidfield High School, Gow started his career at Yoker Boys Club before joining Clydebank, his hometown club. He joined Airdrie United on 30 August 2002, after Airdrie had acquired Clydebank's place in the Scottish Football League. Gow turned out for Clydebank in a special friendly to mark the club's rebirth in 2003. He played for Airdrie for three years, helping them to win the Scottish Second Division championship in 2004. He played in 98 matches and scored 33 goals for Airdrie.

=== Falkirk ===
Gow joined Falkirk in June 2005, following their promotion to the Scottish Premier League from the Scottish First Division in the 2004–05 season, on a two-year contract where he became an important member of their squad, helping them retain their SPL status in 2005–06. His performances in the 2006–07 season led to interest from Rangers, Celtic, Hibernian, Aberdeen. English club Wolverhampton Wanderers also had a bid turned down for Gow. On New Year's Day 2007 he scored a hat-trick as Falkirk won 5–1 at Dundee United, which led to the club's manager John Hughes saying of him, "I think he is destined for the Premiership". He also tipped him to earn a full Scotland cap.

Gow marked his 81st and final appearance for the Bairns by scoring in a 3–0 win against relegated Dunfermline Athletic.

=== Rangers ===
On 26 January 2007, Falkirk turned down an improved bid from Gow's boyhood heroes Rangers for the striker. While the first offer was £100,000, Falkirk manager John Hughes was said to have been holding out for £500,000 in the hope of selling him before he could leave on a free transfer in the summer. After failed late attempts to sign Gow before the January transfer window closed, Rangers signed him for three years on a pre-contract agreement for him to join the club in the summer.

After being granted special permission by Falkirk, Gow made his Rangers debut in a post-season friendly match against MLS club Los Angeles Galaxy at the Home Depot Center in Los Angeles, United States, coming on as a half time substitute for Nacho Novo. His first competitive match was four months later, on 26 September 2007, when he played in a League Cup match against East Fife.

On 17 June 2008, English Championship club, Burnley accepted a £3 million offer from Rangers for striker Kyle Lafferty, with Gow due to go the other way as part of the deal. However, Gow opted to stay with Rangers, but the deal for Lafferty still went ahead. Later in June, Gow visited Carrow Road to have talks over a possible move to another Championship club, Norwich City. Despite the player and his agent expressing interest in the move, the club did not pursue its interest in Gow.

==== Blackpool loan move ====
On 31 August 2008 he was linked with a move to Burnley's Lancashire rivals Blackpool. And on 1 September 2008 he signed for the Seasiders on loan until 1 January 2009, with a set fee already in place to sign him permanently should he impress. Gow said of the move, "Obviously it hasn't worked out the way I thought it should have at Rangers but I need to go out, play some games and get my fitness back." He also confirmed that SPL club Hearts had been interested in signing him. He scored his first goal for the Seasiders on 4 October 2008 against Cardiff City. After coming on as a substitute in the 77th minute he scored the equaliser deep into the fifth minute of injury time as the clubs drew 1–1 at Bloomfield Road.

He made his first start for the Seasiders on 21 October 2008 scoring a goal as Blackpool beat Derby County 3–2 at Bloomfield Road. With long-term injuries to two of the club's strikers, Daniel Nardiello and Stephen McPhee, coupled with a short-term injury to Steve Kabba, Gow was used as a striker. And after scoring his third goal in eight games for the Seasiders, when he again struck in injury time, in the 92nd minute, to seal a 4–3 win over Watford at Vicarage Road, the club's manager Simon Grayson confirmed that he wanted to sign Gow permanently. Grayson said of him, "When he keeps performing like that, we'd like to get something sorted. He had opportunities to go to Norwich and Birmingham and turned them down and came here. There's a fee agreed with Rangers and we've talked about it in the last few weeks." At the end of his loan spell, on 31 December 2008 he returned to Rangers.

In January 2009 Rangers confirmed that they were in negotiations with Wolverhampton Wanderers over a proposed move for the player. Gow agreed to join the Championship side in a two-and-a-half-year deal on 6 January 2009 for an undisclosed fee, around £250,000, pending a medical, however the medical subsequently revealed an issue that caused Wolves to pull out of the deal.

==== Norwich City loan move ====
On 2 February 2009, Gow joined Norwich City on loan until the end of the season. He made his debut for the club as a substitute in a 3–3 draw away to Wolverhampton Wanderers – whom he almost joined earlier in the transfer window – the following day.

=== Plymouth Argyle ===
Rangers accepted a £200,000 bid for the player from Plymouth Argyle in August 2009. Gow completed the deal on 14 August, signing a two-year contract with the Championship side. He scored his first goal during his debut in a 3–1 home defeat to Cardiff due to a late penalty given away by former Argyle player Tony Capaldi, who received a second yellow card for the offence. He scored again in his second appearance for the club against Sheffield Wednesday.

Gow fell out of favour at Plymouth after the departure of manager Paul Sturrock. On 1 February 2010, Gow joined Hibernian on loan until the end of the season. SPL rivals Hearts and Aberdeen were also interested in signing Gow, but his relationship with manager John Hughes, who had previously managed him at Falkirk, influenced Gow in his decision. Gow scored a goal on his debut for Hibs, the final goal in a 5–1 Scottish Cup win against Montrose. He subsequently suffered from hamstring injuries, which restricted his appearances. Gow expressed a desire to stay at Hibs and to leave Plymouth permanently, but he was returned to Plymouth at the end of the loan. Gow was released by Plymouth in July 2010.

=== Motherwell ===
It was reported by the Swindon Advertiser that Gow had agreed personal terms and completed a medical with Football League One club Swindon Town on 30 August 2010, before demanding a "considerable rise" on the agreed basic wage. Swindon Town director Jeremy Wray commented:

he was trying to improve it [his contract] before he had even pulled on a Swindon shirt and kicked a ball for the club. That is a disgrace.

Three days later, Gow signed for SPL club Motherwell on a six-month deal.

After signing for Motherwell, Gow responded to the criticism from Swindon by stating that he had not agreed a contract with them. He also stated that he had merely travelled there to discuss their offer and had left after he found that he "wasn't happy with the deal". Gow cited the presence of Archie Knox as being one of the positive reasons for signing for Motherwell, while conceding that he had made mistakes earlier in his career in his choice of clubs. He then made his Motherwell debut on 11 September, as a substitute against St Johnstone. He scored his first goal for the club when he scored a late winning goal against Dundee United, in a League Cup tie on 26 October 2010. He would only score one other goal during his time at the Fir Park club, with new Motherwell manager Stuart McCall then deciding against offering Gow a new deal.

=== Notts County ===
Gow signed for Notts County on 14 January 2011. He then made his debut in the 0–0 draw away to Southampton. Gow scored a goal for Notts County away to Tranmere Rovers on 5 February 2011, but the match was abandoned early in the second half. Gow was released on 16 May, along with eight other players.

=== East Bengal ===
Gow was offered a one-year contract by Indian club East Bengal, and he travelled there for a trial assessment in July 2011. Gow agreed to join the club in August 2011, with the move subject to his visa application being approved. On 13 January 2012, East Bengal FC released Gow from the club. Gow then entered contract negotiations with Iranian club Rah Ahan, despite the UK Government advising him not to travel there.

=== Exeter City ===
On 22 March 2012, Gow completed a move to Exeter City on a deal until the end of the season. He scored his first goals for Exeter in a 4–2 win over Walsall on 21 April 2012.

Gow signed a new two-year contract with Exeter City in May 2012, but his deal was not renewed and he was released by the club in the summer of 2014.

==== Bristol Rovers Loan ====
On 7 February 2014, Gow joined Bristol Rovers on loan for the remainder of the 2013–14 season with Eliot Richards joining Exeter City on loan in the opposite direction. However, during a match against Scunthorpe United on 25 February, Gow was stretchered off suffering ligament damage leaving him unable to play for around six weeks.

=== St Mirren ===
Gow signed for St Mirren on 20 February 2015, until the end of season 2014–15. He made his debut on 28 February in a 1–0 home win against Hamilton Academical. Gow signed a new one-year deal with the club on 16 June 2015. He was released by St Mirren at the end of the 2015/16 season.

=== Queen's Park ===
After two seasons out of senior football, Gow signed for Scottish League Two side Queen's Park in December 2018, having spent time on trial with the club and league rivals Stirling Albion.

== Statistics ==
As of 6 January 2019

Club	Season	League			National Cup		League Cup		Continental		Other		Total	
Club	Season	Division	Apps	Goals	Apps	Goals	Apps	Goals	Apps	Goals	Apps	Goals	Apps	Goals
Clydebank	2000–01	Scottish Second Division	2	0	0	0	0	0	-	-	-	-	2	0
Clydebank	2001–02	Scottish Second Division	5	0	0	0	0	0	-	-	1	0	6	0
Clydebank	Total		7	0	0	0	0	0	-	-	1	0	8	0
Airdrie United	2002–03	Scottish Second Division 2002-2004 Scottish First Division 2004-2005	27	5	2	1	2	0	-	-	-	-	31	6
Airdrie United	2003–04	Scottish Second Division 2002-2004 Scottish First Division 2004-2005	32	11	2	0	2	0	-	-	3	0	39	11
Airdrie United	2004–05	Scottish Second Division 2002-2004 Scottish First Division 2004-2005	25	9	0	0	2	0	-	-	1	0	28	9
Airdrie United	Total		84	25	4	1	6	0	-	-	4	0	98	26
Falkirk	2005–06	Scottish Premier League	34	6	4	3	2	1	-	-	-	-	40	10
Falkirk	2006–07	Scottish Premier League	36	7	2	1	3	0	-	-	-	0	41	8
Falkirk	Total		70	13	6	4	5	1	-	-	-	-	81	18
Rangers	2007–08	Scottish Premier League	0	0	1	0	1	0	0	0	-	-	2	0
Blackpool (loan)	2008–09	Championship	17	5	0	0	0	0	-	-	-	-	17	5
Norwich City (loan)	2008–09	Championship	13	0	0	0	0	0	-	-	-	-	13	0
Plymouth Argyle	2009–10	Championship	14	2	0	0	0	0	-	-	-	-	14	2
Hibernian (loan)	2009–10	Scottish Premier League	7	0	1	1	0	0	-	-	-	-	8	1
Motherwell	2010–11	Scottish Premier League	9	1	0	0	2	1	0	0	-	-	11	2
Notts County	2010–11	League One	16	1	2	0	0	0	-	-	-	-	18	1
East Bengal	2011–12	I-League	5	2	3	3	0	0	-	-	-	-	8	5
Exeter City	2011–12	League One	7	3	0	0	0	0	-	-	-	-	7	3
Exeter City	2012–13	League Two	26	4	1	0	1	0	-	-	1	0	29	4
Exeter City	2013–14	League Two	25	7	1	0	1	0	-	-	1	0	28	7
Exeter City	Total		58	14	2	0	2	0	-	-	2	0	64	14
Bristol Rovers (loan)	2013–14	League Two	4	0	0	0	0	0	-	-	-	-	4	0
St Mirren	2014–15	Scottish Premiership	8	0	0	0	0	0	-	-	-	-	8	0
St Mirren	2015–16	Scottish Championship	8	0	0	0	0	0	-	-	1	1	9	1
St Mirren	Total		16	0	0	0	0	0	-	-	1	1	17	1
Stirling Albion (trial)	2018–19	Scottish League Two	2	0	0	0	0	0	-	-	0	0	2	0
Queen's Park	2018–19	Scottish League Two	4	0	0	0	0	0	-	-	0	0	4	0
Career total			326	63	19	9	16	2	0	0	8	1	369	75

== International career ==
On 30 January 2007, Alex McLeish named Gow in the Scotland B team to play Finland B at Rugby Park, Kilmarnock on 7 February. Gow came on as a substitute in the 61st minute and scored three minutes later as the teams drew 2–2.

== Post-career ==
On 25 August 2020, Gow was named as head of football operations at his former club Falkirk.

In July 2022, he returned to another of his former clubs in Airdrieonians, appointed manager of the newly reformed academy team.
