= Paul Armstrong (Irish footballer) =

Irish footballer

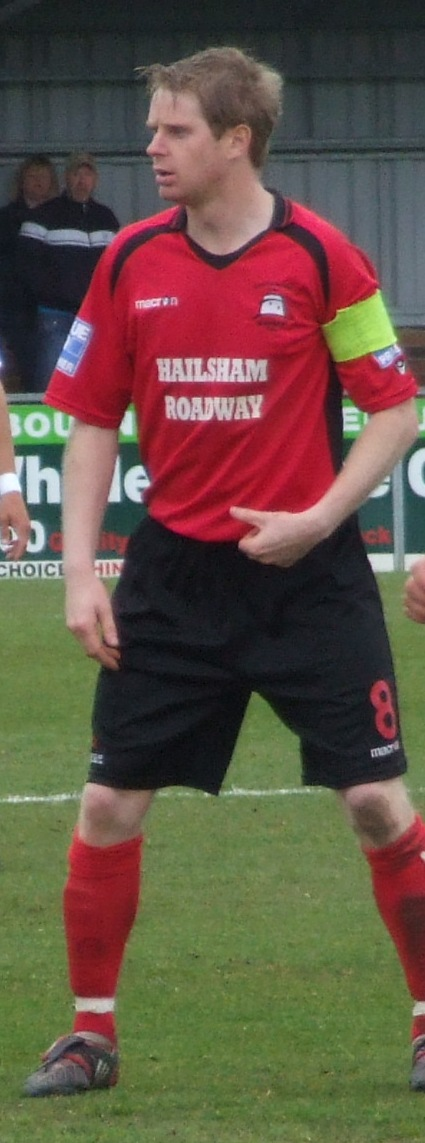
- Armstrong playing for Eastbourne Borough

Personal information
- Full name: Paul George Armstrong
- Date of birth: 5 October 1978 (age 48)
- Place of birth: Dublin, Republic of Ireland
- Position: Midfielder

Youth career
- –1997: Brighton & Hove Albion

Senior career*
Years	Team	Apps	(Gls)
1997–2000	Brighton & Hove Albion	56	(2)
2000–2002	Airdrieonians	70	(1)
2002–2003	Airdrie United	42	(2)
2003–2006	Crawley Town	60	(6)
2006–2010	Eastbourne Borough	149	(31)
2010–2013	Whitehawk	42	(11)
2013	→ Lancing		
Total		419	(53)

International career
1995	Republic of Ireland under-18	1	(0)
1998	Republic of Ireland under-21	1	(0)
- * Club domestic league appearances and goals

Paul George Armstrong (born 5 October 1978) is an Irish former professional footballer who played mainly as a midfielder. Armstrong played in both professional and semi-professional teams in England and Scotland and had international appearances for the Republic of Ireland U18 and U21 teams.

== Playing career ==
=== Brighton and Hove Albion ===
Armstrong started his career as a junior for Brighton & Hove Albion youth team, progressing into the first team in 1997. In March 1998, he was picked for the Republic of Ireland under-21 team for a friendly game against the Czech Republic. Armstrong scored his first senior goal from a penalty in a game against Chester City in January 1999. Armstrong made over 50 league appearances with Brighton and Hove until he was released by Micky Adams in 2000.

=== Airdrieonians and Airdrie United ===
He transferred to the Scottish leagues as a defender for Airdrieonians (see The Last Ever Airdrieonians Team) in the Scottish First Division, winning the Scottish Challenge Cup in the first two seasons he was there; Armstrong was the only player to play in both finals. In his second season with Airdrieonians, he helped the team finish second place in the First Division, but the club suffered serious financial problems and was liquidated on 1 May 2002.

An Airdrie club was re-incarnated as Airdrie United by taking over Clydebank after their initial bid to stay in the Scottish Football League was given instead to Gretna. Armstrong had a trial at Stranraer during the summer of 2002, but he decided to sign to Airdrie United for a season. Airdrie missed out on promotion back to the First Division by a single point to Brechin. Armstrong scored 2 goals in 42 games for the new club before moving back to Sussex.

=== Crawley Town ===
Armstrong joined Crawley Town in 2003, then playing in the Southern League although a change in management saw Francis Vines take over and saw the club being promoted into the Conference National at the end of the 2003/04 season. However, after three years at Crawley, the club suffered a financial crisis and went into administration in 2006, with many players leaving to join new clubs after not being paid for weeks. Armstrong decided not to stay after 6 goals in 60 appearances with the club.

=== Eastbourne Borough ===
Armstrong joined Eastbourne Borough from local Sussex team Crawley Town on 18 June 2006. He was made club captain, bringing success to Eastbourne as they were promoted into the Conference National from the Conference South at the end of the 2007–08 season via the play-offs, against Hampton & Richmond.

Armstrong made several first team starts in the 2008/09 season with Eastbourne in the Conference National until he was attacked outside a pub in Crawley, in late December 2008, causing a near-fatal blood clot in the brain, however he was lucky to recover and later helped Eastbourne complete their first season in the Conference and also the Sussex Senior Cup at the end of the season.

=== Whitehawk ===
At the end of the 2009–10 season, Armstrong was released by Eastbourne Borough and signed for Brighton-based Whitehawk, where he was made captain. Armstrong was an ever present in his first season, scoring 11 times as the newly promoted Hawks reached the Isthmian League South Division play-offs. The following season he captained the side to the Isthmian League South Division title and a Sussex Senior Cup final win at Falmer Stadium against Crawley Down. Armstrong retired from playing after winning the Isthmian League Premier Division with the Hawks in 2012–13. During that season he also appeared for Lancing.

In May 2014 Armstrong was appointed Youth Team Manager at Burgess Hill Town.

== Honours ==
Airdrieonians

- Scottish Challenge Cup: 2000–01, 2001–02

Crawley Town

- Southern League Cup Winners 2002–03, 2003–04
- Southern League Championship Trophy 2003–04, 2004–05
- Southern League Champions 2003–04

Eastbourne Borough

- Conference South Play-off winners 2004–05, 2007–08

Whitehawk

- Isthmian League South Division winners 2011-12
- Isthmian League Premier Division winners 2012-13
