= Scott Chaplain =

Scottish footballer

Personal information
- Full name: Scott Chaplain
- Date of birth: 10 September 1983 (age 43)
- Place of birth: Bellshill, Scotland
- Position: Midfielder

Team information
- Current team: Scotland national futsal team (Head Coach)

Youth career
- Rangers

Senior career*
Years	Team	Apps	(Gls)
2000–2005	Ayr United	110	(11)
2005–2007	Albion Rovers	64	(26)
2007–2009	Partick Thistle	58	(6)
2009–2011	Dumbarton	43	(12)
2011–2012	Albion Rovers	47	(15)
2012–2013	Annan Athletic	36	(11)
2013–2015	Albion Rovers	52	(19)
Total		385	(100)
- * Club domestic league appearances and goals as of 27 November 2014

Scott Chaplain (born 10 September 1983, in Bellshill) is a Scottish retired professional footballer. He last played for Albion Rovers in their 2014–15 Scottish League Two winning season.

Chaplain began his career in the Rangers youth set-up before moving on to Ayr United in 2000. He made 91 starts and scored 11 goals in his 5 seasons at the club before being released and signing for Albion Rovers. In the 2006–07 season he scored 18 league goals and won the SPFA's player of the year award for the Third Division. At the end of the season, he was signed on a full-time contract by Partick Thistle manager Ian McCall.

After leaving Partick Thistle in the summer of 2009, Chaplain was signed by Dumbarton. He rejoined Albion Rovers in January 2011, helping them win promotion to the Second Division. He scored the goal that got Rovers into the play-off final, and in that final against Stranraer he scored two goals as the club retained their place in the third tier.

In 2012, Chaplain left Albion Rovers to join Third Division side Annan Athletic but once again signed for Albion Rovers in May 2013. He was part of the Rovers team that reached the last eight of the 2013–14 Scottish Cup, and scored ten goals from midfield in the 2014–15 season, when Albion Rovers won the League Two title. Chaplain retired from football in June 2015, having been offered a position with the Scottish Football Association.

He has also played for the Scotland national futsal team and became their coach in February 2018 and has led the side to three wins in four games, one of which gave the national side their first ever clean sheet.
