= Stuart Taylor (footballer, born 1974) =

Scottish footballer

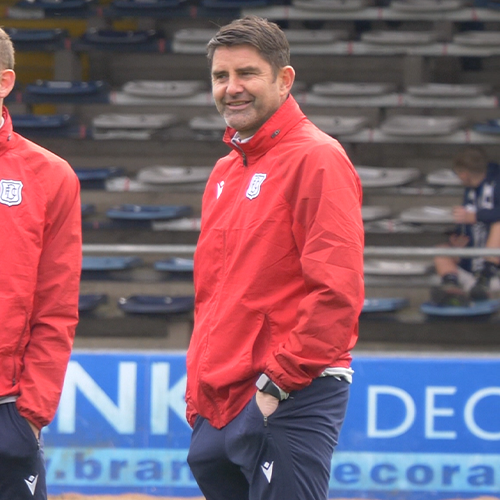
- Stuart Taylor during a Dundee warm-up in 2024

Personal information
- Date of birth: 26 November 1974 (age 51)
- Place of birth: Glasgow, Scotland
- Position: Midfielder

Team information
- Current team: Maccabi Tel Aviv (assistant)

Senior career*
Years	Team	Apps	(Gls)
1992–1998	St Mirren	79	(8)
1998–2002	Airdrieonians	85	(14)
2002–2003	Drogheda United	22	(2)
2003	Falkirk	13	(7)
2003–2004	Partick Thistle	13	(1)
2004–2005	St Johnstone	9	(1)
2005–2006	Ross County	13	(1)
2006–2007	Airdrie United	36	(4)
2007–2009	Hamilton Academical	16	(4)

Managerial career
- 2007–2011: Hamilton Academical (assistant)
- 2012–2013: Al-Khor Sports Club (assistant)
- 2013–2014: Limerick
- 2014-2016: Aston Villa (Under 23 Head coach)
- 2016-2017: Wolverhampton Wanderers (Assistant)
- 2018: Stoke City (assistant)
- 2018–2021: Ipswich Town (assistant)
- 2021–2022: Hamilton Academical
- 2023–2025: Dundee (assistant)
- 2026: St Mirren (assistant)
- 2026–: Maccabi Tel Aviv (assistant)
- * Club domestic league appearances and goals

Stuart Taylor (born 26 November 1974) is a Scottish professional football former player and coach, who is currently assistant coach at Israeli Premier League club Maccabi Tel Aviv. Taylor played for several clubs in Scotland, and Drogheda United in Ireland, between 1992 and 2009. He then became a coach, and has since managed Limerick and Hamilton Academical.

== Club career ==
In July 2002 Taylor signed for Drogheda United and made his League of Ireland debut on the opening day of the 2002–03 League of Ireland season. In his next game he scored his first goal at Tolka Park.

== Coaching career ==
Taylor began his coaching career at Hamilton Academical, where he joined as assistant manager to Billy Reid from 2007 to 2011, when the club won the Scottish First Division and promotion to the Scottish Premier League.

In August 2012, he joined Al-Khor Sports Club in Qatar as assistant manager to László Bölöni.

In January 2013, Taylor was appointed manager of Limerick on a three-year deal. Taylor resigned as the manager of Limerick in July 2014. Taylor then joined Aston Villa in July 2014 as Under-23 head coach.

He joined Paul Lambert as first team coach at Wolverhampton Wanderers in November 2016. Taylor and most of Lambert's back-room staff left the club in May 2017. He once again joined up with Lambert as his assistant manager at Stoke City in January 2018. He left Stoke at the end of the 2017–18 season as Lambert also left the club. Taylor joined up with Lambert for the third time as his assistant manager at Ipswich Town in October 2018. He left Ipswich along with manager Paul Lambert in February 2021.

After a short spell with Ross County, Taylor became head coach of Hamilton Academical in August 2021. He left Hamilton in June 2022.

In June 2023, Taylor was announced as the new assistant manager of Scottish Premiership club Dundee alongside new manager Tony Docherty. After two seasons with the Dark Blues which included a top six finish and a 10th place finish the following season, Taylor was sacked along with Docherty at the end of the 2024–25 season.

On 28 March 2026, Taylor joined Scottish Premiership side St Mirren as interim assistant manager under interim head coach Craig McLeish.

On 23 June 2026, Taylor joined Israeli Premier League side Maccabi Tel Aviv as assistant coach under head coach Kenny Miller.

== Career statistics ==
=== Managerial statistics ===
As of match played 29 April 2022

Managerial record by team and tenure
Team	From	To	Record				
Team	From	To	P	W	D	L	Win %
Limerick	11 January 2013	7 July 2014	51	16	14	21	31.4
Hamilton Academical	20 August 2021	23 June 2022	37	11	11	15	29.7
Total			88	27	25	36	30.7

== Honours ==
Airdrieonians

- Scottish Challenge Cup: 2001–02

Falkirk FC. League Championship winners 2002/03 season.

Hamilton Academical FC. League Championship winners. 2007/08 season.
