= Stephen McKeown =

Scottish footballer

Personal information
- Full name: Stephen James McKeown
- Date of birth: 17 July 1981 (age 45)
- Place of birth: Rutherglen, Scotland
- Positions: Midfielder; striker

Team information
- Current team: Irvine Meadow

Youth career
- Cathkin United
- 1997–1998: Airdrieonians

Senior career*
Years	Team	Apps	(Gls)
1998–2002	Airdrieonians	34	(4)
2002–2008	Airdrie United	154	(33)
2008–2010	Partick Thistle	54	(6)
2010	Ayr United	4	(0)
2011	Airdrie United	5	(0)
2012	Pollok FC		
2013	Irvine Meadow		
- * Club domestic league appearances and goals as of 21 January 2012

Stephen James McKeown (born 17 July 1981) is a Scottish retired footballer who played as an attacking midfielder.

== Career ==
McKeown was raised in the Fernhill district of Rutherglen and attended Trinity High School in the town.

He joined Airdrieonians at the age of 16 from a local boys' club on the recommendation of Sandy Stewart, spending four years with that version of the club and six more with its successor Airdrie United from its inception in 2002. At one point he lost his enjoyment for football and was ready to quit the game, but recanted after advice from Stewart and his father. In 2006 he scored a late penalty as Airdrie eliminated top-division Dunfermline from the Scottish Cup.

McKeown signed for Partick Thistle of the First Division at the opening of the January transfer window of 2008. Soon after joining, he scored against Rangers in a League Cup tie. He joined Ayr United after leaving Partick in summer 2010 on a free transfer.

McKeown was released from his contract at Ayr following a training ground incident and rejoined Airdrie United in January 2011. He lasted two months at the Diamonds before leaving the club, citing commitments away from football as the reason.

He later joined Junior club Pollok FC in January 2012 and made his first start for the club in the Emirates Scottish Junior Cup Fourth Round. On 28 September 2013, McKeown joined Irvine Meadow, also of the Junior grade.

== Personal life ==
His nieces Kodie Hay and Brogan Hay are also footballers who play for Glasgow City.
