= 1991–92 Heart of Midlothian F.C. season =

Heart of Midlothian
1991–92 season
- Chairman: Wallace Mercer
- Manager: Joe Jordan
- Stadium: Tynecastle Stadium
- Scottish Premier Division: 2nd
- Scottish Cup: Semi-final Replay
- League Cup: Quarter-final
- Top goalscorer: League: John Robertson (14); All: John Robertson (20)
- Highest home attendance: 24,356 v Rangers Scottish Premier Division 1 February 1992
- Lowest home attendance: 5,310 v Airdrieonians Scottish Premier Division 25 April 1992
- Average home league attendance: 13,317

The 1991–92 season was Heart of Midlothian F.C.'s 9th consecutive season of play in the Scottish Premier Division. Hearts also competed in the Scottish Cup & the Scottish League Cup.

== Fixtures ==
=== Friendlies ===
27 July 1991 Friendly	Morton	0–3	Hearts
			Robertson Crabbe Melrose	Attendance: 1,499

31 July 1991 Friendly	Raith Rovers	1–4	Hearts
	Goal		Robertson Crabbe McKinlay McPherson	Attendance: 2,200

3 August 1991 Friendly	Hearts	3–1	Real Sociedad
	Crabbe Baird Robertson		Goal	Attendance: 7,677

=== League Cup ===
20 August 1991 League Cup R2	Hearts	3–0	Clydebank	Tynecastle Stadium
	Crabbe 18' Baird 28' Robertson 32'			Attendance: 7,867; Referee: DA Yeats

28 August 1991 League Cup R3	Hamilton	0–2	Hearts	Douglas Park
			Robertson 49' (pen.) Baird 82'	Attendance: 4,006; Referee: Hugh Williamson

4 September 1991 League Cup QF	Hearts	0–1	Rangers	Tynecastle Stadium
			McCoist 25'	Attendance: 22,878; Referee: DD Hope

=== Scottish Cup ===
25 January 1992 Scottish Cup R3	St Mirren	0–0	Hearts	Love Street
				Attendance: 8,952

25 February 1992 Scottish Cup R3 Replay	Hearts	3–0	St Mirren	Tynecastle Stadium
	Robertson			Attendance: 12,130

15 February 1992 Scottish Cup R4	Dunfermline	1–2	Hearts	East End Park
	Davies 2'		Hogg 11' Crabbe 88'	Attendance: 12,882

8 March 1992 Scottish Cup QF	Hearts	3–1	Falkirk	Tynecastle Stadium
	Ferguson Robertson Mackay		McGivern	Attendance: 11,227

4 April 1992 Scottish Cup SF	Airdrieonians	0–0	Hearts	Hampden Park
				Attendance: 27,310

14 April 1992 Scottish Cup SF Replay	Hearts	1–1 (2 – 4 pen.)	Airdrieonians	Hampden Park
	McLaren 91'		Black	Attendance: 11,163

=== Scottish Premier Division ===
10 August 1991 Scottish Premier Division	Dunfermline	1–2	Hearts	East End Park
	Farningham 81'		Crabbe 4'; Robertson 65'	Attendance: 10,736; Referee: Hugh Williamson

13 August 1991 Scottish Premier Division	Airdrieonians	2–3	Hearts	Broomfield Park
	Conn 5'; Lawrence 56' (pen.)		Robertson 20' (34), pen.' Baird 48'	Attendance: 6,326; Referee: Gerry Evans

17 August 1991 Scottish Premier Division	Hearts	1–0	Rangers	Tynecastle Stadium
	Crabbe 1'			Attendance: 22,534

24 August 1991 Scottish Premier Division	St Johnstone	0–1	Hearts	McDiarmid Park
			Levein	Attendance: 7,516

31 August 1991 Scottish Premier Division	Hearts	0–0	Hibs	Tynecastle Stadium
				Attendance: 22,208

7 September 1991 Scottish Premier Division	Hearts	2–0	Motherwell	Tynecastle Stadium
	Crabbe; Baird			Attendance: 9,003

14 September 1991 Scottish Premier Division	St Mirren	2–3	Hearts	Love Street
	Irvine; Charnley		Millar; McPherson; Crabbe	Attendance: 5,836

21 September 1991 Scottish Premier Division	Hearts	1–1	Dundee United	Tynecastle Stadium
	McKinlay		Ferguson	Attendance: 11,746

28 September 1991 Scottish Premier Division	Falkirk	1–2	Hearts	Brockville Park
	McAllister		Crabbe; Millar	Attendance: 8,339

5 October 1991 Scottish Premier Division	Celtic	3–1	Hearts	Celtic Park
	McNally; Nicholas; Cascarino		Robertson	Attendance: 33,621; Referee: Jim McCluskey

9 October 1991 Scottish Premier Division	Hearts	1–0	Aberdeen	Tynecastle Stadium
	Crabbe			Attendance: 15,569; Referee: DD Hope

12 October 1991 Scottish Premier Division	Hearts	1–0	Dunfermline	Tynecastle Stadium
	McLaren			Attendance: 9,002

19 October 1991 Scottish Premier Division	Rangers	2–0	Hearts	Ibrox Stadium
	McCoist; Mikhailitchenko			Attendance: 36,481

26 October 1991 Scottish Premier Division	Motherwell	0–1	Hearts	Fir Park
			Ferguson	Attendance: 5,417

30 October 1991 Scottish Premier Division	Hearts	0–0	St Mirren	Tynecastle Stadium
				Attendance: 8,683; Referee: Brian McGinlay

2 November 1991 Scottish Premier Division	Hibs	1–1	Hearts	Easter Road
	Wright 26'		Robertson 4'	Attendance: 19,831; Referee: AW Waddell

9 November 1991 Scottish Premier Division	Hearts	2–1	St Johnstone	Tynecastle Stadium
	Baird 61'; Hogg 85'		Curran 64'	Attendance: 10,222

16 November 1991 Scottish Premier Division	Hearts	3–1	Celtic	Tynecastle Stadium
	Wright 55'; Levein 60'; Crabbe 77'		Coyne 14'	Attendance: 22,666; Referee: AM Roy

20 November 1991 Scottish Premier Division	Aberdeen	0–2	Hearts	Pittodrie
			Robertson 9'; Baird	Attendance: 15,338; Referee: JR Renton

23 November 1991 Scottish Premier Division	Dundee United	0–1	Hearts	Tannadice Park
			Robertson	Attendance: 12,796

30 November 1991 Scottish Premier Division	Hearts	1–0	Airdrieonians	Tynecastle Stadium
	Crabbe 70' (pen.)			Attendance: 12,073

4 December 1991 Scottish Premier Division	Hearts	1–1	Falkirk	Tynecastle Stadium
	Crabbe		Sloan	Attendance: 11,742; Referee: DD Hope

7 December 1991 Scottish Premier Division	Dunfermline	0–2	Hearts	East End Park
			Millar; Crabbe Pen.'	Attendance: 8,774; Referee: GB Smith

14 December 1991 Scottish Premier Division	Hearts	3–1	Motherwell	Tynecastle Stadium
	Crabbe pen.' Baird 39'; Millar 45'		McCart	Attendance: 10,006; Referee: Jim McCluskey

21 December 1991 Scottish Premier Division	St Mirren	0–1	Hearts	Love Street
			Millar	Attendance: 5,216; Referee: Willie Young

28 December 1991 Scottish Premier Division	St Johnstone	0–5	Hearts	McDiarmid Park
			Baird; Robertson; Crabbe	Attendance: 10,064; Referee: Ray Morrison

1 January 1992 Scottish Premier Division	Hearts	1–1	Hibs	Tynecastle Stadium
	Ferguson 65'		McIntyre 71' (Pen.)	Attendance: 20,358; Referee: DFT Syme

4 January 1992 Scottish Premier Division	Celtic	1–2	Hearts	Celtic Park
	Collins 86'		Crabbe 59'; Millar 60'	Attendance: 30,417

11 January 1992 Scottish Premier Division	Hearts	0–4	Aberdeen	Tynecastle Stadium
			Jess; Booth; Mason	Attendance: 16,291

18 January 1992 Scottish Premier Division	Airdrieonians	2–1	Hearts	Broomfield Park
	Lawrence		Robertson	Attendance: 5,930

1 February 1992 Scottish Premier Division	Hearts	0–1	Rangers	Tynecastle Stadium
			McCoist	Attendance: 24,356

8 February 1992 Scottish Premier Division	Hearts	1–0	Dundee United	Tynecastle Stadium
	Bannon			Attendance: 10,516

29 February 1992 Scottish Premier Division	Hearts	1–2	Celtic	Tynecastle Stadium
	Robertson		Creaney	Attendance: 20,863

4 March 1992 Scottish Premier Division	Falkirk	1–2	Hearts	Brockville Park
	Smith		Mackay; Ferguson	Attendance: 6,002

14 March 1992 Scottish Premier Division	Hearts	2–0	St Johnstone	Tynecastle Stadium
	McKinlay; Millar			Attendance: 8,799

18 March 1992 Scottish Premier Division	Aberdeen	2–0	Hearts	Pittodrie
	Ten Caat; Mason			Attendance: 10,581

21 March 1992 Scottish Premier Division	Hibs	1–2	Hearts	Easter Road
	Weir		Hunter (own goal); Ferguson 76'	Attendance: 14,429

28 March 1992 Scottish Premier Division	Hearts	1–0	Dunfermline	Tynecastle Stadium
	Robertson			Attendance: 7,488

7 April 1992 Scottish Premier Division	Motherwell	0–1	Hearts	Fir Park
			Robertson	Attendance: 4,501

11 April 1992 Scottish Premier Division	Hearts	0–0	St Mirren	Tynecastle Stadium
				Attendance: 6,200

18 April 1992 Scottish Premier Division	Dundee United	2–0	Hearts	Tannadice Park
	Malpas; Ferguson			Attendance: 6,711

25 April 1992 Scottish Premier Division	Hearts	2–2	Airdrieonians	Tynecastle Stadium
	Crabbe; McPherson		Conn; Coyle	Attendance: 5,310

28 April 1992 Scottish Premier Division	Rangers	1– 1	Hearts	Ibrox Stadium
	McCoist		Robertson	Attendance: 36,129

2 May 1992 Scottish Premier Division	Hearts	2–0	Falkirk	Tynecastle Stadium
	Bannon; Ferguson			Attendance: 7,348

== Scottish Premier Division table ==
Pos	Team	Pld	W	D	L	GF	GA	GD	Pts	Qualification or relegation
1	Rangers (C)	44	33	6	5	101	31	+70	72	Qualification for the Champions League first round
2	Heart of Midlothian	44	27	9	8	60	37	+23	63	Qualification for the UEFA Cup first round
3	Celtic	44	26	10	8	88	42	+46	62	Qualification for the UEFA Cup first round
4	Dundee United	44	19	13	12	66	50	+16	51	
5	Hibernian	44	16	17	11	53	45	+8	49	Qualification for the UEFA Cup first round

Rules for classification: 1) points; 2) goal difference; 3) number of goals scored.
(C) Champions

== Stats ==
=== Squad information ===
No.	Pos	Nat	Player	Total		Scottish Premier Division		Scottish Cup		League Cup	
No.	Pos	Nat	Player	Apps	Goals	Apps	Goals	Apps	Goals	Apps	Goals
	GK	(Scotland) SCO	Henry Smith	53	0	44	0	6	0	3	0
	DF	(Scotland) SCO	Tosh McKinlay	47	2	39	2	5	0	3	0
	DF	(Scotland) SCO	Alan McLaren	45	2	38	1	6	1	1	0
	DF	(Scotland) SCO	Craig Levein	43	2	36	2	4	0	3	0
	DF	(Scotland) SCO	Dave McPherson	53	2	44	2	6	0	3	0
	DF	(Scotland) SCO	Graeme Hogg	21	2	18	1	1	1	2	0
	MF	(Scotland) SCO	John Millar	49	7	41	7	5	0	3	0
	MF	(Scotland) SCO	Gary Mackay	49	2	43	1	3	1	3	0
	MF	(Scotland) SCO	Derek Ferguson	47	1	38	1	6	0	3	0
	MF	(Scotland) SCO	George Wright	31	1	24	1	6	0	1	0
	MF	(Scotland) SCO	Tommy Harrison	2	0	1	0	0	0	1	0
	MF	(Scotland) SCO	Eamonn Bannon	18	2	13	2	5	0	0	0
	FW	(Scotland) SCO	John Robertson	51	20	42	14	6	4	3	2
	FW	(Northern Ireland) NIR	Steve Penney	11	0	9	0	1	0	1	0
	FW	(England) ENG	Wayne Foster	10	0	7	0	1	0	2	0
	FW	(England) ENG	Glynn Snodin	8	0	7	0	1	0	0	0
	FW	(Scotland) SCO	Scott Crabbe	49	17	41	15	5	1	3	1
	FW	(England) ENG	Ian Baird	36	8	30	6	3	0	3	2
	FW	(Scotland) SCO	Ian Ferguson	36	5	30	4	6	1	0	0

== Scorers ==
Pos	PLayer	SPL	SC	LC	Total
FW	(Scotland) John Robertson	14	4	2	20
FW	(Scotland) Scott Crabbe	15	1	1	17
FW	(England) Ian Baird	6	0	2	8
MF	(Scotland) John Millar	7	0	0	7
FW	(Scotland) Ian Ferguson	4	1	0	5
MF	(Scotland) Eamonn Bannon	2	0	0	2
DF	(Scotland) Craig Levein	2	0	0	2
DF	(Scotland) Tosh McKinlay	2	0	0	2
DF	(Scotland) Dave McPherson	2	0	0	2
DF	(Scotland) Gary Mackay	1	1	0	2
MF	(Scotland) Graeme Hogg	1	1	0	2
DF	(Scotland) Alan McLaren	1	1	0	2
MF	(Scotland) Derek Ferguson	1	0	0	1
MF	(Scotland) George Wright	1	0	0	1

== See also ==
- List of Heart of Midlothian F.C. seasons
