= 1989–90 Heart of Midlothian F.C. season =

Heart of Midlothian
1989–90 season
- Chairman: Wallace Mercer
- Manager: Alex MacDonald
- Stadium: Tynecastle Stadium
- Scottish Premier Division: 3rd
- Scottish Cup: Quarter-final
- League Cup: Quarter-final
- Top goalscorer: League: John Robertson (17); All: John Robertson (22)
- Average home league attendance: 15,694

The 1989–90 season was Heart of Midlothian's seventh consecutive season in the Scottish Premier Division. Hearts also competed in the Scottish Cup and the Scottish League Cup.

== Overview ==
During the 1989–90 season, Hearts reached the quarter finals of both the Scottish Cup and the Scottish League Cup losing to Celtic and Dunfermline Athletic respectively. After a relatively successful season, finishing third in the Scottish Premier Division.

== Scottish Premier Division table ==
Pos	Team	Pld	W	D	L	GF	GA	GD	Pts	Qualification or relegation
1	Rangers (C)	36	20	11	5	48	19	+29	51	Qualification for the European Cup first round
2	Aberdeen	36	17	10	9	56	33	+23	44	Qualification for the Cup Winners' Cup first round
3	Heart of Midlothian	36	16	12	8	54	35	+19	44	Qualification for the UEFA Cup first round
4	Dundee United	36	11	13	12	36	39	−3	35	Qualification for the UEFA Cup first round
5	Celtic	36	10	14	12	37	37	0	34	

Source: RSSSF
Rules for classification: 1) points; 2) goal difference; 3) number of goals scored.
(C) Champions

== Statistics ==
=== Squad information ===
No.	Pos	Nat	Player	Total		Scottish Premier Division		Scottish Cup		Scottish League Cup	
No.	Pos	Nat	Player	Apps	Goals	Apps	Goals	Apps	Goals	Apps	Goals
	GK	(Scotland) SCO	Henry Smith	0	0	0	0	0	0	0	0
	FW	(Scotland) SCO	John Colquhoun	0	0	0	0	0	0	0	0
	DF	(Scotland) SCO	Craig Levein	0	0	0	0	0	0	0	0
	DF	(Scotland) SCO	Alan McLaren	0	0	0	0	0	0	0	0
	DF	(Scotland) SCO	Dave McPherson	0	0	0	0	0	0	0	0
	FW	(Scotland) SCO	Scott Crabbe	0	0	0	0	0	0	0	0
	MF	(Scotland) SCO	Eamonn Bannon	5	0	0	0	5	0	0	0
	MF	(Scotland) SCO	Gary Mackay	0	0	0	0	0	0	0	0
	FW	(Scotland) SCO	John Robertson	0	0	0	0	0	0	0	0
	DF	(Scotland) SCO	Tosh McKinlay	0	0	0	0	0	0	0	0
	DF	(Scotland) SCO	Alan McLaren	0	0	0	0	0	0	0	0
	MF	(Northern Ireland) NIR	David McCreery	0	0	0	0	0	0	0	0
	MF	(Scotland) SCO	Davie Kirkwood	0	0	0	0	0	0	0	0
	DF	(Scotland) SCO	Walter Kidd	0	0	0	0	0	0	0	0
	FW	(England) ENG	Wayne Foster	0	0	0	0	0	0	0	0
	MF	(Scotland) SCO	Neil Berry	0	0	0	0	0	0	0	0
	DF	(Scotland) SCO	Jimmy Sandison	0	0	0	0	0	0	0	0
	FW	(Scotland) SCO	Ian Ferguson	0	0	0	0	0	0	0	0
	DF	(Scotland) SCO	Brian Whittaker	0	0	0	0	0	0	0	0
	FW	(Socialist Federal Republic of Yugoslavia) YUG	Husref Musemic	0	0	0	0	0	0	0	0
	MF	(Scotland) SCO	George Wright	0	0	0	0	0	0	0	0

== See also ==
- List of Heart of Midlothian F.C. seasons
