= 1995 Scottish Cup final =

1995 Scottish Cup Final
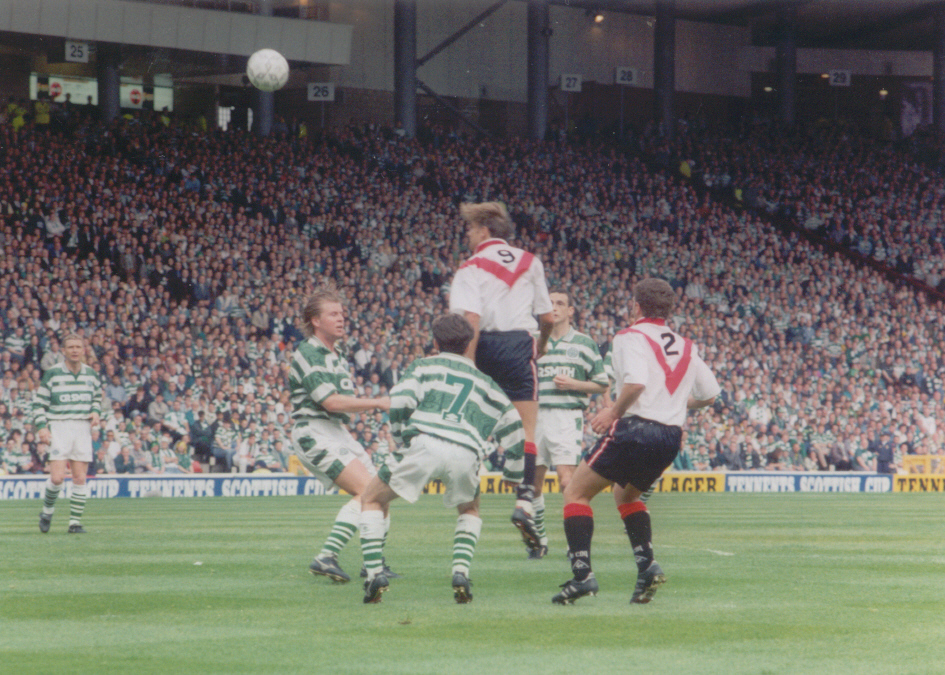
- Steve Cooper heads at goal
- Event: 1994–95 Scottish Cup
Celtic	Airdrieonians
1	0
- Date: 27 May 1995
- Venue: Hampden Park, Glasgow
- Man of the Match: Peter Grant
- Referee: Leslie Mottram
- Attendance: 36,915

The 1995 Scottish Cup Final was played between Celtic and Airdrieonians at Hampden Park on 27 May 1995.

Celtic won the match 1–0, with a goal by Pierre van Hooijdonk who headed in after a cross from the left by Tosh McKinlay.

This would prove to be the last occasion that the original Airdrieonians reached the final, with the club folding in 2002.

Celtic's victory secured the club's first major trophy in six years - the last honour having been won in the 1989 Scottish Cup Final against Rangers - bringing to an end one of the most unsuccessful periods in their history.

== Match ==
=== Details ===
27 May 1995
15:00 BST

Celtic	1–0	Airdrieonians
Van Hooijdonk 9'	Report

Hampden Park, Glasgow
Attendance: 36,915
Referee: Leslie Mottram

GK	1	(Republic of Ireland) Pat Bonner
DF	4	(Albania) Rudi Vata
DF	3	(Scotland) Tosh McKinlay
DF	5	(Scotland) Mark McNally
DF	2	(Scotland) Tom Boyd
MF	6	(Scotland) Peter Grant
MF	8	(Scotland) Paul McStay (c)
MF	7	(Scotland) Brian McLaughlin
MF	11	(Scotland) John Collins
FW	9	(Netherlands) Pierre van Hooijdonk	(substituted off) 39'
FW	10	(Scotland) Simon Donnelly	(substituted off) 70'
Substitutes:
GK	13	(Scotland) Gordon Marshall
MF	12	(Scotland) Phil O'Donnell	(substituted on) 70'
FW	14	(Scotland) Willie Falconer	(substituted on) 39'
Manager:
(Scotland) Tommy Burns

GK	1	(Scotland) John Martin
DF	2	(Scotland) Sandy Stewart
DF	4	(Scotland) Jimmy Sandison (c)
DF	5	(Scotland) Graham Hay	(substituted off) 81'
DF	3	(Scotland) Paul Jack
DF	7	(Scotland) Jimmy Boyle
MF	6	(Scotland) Kenny Black
MF	10	(Scotland) Paul Harvey	(substituted off) 51'
FW	9	(England) Steve Cooper
MF	8	(Scotland) Andy Smith
FW	11	(Scotland) Alan Lawrence
Substitutes:
GK	13	(Scotland) Willie McCulloch
FW	14	(Scotland) Jim McIntyre	(substituted on) 81'
MF	12	(Scotland) Tony Smith	(substituted on) 51'
Manager:
(Scotland) Alex MacDonald
