= Sandy Stewart (footballer) =

Scottish footballer (born 1965)

Personal information
- Full name: Alexander Stewart
- Date of birth: 14 October 1965 (age 61)
- Place of birth: Bellshill, Scotland
- Height: 1.70 m (5 ft 7 in)
- Position: Left-back

Youth career
- Eastwood Juveniles
- 1986–1987: Pollok

Senior career*
Years	Team	Apps	(Gls)
1987–1988	Heart of Midlothian	0	(0)
1988–1989	Kilmarnock	7	(1)
1989–2000	Airdrieonians	335	(12)
2000–2001	Partick Thistle	22	(0)
2001–2002	Airdrieonians	27	(0)
2002–2005	Airdrie United	40	(0)
Total		431	(13)

Managerial career
- 2002–2006: Airdrie United
- 2007: St Johnstone
- 2019–2020: Ayr United (caretaker)
- * Club domestic league appearances and goals

Alexander Stewart (born 14 October 1965) is a Scottish football coach and former player. He played as a left-back for Hearts, Kilmarnock, Airdrieonians, Partick Thistle and Airdrie United. He became the latter club's first manager, and has been an assistant manager at several clubs in Scotland, England, the United States and India, working with Owen Coyle.

== Playing career ==
=== Early years ===
Stewart was born in Bellshill. He grew up supporting Rangers and trained as a welder on leaving school. He began his career with Eastwood Juveniles before joining Pollok of the Junior grade in 1986, aged 20. Over a year later, he joined Heart of Midlothian. However, in his spell at Tynecastle he only made one appearance, in the East of Scotland Shield in May 1988. He then moved on to Kilmarnock where he played in seven matches towards the end of the 1988–89 season and scored his first senior goal, although at its conclusion the club were relegated to the third division on goal difference.

=== Airdrieonians ===
Stewart moved to second-tier Airdrieonians at the start of the next campaign and began to play regularly. He became an important member of the team in a very eventful period for the Diamonds, including promotion to the Premier Division in 1991, a 2–1 loss to champions Rangers in the 1992 Scottish Cup Final (in which he was captain with the regular Jimmy Sandison suspended), the club's only European ties against Sparta Prague, relegation in 1993, departure from their stadium in 1994 and relocation to Cumbernauld, victory in the 1994 Scottish Challenge Cup Final, another narrow defeat in the 1995 Scottish Cup Final this time to Celtic, losing four League Cup semi-finals plus a promotion playoff in 1997, and moving to a new home in 1998 - with a win over Celtic in one of the first games there.

=== Partick and return to Airdrieonians ===
In February 2000, Airdrieonians were placed into provisional liquidation due to debts related to paying for their new stadium and support lost due to years playing away from their hometown during its construction. After eleven years at the club, 34-year-old Stewart was made redundant at the end of that season (along with 27 of the 30-man squad). He moved to third-level Partick Thistle, and in his single season in Glasgow helped the club achieve promotion as champions.

He was released by the Jags in summer 2001 and rejoined Airdrie, where the club were still in a dire financial situation but nevertheless had managed to maintain their second-tier status and win another Scottish Challenge Cup. After Stewart returned the results improved further, finishing runners-up in the league and winning the 2001 Scottish Challenge Cup Final to retain the trophy. However, in May 2002 the club was dissolved.

== Managerial career ==
=== Player-manager: Airdrie United ===
Following the demise of Airdrieonians, in summer 2002 a consortium led by Jim Ballantyne purchased the assets of third-tier Clydebank and took their place in the league under the new name Airdrie United. Sandy Stewart (who had already been working towards coaching qualifications for several years) had already been invited to take over as player-manager of any new club in the town. He appointed former Airdrieonians teammate Kenny Black as his assistant, and continued to register as a player each year. In his first season in charge, he successfully consolidated the club's position in the division, and the following year they were promoted as champions, while also reaching the 2003 Scottish Challenge Cup Final - Stewart played the entire match. He also brought in another old playing colleague, veteran striker Owen Coyle, as a player-coach, and when Black moved on Leicester City, Stewart appointed Coyle as his assistant.

In 2004–05 Airdrie United finished 5th, and at the end of that campaign Stewart retired from playing, while Coyle left to manage St. Johnstone. The following year was also a fairly comfortable 6th-place. He was sacked on 13 November 2006, after the team took only 7 points from a possible 39 in the league; he was replaced by his former assistant, Kenny Black. Ultimately Airdrie United were relegated to the third tier, a fate which had never befallen the previous incarnation of the club.

=== St. Johnstone ===
On 9 February 2007, Stewart became assistant manager to his own former assistant Owen Coyle at St. Johnstone, replacing Montrose-bound Jim Weir. On 22 November 2007, Stewart became caretaker manager of St. Johnstone when Coyle left to become the new manager of English club Burnley. Three days later, in Stewart's first – and only – game in charge, St. Johnstone won the 2007 Scottish Challenge Cup Final, their first cup win since the Scottish Consolation Cup of 1911, with a 3–2 victory over Dunfermline Athletic.

=== Lancashire, Texas and back ===
Stewart opted to follow Coyle to Lancashire on 27 November 2007, working at Burnley for just over two years - they achieved promotion to the Premier League in 2008–09 via the play-offs. In January 2010 Coyle was appointed as manager of top-tier club Bolton Wanderers and Stewart moved with him. After finishing 14th in their first two seasons, Bolton were relegated in 2011–12 by a one-point margin, and following a poor start to the next season, the backroom team were relieved of duties on 9 October 2012.

In July 2013, Stewart was appointed assistant to Coyle at Wigan Athletic who had just been relegated to the Championship. On 5 December the same year he left the club, a few days after Coyle had departed.

On 31 December 2014, Stewart became assistant to Coyle at Houston Dynamo in Major League Soccer; however they were unable to steer the team to the Playoffs in the 2015 season, and in May 2016, midway through the following campaign, their 17-month stint came to an end. Stewart later described his time in the US as "a fantastic experience", but he had been unable to arrange for his family to move out with him, and admitted the travelling and time differences were challenging.

On 4 July 2016, Stewart was appointed assistant manager of Blackburn Rovers to be reunited once more with Coyle; they parted company with Blackburn on 21 February 2017. Stewart then assisted Coyle at Ross County during the 2017–18 season.

Stewart then worked with Ian McCall at Ayr United, and took temporary charge of the team after McCall left to manager Partick Thistle.

== Personal life ==
Stewart's son Scott (born 1996) is also a footballer who played over 150 games for Airdrieonians from 2013 before joining Arbroath in 2019. He initially began his career as a midfielder but retrained as a full-back, which he stated drew more scrutiny on his performances from his father due to his experience in the role.

== Managerial statistics ==
As of 19 October 2019

Managerial record by team and tenure
Team	From	To	Record				
Team	From	To	P	W	D	L	Win %
Airdrie United	1 July 2002	13 November 2006	186	73	48	65	39.2
St Johnstone	22 November 2007	27 November 2007	1	1	0	0	100.0
Ayr United	23 September 2019	22 October 2019	3	1	0	2	33.3
Total			190	75	48	67	39.5

== Honours ==
=== Player ===
Airdrieonians

- Scottish Challenge Cup: 1994–95, 2001–02
  - Scottish Cup: Runner-up 1991–92, 1994–95

Partick Thistle

- Scottish Second Division: 2000–01

=== Manager ===
Airdrie United

- Lanarkshire Cup: 2002–03, 2004–05
- Scottish Second Division: 2003–04

St Johnstone

- Scottish Challenge Cup: 2007–08

=== Individual ===
- 2002 - Inducted into Airdrieonians Hall of Fame.
- 2016 - Voted by supporters as Airdrie's best left-back as part of the club's 'Greatest XI'.
