= 1994–95 Scottish Challenge Cup =

1994–95 B&Q Cup
Tournament details
- Country: Scotland
- Teams: 30

Final positions
- Champions: Airdrieonians
- Runners-up: Dundee

Tournament statistics
- Matches played: 29
- Goals scored: 100 (3.45 per match)

The 1994–95 Scottish Challenge Cup was the fifth season of the competition, which was also known as the B&Q Cup for sponsorship reasons. It was competed for by the 30 member clubs of the Scottish Football League. The previous champions were Falkirk, who defeated St Mirren 3–0 in the 1993 final, and were unable to defend their title due to being promoted to the Scottish Premier League.

The final was played on 6 November 1994, between Dundee and Airdrieonians at McDiarmid Park in Perth. Airdrieonians won 3–2 after extra time, to win the tournament for the first time.

== Schedule ==
Round	First match date	Fixtures	Clubs
First round	Fri/Sat/Sun 16/17/18 September 1994	14	30 → 16
Second round	Tue/Wed 27/28 September 1994	8	16 → 8
Quarter-finals	Tue/Wed 4/5 October 1994	4	8 → 4
Semi-finals	Tuesday 18 October 1994	2	4 → 2
Final	Sunday 6 November 1994	1	2 → 1

== First round ==
Caledonian Thistle and Greenock Morton received random byes into the second round.

16 September 1994	Queen's Park	0–5	Clydebank	Hampden Park, Glasgow

17 September 1994	Airdrieonians	3–1	Berwick Rangers	Broadwood Stadium, Cumbernauld

17 September 1994	Brechin City	0–2	Dunfermline Athletic	Glebe Park, Brechin

17 September 1994	Cowdenbeath	2–1	Clyde	Central Park, Cowdenbeath

17 September 1994	Dumbarton	2–4	St Johnstone	Boghead Park, Dumbarton

17 September 1994	Dundee	5–0	Arbroath	Dens Park, Dundee

17 September 1994	East Fife	2–1	Ross County	Bayview Park, Methil

17 September 1994	Forfar Athletic	0–1	Alloa Athletic	Station Park, Forfar

17 September 1994	Hamilton Academical	2–0	Stenhousemuir	Firhill Stadium, Glasgow

17 September 1994	Meadowbank Thistle	1 – 2 (a.e.t.)	Montrose	Meadowbank Stadium, Edinburgh

17 September 1994	Queen of the South	0–2	Raith Rovers	Palmerston Park, Dumfries

17 September 1994	Stirling Albion	4–0	Albion Rovers	Forthbank Stadium, Stirling

17 September 1994	Stranraer	1* – 1 (a.e.t.)	St Mirren	Stair Park, Stranraer
	Stranraer won on penalties

18 September 1994	East Stirlingshire	1 – 1* (a.e.t.)	Ayr United	Firs Park, Falkirk
			Ayr United won on penalties

Source: SFL

== Second round ==
27 September 1994	Airdrieonians	1* – 1 (a.e.t.)	Raith Rovers	Broadwood Stadium, Cumbernauld
	Airdrieonians won on penalties

27 September 1994	Alloa Athletic	1–3	Clydebank	Recreation Park, Alloa

27 September 1994	Ayr United	4–2	Stranraer	Somerset Park, Ayr

27 September 1994	Dunfermline Athletic	4–2	Hamilton Academical	East End Park, Dunfermline

27 September 1994	East Fife	0–3	Cowdenbeath	Bayview Park, Methil

27 September 1994	Montrose	3–0	Stirling Albion	Links Park, Montrose

27 September 1994	Greenock Morton	4 – 3 (a.e.t.)	St Johnstone	Cappielow, Greenock

28 September 1994	Caledonian Thistle	1 – 1* (a.e.t.)	Dundee	Telford Street Park, Inverness
			Dundee won on penalties

Source: SFL

== Quarter-finals ==
4 October 1994

Airdrieonians	2–0	Ayr United

Broadwood Stadium, Cumbernauld

4 October 1994

Cowdenbeath	1–3	Dunfermline Athletic

Central Park, Cowdenbeath

4 October 1994

Dundee	2–1	Greenock Morton

Dens Park, Dundee

5 October 1994

Montrose	1 – 2 (a.e.t.)	Clydebank

Links Park, Montrose

== Semi-finals ==
18 October 1994

Airdrieonians	3–1	Clydebank

Broadwood Stadium, Cumbernauld

18 October 1994

Dunfermline Athletic	1–2	Dundee

East End Park, Dunfermline

== Final ==
6 November 1994
15:00

Dundee	2 – 3 (a.e.t.)	Airdrieonians
Britton; Hay (o.g.)	Report	Boyle; Harvey; Smith

McDiarmid Park, Perth
Attendance: 8,844
Referee: H. Williamson
