= 1994 Scottish Challenge Cup final =

- Event: 1994–95 Scottish Challenge Cup
Dundee	Airdrieonians
2	3
- After extra time
- Date: 6 November 1994
- Venue: McDiarmid Park, Perth
- Referee: H. Williamson (Renfrew)
- Attendance: 8,884

The 1994 Scottish Challenge Cup final, also known as the B&Q Cup final for sponsorship reasons, was an association football match between Dundee and Airdrieonians on 6 November 1994 at McDiarmid Park in Perth. It was the fifth final of the Scottish Challenge Cup since it was first organised in 1990 to celebrate the centenary of the Scottish Football League.

The match was Dundee's first national cup final since winning the inaugural tournament in 1990 whilst it was Airdrieonians's first in only two years since contesting the 1992 Scottish Cup final. The tournament was contested by clubs below the Scottish Premier Division, with both finalists from the First Division.

== Route to the final ==
Round	Opposition	Score
First round	Arbroath (a)	5–0
Second round	Inverness Caledonian Thistle (a)	1–1 (a.e.t.) Dundee won on penalties
Quarter-final	Morton (h)	2–1
Semi-final	Dunfermline Athletic (a)	2–1

=== Dundee ===
Dundee faced a trip to Arbroath in the first round which saw the team triumph 5–0 winners. The second round was another game on the road against Inverness Caledonian Thistle. With the game tied 1–1 after extra time, the game went to penalties with Dundee emerging victorious. to progress to the quarter-finals. A first home game of the tournament saw Morton travel to Dens Park, with the home team winning 2–1. The reward for reaching the semi-final was a third away game with the opponents in the form of Dunfermline Athletic at East End Park. Dundee won 2–1 to book a place in the final. This was Dundee's second appearance in the Scottish Challenge Cup final since winning the competition in its inaugural year in 1990.

=== Airdrieonians ===
Round	Opposition	Score
First round	Berwick Rangers (h)	3–1
Second round	Raith Rovers (h)	1–1 (a.e.t.) Airdrie won on penalties
Quarter-final	Ayr United (h)	2–0
Semi-final	Clydebank (h)	3–0

The first round draw paired Airdrieonians with Berwick Rangers at home with The Diamonds producing a 3–1 win. Raith Rovers were the opposition in the second round at Excelsior Stadium. With the scores tied at 1–1 after extra time, the game went to penalties and Airdrie emerged winners. The reward for reaching the quarter-final stage was another home game with the opposition being Ayr United and again Airdrieonians winning 2–0. The semi-final draw again resulted in Airdrieonians playing another home game, with Clydebank the opposition provided, Airdrieonians won by 3 goals to 0, to keep their second clean sheet of the tournament and progress to the Scottish Challenge Cup final for the first time since its inauguration in 1990.

== Pre-match ==
=== Analysis ===
Airdrieonians played all four of their games preceding the final at home, in the process scoring nine goals and conceding two. On the other hand, Dundee played only one game at home with the other three played on the road, whilst scoring a total of ten goals and conceding three. Airdrieonians kept two clean sheets over Dundee's one. This was the first appearance in the Scottish Challenge Cup Final for Airdrieonians but the second appearance for Dundee since winning the competition in its inaugural year in 1990.

== Match ==
6 November 1994

Dundee	2–3	Airdrieonians
Britton; Hay (o.g.)	Report	Boyle; Harvey; A. Smith

McDiarmid Park, Perth
Attendance: 8,884
Referee: H. Williamson (Renfrew)

=== Teams ===
Dundee:
GK	(France) Michel Pageaud
DF	(Scotland) John McQuillan
DF	(Scotland) Kevin Bain
MF	(Scotland) Ray Farningham
DF	(Scotland) Jim Duffy
MF	(Denmark) Morten Wieghorst
FW	(Scotland) George Shaw
DF	(Czech Republic) Dusan Vrto
FW	(Scotland) Paul Tosh	Substituted off
FW	(Scotland) Gerry Britton
MF	(Scotland) Neil McCann
Substitutes:
FW	(Scotland) Jim Hamilton	Substituted on
?	?
?	?
Manager:
(Scotland) Jim Duffy

Airdrieonians:
GK	(Scotland) John Martin
DF	(Scotland) Sandy Stewart		Substituted off
DF	(Scotland) Paul Jack
DF	(Scotland) Jimmy Sandison
DF	(Scotland) Graham Hay
MF	(Scotland) Kenny Black
MF	(Scotland) Jimmy Boyle
MF	(Scotland) John Davies
FW	(England) Steve Cooper
MF	(Scotland) Paul Harvey
MF	(Scotland) Alan Lawrence	Substituted off
Substitutes:
DF	(Scotland) Tony Smith		Substituted on
FW	(Scotland) Andy Smith	Substituted on
?	?
Manager:
(Scotland) Alex MacDonald

Match rules

- 90 minutes.
- 30 minutes of extra-time if necessary.
- Penalty shoot-out if scores still level.
