= John Martin (goalkeeper) =

Scottish footballer

Personal information
- Full name: John Galloway King Martin
- Date of birth: 27 October 1958 (age 68)
- Place of birth: Edinburgh, Scotland
- Position: Goalkeeper

Senior career*
Years	Team	Apps	(Gls)
1980–1999	Airdrieonians	658	(1)
1997–1998	→ Albion Rovers (loan)	3	(0)
1998–2000	Preston Athletic		
2000–2002	Cowdenbeath	40	(0)
2002–????	Bathgate Thistle		
Total		701	(1)
- * Club domestic league appearances and goals

John Galloway King Martin (born 27 October 1958) is a Scottish former footballer who played as a goalkeeper for Airdrieonians for nineteen years and later spent one season with Cowdenbeath, achieving promotion in the 2000–01 season.

Martin played in both the 1992 and 1995 Scottish Cup Finals for Airdrieonians and was the Kilnockie goalkeeper in the 2002 film A Shot at Glory. Martin often swung on the crossbar during games at the behest of supporters.

Opposition fans would often taunt him with chants of "scab" due to his reported strike breaking exploits during the miner's strike of 1983–84.

== Honours ==
Airdrieonians

- Scottish Challenge Cup: 1994–95

== See also ==
- List of footballers in Scotland by number of league appearances (500+)
