= Des McKeown =

Scottish footballer and manager

Desmond McKeown (born 18 January 1970) is a Scottish retired footballer who played for Airdrieonians, Albion Rovers, Queen of the South in two spells, Partick Thistle and Stenhousemuir. He was also in the Celtic youth team but never played a first-team game for them.

When playing for Dumfries club, Queen of the South, McKeown was part of the side that made it to the 1997 Scottish Challenge Cup final playing alongside Jamie McAllister, Andy Aitken, Jim Thomson, and man of the match Tommy Bryce.

In 2001, he was the subject of a book published by Mainstream Publishing entitled "Don't Give Up the Day Job: A Year in the Life a Part-time Footballer" written by Bill Leckie, which gave an insight into the difficulties of juggling work commitments and family life, whilst playing as a part-time professional footballer for Queen of the South F.C. in the Scottish League. This was his second stint with the Palmerston Park club.

His playing career effectively came to an end after sustaining a broken leg in a pre-season game between Barrow AFC and Stenhousemuir in 2002. He managed Stenhousemuir from 2004 to 2006 (during the 2004-2005 season, he was co-manager alongside Tony Smith). McKeown, who nowadays owns a stationery supply company in the Glasgow area, works part-time as a pundit for BBC Scotland and also has a column in the Scottish edition of The Sun newspaper.

== Sources ==
- Des McKeown at Soccerbase
- Des McKeown at Post War English & Scottish Football League A–Z Player's Transfer Database
