= Keith Hogg =

Scottish footballer

Personal information
- Full name: Keith Rodger Hogg
- Date of birth: 27 January 1980 (age 46)
- Place of birth: Lanark, Scotland
- Positions: Defender; midfielder

Youth career
- Glasgow City BC

Senior career*
Years	Team	Apps	(Gls)
1997–2000	Ayr United	10	(0)
2000–2002	Hamilton Academical	9	(0)
2002–2005	Glenafton Athletic		
2005–2010	Linlithgow Rose		
2010–2011	Kilsyth Rangers		
2011	Arthurlie		
2011–2013	Bathgate Thistle		
2013–2017	Kilsyth Rangers		

Managerial career
- 2012: Bathgate Thistle (caretaker)
- 2014–2017: Kilsyth Rangers
- * Club domestic league appearances and goals as of 12:18, 21 February 2018 (UTC)

Keith Rodger Hogg (born 27 January 1980) is a Scottish former professional footballer who has played in the Scottish Football League First Division for Ayr United.

== Career ==
Hogg began his professional career with Ayr United, and made his debut for the club aged 17 in January 1998. In the summer of 2000 he moved on to Hamilton Academical and went on to make a total of 23 appearances in senior football.

After leaving Accies, Hogg dropped to Junior level with Glenafton Athletic before joining Linlithgow Rose in July 2005. With Rose, Hogg won the Scottish Junior Cup in 2007 but he missed the club's 2010 victory through injury. Hogg also represented the Scotland Junior international team while a player at both Glenafton and Linlithgow.

In November 2010, Hogg joined Kilsyth Rangers in a loan move which eventually became permanent. After a short spell at Arthurlie, Hogg joined Bathgate Thistle in December 2011 and had his first experience of management on an interim basis following the resignation of Graeme Love in March 2012. Hogg re-joined Kilsyth Rangers for a second spell in the summer of 2013, and was appointed as assistant manager to Eric Sinclair in November of that year. He became manager of Kilsyth in his own right during the 2014 close season.

Hogg resigned his position at Kilsyth at the start of the 2017–18 season. He re-entered the game as part of Steve Kerrigan's coaching staff at Bo'ness United in January 2018.
