= Joe Dignam =

Scottish footballer (1931–1999)

Personal information
- Full name: Joseph Colquhoun Dignam
- Date of birth: 10 January 1931
- Place of birth: Glasgow, Scotland
- Date of death: 7 July 1999 (aged 68)
- Place of death: Glasgow, Scotland
- Position: Inside forward

Youth career
- Bathgate Thistle

Senior career*
Years	Team	Apps	(Gls)
1955–1957	Alloa Athletic	57	(34)
1957–1958	Wrexham	8	(0)
1958	Stirling Albion	0	(0)
1958–1959	Hamilton Academical	12	(4)
1959–1961	Bangor		
1961–1962	Crusaders		
- * Club domestic league appearances and goals

Joseph Colquhoun Dignam (10 January 1931 – 7 July 1999) was a Scottish professional footballer, who played as an inside forward. He mostly played in the Scottish leagues, although made appearances in the English Football League for Wrexham and in the Northern Irish league for Bangor, and Crusaders.
