= 1992 Scottish Cup final =

- Event: 1991–92 Scottish Cup
Rangers	Airdrieonians
2	1
- Date: 9 May 1992
- Venue: Hampden Park, Glasgow
- Referee: Douglas Hope
- Attendance: 44,045

The 1992 Scottish Cup final was played between Rangers and Airdrieonians, at Hampden Park, Glasgow, on 9 May 1992.

Rangers won the match 2–1. They opened the scoring with a goal by Mark Hateley in the 30th minute, a finish from six yards after a low cross from the left. Ally McCoist made it 2–0 with a half-volley, before Andy Smith scored a consolation goal from outside the box.

Rangers' route to the final was unusual in that they faced Scottish Premier Division opposition in every round, beating 1990 winners Aberdeen, 1991 winners Motherwell, St Johnstone and 1989 winners Celtic before facing Airdrie. McCoist scored the only goal of the semi-final win over Celtic at Hampden, the first goal his club had scored in an Old Firm fixture in the competition since 1973.

== Match details ==
9 May 1992

Rangers	2–1	Airdrieonians
Hateley 30'; McCoist 45'		Smith 81'

Hampden Park, Glasgow
Attendance: 44,045
Referee: Douglas Hope

RANGERS:
GK	1	(Scotland) Andy Goram
DF	2	(England) Gary Stevens
DF	4	(Scotland) Richard Gough (c)
DF	6	(Scotland) John Brown
DF	3	(Scotland) David Robertson
MF	5	(England) Nigel Spackman
MF	8	(Scotland) Stuart McCall
MF	11	(Ukraine) Oleksiy Mykhaylychenko
MF	7	(Scotland) Ian Durrant	(substituted off) 87'
FW	9	(Scotland) Ally McCoist
FW	10	(England) Mark Hateley
Substitutes:
MF	14	(England) Dale Gordon	(substituted on) 87'
FW	12	(England) Paul Rideout
Manager:
(Scotland) Walter Smith

AIRDRIEONIANS:
GK	1	(Scotland) John Martin
DF	2	(Scotland) Walter Kidd
DF	3	(Scotland) Sandy Stewart (c)
DF	4	(England) Chris Honor
DF	5	(England) Gus Caesar
DF	6	(Scotland) Paul Jack
MF	7	(Scotland) Jimmy Boyle
MF	8	(Scotland) Evan Balfour
MF	11	(Scotland) Davie Kirkwood		(substituted off) 82'
FW	9	(Scotland) Alan Lawrence	(substituted off) 63'
FW	10	(Republic of Ireland) Owen Coyle
Substitutes:
FW	12	(Scotland) Andy Smith	(substituted on) 63'
MF	14	(England) Wes Reid		(substituted on) 82'
Manager:
(Scotland) Alex MacDonald
