= Darren Fitzgerald =

Northern Irish football player

Personal information
- Date of birth: 13 October 1978 (age 48)
- Place of birth: Belfast, Northern Ireland
- Position: Forward

Team information
- Current team: Tullycarnet FC

Senior career*
Years	Team	Apps	(Gls)
1994–2000	Rangers	1	(0)
2000–2003	Glentoran	65	(11)
2003–2005	Ards	49	(27)
2005–2008	Ballymena United	35	(7)
2008–	Ards *Tullycarnet FC		

International career
1998	Northern Ireland U21	4	(0)
- * Club domestic league appearances and goals as of 31 March 2008

Darren Fitzgerald (born 13 October 1978) is a Northern Irish football player who plays as a forward. He currently plays for Tullycarnet FC 3rds in the Down Area].

Fitzgerald played youth football for Rangers and made one appearance for the senior team.

Fitzgerald had a role as a Rangers football player in the 2000 film A Shot at Glory, which starred Ally McCoist, many of the Rangers youth and reserve players were used in the film when McCoist's team faces them in the Scottish Cup Final, other players include Derek McInnes and Claudio Reyna. Players for other teams include Owen Coyle and other low league players. Likes the odd wee pint with his mate Dougal.

== Honours ==
- Irish Cup Winner 2001
- Northern Ireland International: Under-21
