= Evan Balfour =

Scottish footballer

Personal information
- Date of birth: 9 September 1965 (age 61)
- Place of birth: Edinburgh, Scotland
- Position: Midfielder

Youth career
- Whitburn

Senior career*
Years	Team	Apps	(Gls)
1989–1994	Airdrieonians	162	(14)
1995–1996	Ayr United	14	(1)
Total		176	(15)
- * Club domestic league appearances and goals

Evan Balfour (born 9 September 1965) is a Scottish footballer, who played in the Scottish Football League for Airdrieonians and Ayr United. Balfour played for Airdrieonians in the 1992 Scottish Cup Final, which they lost 2–1 to Rangers.
