= Ian Spence (footballer) =

Scottish footballer and manager

Personal information
- Position: Inside forward

Youth career
- –1957: Armadale Thistle

Senior career*
Years	Team	Apps	(Gls)
1957–1959	Stirling Albion	79	(35)
1959–1960	Raith Rovers	37	(9)
1960–1962	Stirling Albion	41	(10)
1962	Stenhousemuir	6	(1)
1962–1963	Third Lanark	17	(4)
1963–1964	Berwick Rangers	17	(1)
Total		197	(60)

Managerial career
- 1963–1966: Berwick Rangers
- 1967–1968: Dumbarton
- * Club domestic league appearances and goals

Ian Spence is a Scottish former football player and manager.

Ian Spence was married to Jean Somerville (July, 1955) and they had two daughters Vivianne (July, 1959) and Jacqui (May, 1964)

== Football career ==
Spence's footballing career started at junior side Armadale Thistle. In January 1957 he joined Stirling Albion. An attacking player, Spence was top scorer in the 1957/58 season with 20 goals helping Stirling Albion to win the league and gain promotion to the first division. He spent a brief spell at Raith Rovers between October 1959 and January 1960 before returning to Stirling Albion where he captained the side. He was released by the club in 1961 and the then moved to Stenhousemuir. In 1963 he joined Berwick Rangers as player/manager and in 1964 he took them to the semi-final of the Scottish League Cup losing 3-1 to Rangers. After leaving Berwick Rangers in 1966 he managed Dumbarton.
