= Ross McFarlane (footballer) =

Scottish footballer

Personal information
- Date of birth: 6 December 1961 (age 64)
- Place of birth: Glasgow, Scotland
- Position: Right back

Youth career
- Years: Team
- Eastercraigs
	Clyde	376	(4)
1994–1995	Queen's Park	1	(0)
Total		502	(5)

Ross McFarlane (born 6 December 1961) is a Scottish former professional footballer who played as a right back.

== Career ==
Born in Glasgow, McFarlane began his career at Eastercraigs, before making 502 appearances in the Scottish Football League with both Queen's Park and Clyde.

== See also ==
- List of footballers in Scotland by number of league appearances (500+)
