= Alan Lawrence =

Scottish footballer

Personal information
- Date of birth: 19 August 1962 (age 64)
- Place of birth: Edinburgh, Scotland
- Positions: Striker; winger; wingback

Senior career*
Years	Team	Apps	(Gls)
1984–1987	Meadowbank Thistle	102	(23)
1987–1989	Dundee	36	(2)
1989–1995	Airdrieonians	204	(49)
1995–1996	Heart of Midlothian	26	(5)
1996–1997	Airdrieonians	12	(3)
1997–1998	Partick Thistle	17	(3)
1998–2000	Stenhousemuir	68	(7)
2000–2002	Cowdenbeath	45	(4)
2002	Airdrieonians	0	(0)
Total		510	(96)
- * Club domestic league appearances and goals

Alan Lawrence (born 19 August 1962) also known as "Nipper", is a Scottish former footballer, best known for his time spent with Airdrieonians and Heart of Midlothian in the early and mid-1990s. He also worked as a coach with Airdrie United in the Scottish First and Second Divisions.

== Early career ==
Lawrence made his senior debut with local club Meadowbank Thistle, playing over 100 games for the club before moving to Dundee late in the 1986–87 season. Further goalscoring exploits there saw him move to Airdrieonians two years later, where although being used chiefly as a forward, he would also be deployed as a winger. In total, Lawrence would go on to make over 200 appearances for the Diamonds, scoring over 50 goals, culminating in a second Scottish Cup final appearance in 1995, again ending in defeat. In 2016, he was voted by fans as one of Airdrie's all time great 11.

== Hearts ==
Further success at Airdrie saw Lawrence signed by Hearts in summer 1995. Only a year later however, after 34 appearances and 7 goals (plus a third losing Scottish Cup final appearance) he was on his way back to Airdrie, where he spent another year and a half. In December 1997, he was released to Partick Thistle, scoring three goals in seventeen league appearances. His short tenure at Firhill ended when he signed for Third Division side Stenhousemuir in the summer of 1998.

== Stenhousemuir ==
Lawrence burst onto the scene at Ochilview with a hatful of crucial goals, most notably a hat-trick in a 5–1 trouncing of Albion Rovers, as the club chased promotion. In mid-season however, with a surplus of strikers and shortages elsewhere in the squad, Lawrence was moved to right-back, though he chipped in with some vital strikes in the club's hunt for promotion. A last minute volley to win at Montrose late in the season set the tone for Stenhousemuir's promotion just a matter of weeks later, the first in the club's history.

His second season at Ochilview was tougher, as the inevitable battle to stave off relegation ensued. Stenhousemuir would survive that season, but Lawrence departed in August 2000 following an alleged difference of opinion with the club's board of directors.

== Late playing career and coaching ==
Over the next few years, Lawrence acted as player-coach at Cowdenbeath. He rejoined Airdrie in 2002, but made no appearances. He also spent two years with Arbroath, playing three games.

In 2006, Lawrence coached junior side Bathgate Thistle to the final of the OVD Scottish Junior Cup, where they were narrowly defeated by Auchinleck Talbot. Bathgate and Lawrence eventually got their hands on the trophy in 2008, beating Cumnock in the final.

== Personal life ==
Lawrence made an appearance in the Scottish football film A Shot at Glory in 2000, alongside The Godfather star Robert Duvall, as well as Michael Keaton and Ally McCoist.

After being at Airdrie United for several years as assistant coach, in June 2012 Lawrence left the club citing "work commitments". However it was later reported that he had resigned from being a postman and was under investigation by The Royal Mail for mail theft. In February 2014, having pleaded guilty to the offence, he was sentenced to 100 hours of unpaid work.

== Honours ==
Airdrieonians

- Scottish Challenge Cup: 1994–95

== See also ==
- List of footballers in Scotland by number of league appearances (500+)
