= List of footballers in Scotland by number of league appearances =

The following is a list of footballers who have made at least 500 domestic league appearances in Scottish league football. This includes the appearances and goals of players, in the Scottish Professional Football League, or its predecessor competitions.

== List of players ==
Player	Nationality	Games (Note: Number of League games only.)	Goals (Note: Number of League goals only.)	Position	Seasons (Note: Number of League seasons played in Scotland only.)	Clubs (Note: Number of different Scottish league clubs only; two spells with the same club should only be counted once.)	Notes
Graeme Armstrong	Scotland	910	77	DF	27	5	
Andy Millen	Scotland	753	30	MF	25	11	
Keith Knox	Scotland	715	51	MF	24	5	
Harry Cairney	Scotland	710	18	DF	24	3	
John Martin	Scotland	701	1	GK	23	3	
Mark McGeown	Scotland	677	1	GK	23	7	
Gordon Marshall	Scotland	667	0	GK	25	7	
Davie Cooper	Scotland	662	95	LW	20	3	
Tommy Bryce	Scotland	659	164	FW	22	7	
Kenny Thomson	Scotland	654	7	DF	23	4	
Jim Gallacher	Scotland	649	0	GK	23	2	
Sandy Jardine	Scotland	638	45	DF	23	2	
Keith Wright	Scotland	638	223	FW	20	6	
David Narey	Scotland	633	23	DF	22	2	
Paul Hegarty	Scotland	628	76	DF	20	4	
Bob Ferrier	England	626	255	MF	20	1 (Note: Motherwell)	
Jim Fallon	Scotland	619	20	DF	18	1 (Note: Clydebank)	
Maurice Malpas	Scotland	617	20	DF	19	1 (Note: Dundee United)	
Owen Coyle	Republic of Ireland	615	237	FW	19	10	
Colin McGlashan	Scotland	609	210	FW	20	9	
Derek Collins	Scotland	604	13	DF	19	4	
Alan Morton	Scotland	600	129	FW	20	2	
Arthur Duncan	Scotland	598	102	MF	22	3	
Alan Rough	Scotland	595	0	GK	21	5	
Dave McPherson	Scotland	586	50	DF	19	3	
Hamish McAlpine	Scotland	585	4	GK	21	5	
Alec McNair	Scotland	583	8	DF	21	1 (Note: Celtic)	
Willie Fotheringham	Scotland	580	10	GK	17	5	
David Wylie	Scotland	573	0	GK	18	4	
Willie Irvine	Scotland	571	201	FW	20	9	
Darren Dods	Scotland	565	36	DF	26	7	
Patsy Gallacher	Republic of Ireland	563	209	FW	20	2	
Gary Mackay	Scotland	560	46	MF	19	2	
Willie Miller	Scotland	560	21	DF	18	1 (Note: Aberdeen)	
Tom Boyd	Scotland	558	8	DF	18	2	
John Robertson	Scotland	558	225	FW	19	3	
Jim Leighton	Scotland	554	0	GK	22	3	
Stewart McKimmie	Scotland	554	9	DF	18	3	
Sandy Archibald	Scotland	553	131	FW	19	2	
Jimmy Boyle	Scotland	552	36	DF	18	7	
Henry Smith	Scotland	550	0	GK	19	4	
John Brogan	Scotland	549	221	FW	21	6	
Peter Kerr	Scotland	549	19	DF	22	3	
Brian McKeown	Scotland	548	16	DF	19	2	
Andy Rolland	Scotland	547	66	DF	19	3	
Roy Aitken	Scotland	547	43	DF	20	4	
Alan Main	Scotland	545	0	GK	23	8	
Ally Graham	Scotland	543	130	FW	22	13	
Billy Dodds	Scotland	541	192	FW	17	6	
Jim Black	Scotland	540	3	DF	20	3	
Gordon Wallace	Scotland	536	264	FW	17	4	
Jimmy Holmes	Scotland	535	7	DF	18	5	
Kenny Black	Scotland	535	39	MF	21	6	
Brian Irvine	Scotland	533	45	DF	20	4	
Jimmy Brownlie	Scotland	533	2	FW	18	3	
Ross Caven	Scotland	532	96	DF	20	1 (Note: Queen's Park)	
Darren Henderson	Scotland	530	85	MF	21	10	
Paul Lambert	Scotland	530	34	MF	21	4	
Jock Bradford	Scotland	529	0	GK	18	3	
John Rankin	Scotland	529	56	MF	17	7	
Ally McCoist	Scotland	528	282	FW	20	3	
Tom McAdam	Scotland	524	91	DF	21	6	
Paul Kane	Scotland	523	51	MF	17	5	
Brian Ahern	Scotland	523	72	MF	17	3	
Murray McDermott	Scotland	520	0	GK	19	6	
Paul McStay	Scotland	515	57	MF	16	1	
Bobby Clark	Scotland	513	0	GK	21	3	
Murdo MacLeod	Scotland	513	67	MF	18	4	
Jimmy McMenemy	Scotland	512	145	FW	22	2	
Dave Bowman	Scotland	510	19	MF	20	4	
Tommy Coyne	Republic of Ireland	510	204	FW	20	7	
Ken Eadie	Scotland	510	230	FW	20	6	
George Stevenson	Scotland	510	169	FW	16	1	
Alan Lawrence	Scotland	510	96	FW	18	7	
Norrie McCathie	Scotland	508	55	DF	16	3	
Eamonn Bannon	Scotland	505	100	MF	18	4	
Paul Smith	Scotland	505	102	FW	16	7	
Andrew Considine	Scotland	505	31	DF	20	2	
Willie Wallace	Scotland	505	247	FW	18	5	
Tommy Burns	Scotland	504	68	MF	20	2	
Jimmy McColl	Scotland	504	263	FW	19	4	
Bertie Miller	Scotland	503	110	MF	18	5	
Ian Maxwell	Scotland	503	33	DF	17	5	
Ross McFarlane	Scotland	502	5	DF	16	2	
Bobby Evans	Scotland	500	10	DF	22	4	

== See also ==
- List of footballers in England by number of league appearances
- List of footballers in Scotland by number of league goals
- List of footballers in England by number of league goals
