= Jimmy Sandison =

Scottish footballer

Personal information
- Full name: James William Sandison
- Date of birth: 22 June 1965 (age 61)
- Place of birth: Edinburgh, Scotland
- Position: Defender

Senior career*
Years	Team	Apps	(Gls)
1983–1991	Heart of Midlothian	72	(3)
1991–2001	Airdrieonians	302	(3)
2001–2004	Stenhousemuir	32	(1)
- * Club domestic league appearances and goals

Jimmy Sandison (born 22 June 1965) is a Scottish former footballer best known for his time spent at Heart of Midlothian and Airdrieonians.

== Career ==
Sandison was brought up in the Pennywell area of Edinburgh and attended school locally. He signed for Hearts at the age of 17. During his time with Hearts he was a reliable and versatile player. A highlight was his man-marking Herbert Prohaska, who was one of Europe's finest players at the time, out of the game in a European tie against Austria Vienna. The Jam Tarts won 1–0 in Austria.

He was purchased for £100,000 in 1991 by Airdrie manager Alex McDonald, who had been his manager at Hearts. Sandison was McDonald's first signing and was also made team captain. Soon after his move to Airdrie, Sandison was at the centre of a controversial refereeing decision in a 1991–92 Scottish League Cup semi final. The referee awarded a penalty kick to the opposition, Dunfermline Athletic, for handball by Sandison. The decision was greeted with amazement amongst many as Sandison had neither handled the ball nor been inside the box.

He led the side for the entire decade he was there, wearing the armband in every single competitive game he played bar one. He captained the side throughout their 1991–92 Scottish Cup run, but missed the final due to suspension. Sandison was however captain during their only appearance in European competition as the Diamonds took part in the 1992–93 European Cup Winners' Cup. "Skip" as he was known to his teammates also captained them in the 1995 Scottish Cup Final. He is held as a cult hero in Airdrie for being the leader and backbone of some of the club's best years. During this time Sandison had the reputation as being a technically gifted sweeper who was hard but fair and a player who was a leader with a never say die attitude.

After Airdrie were liquidated, Sandison went on, in the latter part of his career, to play for Stenhousemuir, under former chairman at Airdrie, George Peat. Sandison later went on to manage Bo'ness Junior team for three reasonably successful years between 2003 and 2006.

In the Irvine Welsh novel Marabou Stork Nightmares, the character Sandy Jamieson is based on Sandison. Furthermore, in Welsh's book Trainspotting, one of the main characters reads a newspaper in which Sandison is on the back page of.

He now still resides in Edinburgh with his wife Karen and son C.J. He works as a black cab driver in Edinburgh as well as doing media and ambassadorial work for his former club Hearts. He is also one of the hierarchy of the 1874 Fighting Fund, who helped stave off liquidation from Hearts and who are now the main fundraising group in support of the new regime after the club exited administration. More so he is captain of the Hearts legends team which includes players such as John Robertson, Gary Locke and Henry Smith. He was also inducted into the Airdrie Hall of fame in 2005.

== Honours ==
Airdrieonians

- Scottish Challenge Cup: 1994–95
