= Tony Smith (footballer, born 1973) =

Scottish footballer

Personal information
- Full name: Anthony Smith
- Date of birth: 28 October 1973 (age 53)
- Place of birth: Bellshill, Scotland
- Position: Left back

Youth career
- 1992–1993: Heart of Midlothian

Senior career*
Years	Team	Apps	(Gls)
1993–1999	Airdrieonians	38	(1)
1999–2001	Dundee United	10	(0)
2001–2002	Airdrieonians	31	(2)
2002–2003	Berwick	23	(0)
2003–2005	Stenhousemuir	44	(0)
- Bathgate Thistle
Total		146	(3)

Managerial career
- 2004–2005: Stenhousemuir (Co-manager)
- * Club domestic league appearances and goals

Tony Smith (born 28 October 1973 in Bellshill) is a Scottish footballer, who played as a left back.

== Honours ==
Airdrieonians

- Scottish Challenge Cup: 1994–95

== See also ==
- Dundee United F.C. season 1999-00
- Dundee United F.C. season 2000-01
