= Kevin McKee (footballer) =

Scottish footballer

Personal information
- Date of birth: 10 June 1966 (age 60)
- Place of birth: Edinburgh, Scotland
- Height: 1.73 m (5 ft 8 in)
- Position: Right back

Senior career*
Years	Team	Apps	(Gls)
1982–1986	Hibernian	38	(0)
1986–1993	Hamilton Academical	236	(7)
1993–1996	Partick Thistle	51	(0)
1996–1997	Stenhousemuir	13	(0)
Total		338	(7)

Managerial career
- 2020: Bathgate Thistle
- * Club domestic league appearances and goals

Kevin McKee (born 10 June 1966) is a Scottish former footballer that is 5 ft 8 in tall, and has played for Hibernian, Hamilton, Partick Thistle and Stenhousemuir in the Scottish Football League.
