= Brian McKeown =

Scottish footballer

Personal information
- Date of birth: 31 October 1956 (age 70)
- Place of birth: Motherwell, Scotland
- Position: Central defender

Senior career*
Years	Team	Apps	(Gls)
- Fauldhouse United
1978–1990	Airdrieonians	371	(13)
1990–1997	Queen of the South	177	(3)
- Shotts Bon Accord
Total		548	(16)
- * Club domestic league appearances and goals

Brian McKeown (born 31 October 1956) is a Scottish former footballer who played as a central defender for Fauldhouse United, Airdrieonians, Queen of the South and Shotts Bon Accord.

== See also ==
- List of footballers in Scotland by number of league appearances (500+)
