= Paul Smith (footballer, born 1962) =

Scottish footballer and manager

Personal information
- Date of birth: 2 November 1962 (age 63)
- Place of birth: Currie, Scotland
- Position: Midfielder

Team information
- Current team: Falkirk (Assistant Manager)

Youth career
- 1980–1982: Dundee
- 1982: Dundee United

Senior career*
Years	Team	Apps	(Gls)
1982–1986	Raith Rovers	127	(50)
1986–1988	Motherwell	78	(13)
1988–1991	Dunfermline Athletic	99	(11)
1991–1992	Falkirk	51	(3)
1992–1995	Dunfermline Athletic	105	(16)
1995–1996	Heart of Midlothian	9	(0)
1996–1997	Ayr United	33	(9)
1997–1998	Berwick Rangers	3	(0)
Total		505	(102)

Managerial career
- 1997–2004: Berwick Rangers
- 2012: Raith Rovers (caretaker)
- ?-2022: Raith Rovers (Assistant Manager)
- 2022-: Falkirk (Assistant Manager)
- * Club domestic league appearances and goals as of 09:33, 7 January 2009 (UTC)

Paul Smith (born 2 November 1962) is a Scottish former football player and manager who is the assistant manager at Falkirk.

Smith made his senior breakthrough with Raith Rovers in 1983. A combative midfielder, he enjoyed something of a journeyman career, encompassing spells with Motherwell, Dunfermline Athletic (twice), Falkirk, Heart of Midlothian, Ayr United and Berwick Rangers, where he was manager for seven years.

== Career ==
After briefly being attached to both Dundee and Dundee United, Smith first joined Raith Rovers as a player in the season 1982–83, and the following year he was joined by Keith Wright with whom he struck up a potent striking partnership, Smith scoring 34 goals and Wright 25 in 1984–85; the following season Smith notched up 27 goals to Wright's 28. 'Smudger' as he was affectionately known as a player, was sold to Motherwell in the summer of 1986 and also had spells with Dunfermline (making over 200 appearances over two spells), Falkirk, Hearts and Ayr United before moving to Berwick Rangers in 1997.

Two months after his arrival at Shielfield Park, Smith was appointed manager, a post he held until 2004, when he got the club promoted to the Scottish Second Division. He later performed the role of assistant manager to Des McKeown at Stenhousemuir, until the pair's dismissal in November 2006. He later worked for Raith Rovers as assistant manager to Grant Murray; he had been assistant to John McGlynn when the club was promoted to the First Division, reached a Scottish Cup semi-final and just missed out on promotion to the SPL. He was also caretaker manager at Raith following the departure of McGlynn to Hearts, following which he was appointed to continue the assistant manager role by Murray.

== See also ==
- List of footballers in Scotland by number of league appearances (500+)
