= Graeme Love =

Scottish footballer

Personal information
- Full name: Graeme James Love
- Date of birth: 7 December 1973 (age 52)
- Place of birth: Bathgate, Scotland
- Position: Defender

Youth career
- Salvesen BC

Senior career*
Years	Team	Apps	(Gls)
1991–1997	Hibernian	39	(0)
1997–1998	Ayr United	12	(0)
1998	Queen of the South	21	(0)
1998–1999	Clydebank	7	(1)
1999–2000	East Fife	16	(0)
2000–2001	Stirling Albion	18	(0)
2001–2012	Bathgate Thistle		
2012–?	Livingston United		
Total		113	(1)

International career
1994	Scotland U21	1	(0)

Managerial career
- 2009–2012: Bathgate Thistle
- * Club domestic league appearances and goals

Graeme James Love (born 7 December 1973), is a Scottish former professional footballer who played as a defender for several clubs in the Scottish Football League.

== Career ==
Love joined Hibernian from Salvesen Boys Club in May 1991 and was a member of their SFA Youth Cup winning side in 1992. He went on to make 39 appearances in the Premier Division for Hibs over the next six seasons then later played for Ayr United, Queen of the South, Clydebank, East Fife and Stirling Albion.

Love stepped down to Junior level in 2001, joining his local club Bathgate Thistle and played in their Scottish Junior Cup winning side of 2008. He was appointed manager of Bathgate in June 2009, but was sacked in March 2012.

After leaving Bathgate, Love joined Livingston United as a player in August 2012.
