= Bill Leckie =

Scottish sportswriter

- Occupations: Journalist, broadcaster

Bill Leckie is a Scottish sports journalist and broadcaster who currently writes for the Scottish edition of The Sun newspaper.

Leckie also does commentary on Scottish Football League matches for BBC Radio Scotland and makes regular contributions on Talksport and BBC Radio 5 Live.

In 2010, Bill Leckie was nominated for 'Journalist of the Year' at the Stonewall Awards for an article he wrote on the gay Welsh rugby star Gareth Thomas. The nomination was withdrawn following criticisms from trans campaigners who objected to articles Leckie has written mocking a bingo night for drag queens and arguing against taxpayer-funded gender reassignment surgery for prisoners.

He grew up in the Foxbar area of Paisley and was a childhood fan of Celtic, as explained in his book Penthouse and Pavement (1999), a critique on Scottish football and its inequities as he saw them.
