= Graham Hay =

Scottish footballer

Personal information
- Date of birth: 27 November 1965 (age 60)
- Place of birth: Falkirk, Scotland
- Position: Defender

Youth career
- 1984–1986: St Mirren

Senior career*
Years	Team	Apps	(Gls)
1986–1989	Stranraer	101	(0)
1989–1990	Falkirk	25	(1)
1990–1992	Stirling Albion	49	(0)
1992–1994	Clydebank	52	(1)
1994–1996	Airdrieonians	37	(2)
1996–1998	Stranraer	10	(0)
- Maryhill
Total		274	(4)
- * Club domestic league appearances and goals

Graham Hay (born 27 November 1965) is a Scottish footballer, who played for Stranraer, Falkirk, Stirling Albion, Clydebank and Airdrieonians. Hay played for Airdrieonians in the 1995 Scottish Cup Final, which they lost 1–0 to Celtic.

== Honours ==
Airdrieonians

- Scottish Challenge Cup: 1994–95
