= Ian Ferguson (footballer, born 1968) =

Scottish footballer

Personal information
- Date of birth: 5 August 1968 (age 58)
- Place of birth: Dunfermline, Scotland
- Position: Striker

Youth career
- 19??–1987: Lochgelly Albert

Senior career*
Years	Team	Apps	(Gls)
1987–1992	Raith Rovers	111	(23)
1992–1993	Heart of Midlothian	60	(9)
1993–1997	St Johnstone	42	(6)
1997–1999	Ayr United	55	(16)
1998–1999	Livingston	4	(0)
1999	Greenock Morton	7	(0)
1999–2000	Hamilton Academical	10	(4)
2000–2001	Forfar Athletic	27	(8)
2001–2002	Stenhousemuir	24	(6)
2002–2004	Berwick Rangers	9	(0)
Total		349	(72)
- * Club domestic league appearances and goals

Ian Ferguson (born 5 August 1968) is a Scottish former professional footballer. He played for ten clubs in a seventeen-year senior career.

== Career ==
Ferguson began his career at junior club Lochgelly Albert in the 1980s. In 1987, he signed professional terms with Raith Rovers, and went on to make 111 league appearances for the Stark's Park club, scoring 23 goals.

In 1992, he moved to Edinburgh to join Hearts in a £100,000 deal. In just under two years with the Jambos, he scored nine goals in 60 appearances, the most notable being the winner in an Edinburgh Derby in March 1992. Ferguson signed for St Johnstone for £110,000 in 1993, but his four years in Perth were blighted by injury and he managed only 42 league appearances.

Ayr United came in for Ferguson's services in 1997, and with his injuries behind him, managed to score sixteen goals in 55 games with the Honest Men, including a crucial strike in a Scottish Cup tie against local rivals Kilmarnock.

Ferguson left Ayr in 1999 after only two years, and went on to play for six other clubs in as many years, bringing his professional career to a close in 2004 with Berwick Rangers. After leaving Shielfield Park, He returned to his junior football roots with Bo'ness United. He later played with Rosebank AFC in Dunfermline.
