= A Shot at Glory =

2002 film by Michael Corrente

- Film poster for A Shot at Glory
- Directed by: Michael Corrente
- Written by: Denis O'Neill
- Produced by: Robert Duvall
- Starring: Robert Duvall; Ally McCoist; Brian Cox; Kirsty Mitchell; Cole Hauser; Michael Keaton; Martin Owens; Scott G. Anderson; Morag Hood; Libby Langdon; Catherine Figgins
- Music by: Mark Knopfler
- Distributed by: United International Pictures (United Kingdom); MAC Releasing (United States)
- Release date: 3 May 2002
- Running time: 114 min
- Countries: United States; United Kingdom
- Language: English

A Shot at Glory is a film by Michael Corrente produced in 1999 and released in 2002, starring Robert Duvall and the Scottish football player Ally McCoist. It had limited commercial and critical success. The film features the fictional Scottish football club Kilnockie FC, based on a Second Division Scottish Football League club, as they attempt to reach their first ever Scottish Cup Final. The final game is against Rangers.

== Plot ==
Robert Duvall plays the club manager, Gordon McLeod. Jackie McQuillan (Ally McCoist) is the team's striker, an ageing player on the verge of retirement, who has recently been signed from Arsenal. McQuillan is a legendary ex-Celtic player who, as well as being married to McLeod's daughter, has a reputation for being troublesome. The two men put their personal problems aside as they try to prevent the small fishing town of Kilnockie from losing its club, which is owned by an American businessman (played by Michael Keaton) who wants to move the club to Dublin in Ireland.

== Cast ==
- Robert Duvall as Gordon McLeod
- Ally McCoist as Jackie McQuillan
- Michael Keaton as Peter Cameron
- Brian Cox as Martin Smith, Rangers manager
- Kirsty Mitchell as Kate McQuillan
- Bill Murdoch as Desmond
- Ian Constable as Physio to team
- Daniel Healy as Street Kid 2
- Ian McKellar as himself (Hampden crowd)

Kilnockie Team

- Cole Hauser as Kelsey O'Brian
- Owen Coyle as himself
- Andy Smith as himself
- Steven Hamilton as himself
- Peter Hetherston as himself
- Craig McEwan as himself
- Kenny Black as himself
- Ian Constable as Physio

Queen of the South Team

- Ian McCall as Derek McCall

Rangers Team

- Darren Fitzgerald as himself
- Ally Maxwell as himself
- Derek Ferguson as himself
- Didier Agathe as himself
- Eddie May as himself

== Production ==
The film's working title was The Cup.

Filming took place at several locations across Scotland, including Boghead Park (the former ground of Dumbarton), Dumfries club Queen of the South's Palmerston Park ground, Kilmarnock's Rugby Park ground and Hampden Park. The majority of scenes representing the town of Kilnockie were filmed in Crail, Fife. Several extras in the film were then players of Raith Rovers, including future Celtic player Didier Agathe. Duvall regularly went to see Raith Rovers to learn from John McVeigh, the manager, on whom his character was based. The movie is loosely based on the cup exploits of Airdrieonians, who as a small town team reached two Scottish Cup Finals, several League Cup semi-finals, and qualified for the European Cup Winners Cup in the 1990s. John McVeigh was Assistant Manager at Airdrie when they enjoyed this success. The cast featured several past and current Airdrie players in both speaking and non speaking roles. The events of the film were also mirrored later in 2006 when Third Division Gretna reached the Scottish Cup final, losing on penalties to SPL runners-up Hearts. Robert Duvall was impressed with Ally McCoist's acting.

Former Celtic player Jimmy Johnstone and Rangers' Jim Baxter were among the star names who turned down roles in the film.

In the United States, the film was the first to be distributed by MAC Releasing, a film company founded by Mike Marcus, Andy Gruenberg, and Craig Baumgarten.

== Reception ==
The film received mixed reviews.

The movie was the subject of a feature length podcast review by Quickly Kevin, Will He Score?

== See also ==
- A Shot at Glory (soundtrack)
- List of association football films
