= 1991–92 Scottish Cup =

Tournament details
- Country: Scotland

Final positions
- Champions: Rangers
- Runners-up: Airdrieonians

The 1991–92 Scottish Cup was the 107th staging of Scotland's most prestigious football knockout competition. The Cup was won by Rangers who defeated Airdrieonians in the final.

== First round ==
Home team	Score	Away team
Gala Fairydean	2 – 2	Ross County
Albion Rovers	0 – 2	Arbroath
Alloa Athletic	7 – 1	Hawick Royal Albert
East Fife	6 – 0	Queen's Park
East Stirlingshire	0 – 2	Dumbarton
Vale of Leithen	1 – 2	Stranraer

=== Replay ===
Home team	Score	Away team
Ross County	3 – 0	Gala Fairydean

== Second round ==
Home team	Score	Away team
Clyde	2 – 0	Arbroath
Alloa Athletic	0 – 2	Dumbarton
Berwick Rangers	7 – 4	Ross County
Brechin City	0 – 0	East Fife
Huntly	4 – 2	Civil Service Strollers
Peterhead	1 – 1	Cowdenbeath
Stenhousemuir	1 – 4	Inverness Caledonian
Stranraer	4 – 1	Queen of the South

=== Replays ===
Home team	Score	Away team
East Fife	3 – 1	Brechin City
Cowdenbeath	6 – 1	Peterhead

== Third round ==
Home team	Score	Away team
Dundee	1 – 1	Stirling Albion
Dundee United	6 – 0	Berwick Rangers
Airdrieonians	2 – 1	Stranraer
Ayr United	1 – 1	Motherwell
Celtic	6 – 0	Montrose
Clydebank	3 – 1	Cowdenbeath
Dumbarton	0 – 2	Huntly
Forfar Athletic	0 – 0	Dunfermline Athletic
Hamilton Academical	0 – 1	Falkirk
Hibernian	2 – 0	Partick Thistle
Inverness Caledonian	3 – 1	Clyde
Meadowbank Thistle	1 – 1	Kilmarnock
Greenock Morton	4 – 2	East Fife
Raith Rovers	0 – 2	St Johnstone
St Mirren	0 – 0	Hearts
Aberdeen	0 – 1	Rangers

=== Replays ===
Home team	Score	Away team
Dunfermline Athletic	3 – 1	Forfar Athletic
Hearts	3 – 0	St Mirren
Stirling Albion	0 – 1	Dundee
Kilmarnock	1 – 1 (3 – 4 pen.)	Meadowbank Thistle
Motherwell	4 – 1	Ayr United

== Fourth round ==
Home team	Score	Away team
Clydebank	1 – 5	Hibernian
Dunfermline Athletic	1 – 2	Hearts
Falkirk	0 – 0	Dundee
Huntly	1 – 3	Airdrieonians
Inverness Caledonian	2 – 2	St Johnstone
Greenock Morton	2 – 2	Meadowbank Thistle
Rangers	2 – 1	Motherwell
Celtic	2 – 1	Dundee United

=== Replays ===
Home team	Score	Away team
Meadowbank Thistle	2 – 3	Greenock Morton
St Johnstone	3 – 0	Inverness Caledonian
Dundee	0 – 1	Falkirk

== Quarter-finals ==
Home team	Score	Away team
Hearts	3 – 1	Falkirk
Celtic	3 – 0	Greenock Morton
Hibernian	0 – 2	Airdrieonians
St Johnstone	0 – 3	Rangers

== Semi-finals ==
31 March 1992

Rangers	1–0	Celtic
McCoist

Hampden Park, Glasgow
Attendance: 45,191

4 April 1992

Airdrieonians	0–0	Hearts

Hampden Park, Glasgow
Attendance: 27,310

=== Replay ===
14 April 1992

Airdrieonians	1–1	Hearts
Kenny Black		Alan McLaren
Penalties
	4–2

Hampden Park, Glasgow
Attendance: 11,163

== Final ==
9 May 1992

Rangers	2–1	Airdrieonians
Hateley 30'; McCoist 45'		Smith 81'

Hampden Park, Glasgow
Attendance: 44,045
Referee: Douglas Hope

== Largest Wins ==
A list of the largest wins from the competition.

Score	Home team	Away team	Stage
7-1	Alloa Athletic	Hawick Royal Albert	First Round
6-0	East Fife	Queens Park	First Round
6-0	Celtic	Montrose	Third Round
6-0	Dundee United	Berwick Rangers	Third Round
6-1	Cowdenbeath	Peterhead	Second Round (Replay)

== See also ==
- 1991–92 in Scottish football
- 1991–92 Scottish League Cup
