= Andy Smith (footballer, born 1968) =

Scottish footballer

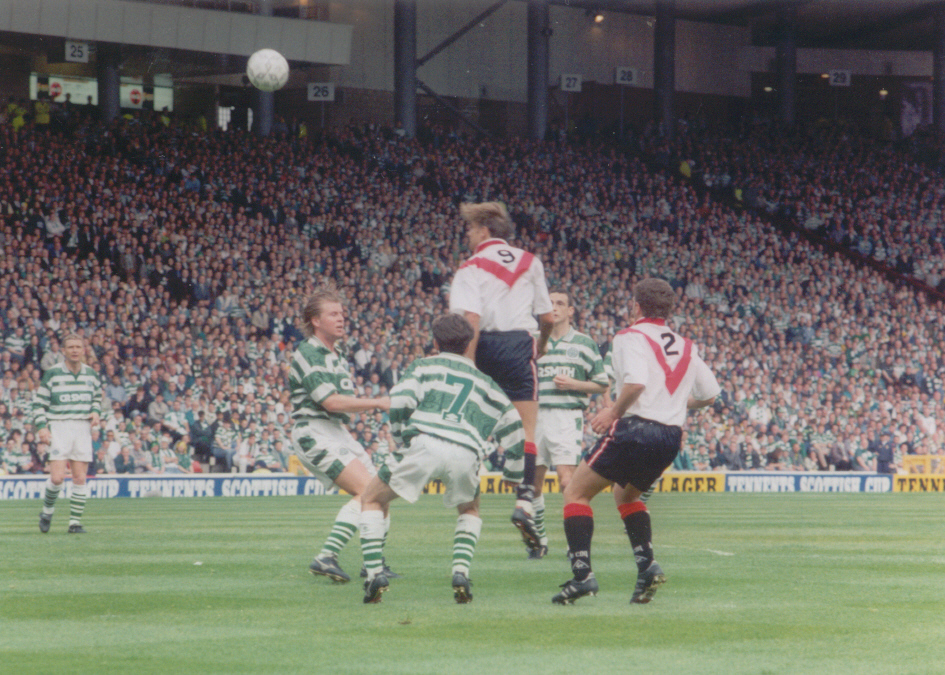
- Steve Cooper wins a header during the 1995 Scottish Cup Final

Personal information
- Full name: Andrew Mark Smith
- Date of birth: 27 November 1968 (age 57)
- Place of birth: Aberdeen, Scotland
- Height: 6 ft 1 in (1.85 m)
- Position: Striker

Senior career*
Years	Team	Apps	(Gls)
- Huntly
1987–1989	Peterhead		
1989	Calgary Kickers	24	(11)
1990–1995	Airdrieonians	165	(30)
1995–2000	Dunfermline Athletic	120	(47)
1999–2000	→ Kilmarnock (loan)	5	(1)
2000–2001	Kilmarnock	10	(1)
2000	→ Ross County (loan)	3	(0)
2001–2003	Raith Rovers	65	(19)
2003–2004	Clyde	32	(10)
2004–2005	Gretna	12	(3)
Total		436	(122)

International career
1998	Scotland B	1	(0)

Managerial career
- 2008: Gretna
- * Club domestic league appearances and goals

Andrew Mark Smith (born 27 November 1968) is a Scottish retired footballer who played as a striker, and most recently was a temporary manager of Gretna with Mick Wadsworth.

== Career ==
Born in Aberdeen and a product of the Scottish Highland Football League, Smith's first senior club was Huntly. He subsequently transferred to Peterhead within the Highland League, prior to moving to Airdrieonians in the Scottish Football League.

He briefly played in Canada with the Calgary Kickers of the Canadian Soccer League.

He scored Airdrie's goal in the 1992 Scottish Cup Final against Rangers after coming on as a substitute (an eventual 2–1 defeat), and subsequently played in the 1992–93 European Cup Winners' Cup against Sparta Prague. In November 1994, he again came off the bench to score in a cup final, this time the winner in a 3–2 extra-time victory over Dundee in the 1994 Scottish Challenge Cup Final, and at the end of that season appeared in the 1995 Scottish Cup Final versus Celtic, but the Diamonds also lost on that occasion.

Smith joined Dunfermline Athletic in 1995 for £70,000, breaking his leg on his debut in a pre-season friendly but recovering to score several times including the goal which confirmed the club's promotion to the Premier Division. During the Pars' three-year spell in the top tier he scored 34 times, and in January 1998 he got five of his team's goals in a 7–2 Scottish Cup win over amateurs Edinburgh City.

He then had a spell at Kilmarnock, being brought in as cover for injured veteran Ally McCoist for a £150,000 transfer fee in January 2000 after a short loan period over the month prior, but he failed to make an impact during the rest of the season, scoring only once before McCoist returned and eventually was loaned to Ross County before being released, joining Raith Rovers in 2001. During his time in Kirkcaldy, the club were relegated but then won the Scottish Second Division championship.

Smith joined Clyde in summer 2003, and formed a good partnership with Ian Harty. Despite age catching up on him, Smith scored 10 league goals for the club, and almost won promotion to the Scottish Premier League, losing out to champions Inverness Caledonian Thistle by one point.

He then joined Gretna where he made a handful of appearances and helped them win the Scottish Third Division. He retired from playing in 2005, though remained at Gretna in a coaching role until the club folded in 2008.

== Personal life ==
Smith had a role as a footballer in the 2000 film A Shot at Glory, which featured Robert Duvall, Michael Keaton and Ally McCoist. Smith's character scores for the fictional club Kilnockie in the Scottish Cup semi-final (against Kilmarnock, the team he and McCoist played for in real life at the time) to send them through to play Rangers at Hampden Park.

He settled in the west of Scotland and spent time working as a football development officer.

Andy's son Jack is also a footballer and a striker, who trained as a youth with St Mirren and was playing for East Kilbride in the Lowland Football League (fifth tier) in 2016.

== Honours ==
Peterhead Highland League: 1988–89

Airdrieonians

- Scottish Challenge Cup: 1994–95
  - Scottish Cup: Runner-up 1991–92, 1994–95

Dunfermline Athletic

- Scottish First Division: 1995–96

Raith Rovers

- Scottish Second Division: 2002–03

Gretna

- Scottish Third Division: 2004–05

=== Individual ===
Airdrieonians Hall of Fame inductee
