= Sammy Conn =

Scottish footballer and manager

Personal information
- Date of birth: 26 October 1961
- Place of birth: Lanark, Scotland
- Date of death: 17 August 2014 (aged 52)
- Position: Midfielder

Youth career
- Polkemmet Juniors

Senior career*
Years	Team	Apps	(Gls)
1980–1982	Falkirk	26	(3)
1982–1986	Albion Rovers	146	(26)
1986–1987	Clydebank	19	(1)
1987–1988	Falkirk	36	(2)
1988–1993	Airdrie	126	(16)
1993–1994	Albion Rovers	38	(3)
1994–1997	Cowdenbeath		
Total		456	(58)

Managerial career
- 1996–1997: Cowdenbeath
- * Club domestic league appearances and goals

Sammy Conn (26 October 1961 – 17 August 2014) was a Scottish professional football player and manager.

== Career ==
Born in Lanark, Conn played as a midfielder for Polkemmet Juniors, Falkirk, Albion Rovers, Clydebank, Airdrie and Cowdenbeath. After being player-manager of Cowdenbeath between 1996 and 1997, Conn later worked as a youth coach at Ayr United before becoming assistant manager of Dalry Thistle.

Conn suffered from motor neurone disease. He died on 17 August 2014 at age 52.
