= Kenny Black =

Scottish footballer and manager

Personal information
- Full name: Kenneth George Black
- Date of birth: 29 November 1963 (age 62)
- Place of birth: Stenhousemuir, Scotland
- Height: 1.73 m (5 ft 8 in)
- Position: Midfielder

Senior career*
Years	Team	Apps	(Gls)
1981–1983	Rangers	24	(1)
1983–1984	Motherwell	17	(0)
1984–1989	Heart of Midlothian	178	(15)
1989–1991	Portsmouth	62	(3)
1991–1999	Airdrieonians	256	(20)
1999–2001	Raith Rovers	55	(3)
2002–2004	Airdrie United	5	(0)
Total		597	(42)

Managerial career
- 2006–2010: Airdrie United
- 2014: Motherwell (caretaker)
- * Club domestic league appearances and goals

Kenneth George Black (born 29 November 1963) is a Scottish football manager and former player who spent most of his career with Heart of Midlothian and Airdrieonians.

== Playing career ==
A left-sided defender or midfielder, Black began his playing career with Rangers in 1980 but was farmed out to Junior side Linlithgow Rose to gain competitive experience. While still a teenager, he left Ibrox permanently in 1983 for Motherwell, before joining Heart of Midlothian for £30,000 a year later.

Black was part of the Maroons side that missed out on a Scottish Premier Division and Scottish Cup double in 1985–86 before moving south when Portsmouth's £350,000 bid was accepted in 1989. He was reunited with former boss Alex MacDonald in 1991 when he joined Airdrieonians and won his first senior medal with the Diamonds, when they defeated Dundee to win the Scottish Challenge Cup in 1994–95, also collecting a second Scottish Cup runner-up medal when he appeared on the losing side in that season's final.

In 1999, Black moved to Raith Rovers. By now a veteran, he played there for a further two seasons.

== Coaching career ==
Black was appointed joint assistant-manager of the Kirkcaldy side in 2001. Managerial changes saw him leave Starks Park in early 2002 but he found a new position as assistant to former Airdrie teammate Sandy Stewart at Airdrie United, the reincarnation of Airdrieonians, later that year.

Black left Airdrie United for Leicester City in 2004, gaining a coaching position under Craig Levein. His contract at the Walkers Stadium ended when Levein was sacked in 2006 and he sealed a return to Airdrie later that year, this time as manager.

Black guided the team to the 2008–09 Scottish Challenge Cup. He lost four First Division v Second Division promotion play-off games over the course of his tenure.

On the evening of 15 June 2010, the website of The Airdrie and Coatbridge Advertiser reported that despite no official statement from the club, Black had "parted company" with Airdrie United. A few days later it was confirmed by the club that Black had been "relieved of his duties". Events took a twist on 23 June however, as the BBC reported that Black and the club had failed to agree on a compensation deal to cover the remaining two years on his contract, and that Black was still being paid. Black was said to be seeking legal advice on the matter. On 15 July 2010, it was announced that Black had been appointed as an assistant coach at the Scotland national team, and that he had come to an agreement with Airdrie United over compensation.

On 19 January 2011, Black was appointed assistant manager at Motherwell. Black and manager Stuart McCall guided the club to high league finishes in 2011–12 (third place), 2012–13 (second) and 2013–14 (second). Black was appointed as caretaker manager on 2 November 2014 after McCall resigned. He was in charge for five matches, and initially stayed on as Motherwell's assistant when Ian Baraclough was appointed manager, but was sacked on 6 February 2015. On 12 March 2015, Black again joined forces with McCall as assistant manager at Rangers; they left two months later when the club failed to gain promotion.

On 21 June 2016, Kenny Black was confirmed as assistant manager to Stuart McCall at Bradford City in the English League Division One. He left in February 2018. On 4 February 2020, he returned to Valley Parade as assistant to McCall for a second time.

== Honours ==
Airdrieonians

- Scottish Challenge Cup: 1994–95

== See also ==
- List of footballers in Scotland by number of league appearances (500+)
