= Owen Coyle =

Irish-Scottish football manager (born 1966)

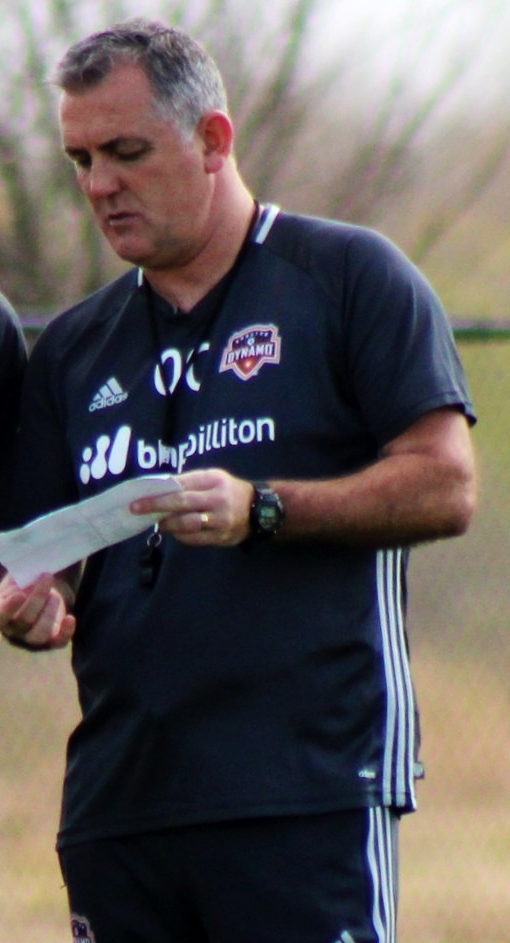
- Coyle in 2016

Personal information
- Full name: Owen Columba Coyle
- Date of birth: 14 July 1966 (age 60)
- Place of birth: Paisley, Scotland (Note: Some sources give Coyle's birthplace as Glasgow, as he described himself in interviews as "Gorbals born and bred"; however official and statistical sources give Paisley.)
- Height: 5 ft 11 in (1.80 m)
- Position: Striker

Youth career
- Renfrew YM

Senior career*
Years	Team	Apps	(Gls)
1985–1988	Dumbarton	103	(36)
1988–1990	Clydebank	63	(33)
1990–1993	Airdrieonians	123	(50)
1993–1995	Bolton Wanderers	54	(12)
1995–1997	Dundee United	38	(5)
1997–1999	Motherwell	79	(25)
1999–2001	Dunfermline Athletic	47	(10)
2000–2001	→ Ross County (loan)	5	(2)
2001–2002	Airdrieonians	45	(29)
2002–2003	Falkirk	36	(20)
2003–2004	Dundee United	3	(0)
2003–2004	→ Airdrie United (loan)	23	(13)
2004–2005	Airdrie United	34	(14)
2005–2007	St Johnstone	16	(0)
Total		669	(249)

International career
- Republic of Ireland U21
1990–1994	Republic of Ireland B		
1994	Republic of Ireland	1	(0)

Managerial career
- 2003: Falkirk
- 2005–2007: St Johnstone
- 2007–2010: Burnley
- 2010–2012: Bolton Wanderers
- 2013: Wigan Athletic
- 2014–2016: Houston Dynamo
- 2016–2017: Blackburn Rovers
- 2017–2018: Ross County
- 2019–2020: Chennaiyin
- 2020–2022: Jamshedpur
- 2022–2023: Queen's Park
- 2023–2025: Chennaiyin
- 2026: Jamshedpur
- * Club domestic league appearances and goals

Owen Columba Coyle (born 14 July 1966) is a professional football manager and former player. He played as a striker for several clubs in England and Scotland, and made one appearance for the Republic of Ireland national team.

Coyle began his career at Dumbarton, and also played for Clydebank and Airdrieonians before joining English club Bolton Wanderers in 1993. He appeared for Bolton in the Premier League before a return to Scotland with Dundee United. He went on to play for several other Scottish clubs, including Motherwell, Dunfermline Athletic, Falkirk and St Johnstone. Qualifying by descent, he played for the Republic of Ireland under-21s and B team before he made one full international appearance in 1994.

Upon retiring from playing, Coyle managed Falkirk and St Johnstone, before joining then Championship side Burnley in November 2007. In his first full season in charge, Burnley won promotion to the Premier League in 2009. He then moved to Bolton Wanderers in January 2010, halfway through his first season in the Premier League; Coyle stated this move was due to Bolton being "ten years ahead of Burnley". After leaving Bolton in October 2012, Coyle was appointed manager of Wigan Athletic in June 2013, only to leave the club six months later. He was made head coach of Houston Dynamo in December 2014, until he left by mutual agreement in May 2016. He then managed Blackburn Rovers between June 2016 and February 2017. He returned to Scotland to manage Ross County in September 2017, but resigned from this position after five months.

On 3 December 2019, Coyle was appointed as head coach of Indian club Chennaiyin. He led them from bottom of the table to the ISL final. After a stint with Jamshedpur, he returned to Scottish football in March 2022 with Queen's Park.

== Playing career ==
=== Club ===
==== Early career in Scotland ====
Coyle began his senior career with Dumbarton in 1985 where he played alongside his brothers Joe and Tommy. In 1988, he joined Clydebank.

==== Airdrieonians ====
In March 1990 a £175,000 transfer took him to Airdrieonians for the first of three spells at the club. This move was instantly successful, Coyle scoring a hat-trick on his debut and going on to finish as the Scottish League's top scorer for 1989–90. Over the next two seasons his goals helped Airdrie to promotion, a Scottish Cup final appearance in 1992, and an appearance in the 1992–93 European Cup Winners' Cup (as the Scottish Cup winners Rangers also won the Scottish Premier Division title and qualified for the UEFA Champions League).

==== Bolton Wanderers ====
In the summer of 1993, Bolton Wanderers paid £250,000 to sign Coyle, and his two-year spell in England included promotion and a brief chance to play in the FA Premier League. He was a key part of their Division One promotion winning side in 1995, scoring a 75th-minute goal against Reading in the playoff final which gave Bolton a lifeline to peg the scoreline back to 2–1. With 90 minutes on the clock, the score was 2–2 and Bolton won 4–3 in extra time to end their 15-year exile from the top flight.

==== Dundee United ====
However, in October 1995, a £400,000 transfer fee took him to Dundee United, where he was once again part of a promotion-winning side, scoring the winning goal in extra time in the second leg of the playoff against Partick Thistle.

==== Motherwell and after ====
Coyle's next move was to Motherwell in January 1997, after a move to Hibernian fell through. In March 1999 he moved to Dunfermline Athletic. After losing his place in the Pars team, he went on loan to Ross County. He rejoined Airdrieonians in 2001 and won the Challenge Cup (scoring in the final) but they went into liquidation in May 2002.

Coyle then joined Falkirk, being promoted to co-player-manager alongside John Hughes in 2003. After leaving this post he returned to Dundee United, primarily in a coaching capacity but also registering as a player. A lack of first team opportunities, however, led to him being loaned out to Airdrieonians' successors, Airdrie United; the move was subsequently made permanent. He also took up the post of assistant manager to Sandy Stewart.

==== Post-retirement ====
He played in an emergency for Burnley Reserves on 9 April 2009, scoring with a lob in a 2–0 win against Accrington Stanley, helping them win the Reserve League title. On 7 October, Coyle played again for Burnley Reserves in a 1–0 defeat to the Liverpool Reserves at Prenton Park.

On 15 November 2010, Coyle returned to playing action at the age of 44 when turning out for Bolton in their friendly match with Northern Ireland side Cliftonville. It was the first time in fifteen years that he had started a game for Bolton and he chipped in with a goal in a 2–0 Wanderers win.

=== International ===
Although born in Scotland, Coyle represented the Republic of Ireland under-21 team. Regarding his choice to represent Ireland, Coyle stated "My ambition was to play at the highest level possible and, if I'm being totally honest, I didn't and still don't think I would have been good enough to play for Scotland. But the Irish watched me play six or seven times for Dumbarton and my first game for them was actually against Scotland." Coyle's debut was in February 1987; he opened the scoring within two minutes, with Scotland going on to win 4–1.

Coyle made two substitute appearances (replacing David Kelly each time) for Republic of Ireland B against England B: at Turners Cross in Cork on 27 March 1990, and at Anfield on 13 December 1994.

Coyle went on to earn one full international cap for the Republic of Ireland team, in a friendly match played against the Netherlands in Tilburg in April 1994. The match ended in a 1–0 victory for the Republic, with Coyle coming on to replace the goalscorer Tommy Coyne in the 83rd minute.

== Managerial career ==
=== St Johnstone ===
In April 2005, Coyle was named as the new manager of St Johnstone. In March 2006, he was awarded Manager of the Month for the Scottish First Division for his team's performance. Coyle led St Johnstone to a 2–0 victory over Rangers at Ibrox to reach the semi-finals of the Scottish League Cup. It was their first win over the Glasgow club at Ibrox in 35 years. St Johnstone lost 3–1 after extra time to Hibernian in that semi-final. Saints also reached the semi-finals of the Scottish Cup thanks to away wins against SPL clubs Falkirk and Motherwell, but lost 2–1 to Celtic at Hampden in the semi-final.

In the same season, Saints also competed for the First Division championship and promotion to the SPL. On 30 March 2007, Coyle was awarded his second Scottish First Division Manager of the Month award of the 2006–07 season. Saints took the title fight with Gretna to the final day of the season, and only a last minute goal by James Grady that gave Gretna victory at Ross County denied Saints promotion.

Coyle signed a one-year extension to his contract with St Johnstone in July 2007, which would have kept him at the club until the end of the 2009–10 season. In the early part of the 2007–08 season, Coyle led Saints to the 2007 Scottish Challenge Cup Final. He accepted an offer from Burnley in the week before the final and left the club. Coyle's assistant Sandy Stewart took charge of the team for the final, which was won 3–2 against Dunfermline Athletic.

=== Burnley ===
On 21 November 2007, Burnley were granted permission to discuss their managerial vacancy with Coyle after a compensation fee was agreed with St Johnstone. He was appointed as Burnley's new manager the following day. Coyle was given a reference by then Scotland manager Alex McLeish to support his Burnley application, and was also recommended by Bolton chairman Phil Gartside after they appointed Gary Megson as their new manager, as Coyle was Gartside's second choice for the Bolton job after Megson.

In September 2008, former England striker Andy Cole credited Coyle as the reason he re-thought his decision to retire from playing at the end of the 2007–08 season. Cole spent three months on loan at Burnley that season, and Cole stated, "I went to Burnley and spoke to Owen and got a great vibe. He brought the best out of me and made me feel a lot younger than my age."

He won the September 2008 Championship Manager of the Month award after leading Burnley to five wins and a draw, which included a League Cup win over Premier League side Fulham. In November Burnley secured a victory over Premier League side Chelsea on penalties at Stamford Bridge to put them in the quarter-finals of the League Cup. In the quarter-final, Burnley defeated Arsenal 2–0. They were knocked out in the semi-finals in dramatic fashion, after overturning a 4–1 deficit by winning 3–0 at Turf Moor after 90 minutes. Burnley were little more than three minutes away from a famous win and a trip to Wembley, when Roman Pavlyuchenko scored to win the tie in extra time for Tottenham Hotspur.

Burnley, under Coyle, won promotion to the Premier League by beating Sheffield United 1–0 in the Championship Play-off Final at Wembley Stadium on 25 May 2009. The 2009–10 season was the first time Burnley had played in top tier of English football for 33 years. Coyle added to his squad by signing Tyrone Mears from Derby County for £500,000 and Steven Fletcher from Hibernian for a club record fee of £3,000,000 and also David Edgar signed on a free transfer from Newcastle United on 1 July 2009.

After speculation linking Coyle with the vacant manager's position at Celtic, on 18 June 2009, Coyle signed a contract extension at Turf Moor to stay with Burnley until the end of the 2012–13 season.

On 19 August 2009, Burnley defeated the defending Premier League champions Manchester United 1–0 at Turf Moor in their first top-flight match at home for 33 years. They went on to win their first four home games with wins against Everton 1–0 Birmingham 2–1 and Sunderland 3–1 and lose their first 5 away games.

=== Bolton Wanderers ===
In January 2010, Bolton Wanderers expressed their interest in Coyle becoming their new manager to replace the recently sacked Gary Megson, with Coyle expressing a desire to leave Burnley and take up the position. On 5 January, Burnley's chairman announced that Coyle had left the club. On 8 January, Coyle was appointed as Bolton manager. His first game in charge was a 2–0 home defeat to Arsenal. He achieved his first win on 23 January 2010, 2–0 in the FA Cup 4th round at home to Sheffield United and achieved his first league victory against former club Burnley, 1–0 on 26 January 2010. He achieved his first away victory at the club on 6 March, 2–1 at West Ham United. When Bolton next played Burnley Coyle was called "Judas" by the Burnley fans as they felt that he had betrayed them. He responded to these comments by saying that if they (Burnley fans) were going to use biblical terms about him and his time in charge of their club, he should be referred to as 'Moses' for leading them out of the wilderness. Coyle's first signings for the club were Stuart Holden from MLS side Houston Dynamo on a short-term contract and Manchester City winger Vladimir Weiss and Arsenal's Jack Wilshere on loan until the end of the season. Coyle achieved his goal of keeping Bolton in the Premier League by finishing 14th with 39 points, nine clear of relegated Burnley.

On 1 July, he signed Martin Petrov from Manchester City and Robbie Blake from Burnley on free transfers, making them his first summer signings. Coyle also later signed Marcos Alonso from Real Madrid for an undisclosed fee and also brought Ivan Klasnić back to the club on a free transfer after spending the previous season on loan at the Reebok. In January 2011, he made two further signings, buying David Wheater from Middlesbrough and signing Daniel Sturridge on loan from Chelsea until the end of the season. In his first full season at the club, Coyle's team finished 14th in the Premier League and reached the semi-final stage of the FA Cup, where they were beaten 5–0 by Stoke City.

On 13 May 2012, Bolton were relegated to The Championship, following a 2–2 draw at Stoke City on the final day of the season.

Bolton started the 2012–13 season against his former club Burnley, against whom they lost 2–0. They then went on to win against Derby County and draw against Nottingham Forest, both of which were at the Reebok Stadium. This meant the club had played three matches in a week. The following week, Bolton lost 3–1 to Hull City. In The Bolton News' report of the match, chief sports editor Marc Iles wrote, "Sections of Wanderers fans called for Owen Coyle to leave his post as the club fell to a dire 3–1 defeat at the KC Stadium, The anti-Coyle chants continued after the final whistle, leaving the club potentially with a lot to think about heading into the international break." The following match, against Watford was won 2–1, although fans still booed after the full-time whistle. They then lost to Birmingham City 2–1 at St Andrew's. Coyle's time at the Reebok Stadium came to an end on 9 October 2012, when it was confirmed by the club that Coyle's contract with Bolton had been terminated.

=== Wigan Athletic ===
On 14 June 2013, Coyle was announced as the manager of Wigan Athletic following the departure of Roberto Martínez to Everton. His first game in charge of Wigan was against Barnsley in the Championship, which Wigan won 4–0. His second game was against Manchester United in the Community Shield where United won 2–0.

Coyle left Wigan on 2 December 2013, with Wigan losing for the third time in a week, and lying 14th in the table.

=== Houston Dynamo ===
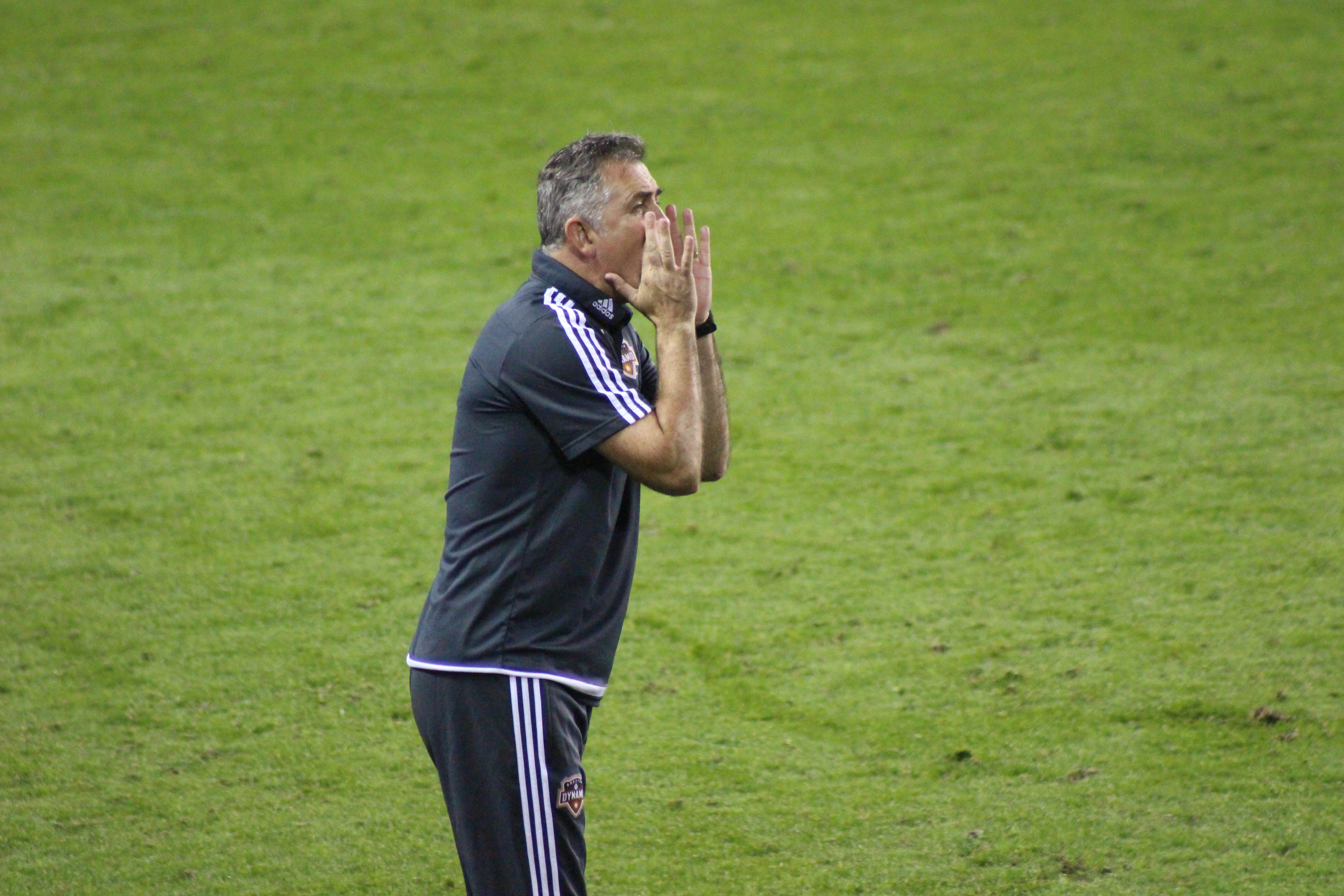
Coyle as a coach of Houston Dynamo in 2015

On 8 December 2014, Coyle signed a three-year contract to become the head coach of Major League Soccer club Houston Dynamo. The announcement was previously delayed due to the MLS Cup Final.

On 25 May 2016, Coyle and the club announced his departure by mutual consent, with Coyle stating his desire to be closer to his family who remained residing in the United Kingdom, while the Dynamo were not satisfied with the results on the pitch.

=== Blackburn Rovers ===
Coyle was appointed manager of Championship club Blackburn Rovers on a two-year contract on 2 June 2016. After thirty-seven games in charge, Coyle mutually parted company with Blackburn on 21 February 2017.

=== Ross County ===
On 28 September 2017, Scottish Premiership club Ross County appointed Coyle as their manager on a two-year contract. He resigned from this position on 1 March 2018, with the club sitting bottom of the league.

=== Chennaiyin ===
On 3 December 2019, twice Indian Super League champions Chennaiyin appointed Coyle as their head coach. After his arrival at Chennaiyin FC they came back to the winning track when he changed their style of play. Chennaiyin FC scored the most goals in the season after his arrival as manager. Chennaiyin FC qualified to playoffs and reached the final under him and in final they lost to ATK 3–1 and became runners up of ISL.

=== Jamshedpur ===
On 7 August 2020, Coyle was appointed the head coach of Indian Super League club Jamshedpur. He helped the team in winning their first ever trophy, the League Winner's Shield in 2021–22 season.

=== Queen's Park ===
In March 2022, it was confirmed that Coyle would be returning to Scottish football after being appointed as the head coach of Queen's Park and would take up the role officially on 1 June. Queen's narrowly missed out on promotion to the Scottish Premiership in the 2022–23 season, losing a final-day title decider to Dundee and then in the playoffs to Partick Thistle. Coyle left the club a few days after the playoff defeat, saying he needed time to "recharge his batteries".

=== Return to Chennaiyin ===
On 16 July 2023, Chennaiyin announced the return of Owen Coyle as the head coach ahead of the 2023-24 season. Coyle led the club to finish 6th on the table and the club qualified for the ISL playoffs for the first time in four years, where they lost to FC Goa in the knockouts.

On 17 July 2025, Chennaiyin announced they had mutually agreed to part ways with Coyle.

=== Back in Jamshedpur for second time ===
On 24 January 2026, Coyle was appointed the head coach of Indian Super League club Jamshedpur for the second time but now the club is dissolved.

== Outside football ==
Coyle was raised in the 'Little Donegal' area of the Gorbals, Glasgow, to parents from Ireland and is a frequent visitor to Gweedore, County Donegal.

In 2000, he made an appearance in the Scottish football film A Shot at Glory in 2000, alongside Robert Duvall, Michael Keaton and Ally McCoist.

Coyle is a teetotaler.

== Managerial statistics ==
As of match played 9 May 2026

Managerial record by team and tenure
Team	Nat	From	To	Record				
Team	Nat	From	To	P	W	D	L	Win %
Falkirk	(Scotland)	31 January 2003	20 May 2003	19	12	3	4	63.16
St Johnstone	(Scotland)	15 April 2005	22 November 2007	70	36	19	15	51.43
Burnley	(England)	22 November 2007	5 January 2010	116	49	29	38	42.24
Bolton Wanderers	(England)	8 January 2010	9 October 2012	126	42	24	60	33.33
Wigan Athletic	(England)	14 June 2013	2 December 2013	23	7	6	10	30.43
Houston Dynamo	(United States)	8 December 2014	25 May 2016	49	16	11	22	32.65
Blackburn Rovers	(England)	2 June 2016	21 February 2017	37	11	8	18	29.73
Ross County	(Scotland)	28 September 2017	1 March 2018	22	4	5	13	18.18
Chennaiyin	(India)	3 December 2019	14 March 2020	15	8	3	4	53.33
Jamshedpur	(India)	7 August 2020	22 March 2022	42	20	11	11	47.62
Queen's Park	(Scotland)	1 June 2022	15 May 2023	46	23	8	15	50.00
Chennaiyin	(India)	16 July 2023	17 July 2025	58	20	10	28	34.48
Jamshedpur	(India)	24 January 2026	Present	11	5	3	3	45.45
Total				634	253	140	241	39.91

== Honours ==
=== Player ===
Bolton Wanderers

- Football League First Division play-offs: 1995

Airdrieonians

- Scottish Challenge Cup: 2001–02

Falkirk

- Scottish Football League First Division: 2002–03

Airdrie United

- Scottish Football League Second Division: 2003–04

Individual

- Inducted into Airdrieonians Hall of Fame: 2002

=== Manager ===
Falkirk

- Scottish Football League First Division: 2002–03

Burnley

- Football League Championship play-offs: 2009

Chennaiyin

- Indian Super League runner-up: 2019–20

Jamshedpur

- Indian Super League League Winners Shield: 2021–22

Individual

- Premier League Manager of the Month: November 2010, March 2012

== See also ==
- List of footballers in Scotland by number of league appearances (500+)
- List of footballers in Scotland by number of league goals (200+)
- List of Republic of Ireland international footballers born outside the Republic of Ireland
