= Paul Jack =

Scottish footballer

Personal information
- Date of birth: 15 May 1965 (age 61)
- Place of birth: Malaya
- Position: Defender

Youth career
- Fallin Miners Welfare

Senior career*
| Years | Team | Apps | (Gls) |
| 1985–1989 | Arbroath | 105 | (6) |
| 1989–2000 | Airdrieonians | 309 | (11) |
| 2000–2001 | Stirling Albion | 0 | (0) |
- Bathgate Thistle
| Total | | 414 | (17) |

Managerial career
- 2009: Bathgate Thistle
- * Club domestic league appearances and goals

Paul Jack (born 15 May 1965) is a former professional footballer, best known for playing for the Airdrieonians teams of the 1990s.

== Managerial career ==
He was appointed manager of Bathgate Thistle in June 2009, but was sacked after 6 months in charge.

== Honours ==
Airdrieonians

- Scottish Challenge Cup: 1994–95
