= Paul Harvey (footballer) =

Scottish footballer

Paul Harvey (born 28 August 1968) is a Scottish former professional footballer.

Harvey began his professional career in England with Manchester United in 1986–87.

Harvey then returned to his native Scotland where he spent the rest of his playing career. He first joined Clydebank, the club of his longest service.

He then had spells of various duration with each of Airdrie, Raith Rovers, Dumbarton, Livingston, Queen of the South, Motherwell, Stenhousemuir, Airdrie United and Queen's Park. His final season in senior football was 2005/06. Harvey is now a coach at U21s side South Camlachie.

== Honours ==
Airdrieonians

- Scottish Challenge Cup: 1994–95
