= Scott Crabbe =

Scottish footballer (born 1968)

Personal information
- Full name: Scott Crabbe
- Date of birth: 12 August 1968 (age 58)
- Place of birth: Edinburgh, Scotland
- Position: Striker

Youth career
- Tynecastle Boys Club

Senior career*
Years	Team	Apps	(Gls)
1986–1992	Heart of Midlothian	116	(31)
1992–1997	Dundee United	59	(6)
1997–2000	Falkirk	129	(40)
2000–2001	Livingston	31	(5)
2000	→ Cowdenbeath (loan)	1	(0)
2001	→ Raith Rovers (loan)	16	(6)
2001–2002	Ayr United	25	(3)
2002–2004	Alloa Athletic	45	(5)
2004–2005	Albion Rovers	25	(2)
2005–2006	Raith Rovers	39	(2)
2006–2007	East Fife	10	(0)
Total		496	(100)

International career
1989	Scotland U21	2	(0)

Managerial career
- 2009-2010: East Fife (Assistant Manager)
- * Club domestic league appearances and goals

Scott Crabbe (born 12 August 1968 in Edinburgh) is a Scottish retired footballer. he played for several Scottish clubs, including Heart of Midlothian, Dundee United and Falkirk. He represented the Scotland under-21 team and was named SPFA Young Player of the Year in 1990.

== Career ==
Crabbe started his career with Heart of Midlothian. He joined Hearts from Tynecastle Boys Club in 1986 and made his league debut against Clydebank in January 1987. He started as a midfielder but the switch to striker transformed his career. Becoming a regular first team player, he formed a successful striking partnership with John Robertson. He was selected for the Scotland under-21 team and awarded the Scottish PFA Young Player of the Year.

Crabbe left Hearts in 1992 to join Dundee United. His time at the club was disrupted by a broken leg which caused him to miss United's 1994 Scottish Cup win. In five years at the club, Crabbe played around sixty matches, scoring six goals.

In 1997, he joined Falkirk. Later that year he appeared in the Scottish Cup final against Kilmarnock, which Falkirk lost 1–0. Crabbe's next club was Livingston, where he was part of the team to win the First Division in 2000-01. Soon after, however, he moved to Ayr United after a brief spell at Raith Rovers on loan. At Ayr he was part of the team to make the run to the Scottish Cup Semi-Final against Celtic which Ayr lost 3–0. Crabbe himself put out former club Dundee United in the Quarter-Final.

He then went on to play for Alloa Athletic, Albion Rovers and Raith Rovers again, where he was released in the summer of 2006, subsequently joining East Fife in the Third Division. He retired on 1 June 2007 after making ten appearances for the club. He went into become strikers coach and assistant manager at East Fife then in 2010-11 season was replaced by team player Jason Dair therefore left the club.

== Honours ==
Livingston

- Scottish First Division: 2000–01
