= George Wright (footballer, born 1969) =

South African-born Scottish television presenter, football agent and former player

Personal information
- Date of birth: 22 December 1969 (age 56)
- Place of birth: Johannesburg, South Africa
- Positions: Defender; midfielder

Youth career
- 1986–1987: Hutchison Vale Boys Club

Senior career*
Years	Team	Apps	(Gls)
1987–1995	Heart of Midlothian	70	(3)
1995–1996	Falkirk	2	(0)
1996–1998	Livingston	11	(0)
1998	Cowdenbeath	2	(0)
- Dunbar United
Total		85	(3)
- * Club domestic league appearances and goals

George Wright (born 22 December 1969) is a South African-born Scottish television presenter, football agent and former professional player who played most of his career as a defender or midfielder for Heart of Midlothian.

== Playing career ==
Wright started his youth football at Hutchison Vale Boys Club in Edinburgh. He was signed by Premier Division club Hearts in August 1987 and made his first start in the 1989–90 season. Wright scored three goals in total for the Jambos, including the opening goal in a 3–1 victory over Celtic in 1991–92 season in front over 22,000 fans at Tynecastle. He was also part of the Hearts side that won the 1991 Tennnents Sixes. Never a first team regular at Hearts, Wright left Tynecastle in 1995 but failed to hold down a first team place at Falkirk, Livingston or Cowdenbeath and retired from football in 1998 at the age of 28.

== Post-football ==
After his playing career Wright worked in TV, presenting a football show on the local Edinburgh L!VE TV and on Jo Guest In Jamaica on Men & Motors. As of 2010, Wright worked as a football agent.
