= Alan McLaren =

Scottish footballer

Personal information
- Full name: Alan James McLaren
- Date of birth: 4 January 1971 (age 55)
- Place of birth: Edinburgh, Scotland
- Position: Defender

Senior career*
Years	Team	Apps	(Gls)
1987–1994	Heart of Midlothian	182	(6)
1994–1998	Rangers	78	(5)

International career
1992–1995	Scotland	24	(0)
- * Club domestic league appearances and goals

Alan James McLaren (born 4 January 1971 in Edinburgh) is a Scottish former footballer, who played for Heart of Midlothian and Rangers.

== Football career ==
=== Club ===
McLaren started his career with Hearts in 1987 and made over 180 appearances for the Tynecastle club. He moved to Rangers in October 1994 in a £2m part-exchange deal, with Dave McPherson moving the opposite direction. He made his debut against Old Firm rivals Celtic on 30 October 1994 in a 3–1 win at Hampden Park. He was named in the SPFA Team of the Year for 1994.

He was forced to retire from football in 1998, aged 27, due to injury. His final appearance for Rangers was as captain in a 1–0 win over Dundee United in which Rangers secured their 9th title in row.

On 2 March 1999, Rangers played English club Middlesbrough in a testimonial match for McLaren at Ibrox in front of 49,468 spectators. McLaren scored a penalty in a 4–4 draw.

=== International ===
McLaren also won 24 caps for Scotland. He was named in the squad for UEFA Euro 1992, but did not feature in any matches. He was forced to miss UEFA Euro 1996 through injury, being replaced by Derek Whyte in the squad.

== Post-football career ==
McLaren became an ambassador for charity Football Aid and a regular pundit on Rangers TV.
