= Bathgate Thistle F.C. =

Association football club in Scotland

Bathgate Thistle
- Full name: Bathgate Thistle Football Club
- Nickname: Thistle
- Founded: 1937
- Ground: Creamery Park; Hardhill Road; Bathgate
- Capacity: 3,000
- Coordinates: 55°53′57″N 3°39′24″W
- Manager: Gordon Wilson
- League: East of Scotland League First Division
- 2025–26: East of Scotland League First Division, 11th of 16
Home colours	Away colours

Bathgate Thistle Football Club are a Scottish football club, based in the town of Bathgate, West Lothian. They play in the East of Scotland League First Division.

Nicknamed Thistle, they were formed in 1937 and presently play their home games at Creamery Park, which has room for 3,000 spectators. Their home shirts are royal blue with navy sleeves and shorts and socks royal blue. Away kit is all navy.

In 2006, Thistle reached the final of the Scottish Junior Cup, losing 2–1 to Auchinleck Talbot at Rugby Park, Kilmarnock, in front of around 7,000 spectators. In 2008, the club reached the final again, this time defeating Cumnock Juniors 2–1.

The Senior side is managed by Gordon Wilson. The U20's are Bathgate Juniors led by Kevin McDonald and started in 22/23 and play in the Scottish Lowland Development League. There are also various youth teams within the Bathgate Juniors set up and the Club provides the only full pathway to senior football in Bathgate.

== Coaching staff ==
Role	Name
Manager	(Scotland) Gordon Wilson
Coach	(Scotland) George Bonnar
Coach	(Scotland) Ryan Stevenson
Goalkeeping Coach	(Scotland) Jim Smith
Kitman	(Scotland) George Cunningham

== Current squad ==
As of January 2023

Note: Flags indicate national team as defined under FIFA eligibility rules; some limited exceptions apply. Players may hold more than one non-FIFA nationality.

No.	Pos.	Nation	Player
—	GK	SCO	Sean Brown
—	DF	SCO	Gregor Dryden
—	DF	SCO	Harry Maguire
—	DF	SCO	Stuart Conway
—	DF	SCO	Nathan Williamson
—	DF	SCO	James Macadam
—	DF	SCO	Grant MacDonald
—	DF	SCO	Myles Wilson
—	DF	SCO	Kyle Mooney
—	DF	SCO	Brayden Docherty
—	MF	SCO	Grant Forrester
—	FW	SCO	Michael Adams
—	MF	SCO	Fraser Cormack
—	MF	SCO	Kyle Mowatt
—	MF	SCO	Aidan Gibb
—	MF	SCO	James McCullagh
—	MF	SCO	Jordan Rodger
—	MF	SCO	Glenn Thomson
—	FW	SCO	Lewis McKenzie
—	FW	SCO	Finlay Mackay
—	FW	SCO	Jordan Devine
—	FW	SCO	Nathan Jollie

== Managerial history ==
Name	Nationality	Years
William Smith	(Scotland)	1965-1966?
Davie Kidd	(Scotland)	1974-?
Tam Connor	(Scotland)	?-1977
Robin Gibson	(Scotland)	1989?
Willie Russell	(Scotland)	1990-1992
Willie Hill	(Scotland)	?-2009
Paul Jack	(Scotland)	2009
Graeme Love	(Scotland)	2009-2012
Keith Hogg ^{c}	(Scotland)	2012
Derek Strickland	(Scotland)	2012-2013
Robert Main	(Scotland)	2013-2014
Barrie Malcolm	(Scotland)	2014-
Andy Colley	(Scotland)	2015-2017
Jim Henderson	(Scotland)	2017-2018
Michael Wilson	(Scotland)	2018
Kevin McKee	(Scotland)	2020
Andy Colley	(Scotland)	2020-2021
Stewart Devine	(Scotland)	2021-2022
Andy Malone	(Scotland)	2022-2023
Gordon Wilson	(Scotland)	2023-

^{c} Caretaker manager

== Honours ==
Scottish Junior Cup

- Winners: 2007–08
- Runners-up: 2005–06

=== Other Honours ===
- East Region Division Two champions: 1986–87, 1990–91
- East of Scotland Junior Cup winners: 1941–42, 2006–07
- St. Michael Cup winners: 1940–41, 1959–60, 2000–01
- Brown Cup winners: 1941–42
- Thornton Shield winners: 1943–44, 1944–45
- RL Rae Cup winners: 1965–66 – Manager was William Ross Smith (ex-Partick Thistle, Queen of the South and Berwick Rangers)
- Fife and Lothians Cup winners: 2009–10
