= Berwick Rangers F.C. =

Association football club in England

Berwick Rangers
- Nicknames: The Black & Gold, The Borderers, The Dream Team, The Wee Gers
- Founded: 1881; 145 years ago
- Ground: Shielfield Park, Berwick-upon-Tweed
- Capacity: 4,099 (1,366 seated)
- Coordinates: 55.760026°N 2.015753°W
- Chairman: Kevin Dixon
- Manager: Martin Scott
- League: Lowland League East
- 2025–26: Lowland League, 8th of 18
- Website: berwickrangers.com
Home colours	Away colours

Berwick Rangers Football Club is a football team based in the town of Berwick-upon-Tweed in England, who play in the Scottish football system. Founded in 1881, they currently play in the Lowland League East, the fifth tier of Scottish football, despite being based in England. They were the only club from outside Scotland in the Scottish Professional Football League until their relegation in 2019.

== History ==
Berwick Rangers was officially formed on 7 January 1881 after a match was played in the town between a team of millworkers from Dunbar and a team of railway clerks from Newcastle. For much of the club's history it was believed that they had formed in 1881, though recent research indicates that 1884 is the more likely date of formation. Their first competitive match was against another team from Berwick, 'The Royal Oaks' on 16 February 1884. Berwick Rangers won the match by "one goal to nil".

Berwick Rangers affiliated to the Scottish Football Association around 1905 and entered the Scottish Border League in 1905, followed by the Border Amateur League (1908–09). Recent research has revealed that the club joined the East of Scotland League immediately after the First World War, a new competition formed to replace the Borders League. The club made several attempts to join the North Northumberland League but were rebuffed. It was not until 1951 that they were admitted to Scottish Football League C Division (North & East). This third tier, made up largely of reserve sides, had been created in 1946 and was regionalised in 1949. The division was scrapped in 1955 and Berwick, along with the other non-reserve teams, were placed in an enlarged Division B (renamed Division Two the following season). Berwick Rangers have played in the Scottish football league system ever since, despite low attendances and frequent financial problems.

Following its foundation, the club had had a nomadic existence before eventually settling down at Shielfield Park in 1954.

A notable early success was a 3–0 win over Dundee in the Scottish Cup in 1954 in a run which saw them reach the quarter-final, only to lose to Rangers 4–0. Ten years later they reached the semi-final of the Scottish League Cup, losing to Rangers 3–1.

Arguably their greatest success came in 1967, when they beat Rangers 1–0 in the Scottish Cup under the management of player manager Jock Wallace. It was the highlight of a memorable cup run, which had seen them break a club record in beating Vale of Leithen 8–1 in the first round. The result sent shockwaves around Scottish football and led to a number of the Rangers players leaving Ibrox; it was also the club's greatest home attendance of 13,365. They were paired with Hibernian in the following round but lost 1–0 in front of a crowd of nearly 30,000.

The following years saw little progress until the late 1970s, when under the management of Dave Smith they won the Division Two title in 1979. Despite that success they were unable to build and suffered a slow decline through the 1980s. The nadir came in season 1988–89 when they were nearly bankrupted and the club were locked out of Shielfield, having to play their games elsewhere. In 1988 Jim Jefferies took over as manager and led the team to a club record 21 game unbeaten run.

The club weathered this and other crises in the early 1990s, narrowly avoiding going into administration in 1994. Later in the decade Berwick enjoyed a bit more in the way of success only missing out on promotion to Division One due to league reorganisation in 1994. They were relegated to Division Three in 1997 but under the management of Paul Smith regained promotion in 2000. Under Smith's stewardship they took both Rangers and Heart of Midlothian to replays in the Scottish Cup.

They were again relegated to the Third Division in 2005, and narrowly missed out on an instant return to the Second Division the following season, this time losing to Alloa Athletic in the Second Division play-offs. Despite losing a good deal of the squad to other clubs in the close season, manager John Coughlin exceeded expectations by rebuilding the team and guiding them to the Third Division championship in 2007, their first title in 28 years, in a season which also saw a new record for consecutive league wins.

John Coughlin resigned as Berwick Rangers manager after a 3–0 home loss to Alloa Athletic on 6 October 2007. He left with Berwick at the foot of the table with only 5 points after 9 games. Cowdenbeath coach Michael Renwick was appointed new manager on 25 October 2007. However, after a dismal season which saw Berwick finish bottom and ship 101 goals, including a 9–2 defeat to Peterhead, Renwick was relieved of his duties on 19 April 2008. The official website reported on 12 May 2008 that Camelon manager Allan McGonigal would take over as manager. He resigned from his post on 13 November 2008. His announcement came in the wake of a deal which saw a fan led consortium take control of the club. On 27 January the consortium concluded their deal to buy the club.

Following McGonigal's resignation Jimmy Crease became manager for the fourth time, initially as a caretaker, but then on a permanent basis in December 2008. Following a 4–0 defeat to Deveronvale in the second round of the 2011–12 Scottish Cup Crease stood down as manager. Player Ian Little was named caretaker manager until the end of 2011 when his position was to be reviewed. On 28 December 2011, Little was given the managers job at least until the end of the 2011–12 season. On 26 August 2012, Rangers FC played their first ever league game in England when they faced Berwick Rangers at Shielfield Park, similar to when the previous Glasgow Rangers played their famous cup game in 1967. Berwick Rangers earned another famous result, with a 1–1 draw – Fraser McLaren scoring in the 62nd minute of the game.

On 12 January 2014, Berwick Rangers sacked manager Ian Little, with the club third bottom in Scottish League Two. A few days later Colin Cameron was appointed as the club's new player manager.

On 18 May 2019, Berwick Rangers became the second club after East Stirlingshire to be relegated out of the SPFL pyramid and into the Lowland Football League, after a 7–0 loss on aggregate to Highland League champions Cove Rangers.

The Berwick Rangers Community Foundation was established in 2020.

Berwick Rangers record league performance was an 11–0 win over Vale of Leithen in the Scottish Lowland League on the 9 October 2021.

== Status ==
Berwick Rangers are one of the few teams in the world to play in a football league system other than their own country's.

Berwick-upon-Tweed is 2 1/2 miles (4 km) south of the Scottish border but is still closer to the Scottish capital Edinburgh than it is to Newcastle upon Tyne, the nearest major city on the English side of the border. It is also on the same latitude as the southern part of Glasgow. The town had previously been part of Scotland and changed hands many times until finally being taken by England in 1482. The club also formerly played in the East of Scotland League, which contains other nearby Borders teams, prior to joining the Scottish League.

There is also some controversy over the town's identity. Berwick's status as a club located in England led to the anomaly of their being the only team in the Scottish leagues who were subject to the implementation of the Taylor report following the Hillsborough disaster in 1989.

== Current squad ==
As of 18 July 2026

Note: Flags indicate national team as defined under FIFA eligibility rules; some limited exceptions apply. Players may hold more than one non-FIFA nationality.

No.	Pos.	Nation	Player
1	GK	WAL	Calum Antell (Vice-captain)
2	MF	SCO	Straun Mair
3	DF	SCO	Callum MacKay
4	DF	SCO	Alfie Robinson
5	DF	SCO	Jamie Pyper (captain)
6	MF	SCO	Alex Harris
7	MF	SCO	Kyle Somers
8	MF	SCO	Caelan McCrone
9	FW	SCO	Greg Binnie
10	FW	SCO	Danny Handling
11	FW	SCO	Michael Mbewe
12	MF	SCO	Grant Leitch (On-loan from Kelty Hearts)
14	FW	SCO	Taylor Hendry

No.	Pos.	Nation	Player
15	DF	SCO	Mark McConnell
16	MF	SCO	Michael Barefoot
17	MF	ENG	Isaac Deh
18	MF	SCO	Ben McCrystal
19	DF	SCO	Ryan Turner
20	FW	SCO	Liam Gregory
21	GK	SCO	Owen Hayward
22	FW	SCO	Josh O'Connor
23	DF	SCO	Bayley Klimionek
24	GK	SCO	Thomas Kay
—	DF	COD	Arnie Kasa
TBC	DF	SCO	Kieran Moyles (on-loan from Gala Fairydean Rovers)
TBC	DF	SCO	Ross Nelson (on-loan from Stirling Albion)
TBC	MF	SCO	Lewis Barr
TBC	MF	SCO	Jay Snoddy (on-loan from Kelty Hearts)

=== Out on loan ===
Note: Flags indicate national team as defined under FIFA eligibility rules; some limited exceptions apply. Players may hold more than one non-FIFA nationality.

No.	Pos.	Nation	Player

== Coaching staff ==
- Manager: Martin Scott
- Assistant Manager: Gary Small
- First Team Coaches: Andy Donlevy and Ross Merrilees
- Coach: Banji Koya
- Goalkeeping coach: vacant
- Club physio: Megan Dixon
- Kitman: Colin Thompson
- Groundsman: Jason Kinnon
- Head of Tactical & Opposition Scout: John Brownlie
- Chief Scout: James Cumming

== Managers ==
- (Scotland) Bobby Ancell (Dec 1950 – Apr 1952)
- (Scotland) John Thompson (Aug 1952 – Jan 1953)
- (Scotland) Jerry Kerr (Apr 1953 – Nov 1954)
- (Scotland) Danny McLennan (Nov 1957 – Jan 1960)
- (Scotland) Jimmy McIntosh (Apr 1960– Feb 1963)
- (Scotland) Ian Spence (Aug 1963 – Oct 1966)
- (Scotland) Jock Wallace (Nov 1966 – Jan 1969)
- (Scotland) Harry Melrose (Mar 1969 – Sep 1975)
- (Scotland) Walter Galbraith (Oct 1975 – Dec 1975)
- (Scotland) Gordon Haig (Jan 1976 – Sep 1976)
- (Scotland) Dave Smith (Oct 1976 – Oct 1980)
- (Scotland) Frank Connor (Nov 1980 – May 1982)
- (Scotland) Jim McSherry (Aug 1982 – Feb 1983)
- (England) Eric Tait (Feb 1983 – Oct 1987)
- (Scotland) Jimmy Thomson (Nov 1987 – Sep 1988)
- (Scotland) Jim Jefferies (Sep 1988 – May 1990)
- (Scotland) Ralph Callachan (Aug 1990 – May 1992)
- (Scotland) Jimmy Crease (Aug 1992 – Jan 1994)
- (Scotland) Tom Hendrie (Jan 1994 – Feb 1996)
- (Scotland) Ian Ross (Mar 1996 – Oct 1996)
- (Scotland) Jimmy Thomson (Nov 1996 – Aug 1997)
- (Scotland) Paul Smith (Sep 1997 – Oct 2004)
- (Scotland) Sandy Clark (Oct 2004 – May 2005)
- (United States) John Coughlin (Jul 2005 – Oct 2007)
- (Scotland) Michael Renwick (Oct 2007 – Apr 2008)
- (Scotland) Jimmy Crease (Apr 2008 – May 2008) (caretaker manager)
- (Scotland) Allan McGonigal (May 2008 – Nov 2008)
- (Scotland) Jimmy Crease (Nov 2008 – Oct 2011)
- (Scotland) Ian Little (Oct 2011 – Jan 2014)
- (Scotland) Colin Cameron (Jan 2014 – Oct 2015
- (United States) John Coughlin (Nov 2015 –August 2017)
- (Scotland) Robbie Horn (Aug 2017 – Oct 2018)
- (Scotland) Johnny Harvey (Oct 2018 – May 2019)
- (Scotland) John Brownlie (May 2019 – June 2019)
- (Scotland) Ian Little (June 2019 – May 2021)
- (Scotland) Stuart Malcolm (May 2021 – Oct 2023)
- (Scotland) Tam Scobbie (Oct 2023 - Jan 2025)
- (Scotland) Kevin Haynes (Jan 2025 - August 2026)
- (Scotland) Martin Scott (Sept 2026 - Present)

== Club records ==
- Record league win: 11–0 v Vale of Leithen, Scottish Lowland League (9 October 2021)
- Record cup win: 8–1 v Vale of Leithen, Scottish Cup First Round (December 1966)
- Record league defeat: 1–9 v Hamilton Academical, Scottish First Division (9 August 1980)
- Record home attendance: 13,365 v Rangers Scottish Cup Third Round (28 January 1967)
- Most goals in a season: 38 by Ken Bowron 1963–64
- Most goals: 115 by Eric Tait 1969–88
- Consecutive league wins: 8, Scottish Third Division 2006–07
- Longest unbeaten league run: 21, Scottish Second Division 1988–89
- Most appearances: 435, Eric Tait 1969–1988

== Honours ==
- Scottish League Division Two
  - Winners: 1978–79
  - Runners-up: 1993–94
- Scottish League Division Three
  - Winners: 2006–07
  - Runners-up: 1999–00
- East of Scotland League
  - Winners (2): 1927–28, 1946–47
  - Runners-up (2): 1923–24, 1928–29
- North Northumberland League
  - Winners: 1896–97
- Scottish Border League
  - Winners: 1898–99
- East of Scotland Shield
  - Winners (2): 1980–81, 1983–84
- King Cup
  - Winners (7): 1908–09, 1923–24, 1925–26, 1927–28, 1932–33; also won by the Reserves in 1980–81, 1989–90
