= 1995–96 Aberdeen F.C. season =

Aberdeen
1995–96 season
- Chairman: Ian Donald
- Manager: Roy Aitken
- Stadium: Pittodrie Stadium
- Scottish Premier Division: 3rd
- Scottish Cup: Semi-finals
- Scottish League Cup: Winners
- Top goalscorer: League: Scott Booth (9); All: Scott Booth; Billy Dodds (12 each)
- Highest home attendance: 20,351 vs. Rangers, 7 October 1995
- Lowest home attendance: 6,628 vs. Raith Rovers, 7 February 1996
- Average home league attendance: 12,369

Aberdeen F.C. competed in the Scottish Premier Division, Scottish League Cup and Scottish Cup in season 1995–96.

== Results ==
=== Scottish Premier Division ===
Match Day	Date	Opponent	H/A	Score	Aberdeen Scorer(s)	Attendance
1	26 August	Falkirk	A	3–2	Inglis, Dodds, Booth	6,647
2	10 September	Celtic	H	2–3	Boyd, Jess	16,489
3	16 September	Hibernian	A	1–1	Shearer	11,161
4	23 September	Kilmarnock	A	2–1	Miller, Woodthorpe	7,198
5	30 September	Raith Rovers	H	3–0	Booth (2), Miller	13,983
6	4 October	Heart of Midlothian	A	2–1	Dodds, Booth	10,927
7	7 October	Rangers	H	0–1		20,351
8	14 October	Motherwell	A	1–2	Booth	6,842
9	21 October	Partick Thistle	H	3–0	Craig, Jess, Bernard	12,719
10	28 October	Celtic	A	0–2		32,275
11	4 November	Hibernian	H	1–2	Glass	14,774
12	8 November	Falkirk	H	3–1	Dodds, Miller, McGowan	11,214
13	11 November	Rangers	A	1–1	Jess	45,427
14	18 November	Raith Rovers	A	0–1		5,786
15	2 December	Partick Thistle	A	0–1		4,286
16	9 December	Motherwell	H	1–0	Shearer	11,229
17	13 December	Kilmarnock	H	4–1	Miller (3), Windass	7,020
18	16 December	Heart of Midlothian	H	1–2	Windass	12,308
19	8 January	Hibernian	A	2–1	Miller, Dodds	8,191
20	14 January	Celtic	H	1–2	Dodds	16,760
21	16 January	Falkirk	A	1–1	Windass	4,003
22	20 January	Partick Thistle	H	1–0	Dodds	9,149
23	23 January	Kilmarnock	A	1–1	Irvine	6,703
24	7 February	Raith Rovers	H	1–0	Windass	6,628
25	10 February	Heart of Midlothian	A	3–1	Windass, Shearer, Glass	14,314
26	13 February	Motherwell	A	0–1		5,090
27	25 February	Rangers	H	0–1		19,842
28	2 March	Kilmarnock	H	3–0	Booth (2), Miller	7,177
29	16 March	Raith Rovers	A	2–2	Miller, Buchan	4,932
30	23 March	Hibernian	H	2–1	Dodds, Booth	10,924
31	1 April	Celtic	A	0–5		35,284
32	13 April	Motherwell	H	2–1	McCart, Irvine	8,943
33	16 April	Partick Thistle	A	1–1	Booth	4,568
34	20 April	Heart of Midlothian	H	1–1	Windass	11,303
35	28 April	Rangers	A	1–3	Irvine	47,247
36	4 May	Falkirk	H	2–1	Glass, McGowan	11,831

==== Final standings ====
Pos	Team	Pld	W	D	L	GF	GA	GD	Pts	Qualification or relegation
1	Rangers (C)	36	27	6	3	85	25	+60	87	Qualification for the Champions League qualifying round
2	Celtic	36	24	11	1	74	25	+49	83	Qualification for the UEFA Cup qualifying round (Note: Aberdeen qualified for the UEFA Cup by winning the League Cup.)
3	Aberdeen	36	16	7	13	52	45	+7	55	Qualification for the UEFA Cup qualifying round
4	Heart of Midlothian	36	16	7	13	55	53	+2	55	Qualification for the Cup Winners' Cup qualifying round (Note: As Rangers, the winners of the Scottish Cup, qualified for the Champions League via their league position, the place in the Cup Winners' Cup was passed to the cup runner-up, Heart of Midlothian.)
5	Hibernian	36	11	10	15	43	57	−14	43	

Source: Soccerbase
Rules for classification: 1) Points; 2) Goal difference; 3) Goals scored
(C) Champions

=== Scottish League Cup ===
Round	Date	Opponent	H/A	Score	Aberdeen Scorer(s)	Attendance
R2	19 August	St Mirren	H	3–1	Booth (2), Dodds	10,397
R3	30 August	Falkirk	A	4–1	Booth, Clark, Woodthorpe, Miller	6,387
QF	20 September	Motherwell	A	2–1	Dodds, Inglis	9,137
SF	24 October	Rangers	N	2–1	Dodds (2)	26,131
Final	26 November	Dundee	N	2–0	Dodds, Shearer	33,096

=== Scottish Cup ===
Round	Date	Opponent	H/A	Score	Aberdeen Scorer(s)	Attendance
R3	28 January	Motherwell	A	2–0	Windass, Shearer	6,035
R4	17 February	Stirling Albion	A	2–0	Windass, Shearer	3,808
QF	9 March	Airdrieonians	H	2–1	Windass, Bernard	11,749
SF	18 February	Heart of Midlothian	N	2–1	Shearer	27,785

== Squad ==
=== Appearances & Goals ===
No.	Pos	Nat	Player	Total		Premier Division		Scottish Cup		League Cup	
No.	Pos	Nat	Player	Apps	Goals	Apps	Goals	Apps	Goals	Apps	Goals
	GK	(Scotland) SCO	Michael Watt	37	0	30	0	4	0	3	0
	GK	(Netherlands) NED	Theo Snelders	9	0	7	0	0	0	2	0
	DF	(Scotland) SCO	Gary Smith	41	0	33	0	4	0	4	0
	DF	(Scotland) SCO	Stewart McKimmie (c)	37	0	29	0	3	0	5	0
	DF	(Scotland) SCO	John Inglis	30	2	24	1	1	0	5	1
	DF	(Scotland) SCO	Brian Irvine	21	3	18	3	3	0	0	0
	DF	(England) ENG	Colin Woodthrope	19	2	15	1	2	0	2	1
	DF	(Scotland) SCO	Hugh Robertson	13	0	11	0	1	0	1	0
	DF	(Scotland) SCO	Jamie Buchan	4	1	4	1	0	0	0	0
	DF	(Scotland) SCO	Kevin Christie	3	0	2	0	0	0	1	0
	DF	(Scotland) SCO	Craig Ireland	1	0	0	0	0	0	1	0
	MF	(Scotland) SCO	Stephen Glass	41	3	32	3	4	0	5	0
	MF	(Scotland) SCO	Joe Miller	40	10	31	9	4	0	5	1
	MF	(Scotland) SCO	Paul Bernard	36	2	31	1	3	1	2	0
	MF	(Scotland) SCO	Eoin Jess	32	3	25	3	2	0	5	0
	MF	(Scotland) SCO	Brian Grant	31	0	25	0	4	0	2	0
	MF	(Scotland) SCO	Peter Hetherston	16	0	11	0	0	0	5	0
	MF	(Scotland) SCO	David Rowson	9	0	9	0	0	0	0	0
	MF	(Scotland) SCO	Ray McKinnon	3	0	1	0	0	0	2	0
	MF	(Netherlands) NED	Etienne Verveer	1	0	0	0	0	0	1	0
	MF	(Scotland) SCO	Kenny Gilbert	0	0	0	0	0	0	0	0
	FW	(Scotland) SCO	Billy Dodds	40	12	31	7	4	0	5	5
	FW	(Scotland) SCO	Duncan Shearer	36	7	30	3	4	3	2	1
	FW	(Scotland) SCO	Scott Booth	30	12	24	9	2	0	4	3
	FW	(England) ENG	Dean Windass	24	9	20	6	4	3	0	0
	FW	(Scotland) SCO	Scott Thomson	5	0	4	0	0	0	1	0
	FW	(Scotland) SCO	Malcolm Kpedekpo	5	0	5	0	0	0	0	0
	FW	(Scotland) SCO	Michael Craig	1	0	1	0	0	0	0	0
	FW	(Scotland) SCO	Dennis Wyness	0	0	0	0	0	0	0	0
