= 1996–97 Aberdeen F.C. season =

Aberdeen
1996–97 season
- Chairman: Ian Donald
- Manager: Roy Aitken
- Stadium: Pittodrie Stadium
- Scottish Premier Division: 6th
- Scottish Cup: Third round
- Scottish League Cup: Quarter-finals
- UEFA Europa League: Second round
- Top goalscorer: League: Billy Dodds (14); All: Billy Dodds (22)
- Highest home attendance: 21,500 vs. Rangers, 1 December 1996
- Lowest home attendance: 8,000 vs. Kilmarnock, 1 February 1997
- Average home league attendance: 12,607

Aberdeen F.C. competed in the Scottish Premier Division, Scottish League Cup, Scottish Cup and UEFA Europa League in season 1996–97.

== Results ==
=== Scottish Premier Division ===
Match Day	Date	Opponent	H/A	Score	Aberdeen Scorer(s)	Attendance
1	10 August	Celtic	H	2–2		18,595
2	17 August	Motherwell	A	2–2	Windass, Shearer	6,206
3	25 August	Heart of Midlothian	H	4–0	Miller, Dodds, Windass, Glass	13,600
4	7 September	Raith Rovers	A	4–1	Dodds (3), Windass,	5,055
5	14 September	Kilmarnock	H	3–0	Dodds (3), Kombouare	12,000
6	21 September	Hibernian	H	0–2		12,500
7	27 September	Dundee United	A	0–1		10,359
8	12 October	Dunfermline Athletic	H	3–0	Dodds, Young	10,500
9	19 October	Rangers	A	2–2	Irvine, Dodds	50,076
10	26 October	Raith Rovers	H	1–0	Miller	11,200
11	2 November	Celtic	A	0–1		50,136
12	16 November	Dundee United	H	3–3	Kiriakov, Kombouare, Dodds	13,800
13	23 November	Hibernian	A	1–0	Windass	11,522
14	1 December	Rangers	H	0–3		21,500
15	7 December	Dunfermline Athletic	A	3–2	Miller, Rowson, Windass	5,465
16	11 December	Heart of Midlothian	A	2–1	Shearer, Windass	11,477
17	14 December	Motherwell	H	0–0		10,000
18	21 December	Kilmarnock	A	0–3		6,114
19	26 December	Celtic	H	1–2	Dodds	17,000
20	28 December	Hibernian	H	1–1	Shearer	10,000
21	1 January	Dundee United	A	0–4		9,736
22	4 January	Dunfermline Athletic	H	0–2		9,500
23	12 January	Rangers	A	0–4		47,509
24	18 January	Raith Rovers	A	2–2	Rowson, Miller	3,950
26	1 February	Kilmarnock	H	2–1	Windass (2)	8,000
27	8 February	Motherwell	A	2–2	Dodds, Martin	5,555
28	10 February	Heart of Midlothian	H	0–0		9,000
29	23 February	Dunfermline Athletic	A	0–3		5,536
30	1 March	Rangers	H	2–2	Goram, Kombouare	16,331
30	15 March	Dundee United	H	1–1	Windass	13,645
31	22 March	Hibernian	A	1–3	Craig	9,669
32	5 April	Motherwell	H	0–0		9,000
33	12 April	Heart of Midlothian	A	0–0		11,186
34	20 April	Celtic	A	0–3		47,295
35	3 May	Raith Rovers	H	2–0	Millen, Dodds	10,763
36	10 May	Kilmarnock	A	1–1	Dodds	10,027

==== Final standings ====
Pos	Team	Pld	W	D	L	GF	GA	GD	Pts	Qualification or relegation
4	Heart of Midlothian	36	14	10	12	46	43	+3	52	
5	Dunfermline Athletic	36	12	9	15	52	65	−13	45	
6	Aberdeen	36	10	14	12	45	54	−9	44	
7	Kilmarnock	36	11	6	19	41	61	−20	39	Qualification for the Cup Winners' Cup qualifying round (Note: Kilmarnock qualified for the Cup Winners' Cup as the winners of the Scottish Cup.)
8	Motherwell	36	9	11	16	44	55	−11	38	

Source: Soccerbase
Rules for classification: 1) Points; 2) Goal difference; 3) Goals scored

=== Scottish League Cup ===
Round	Date	Opponent	H/A	Score	Aberdeen Scorer(s)	Attendance
R2	13 August	Queen's Park	A	2–0	Glass, Windass	2,021
R3	3 September	Morton	A	7–3	Windass (4), Dodds (3)	6,000
QF	10 September	Dundee	A	1–2	Dodds	8,760

=== Scottish Cup ===
Round	Date	Opponent	H/A	Score	Aberdeen Scorer(s)	Attendance
R3	23 January	Hibernian	A	2–2	Booth, Dodds	9,588
R3R	28 January	Hibernian	H	0–0 (Hibernian won 5–3 on penalty kicks)		15,464

=== UEFA Cup ===
Round	Date	Opponent	H/A	Score	Aberdeen Scorer(s)	Attendance
PR2 L1	6 August	(Lithuania) Zalgiris Vilnius	A	4–1	Dodds (2), Glass, Shearer	1,800
PR2 L2	20 August	(Lithuania) Zalgiris Vilnius	H	1–3	Irvine	8,722
R1 L1	10 September	(Wales) Barry Town	H	3–1	Windass, Glass, Young	13,400
R1 L2	24 September	(Wales) Barry Town	A	3–3	Dodds (2), Rowson	6,500
R2 L1	15 October	(Denmark) Brøndby IF	H	0–2		14,159
R2 L2	29 October	(Denmark) Brøndby IF	A	0–0		12,005

== Squad ==
=== Appearances & Goals ===
No.	Pos	Nat	Player	Total		Premier Division		Scottish Cup		League Cup		UEFA Cup	
No.	Pos	Nat	Player	Apps	Goals	Apps	Goals	Apps	Goals	Apps	Goals	Apps	Goals
	GK	(Scotland) SCO	Nicky Walker	25	0	19	0	0	0	2	0	4	0
	GK	(Scotland) SCO	Michael Watt	14	0	9	0	2	0	1	0	2	0
	GK	(Scotland) SCO	Derek Stillie	8	0	8	0	0	0	0	0	0	0
	DF	(France) FRA	Antoine Kombouare	34	3	30	3	2	0	2	0	0	0
	DF	(Bulgaria) BUL	Tzanko Tzvetanov	34	0	27	0	0	0	3	0	4	0
	DF	(Scotland) SCO	Brian Irvine (c)	32	2	26	1	0	0	1	0	5	1
	DF	(England) ENG	Colin Woodthrope	27	0	19	0	2	0	1	0	5	0
	DF	(Scotland) SCO	John Inglis	23	0	14	0	2	0	3	0	4	0
	DF	(Scotland) SCO	Stewart McKimmie (c)	21	0	14	0	0	0	2	0	5	0
	DF	(Scotland) SCO	Russell Anderson	16	0	14	0	2	0	0	0	0	0
	DF	(Scotland) SCO	Jamie Buchan	15	0	14	0	0	0	0	0	1	0
	DF	(Scotland) SCO	Hugh Robertson	0	0	0	0	0	0	0	0	0	0
	DF	(Scotland) SCO	Michael Hart	0	0	0	0	0	0	0	0	0	0
	DF	(Scotland) SCO	Kevin Christie	0	0	0	0	0	0	0	0	0	0
	DF	(Portugal) POR	Samuel Quina	0	0	0	0	0	0	0	0	0	0
	DF	(Scotland) SCO	Duncan Buchan	0	0	0	0	0	0	0	0	0	0
	DF	(Scotland) SCO	Mike Newlands	0	0	0	0	0	0	0	0	0	0
	DF	(Scotland) SCO	Alan Bryson	0	0	0	0	0	0	0	0	0	0
	MF	(Scotland) SCO	David Rowson	43	3	34	2	2	0	2	0	5	1
	MF	(Scotland) SCO	Joe Miller	39	4	30	4	2	0	2	0	5	0
	MF	(Bulgaria) BUL	Illian Kiriakov	38	1	27	1	2	0	3	0	6	0
	MF	(Scotland) SCO	Darren Young	34	2	26	1	2	0	2	0	4	1
	MF	(Scotland) SCO	Stephen Glass	32	4	24	1	2	0	3	1	3	2
	MF	(Scotland) SCO	Paul Bernard	16	0	14	0	0	0	1	0	1	0
	MF	(Iceland) ISL	Haraldur Ingólfsson	6	0	6	0	0	0	0	0	0	0
	MF	(Scotland) SCO	Brian Grant	6	0	2	0	0	0	1	0	3	0
	MF	(Scotland) SCO	Derek Young	0	0	0	0	0	0	0	0	0	0
	MF	(Scotland) SCO	Paul Telfer	0	0	0	0	0	0	0	0	0	0
	MF	(Scotland) SCO	Iain Good	0	0	0	0	0	0	0	0	0	0
	FW	(Scotland) SCO	Billy Dodds	41	23	31	14	2	1	2	4	6	4
	FW	(England) ENG	Dean Windass	40	16	29	10	2	0	3	5	6	1
	FW	(Scotland) SCO	Duncan Shearer	30	5	20	4	2	0	3	0	5	1
	FW	(Scotland) SCO	Scott Booth	23	1	19	0	2	1	0	0	2	0
	FW	(Scotland) SCO	Michael Craig	7	1	5	1	0	0	1	0	1	0
	FW	(Scotland) SCO	Dennis Wyness	7	0	7	0	0	0	0	0	0	0
	FW	(Scotland) SCO	Malcolm Kpedekpo	6	0	5	0	0	0	0	0	1	0
	FW	(England) ENG	Richard Irving	0	0	0	0	0	0	0	0	0	0
	FW	(England) ENG	Noel Whelan	0	0	0	0	0	0	0	0	0	0
