= 1994–95 Aberdeen F.C. season =

Aberdeen
1994–95 season
- Chairman: Ian Donald
- Manager: Willie Miller (until February); Roy Aitken
- Stadium: Pittodrie Stadium
- Scottish Premier Division: 9th
- Scottish Cup: Fourth round
- Scottish League Cup: Semi-finals
- UEFA Cup: Preliminary round
- Top goalscorer: League: Billy Dodds (16); All: Billy Dodds (17)
- Highest home attendance: 21,000 vs. Dunfermline Athletic, 21 May 1995
- Lowest home attendance: 8,158 vs. Stranraer, 17 August 1994
- Average home league attendance: 13,590

Aberdeen F.C. competed in the Scottish Premier Division, Scottish League Cup, Scottish Cup and UEFA Europa League in season 1994–95.

== Results ==
=== Scottish Premier Division ===
Match Day	Date	Opponent	H/A	Score	Aberdeen Scorer(s)	Attendance
1	13 August	Heart of Midlothian	H	3–1	Robertson, Dodds, Booth	14,238
2	20 August	Falkirk	H	2–2	Robertson, Booth	11,143
3	27 August	Dundee United	A	1–2	Grant	9,332
4	10 September	Hibernian	A	2–2	Dodds, Grant	9,728
5	17 September	Partick Thistle	H	1–1	Dodds	10,425
6	24 September	Rangers	H	2–2	Booth, Dodds	19,191
7	1 October	Kilmarnock	A	1–2	Booth	7,445
8	8 October	Celtic	A	0–0		29,454
9	15 October	Motherwell	H	1–3	Dodds	12,489
10	22 October	Heart of Midlothian	A	0–2		10,655
11	29 October	Dundee United	H	3–0	Kane, Booth	11,744
12	5 November	Falkirk	A	1–2	Booth	9,108
13	9 November	Hibernian	H	0–0		10,882
14	19 November	Partick Thistle	A	1–2	Dodds	11,885
15	25 November	Rangers	A	0–1		45,072
16	3 December	Kilmarnock	H	0–1		10,345
17	10 December	Motherwell	A	1–0	McCart	7,020
18	26 December	Celtic	H	0–0		19,206
19	31 December	Heart of Midlothian	H	3–1	Shearer (2), Inglis	11,392
20	2 January	Dundee United	A	0–0		10,560
21	7 January	Falkirk	H	0–0		14,141
22	14 January	Partick Thistle	H	3–1	Dinnie, Shearer, Jess	9,833
23	21 January	Hibernian	A	2–4	Dodds (2)	8,076
24	4 February	Kilmarnock	A	1–3	McKimmie	9,384
25	12 February	Rangers	H	2–0	Dodds, Shearer	18,060
26	25 February	Motherwell	H	0–2		10,319
27	5 March	Celtic	A	0–2		20,261
28	11 March	Partick Thistle	A	2–2	Wright, Dodds	6,886
29	18 March	Hibernian	H	0–0		10,384
30	1 April	Kilmarnock	H	0–1		14,041
31	8 April	Rangers	A	2–3	Dodds, Shearer	44,460
32	15 April	Celtic	H	2–0	Irvine, Shearer	16,668
33	18 April	Motherwell	A	1–2	Dodds	7,155
34	29 April	Heart of Midlothian	A	2–1	Dodds (2)	11,466
35	6 May	Dundee United	H	2–1	Dodds, Shearer	20,124
36	13 May	Falkirk	A	2–0	Thomson, Glass	12,835

==== Final standings ====
Pos	Team	Pld	W	D	L	GF	GA	GD	Pts	Qualification or relegation
6	Heart of Midlothian	36	12	7	17	44	51	−7	43	
7	Kilmarnock	36	11	10	15	40	48	−8	43	
8	Partick Thistle	36	10	13	13	40	50	−10	43	Qualification for the Intertoto Cup group stage (Note: Partick Thistle qualified for the 1995 UEFA Intertoto Cup as the highest ranked Scottish club to apply for a place in the competition.)
9	Aberdeen (O)	36	10	11	15	43	46	−3	41	Qualification for the Play-off
10	Dundee United (R)	36	9	9	18	40	56	−16	36	Relegation to the 1995–96 Scottish First Division

Updated to match(es) played on end of season. Source: Soccerbase
Rules for classification: 1) Points; 2) Goal difference; 3) Goals scored
(O) Play-off winners; (R) Relegated

==== Relegation play-offs ====
Play-off	Date	Opponent	H/A	Score	Aberdeen Scorer(s)	Attendance
L1	21 May	Dunfermline Athletic	H	3–1	Shearer (2), Glass	21,000
L2	25 May	Dunfermline Athletic	A	3–1	Dodds, Miller, Glass	16,000

=== Scottish League Cup ===
Round	Date	Opponent	H/A	Score	Aberdeen Scorer(s)	Attendance
R2	17 August	Stranraer	H	1–0	Shearer	8,158
R3	30 August	Partick Thistle	A	5–0	Shearer (3), Kane, Dodds	5,046
QF	21 September	Falkirk	A	4–1	Booth (3), Rice	9,450
SF	26 October	Celtic	N	0–1		44,000

=== Scottish Cup ===
Round	Date	Opponent	H/A	Score	Aberdeen Scorer(s)	Attendance
R3	28 January	Stranraer	H	1–0	Jess	9,183
R4	18 February	Stenhousemuir	A	0–2		3,452

=== UEFA Cup ===
Round	Date	Opponent	H/A	Score	Aberdeen Scorer(s)	Attendance
PR L1	9 August	(Latvia) Skonto FC	A	0–0		2,300
PR L2	23 August	(Latvia) Skonto FC	H	1–1	Kane	8,500

Skonto win on away goals

== Squad ==
=== Appearances & Goals ===
No.	Pos	Nat	Player	Total		Premier Division		Scottish Cup		League Cup		UEFA Cup	
No.	Pos	Nat	Player	Apps	Goals	Apps	Goals	Apps	Goals	Apps	Goals	Apps	Goals
	GK	(Netherlands) NED	Theo Snelders	33	0	26	0	2	0	3	0	2	0
	GK	(Scotland) SCO	Michael Watt	15	0	14	0	0	0	1	0	0	0
	DF	(Scotland) SCO	Stephen Wright	44	1	36	1	2	0	4	0	2	0
	DF	(Scotland) SCO	Stewart McKimmie (c)	42	1	36	1	0	0	4	0	2	0
	DF	(Scotland) SCO	Gary Smith	37	0	33	0	2	0	2	0	0	0
	DF	(Scotland) SCO	Brian Irvine	24	1	19	1	1	0	2	0	2	0
	DF	(Scotland) SCO	John Inglis	20	1	18	1	2	0	0	0	0	0
	DF	(England) ENG	Colin Woodthrope	19	0	14	0	0	0	3	0	2	0
	DF	(Scotland) SCO	David Winnie	14	0	8	0	0	0	4	0	2	0
	DF	(Scotland) SCO	Hugh Robertson	6	2	3	2	0	0	2	0	1	0
	MF	(Scotland) SCO	Brian Grant	40	2	34	2	1	0	4	0	1	0
	MF	(Scotland) SCO	Paul Kane	34	4	28	2	2	0	3	1	1	1
	MF	(Scotland) SCO	Joe Miller	34	1	29	1	2	0	2	0	1	0
	MF	(Scotland) SCO	Eoin Jess	30	2	25	1	2	1	3	0	0	0
	MF	(Scotland) SCO	Peter Hetherston	27	0	24	0	1	0	1	0	1	0
	MF	(Scotland) SCO	Ray McKinnon	26	0	20	0	1	0	3	0	2	0
	MF	(Scotland) SCO	Stephen Glass	23	3	21	3	2	0	0	0	0	0
	MF	(Scotland) SCO	Roy Aitken	2	0	2	0	0	0	0	0	0	0
	FW	(Scotland) SCO	Billy Dodds	44	17	36	16	2	0	4	1	2	0
	FW	(Scotland) SCO	Duncan Shearer	31	13	25	9	2	0	2	4	2	0
	FW	(Scotland) SCO	Scott Booth	18	9	12	6	0	0	4	3	2	0
	FW	(Scotland) SCO	Scott Thomson	12	1	11	1	1	0	0	0	0	0
	FW	(Scotland) SCO	Malcolm Kpedekpo	1	0	1	0	0	0	0	0	0	0

*League appearances and goals include relegation play-off
