= 1997–98 Aberdeen F.C. season =

Aberdeen
1997–98 season
- Chairman: Ian Donald
- Manager: Roy Aitken (until 10 November); Keith Burkinshaw (interim); Alex Miller (from November)
- Stadium: Pittodrie Stadium
- Scottish Premier Division: 6th
- Scottish Cup: Third round
- Scottish League Cup: Quarter-finals
- Top goalscorer: League: Eoin Jess (10); All: Billy Dodds (12)
- Highest home attendance: 18,205 vs. Rangers, 15 November 1997
- Lowest home attendance: 8,661 vs. Dunfermline Athletic, 28 January 1998
- Average home league attendance: 13,175

Aberdeen F.C. competed in the Scottish Premier Division, Scottish League Cup and Scottish Cup in season 1997–98.

They finished sixth in the Scottish Premier Division and were eliminated in the third round of the Scottish Cup. They reached the quarter-final of the Scottish League Cup. Manager Roy Aitken was sacked in November following a 0–5 defeat to Dundee United and was replaced by Alex Miller.

== Results ==
=== Scottish Premier Division ===
| Match Day | Date | Opponent | H/A | Score | Aberdeen Scorer(s) | Attendance |
|---|---|---|---|---|---|---|
| 1 | 2 August | Kilmarnock | H | 0–0 | | 12,500 |
| 2 | 16 August | Heart of Midlothian | A | 1–4 | Newell | 12,000 |
| 3 | 23 August | Motherwell | H | 1–3 | Rowson | 11,522 |
| 4 | 30 August | Dundee United | H | 1–1 | Dodds | 12,060 |
| 5 | 13 September | Rangers | A | 3–3 | Dodds, Inglis, Newell | 50,030 |
| 6 | 20 September | Celtic | A | 0–2 | | 49,017 |
| 7 | 27 September | Dunfermline Athletic | H | 1–2 | Dodds | 9,000 |
| 8 | 4 October | St Johnstone | A | 0–1 | | 6,290 |
| 9 | 18 October | Hibernian | H | 2–0 | Dodds, Glass | 11,708 |
| 10 | 25 October | Motherwell | A | 2–1 | Windass (2) | 6,065 |
| 11 | 1 November | Heart of Midlothian | H | 1–4 | Windass | 15,100 |
| 12 | 9 November | Dundee United | A | 0–5 | | 7,893 |
| 13 | 15 November | Rangers | H | 1–1 | Jess | 18,205 |
| 14 | 22 November | Dunfermline Athletic | A | 1–1 | Dodds | 6,738 |
| 15 | 6 December | St Johnstone | H | 1–1 | Rowson | 10,974 |
| 16 | 9 December | Celtic | H | 0–2 | | 16,981 |
| 17 | 13 December | Hibernian | A | 2–2 | Dodds, Jess | 10,001 |
| 18 | 20 December | Kilmarnock | A | 0–1 | | 8,452 |
| 19 | 27 December | Motherwell | H | 3–0 | Jess (2), Windass | 13,038 |
| 20 | 3 January | Dundee United | H | 1–0 | Windass | 17,025 |
| 21 | 10 January | Rangers | A | 0–2 | | 49,542 |
| 22 | 28 January | Dunfermline Athletic | H | 2–0 | Jess (2), Smith | 8,661 |
| 23 | 2 February | Celtic | A | 1–3 | Rowson | 46,606 |
| 24 | 7 February | Hibernian | H | 3–0 | Jess, Newell, Miller | 12,043 |
| 25 | 21 February | St Johnstone | A | 1–0 | Dodds | 6,570 |
| 26 | 25 February | Heart of Midlothian | A | 1–3 | Jess | 17,600 |
| 27 | 28 February | Kilmarnock | H | 0–0 | | 10,423 |
| 28 | 14 March | Dunfermline Athletic | A | 3–3 | Rowson (2), O'Neil | 5,917 |
| 29 | 21 March | Celtic | H | 0–1 | | 18,009 |
| 30 | 28 March | Hibernian | A | 1–1 | Jess | 12,966 |
| 31 | 4 April | St Johnstone | H | 0–1 | | 9,022 |
| 32 | 11 April | Dundee United | A | 0–0 | | 9,155 |
| 33 | 19 April | Rangers | H | 1–0 | Glass | 17,981 |
| 34 | 25 April | Kilmarnock | A | 1–2 | Dodds | 8,212 |
| 35 | 2 May | Heart of Midlothian | H | 2–2 | Jess, Newell | 12,899 |
| 36 | 9 May | Motherwell | A | 2–1 | Dodds (2) | 5,861 |

==== Final standings ====
| Pos | Team | Pld | W | D | L | GF | GA | GD | Pts | Qualification or relegation |
|---|---|---|---|---|---|---|---|---|---|---|
| 4 | Kilmarnock | 36 | 13 | 11 | 12 | 40 | 52 | −12 | 50 | Qualification for the UEFA Cup first qualifying round |
| 5 | St Johnstone | 36 | 13 | 9 | 14 | 38 | 42 | −4 | 48 | |
| 6 | Aberdeen | 36 | 9 | 12 | 15 | 39 | 53 | −14 | 39 | |
| 7 | Dundee United | 36 | 8 | 13 | 15 | 43 | 51 | −8 | 37 | |
| 8 | Dunfermline Athletic | 36 | 8 | 13 | 15 | 43 | 68 | −25 | 37 | |

Source: Rec.Sport.Soccer Statistics Foundation
Rules for classification: 1) Points; 2) Goal difference; 3) Goals scored

=== Scottish League Cup ===
| Round | Date | Opponent | H/A | Score | Aberdeen Scorer(s) | Attendance |
|---|---|---|---|---|---|---|
| R2 | 13 August | Dumbarton | A | 5–1 | Newell (3), Miller, Jess | 1,739 |
| R3 | 19 August | Dundee | A | 3–0 | Dodds (2), Newell | 7,457 |
| QF | 10 September | Stirling Albion | A | 2–0 | Miller, Glass | 3,800 |
| SF | 15 October | Dundee United | N | 1–3 | Windass | 10,456 |

=== Scottish Cup ===
| Round | Date | Opponent | H/A | Score | Aberdeen Scorer(s) | Attendance |
|---|---|---|---|---|---|---|
| R3 | 24 January | Dundee United | A | 0–1 | | 11,488 |

== Squad ==
=== Appearances & Goals ===
| No. | Pos | Nat | Player | Total | | Premier Division | | Scottish Cup | | League Cup | |
| No. | Pos | Nat | Player | Apps | Goals | Apps | Goals | Apps | Goals | Apps | Goals |
|---|---|---|---|---|---|---|---|---|---|---|---|
| | GK | (Scotland) SCO | Jim Leighton (c) | 37 | 0 | 34 | 0 | 1 | 0 | 2 | 0 |
| | GK | (Scotland) SCO | Derek Stillie | 4 | 0 | 2 | 0 | 0 | 0 | 2 | 0 |
| | DF | (Scotland) SCO | Gary Smith | 34 | 1 | 31 | 1 | 1 | 0 | 2 | 0 |
| | DF | (Scotland) SCO | Brian O'Neil | 32 | 1 | 27 | 1 | 1 | 0 | 4 | 0 |
| | DF | (Scotland) SCO | John Inglis | 28 | 1 | 25 | 1 | 1 | 0 | 2 | 0 |
| | DF | (Scotland) SCO | Russell Anderson | 28 | 0 | 26 | 0 | 0 | 0 | 2 | 0 |
| | DF | (Scotland) SCO | Derek Whyte | 20 | 0 | 19 | 0 | 1 | 0 | 0 | 0 |
| | DF | (France) FRA | Antoine Kombouare | 16 | 0 | 13 | 0 | 0 | 0 | 3 | 0 |
| | DF | (Bulgaria) BUL | Tzanko Tzvetanov | 15 | 0 | 11 | 0 | 0 | 0 | 4 | 0 |
| | DF | (Scotland) SCO | Jamie Buchan | 11 | 0 | 10 | 0 | 0 | 0 | 1 | 0 |
| | DF | (Scotland) SCO | Michael Hart | 0 | 0 | 0 | 0 | 0 | 0 | 0 | 0 |
| | MF | (Scotland) SCO | Eoin Jess | 39 | 10 | 35 | 9 | 1 | 0 | 3 | 1 |
| | MF | (Scotland) SCO | Stephen Glass | 34 | 3 | 31 | 2 | 1 | 0 | 2 | 1 |
| | MF | (Scotland) SCO | David Rowson | 33 | 5 | 29 | 5 | 0 | 0 | 4 | 0 |
| | MF | (Scotland) SCO | Joe Miller | 32 | 3 | 28 | 1 | 0 | 0 | 4 | 2 |
| | MF | (Scotland) SCO | Paul Bernard | 22 | 0 | 17 | 0 | 1 | 0 | 4 | 0 |
| | MF | (Bulgaria) BUL | Illian Kiriakov | 16 | 0 | 15 | 0 | 1 | 0 | 0 | 0 |
| | MF | (Northern Ireland) NIR | Michael O'Neill | 8 | 0 | 7 | 0 | 1 | 0 | 0 | 0 |
| | MF | (Scotland) SCO | Darren Young | 6 | 0 | 5 | 0 | 0 | 0 | 1 | 0 |
| | MF | (Scotland) SCO | Derek Young | 0 | 0 | 0 | 0 | 0 | 0 | 0 | 0 |
| | MF | (Scotland) SCO | Iain Good | 0 | 0 | 0 | 0 | 0 | 0 | 0 | 0 |
| | FW | (Scotland) SCO | Billy Dodds | 38 | 12 | 34 | 10 | 1 | 0 | 3 | 2 |
| | FW | (England) ENG | Dean Windass | 28 | 6 | 23 | 5 | 1 | 0 | 4 | 1 |
| | FW | (England) ENG | Mike Newell | 26 | 8 | 21 | 4 | 1 | 0 | 4 | 4 |
| | FW | (Scotland) SCO | Ricky Gillies | 22 | 0 | 20 | 0 | 0 | 0 | 2 | 0 |
| | FW | (Scotland) SCO | Michael Craig | 1 | 0 | 0 | 0 | 0 | 0 | 1 | 0 |
| | FW | (Scotland) SCO | Duncan Shearer | 0 | 0 | 0 | 0 | 0 | 0 | 0 | 0 |
| | FW | (Scotland) SCO | Dennis Wyness | 0 | 0 | 0 | 0 | 0 | 0 | 0 | 0 |
