= 1998–99 Aberdeen F.C. season =

Aberdeen
1998–99 season
- Chairman: Stewart Milne
- Manager: Alex Miller (until November); Paul Hegarty (interim)
- Stadium: Pittodrie Stadium
- Scottish Premier League: 8th
- Scottish Cup: Third round
- Scottish League Cup: Fourth round
- Top goalscorer: League: Eoin Jess (14); All: Eoin Jess (14)
- Highest home attendance: 22,000 vs. Manchester United, Teddy Scott Testimonial, 18 January 1999; 19,537 vs. Rangers, 30 January 1999
- Lowest home attendance: 9,048 vs. Kilmarnock, 10 April 1999
- Average home league attendance: 11,959

Aberdeen F.C. competed in the inaugural Scottish Premier League, Scottish League Cup and Scottish Cup in season 1998–99.

== Results ==
=== Scottish Premier League ===
| Match Day | Date | Opponent | H/A | Score | Aberdeen Scorer(s) | Attendance |
|---|---|---|---|---|---|---|
| 1 | 1 August | Dundee | A | 2–0 | Jess, Hignett | 7,811 |
| 2 | 16 August | Celtic | H | 3–2 | Perry, Hignett, Blinker | 16,640 |
| 3 | 22 August | Heart of Midlothian | A | 0–2 | | 14,952 |
| 4 | 29 August | Dunfermline Athletic | A | 1–1 | Perry | 6,463 |
| 5 | 12 September | Motherwell | H | 1–1 | Jess | 11,760 |
| 6 | 19 September | St Johnstone | A | 0–2 | | 5,814 |
| 7 | 23 September | Rangers | H | 1–1 | Jess | 17,862 |
| 8 | 27 September | Kilmarnock | H | 0–1 | | 13,048 |
| 9 | 4 October | Dundee United | A | 0–1 | | 8,933 |
| 10 | 17 October | Dundee | H | 2–2 | Jess (2) | 10,004 |
| 11 | 24 October | Celtic | A | 0–2 | | 60,081 |
| 12 | 31 October | Motherwell | A | 2–2 | Newell, Winters | 8,146 |
| 13 | 7 November | Dunfermline Athletic | H | 2–1 | Jess (2) | 10,293 |
| 14 | 14 November | Rangers | A | 1–2 | Jess | 49,479 |
| 15 | 21 November | St Johnstone | H | 0–1 | | 10,044 |
| 16 | 28 November | Dundee United | H | 0–3 | | 11,964 |
| 17 | 5 December | Kilmarnock | A | 0–4 | | 9,785 |
| 18 | 12 December | Heart of Midlothian | H | 2–0 | Winters, Jess | 11,137 |
| 19 | 19 December | Dundee | A | 2–1 | Winters (2) | 6,340 |
| 20 | 26 December | Dunfermline Athletic | A | 2–1 | Inglis, Jess | 7,873 |
| 21 | 29 December | Motherwell | H | 1–1 | Jess | 15,269 |
| 22 | 2 January | St Johnstone | A | 1–4 | Buchan | 8,971 |
| 23 | 30 January | Rangers | H | 2–4 | Newell, Jess | 19,537 |
| 24 | 6 February | Kilmarnock | H | 2–1 | Jess, Mayer | 9,299 |
| 25 | 20 February | Dundee United | A | 0–3 | | 8,309 |
| 26 | 27 February | Heart of Midlothian | A | 2–0 | Wyness, Bernard | 13,957 |
| 27 | 14 March | Celtic | H | 1–5 | Winters | 16,825 |
| 28 | 20 March | Motherwell | A | 1–1 | Winters | 6,963 |
| 29 | 3 April | Dunfermline Athletic | H | 3–1 | Winters (3) | 11,371 |
| 30 | 10 April | Kilmarnock | A | 2–4 | Winters, Hamilton | 9,048 |
| 31 | 17 April | Dundee United | H | 0–4 | | 11,603 |
| 32 | 25 April | Rangers | A | 1–3 | Perry | 49,145 |
| 33 | 1 May | St Johnstone | H | 1–0 | Winters | 9,561 |
| 34 | 8 May | Dundee | H | 1–2 | Winters | 9,057 |
| 35 | 15 May | Celtic | A | 2–3 | Mayer, Perry | 59,138 |
| 36 | 23 May | Heart of Midlothian | H | 2–5 | Buchan, Jess | 13,042 |

==== Final standings ====
| Pos | Team | Pld | W | D | L | GF | GA | GD | Pts | Qualification or relegation |
|---|---|---|---|---|---|---|---|---|---|---|
| 6 | Heart of Midlothian | 36 | 11 | 9 | 16 | 44 | 50 | −6 | 42 | |
| 7 | Motherwell | 36 | 10 | 11 | 15 | 35 | 54 | −19 | 41 | |
| 8 | Aberdeen | 36 | 10 | 7 | 19 | 43 | 71 | −28 | 37 | |
| 9 | Dundee United | 36 | 8 | 10 | 18 | 37 | 48 | −11 | 34 | |
| 10 | Dunfermline Athletic (R) | 36 | 4 | 16 | 16 | 28 | 59 | −31 | 28 | Relegation to the 1999–2000 Scottish First Division |

Updated to match(es) played on end of season. Source: Soccerway and SPL official website
Rules for classification: 1) Points; 2) Goal difference; 3) Goals scored
(R) Relegated

=== Scottish League Cup ===
| Round | Date | Opponent | H/A | Score | Aberdeen Scorer(s) | Attendance |
|---|---|---|---|---|---|---|
| R2 | 8 August | Inverness Caledonian Thistle | A | 3–0 | Dodds (3) | 5,164 |
| R3 | 19 August | Hibernian | A | 0–1 | | 7,457 |

=== Scottish Cup ===
| Round | Date | Opponent | H/A | Score | Aberdeen Scorer(s) | Attendance |
|---|---|---|---|---|---|---|
| R3 | 23 January | Livingston | H | 0–1 | | 10,311 |

== Squad ==
=== Appearances & Goals ===
| No. | Pos | Nat | Player | Total | | SPL | | Scottish Cup | | League Cup | |
| No. | Pos | Nat | Player | Apps | Goals | Apps | Goals | Apps | Goals | Apps | Goals |
|---|---|---|---|---|---|---|---|---|---|---|---|
| 1 | GK | (Scotland) SCO | Jim Leighton | 24 | 0 | 22 | 0 | 0 | 0 | 2 | 0 |
| 2 | DF | (Scotland) SCO | Mark Perry | 35 | 4 | 32 | 4 | 1 | 0 | 2 | 0 |
| 3 | DF | (Scotland) SCO | Derek Whyte (c) | 38 | 0 | 35 | 0 | 1 | 0 | 2 | 0 |
| 4 | DF | (England) ENG | Nigel Pepper | 10 | 0 | 10 | 0 | 0 | 0 | 0 | 0 |
| 5 | DF | (Scotland) SCO | John Inglis | 20 | 1 | 17 | 1 | 1 | 0 | 2 | 0 |
| 6 | DF | (Scotland) SCO | Gary Smith | 33 | 0 | 30 | 0 | 1 | 0 | 2 | 0 |
| 7 | MF | (England) ENG | Craig Hignett | 15 | 2 | 13 | 2 | 0 | 0 | 2 | 0 |
| 7 | FW | (Scotland) SCO | Jim Hamilton | 7 | 1 | 7 | 1 | 0 | 0 | 0 | 0 |
| 8 | MF | (Scotland) SCO | Eoin Jess | 39 | 14 | 36 | 14 | 1 | 0 | 2 | 0 |
| 9 | FW | (England) ENG | Mike Newell | 24 | 2 | 23 | 2 | 1 | 0 | 0 | 0 |
| 10 | FW | (Scotland) SCO | Billy Dodds | 8 | 3 | 6 | 0 | 0 | 0 | 2 | 3 |
| 10 | MF | (Germany) GER | Andreas Mayer | 13 | 2 | 13 | 2 | 0 | 0 | 0 | 0 |
| 11 | MF | (Bulgaria) BUL | Illian Kiriakov | 25 | 0 | 22 | 0 | 1 | 0 | 2 | 0 |
| 12 | MF | (Scotland) SCO | Andy Dow | 28 | 0 | 25 | 0 | 1 | 0 | 2 | 0 |
| 13 | GK | (Scotland) SCO | Derek Stillie | 9 | 0 | 8 | 0 | 1 | 0 | 0 | 0 |
| 14 | MF | (Scotland) SCO | Paul Bernard | 9 | 1 | 9 | 1 | 0 | 0 | 0 | 0 |
| 15 | DF | (Scotland) SCO | Russell Anderson | 18 | 0 | 16 | 0 | 0 | 0 | 2 | 0 |
| 16 | DF | (Scotland) SCO | Jamie Buchan | 25 | 2 | 24 | 2 | 1 | 0 | 0 | 0 |
| 17 | MF | (Scotland) SCO | David Rowson | 24 | 0 | 21 | 0 | 1 | 0 | 2 | 0 |
| 18 | FW | (Scotland) SCO | Ricky Gillies | 13 | 0 | 11 | 0 | 0 | 0 | 2 | 0 |
| 19 | MF | (Scotland) SCO | Darren Young | 11 | 0 | 11 | 0 | 0 | 0 | 0 | 0 |
| 20 | FW | (Scotland) SCO | Dennis Wyness | 15 | 1 | 15 | 1 | 0 | 0 | 0 | 0 |
| 21 | MF | (Scotland) SCO | Derek Young | 5 | 0 | 4 | 0 | 0 | 0 | 1 | 0 |
| 22 | DF | (Scotland) SCO | Michael Hart | 14 | 0 | 13 | 0 | 1 | 0 | 0 | 0 |
| 23 | GK | (Scotland) SCO | Ryan Esson | 0 | 0 | 0 | 0 | 0 | 0 | 0 | 0 |
| 24 | MF | (Scotland) SCO | Russell Duncan | 0 | 0 | 0 | 0 | 0 | 0 | 0 | 0 |
| 25 | DF | (Scotland) SCO | Stuart McCaffrey | 0 | 0 | 0 | 0 | 0 | 0 | 0 | 0 |
| 26 | FW | (Scotland) SCO | Robbie Winters | 29 | 12 | 28 | 12 | 1 | 0 | 0 | 0 |
| 27 | MF | (Iceland) ISL | Baldur Bett | 1 | 0 | 1 | 0 | 0 | 0 | 0 | 0 |
| 28 | MF | (Scotland) SCO | Iain Good | 1 | 0 | 1 | 0 | 0 | 0 | 0 | 0 |
| 29 | FW | (Scotland) SCO | Darren Mackie | 0 | 0 | 0 | 0 | 0 | 0 | 0 | 0 |
| 30 | FW | (Scotland) SCO | Alex Notman | 2 | 0 | 2 | 0 | 0 | 0 | 0 | 0 |
| 31 | MF | (Scotland) SCO | Fergus Tiernan | 0 | 0 | 0 | 0 | 0 | 0 | 0 | 0 |
| 40 | GK | (England) ENG | Tony Warner | 6 | 0 | 6 | 0 | 0 | 0 | 0 | 0 |
