= Eoin Jess =

Scottish footballer

Personal information
- Date of birth: 13 December 1970 (age 55)
- Place of birth: Portsoy, Aberdeenshire, Scotland
- Position: Attacking midfielder

Youth career
- 1984–1987: Rangers
- 1987–1989: Aberdeen

Senior career*
Years	Team	Apps	(Gls)
1989–1996	Aberdeen	201	(50)
1996–1997	Coventry City	39	(1)
1997–2001	Aberdeen	111	(29)
2001	→ Bradford City (loan)	17	(3)
2001–2002	Bradford City	45	(14)
2002–2005	Nottingham Forest	86	(7)
2005–2007	Northampton Town	38	(1)
Total		537	(105)

International career
1989–1992	Scotland U21	9	(1)
1992–1999	Scotland	18	(2)
1994–1996	Scotland B	2	(0)
- * Club domestic league appearances and goals

Eoin Jess (born 13 December 1970) is a Scottish football coach and former player.

As a player he was an attacking midfielder who notably played in the Premier League for Coventry City and Bradford City, and in the Scottish Premier League for Aberdeen. He also played in the Football League for Nottingham Forest and Northampton Town. He was capped 18 times by Scotland, scoring two goals. He is ranked 11th on Aberdeen's all-time appearances list.

Following retirement, Jess spent time as an academy coach initially returning to former club Nottingham Forest before later having a spell with Peterborough United.

== Club career ==
=== Aberdeen ===
Born in the town of Portsoy in Aberdeenshire, Jess began his career in Glasgow as a trainee striker at Rangers (alongside future Scotland teammate John Spencer) but was allowed to leave in 1987; he soon moved back to his home region, signing for Aberdeen. Having made his debut at the end of the 1988–89 season, 18-year-old Jess made an impact in the first team from the outset of the following campaign, starting against Rapid Vienna in the UEFA Cup and against Rangers in the 1989 Scottish League Cup final at Hampden Park, which Aberdeen won 2–1. The club finished runners-up in the Premier Division, and Jess picked up another winner's medal as an unused substitute in the 1990 Scottish Cup final.

In 1990–91 he scored 13 league goals and linked up with Hans Gillhaus to great effect as Aberdeen missed out on the title on the final day. The strikes including a hat-trick away to Dundee United, four away to Dunfermline and three across two home wins over Celtic. He won the PFA Scotland Young Player of the Year award for the season. Although Jess played 42 games in 1991–92, the season was a disappointment as Aberdeen finished only 6th in the league. He scored in a September victory over Rangers at Ibrox Stadium which proved to be Aberdeen's last win at that venue until 2017.

1992–93 brought an improvement as the club were league runners-up and reached both cup finals. Jess scored the winning goal in the semi-final of the 1992–93 Scottish League Cup against Celtic and played all 120 minutes of the final which ended in a 2–1 defeat to Rangers. In March 1993 he suffered a fractured ankle in the quarter-final of the 1992–93 Scottish Cup against Clydebank but was rushed back to fitness after only two months out and appeared as a substitute in the final of the competition, which Aberdeen again lost 2–1 to Rangers. Despite failing to win any trophies and missing part of the season with his injury, he won the PFA Young Player award for a second time.

In 1993–94 Jess helped Aberdeen to another second-place finish in the Premier Division. He also scored five goals in four matches in the Cup Winners' Cup, finishing joint-top scorer in the competition. The next season almost ended in relegation for the club and Jess started only 15 league games due to a persistent foot injury. He returned as a regular starter in 1995–96 playing in a more withdrawn central midfield role to accommodate strikers Dodds, Booth and Shearer. He produced an impressive performance in the semi-final of the League Cup as Aberdeen overcame Rangers, scored a long-range goal in a league game against the same opponents a few weeks later and was in the team which won the 1995 Scottish League Cup Final, beating Dundee.

Following this victory, he decided to seek a new challenge in his career and requested a move with his contract due to expire. As he had impressed in Europe against Italian opposition (Torino), Serie A clubs showed an interest and Jess has stated that Sampdoria were keen to sign him under the Bosman ruling at the end of the season, but he was determined that Aberdeen should receive a transfer fee, therefore agreed to a £2 million transfer to Coventry City of the English Premier League in February 1996. He left Aberdeen for the first time having made 253 official appearances for the club, scoring 63 goals, and the transfer fee they received for him was a record amount.

=== Coventry City ===
25-year-old Jess made his Coventry debut against Middlesbrough on 24 February 1996 and made 12 league appearances in the latter part of that season under manager Ron Atkinson, scoring what would prove to be his only league goal for the club against QPR. In 1996–97 he played 27 times in the league but only started 19 of those, and scored an own goal in a game against Manchester United. He scored twice in Coventry's run in the 1996–97 FA Cup, netting in the third round game against Woking, and again in the fourth round victory at Blackburn Rovers. By that time Gordon Strachan had taken over from Atkinson as manager, and in the close season he allowed Jess to leave as he could not guarantee his place in the team. Despite his stay at Highfield Road being fairly brief, he later described the experience as "fantastic" due to the excitement of the games fighting relegation.

=== Return to Aberdeen ===
In summer 1997 Jess returned to Aberdeen, rejoining Roy Aitken's side for a fee of £700,000. This spell at Pittodrie was shorter and less successful than his first, although he did manage a career-best total of 14 league goals in 1998–99 including on the opening day which was the first goal of the Scottish Premier League era. He also played in the 2000 Scottish League Cup final and 2000 Scottish Cup final, both of which ended in defeat.

Having been a regular starter since his return he played less frequently in his final season, 2000–01, under manager Ebbe Skovdahl. In December 2000 he stated publicly that he may not sign a new contract and suggested that Aberdeen's ambition did not match his own (unaware of the club's financial plight at the time), alienating him from the hierarchy; he soon departed for a second time upon the opening of the winter transfer window, having made a further 126 Aberdeen appearances (31 goals).

=== Later years in England ===
Jess returned to the Premier League at the age of 30 with Bradford City, initially on loan, and scored on his debut for the Bantams on 1 January 2001 against Leicester City. Bradford were relegated in last place but the loan move was a success (17 games, three goals), with the deal being made permanent in the summer when Jess's Aberdeen contract expired. In the 2001–02 First Division he made 45 league appearances and finished the season as top scorer with 14 goals (including a hat-trick in a home win over Watford), but financial problems meant he was released by Bradford in June 2002 following the collapse of ITV Digital.

He joined Nottingham Forest in August 2002 and in his first season steered Forest into the play-offs in 6th place. However they dropped to 14th the next year and were relegated in 2005, and Jess moved on as a free agent.

In July 2005 he signed for Northampton Town and in his first season with the club achieved promotion from the fourth tier; in April 2007 he was released from his contract with The Cobblers, aged 36, and retired from playing.

== International career ==
Having represented the Under-21 side, Jess helped the team reach the semi-finals of UEFA under-21 Euros in 1992, and the Toulon Tournament in 1991.

After declining an approach from Northern Ireland (his father's birthplace), Jess made his debut for Scotland in November 1992 against Italy. He went on to earn 18 full caps. As an intermittent member of the main squad, he also appeared twice for the B team in 1994 and 1996.

Whilst at Coventry City he was selected for UEFA Euro 1996, and made one appearance during the tournament as a substitute in a 2–0 defeat to England. His two international goals were both scored while playing for Aberdeen, although four years apart: the first came against San Marino in 1995, and the second in a 2–1 UEFA Euro 2000 qualifier defeat at home to the Czech Republic in March 1999; he appeared from the bench in the return fixture three months later, which proved to be his final Scotland match.

== Coaching career ==
Jess later rejoined Nottingham Forest as a coach for their youth team from 2007 until he left the post in May 2012. He also spent time on the coaching staff at Peterborough United, joining in August 2012 to work under Darren Ferguson as a replacement for Mark Robson but departing less than a year later, replaced by Gary Breen.

== Personal life ==
In April 2009, at the age of 38, Jess suffered a mild stroke. During further tests it was discovered that a hole had been present in his heart all his life and in 2010 he underwent surgery to correct this.

In 2015 Jess was voted into Aberdeen's 'greatest ever team' by supporters of the club. In November 2018, he was one of four inductees into the Aberdeen Hall of Fame.

In 2016 he was living in Barcelona.

== Career statistics ==
=== Club ===
Appearances and goals by club, season and competition
Club	Season	League			National cup (Note: Includes Scottish Cup, FA Cup)		League cup (Note: Includes Scottish League Cup, Football League Cup)		Europe		Total	
Club	Season	Division	Apps	Goals	Apps	Goals	Apps	Goals	Apps	Goals	Apps	Goals
Aberdeen	1988–89	Scottish Premier Division	2	0	0	0	0	0	0	0	2	0
Aberdeen	1989–90	Scottish Premier Division	11	3	1	0	3	0	1 (Note: Appearance(s) in UEFA Cup)	0	16	3
Aberdeen	1990–91	Scottish Premier Division	27	13	1	0	4	1	3 (Note: Appearances in European Cup Winners' Cup)	1	35	15
Aberdeen	1991–92	Scottish Premier Division	39	12	1	0	2	0	2	0	44	12
Aberdeen	1992–93	Scottish Premier Division	31	12	4	2	5	2	–		40	16
Aberdeen	1993–94	Scottish Premier Division	41	6	6	0	3	1	4	5	54	12
Aberdeen	1994–95	Scottish Premier Division	25	1	2	1	3	0	0	0	30	2
Aberdeen	1995–96	Scottish Premier Division	25	3	2	0	5	0	–		32	3
Aberdeen	Total		201	50	17	3	25	4	10	6	253	63
Coventry City	1995–96	Premier League	12	1	–		–		–		12	1
Coventry City	1996–97	Premier League	27	0	4	2	1	0	–		32	2
Coventry City	Total		39	1	4	2	1	0	–		44	3
Aberdeen	1997–98	Scottish Premier Division	35	9	1	0	3	1	–		39	10
Aberdeen	1998–99	Scottish Premier League	36	14	1	0	2	0	–		39	14
Aberdeen	1999–2000	Scottish Premier League	26	5	4	1	4	0	–		34	6
Aberdeen	2000–01	Scottish Premier League	14	1	0	0	0	0	1	0	15	1
Aberdeen	Total		111	29	6	1	9	1	1	0	127	31
Bradford City (loan)	2000–01	Premier League	17	3	1	0	–		–		18	3
Bradford City	2001–02	First Division	45	14	1	0	2	0	–		48	14
Bradford City	Total		62	17	2	0	2	0	–		66	17
Nottingham Forest	2002–03	First Division	32	3	0	0	1	0	–		33	3
Nottingham Forest	2003–04	First Division	34	2	0	0	2	0	–		36	2
Nottingham Forest	2004–05	Championship	20	2	0	0	4	0	–		24	2
Nottingham Forest	Total		86	7	0	0	7	0	–		93	7
Northampton Town	2005–06	League Two	12	0	4	0	2	0	–		18	0
Northampton Town	2006–07	League One	26	1	3	0	1	0	–		30	1
Northampton Town	Total		38	1	7	0	3	0	–		48	1
Career total			537	105	36	6	47	5	11	6	631	122

=== International ===
Appearances and goals by national team and year
National team	Year	Apps	Goals
Scotland	1992	1	0
Scotland	1993	3	0
Scotland	1994	4	0
Scotland	1995	2	1
Scotland	1996	3	0
Scotland	1997	—	
Scotland	1998	1	0
Scotland	1999	4	1
Total		18	2

Scores and results list Scotland's goal tally first, score column indicates score after each Jess goal

List of international goals scored by Eoin Jess
No.	Date	Venue	Opponent	Score	Result	Competition
1	5 November 1995	Hampden Park, Glasgow, Scotland	San Marino	1–0	5–0	UEFA Euro 1996 Qualifying
2	31 March 1999	Celtic Park, Glasgow, Scotland	Czech Republic	1-2	1-2	UEFA Euro 2000 Qualifying
