= 2003–04 Hibernian F.C. season =

Hibernian
2003–04 season
- Chairman: Ken Lewandowski
- Manager: Bobby Williamson (until 20 April 2004)
- SPL: 8th
- Scottish Cup: R3
- CIS Cup: Final
- Top goalscorer: League: Riordan, 15; All: Riordan, 18
- Highest home attendance: 15060
- Lowest home attendance: 5447
- Average home league attendance: 9150 (down 787)

Season 2003–04 was a disappointment for Hibernian, as the team again finished in the bottom half of the Scottish Premier League, and was knocked out at the first stage of the Scottish Cup. The main highlight of the season was the run to the 2004 Scottish League Cup Final, which Hibs reached by defeating both halves of the Old Firm. This also ended in disappointment, however, as the Final was lost 2–0 to Livingston. A month after that defeat, manager Bobby Williamson was allowed to leave the club to manage Plymouth Argyle.

== League season ==
With the Hibs squad "stretched to its limits" by injuries to Ian Murray, Grant Brebner, Stephen Glass and Yannick Zambernardi, Hibs again struggled in the league. Financial problems meant that the club had sold or released many of its senior players during Bobby Williamson's time in charge, and even Williamson's own long-term contract was renegotiated to a shorter term and lower salary. The Hibs board were also apparently willing to allow Plymouth Argyle to take Williamson when made an approach in April 2004. Williamson's assistants, Gerry McCabe and Jim Clark, took charge of the team for the remainder of the season, with Tony Mowbray appointed soon after its conclusion.

=== Results ===
9 August 2003 SPL	Dundee United	1–2	Hibernian	Tannadice Park, Dundee
	Samuel 46'		Riordan 74'; McManus 88' (pen.)	Attendance: 9,809; Referee: Clark

17 August 2003 SPL	Hibernian	1–0	Heart of Midlothian	Easter Road, Edinburgh
	O'Connor 90'			Attendance: 14,803; Referee: Dougal

23 August 2003 SPL	Rangers	5–2	Hibernian	Ibrox Stadium, Glasgow
	Mols 34', 62'; Murray 43' (o.g.); Arteta 67'; Burke 84'		Murray 29'; McManus 36'	Attendance: 49,642; Referee: McDonald

30 August 2003 SPL	Hibernian	1–1	Aberdeen	Easter Road, Edinburgh
	Brown 69'		Anderson 6'	Attendance: 10,682; Referee: Brines

13 September 2003 SPL	Hibernian	0–2	Motherwell	Easter Road, Edinburgh
			Clarkson 45', 75'	Attendance: 8,387; Referee: Clark

20 September 2003 SPL	Dunfermline Athletic	0–0	Hibernian	East End Park, Dunfermline
				Attendance: 9,715; Referee: McCurry

27 September 2003 SPL	Hibernian	1–2	Celtic	Easter Road, Edinburgh
	Doumbe 38'		Thompson 40' (pen.); Larsson 51'	Attendance: 12,032; Referee: Freeland

4 October 2003 SPL	Partick Thistle	0–1	Hibernian	Firhill Stadium, Glasgow
			Brebner 90'	Attendance: 4,125; Referee: Rowbotham

18 October 2003 SPL	Hibernian	0–2	Livingston	Easter Road, Edinburgh
			Lilley 38', 83'	Attendance: 8,562; Referee: Thomson

25 October 2003 SPL	Hibernian	3–1	Kilmarnock	Easter Road, Edinburgh
	Murdock 13'; Riordan 16'; O'Connor 90'		Nish 80'	Attendance: 7,191; Referee: Underhill

1 November 2003 SPL	Dundee	1–1	Hibernian	Dens Park, Dundee
	Novo 33'		Riordan 81'	Attendance: 7,032; Referee: Clark

8 November 2003 SPL	Hibernian	2–2	Dundee United	Easter Road, Edinburgh
	Brown 15'; McCracken 90' (o.g.)		McLaren 28'; Robson 83'	Attendance: 8,756; Referee: Richmond

23 November 2003 SPL	Heart of Midlothian	2–0	Hibernian	Tynecastle, Edinburgh
	Orman 9' (o.g.); Smith 67' (o.g.)			Attendance: 16,632; Referee: Dallas

30 November 2003 SPL	Hibernian	0–1	Rangers	Easter Road, Edinburgh
			Hughes 90'	Attendance: 11,160; Referee: Dougal

7 December 2003 SPL	Aberdeen	3–1	Hibernian	Pittodrie Stadium, Aberdeen
	Hinds 26'; Booth 85', 90' (pen.)		Dobbie 57'	Attendance: 7,863; Referee: Clark

13 December 2003 SPL	Motherwell	0–1	Hibernian	Fir Park, Motherwell
			Riordan 90'	Attendance: 4,533; Referee: Thomson

21 December 2003 SPL	Hibernian	1–2	Dunfermline Athletic	Easter Road, Edinburgh
	Riordan 63'		Brewster 1', 36'	Attendance: 9,085; Referee: Fyfe

27 December 2003 SPL	Celtic	6–0	Hibernian	Celtic Park, Glasgow
	Sutton 4', 54' (pen.); Hartson 45', 60'; Larsson 66'; Petrov 77'			Attendance: 59,609; Referee: Freeland

3 January 2004 SPL	Hibernian	3–2	Partick Thistle	Easter Road, Edinburgh
	O'Connor 9'; Dobbie 35'; Whittaker 84'		Grady 53'; Madaschi 78'	Attendance: 8,875; Referee: Brines

17 January 2004 SPL	Livingston	1–0	Hibernian	Almondvale, Livingston
	Makel 26'			Attendance: 5,621; Referee: Underhill

24 January 2004 SPL	Kilmarnock	0–2	Hibernian	Rugby Park, Kilmarnock
			Brown 48'; O'Connor 50'	Attendance: 5,571; Referee: Dallas

31 January 2004 SPL	Hibernian	1–1	Dundee	Easter Road, Edinburgh
	Riordan 69' (pen.)		Fotheringham 44'	Attendance: 8,023; Referee: Conroy

10 February 2004 SPL	Dundee United	0–0	Hibernian	Tannadice Park, Dundee
				Attendance: 6,389; Referee: Thomson

15 February 2004 SPL	Hibernian	1–1	Heart of Midlothian	Easter Road, Edinburgh
	Riordan 24'		Pressley 47' (pen.)	Attendance: 15,060; Referee: McCurry

21 February 2004 SPL	Rangers	3–0	Hibernian	Ibrox Stadium, Glasgow
	Arveladze 9' (pen.); Mols 66'; Thompson 83' (pen.)			Attendance: 49,698; Referee: Dallas

28 February 2004 SPL	Hibernian	0–1	Aberdeen	Easter Road, Edinburgh
			Morrison 5'	Attendance: 10,416; Referee: Brines

21 March 2004 SPL	Hibernian	0–4	Celtic	Easter Road, Edinburgh
			Agathe 18', 81'; Larsson 35', 49'	Attendance: 9,456; Referee: McDonald

24 March 2004 SPL	Hibernian	3–3	Motherwell	Easter Road, Edinburgh
	Nicol 6'; Reid 37'; Riordan 62' (pen.)		Lasley 46'; Adams 60' (pen.); Doumbe 80' (o.g.)	Attendance: 5,670; Referee: Freeland

27 March 2004 SPL	Partick Thistle	1–1	Hibernian	Firhill Stadium, Glasgow
	Thomson 70' (pen.)		Murdock 68'	Attendance: 3,155; Referee: Rowbotham

3 April 2004 SPL	Hibernian	3–1	Livingston	Easter Road, Edinburgh
	McManus 39'; Riordan 54', 83'		Lilley 50'	Attendance: 6,507; Referee: Dallas

10 April 2004 SPL	Hibernian	3–0	Kilmarnock	Easter Road, Edinburgh
	Caldwell 22'; Thomson 45'; Riordan 64' (pen.)			Attendance: 7,326; Referee: Toner

13 April 2004 SPL	Dunfermline Athletic	1–1	Hibernian	East End Park, Dunfermline
	Dempsey 78'		Riordan 5'	Attendance: 5,041; Referee: Thomson

17 April 2004 SPL	Dundee	2–2	Hibernian	Dens Park, Dundee
	Lovell 38'; Milne 90'		Riordan 45'; Riordan 50' (pen.)	Attendance: 5,508; Referee: McDonald

24 April 2004 SPL	Kilmarnock	2–0	Hibernian	Rugby Park, Kilmarnock
	Boyd 28', 85'			Attendance: 4,886; Referee: Clark

1 May 2004 SPL	Hibernian	1–0	Dundee	Easter Road, Edinburgh
	Riordan 42'			Attendance: 6,180; Referee: Mackay

5 May 2004 SPL	Hibernian	1–2	Partick Thistle	Easter Road, Edinburgh
	Murdock 33'		Grady 38'; Murdock 60' (o.g.)	Attendance: 5,447; Referee: Thomson

8 May 2004 SPL	Aberdeen	0–1	Hibernian	Pittodrie Stadium, Aberdeen
			O'Connor 90'	Attendance: 6,781; Referee: Clark

15 May 2004 SPL	Livingston	4–1	Hibernian	Almondvale, Livingston
	Lovell 8'; Lilley 64'; Fernandez 78'; Makel 89'		Doumbe 75'	Attendance: 4,409; Referee: McCurry

=== Final table ===
Pos	Team	Pld	W	D	L	GF	GA	GD	Pts	Qualification or relegation (Note: Teams played each other three times (33 matches), before the league split into two groups (the top six and the bottom six) for the last five matches.)
6	Motherwell	38	12	10	16	42	49	−7	46	
7	Dundee	38	12	10	16	48	57	−9	46	
8	Hibernian	38	11	11	16	41	60	−19	44	Qualification for the UEFA Intertoto Cup second round (Note: Hibernian qualified for the 2004 UEFA Intertoto Cup as the highest placed team to apply to participate in the competition.)
9	Livingston	38	10	13	15	48	57	−9	43	
10	Kilmarnock	38	12	6	20	51	74	−23	42	

Source: Scottish Professional Football League
Rules for classification: 1) Points; 2) Goal difference; 3) Goals scored

== Scottish League Cup ==
As one of the SPL clubs who had not automatically qualified for European competition, Hibs entered at the last 32 stage (second round) of the competition, in which they defeated Montrose 9–0 at Easter Road. Hibs were then given another home draw in the last 16, against Queen of the South, which Hibs won 2–1. In the quarter-final, Hibs were again drawn to play at home, but this time had to face league leaders Celtic. Despite falling behind early in the second half, Hibs won 2–1 thanks to a late goal by Kevin Thomson. Hibs were then given another tough draw for the semi-final, playing the other half of the Old Firm, Rangers. Nonetheless, Hibs won the tie 4–3 on penalties, with Frank de Boer's miss sending Hibs through. These two upset victories sent Hibs to the Final, where they met Livingston. Hibs sold a remarkable 37,000 tickets for the game, suggesting that the club still had the drawing power to be a major force in Scottish football. The match ended in major disappointment, however, as Livingston won 2–0 to lift the trophy.

=== Results ===
23 September 2003 Scottish League Cup	Hibernian	9–0	Montrose	Easter Road, Edinburgh
	Dobbie 1', 29', 31' (pen.); O'Connor 18', 85'; Murray 66'; Kerrigan 70' (o.g.); Riordan 78'; Brown 86'			Attendance: 5,032; Referee: Toner

28 October 2003 Scottish League Cup	Hibernian	2–1	Queen of the South	Easter Road, Edinburgh
	Riordan 11', 23'		Burke 90' (pen.)	Attendance: 7,613; Referee: McCurry

18 December 2003 Scottish League Cup	Hibernian	2–1	Celtic	Easter Road, Edinburgh
	Brebner 64' (pen.); Thomson 82'		Varga 56'	Attendance: 9,246; Referee: Rowbotham

5 February 2004 Scottish League Cup	Hibernian	1–1 AET (4 – 3 pen.)	Rangers	Hampden Park, Glasgow
	Dobbie 79'		Mols 40'	Attendance: 27,954; Referee: Clark

14 March 2004 Scottish League Cup	Hibernian	0–2	Livingston	Hampden Park, Glasgow
			Lilley 50'; McAllister 52'	Attendance: 45,500; Referee: Young

== Scottish Cup ==
=== Results ===
10 January 2004 Scottish Cup	Hibernian	0–2	Rangers	Easter Road, Edinburgh
			Arveladze 35'; Løvenkrands 49'	Attendance: 11,392; Referee: McCurry

== Transfers ==
=== Players in ===
Player	From	Fee
(Scotland) Stephen Dobbie	Rangers	Free
(England) Roland Edge	Gillingham	Free
(Scotland) Stephen Glass	Watford	Free
(Denmark) Morten Hyldgaard	Coventry City	Free
(Northern Ireland) Colin Murdock	Preston North End	Free
(Scotland) Gary Caldwell	Newcastle United	Free

=== Players out ===
Player	To	Fee
(France) Frederic Arpinon	Nîmes Olympique	Free
(England) Derek Townsley	Oxford United	Free
(Scotland) David Proctor	Inverness CT	Free
(Scotland) Darran Thomson	Inverness CT	Free
(Scotland) Calvin Shand	Cowdenbeath	Free
(Finland) Mixu Paatelainen	St Johnstone	Free
(Scotland) Ryan Harding	Livingston	Free
(Scotland) Paul Hilland	Berwick Rangers	Free
(Scotland) John O'Neil	Falkirk	Free
(Denmark) Morten Hyldgaard	Luton Town	Free

=== Loans out ===
Player	To
(Republic of Ireland) Nick Colgan	Stockport County
(Scotland) Alistair Brown	Cowdenbeath

== Player stats ==
During the 2003–04 season, Hibs used 27 different players in competitive games. The table below shows the number of appearances and goals scored by each player. Goalkeeper Daniel Andersson was the only player to appear in every match, playing in 38 SPL matches, five League Cup ties and the one Scottish Cup tie.

No.	Pos	Nat	Player	Total		SPL		Scottish Cup		League Cup	
No.	Pos	Nat	Player	Apps	Goals	Apps	Goals	Apps	Goals	Apps	Goals
	GK	(Sweden) SWE	Daniel Andersson	44	0	38	0	1	0	5	0
	DF	(Scotland) SCO	Jonathan Baillie	3	0	2	0	0	0	1	0
	DF	(Scotland) SCO	Gary Caldwell	19	1	17	1	0	0	2	0
	DF	(France) FRA	Mathias Kouo-Doumbé	39	2	33	2	1	0	5	0
	DF	(England) ENG	Roland Edge	24	0	20	0	0	0	4	0
	DF	(Scotland) SCO	John Kane	1	0	1	0	0	0	0	0
	DF	(Northern Ireland) NIR	Colin Murdock	37	3	32	3	1	0	4	0
	DF	(Scotland) SCO	Jay Shields	1	0	1	0	0	0	0	0
	DF	(Scotland) SCO	Gary Smith	23	0	20	0	1	0	2	0
	DF	(Scotland) SCO	Steven Whittaker	33	1	28	1	1	0	4	0
	DF	(France) FRA	Yannick Zambernardi	8	0	8	0	0	0	0	0
	MF	(Scotland) SCO	Grant Brebner	26	2	22	1	1	0	3	1
	MF	(Scotland) SCO	Scott Brown	41	4	36	3	1	0	4	1
	MF	(Scotland) SCO	Stephen Glass	14	0	12	0	0	0	2	0
	MF	(Scotland) SCO	Jamie McCluskey	1	0	1	0	0	0	0	0
	MF	(England) ENG	Kevin McDonald	1	0	1	0	0	0	0	0
	MF	(Scotland) SCO	Ian Murray	16	2	14	1	0	0	2	1
	MF	(Scotland) SCO	Kevin Nicol	16	1	15	1	1	0	0	0
	MF	(Austria) AUT	Alen Orman	20	0	18	0	0	0	2	0
	MF	(Scotland) SCO	Alan Reid	23	1	20	1	0	0	3	0
	MF	(Scotland) SCO	Kevin Thomson	27	2	23	1	1	0	3	1
	MF	(Finland) FIN	Jarkko Wiss	14	0	13	0	0	0	1	0
	FW	(Scotland) SCO	Stephen Dobbie	33	6	28	2	1	0	4	4
	FW	(Scotland) SCO	Steven Fletcher	5	0	5	0	0	0	0	0
	FW	(Scotland) SCO	Tam McManus	37	3	32	3	0	0	5	0
	FW	(Scotland) SCO	Garry O'Connor	39	7	33	5	1	0	5	2
	FW	(Scotland) SCO	Derek Riordan	40	18	34	15	1	0	5	3

== See also ==
- List of Hibernian F.C. seasons
