= Michael Watt (footballer) =

Scottish footballer

Personal information
- Full name: Michael George Watt
- Date of birth: 27 November 1970 (age 55)
- Place of birth: Aberdeen, Scotland
- Position: Goalkeeper

Youth career
- Cove Rangers

Senior career*
Years	Team	Apps	(Gls)
1988–1998	Aberdeen	80	(0)
1997	→ Blackburn Rovers (loan)	0	(0)
1998–1999	Norwich City	9	(0)
1999	Kilmarnock	4	(0)
Total		93	(0)

International career
1990–1992	Scotland Under-21	13	(0)
1996	Scotland B	1	(0)
- * Club domestic league appearances and goals

Michael George Watt (born 27 November 1970 in Aberdeen) is a former professional footballer. He was a goalkeeper who played for Aberdeen, Norwich City and Kilmarnock.

Watt began his career with Aberdeen, where he was capped 13 times by Scotland under-21s. He was released by the club in 1998, subsequently signing a contract with Norwich City that would see him stay at Carrow Road until the end of the season. When his contract expired in the summer of 1999, he returned to Scotland to play for Kilmarnock, leaving in December 1999.

Following his departure from football, Watt has been working as a financial adviser in Glasgow.

== Career statistics ==
Appearances and goals by club, season and competition
Club	Season	League			National Cup		League Cup		Europe		Total	
Club	Season	Division	Apps	Goals	Apps	Goals	Apps	Goals	Apps	Goals	Apps	Goals
Aberdeen	1989–90	Scottish Premier Division	7	0	1	0	0	0	0	0	8	0
Aberdeen	1990–91	Scottish Premier Division	11	0	0	0	0	0	2	0	13	0
Aberdeen	1991–92	Scottish Premier Division	2	0	0	0	0	0	0	0	2	0
Aberdeen	1992–93	Scottish Premier Division	3	0	0	0	0	0	0	0	3	0
Aberdeen	1993–94	Scottish Premier Division	4	0	0	0	0	0	0	0	4	0
Aberdeen	1994–95	Scottish Premier Division	14	0	0	0	1	0	0	0	15	0
Aberdeen	1995–96	Scottish Premier Division	30	0	4	0	3	0	0	0	37	0
Aberdeen	1996–97	Scottish Premier Division	9	0	2	0	1	0	2	0	14	0
Aberdeen	1997–98	Scottish Premier Division	0	0	0	0	0	0	0	0	0	0
Aberdeen	Total		80	0	7	0	5	0	4	0	96	0
Blackburn Rovers (loan)	1997–98	Premier League	0	0	0	0	0	0	0	0	0	0
Norwich City	1998–99	First Division	9	0	1	0	0	0	–	–	10	0
Kilmarnock	1999–2000	SPL	4	0	0	0	0	0	0	0	4	0
Career total			93	0	8	0	5	0	4	0	110	0

== Honours ==
Aberdeen

- Scottish League Cup: 1

1995–96
