= Gary Smith (footballer, born 1971) =

Scottish footballer

Personal information
- Date of birth: 25 March 1971 (age 55)
- Place of birth: Glasgow, Scotland
- Position: Defender

Senior career*
Years	Team	Apps	(Gls)
1989–1991	Falkirk	70	(0)
1991–1996	Aberdeen	143	(1)
1996–1997	Rennes	14	(0)
1997–2000	Aberdeen	67	(1)
2000–2006	Hibernian	159	(1)
2006–2007	Cowdenbeath	10	(0)
2006–2007	→ Dundee (loan)	21	(1)
Total		484	(4)
- * Club domestic league appearances and goals

Gary Smith (born 25 March 1971) is a Scottish former professional footballer who played as a defender.

== Career ==
=== Club career ===
Smith was born in Glasgow, Scotland. He began his professional career at Falkirk, making his debut in 1989. He was snapped up by Aberdeen in 1991 and played in three cup finals for the Dons. He scored an own goal in the 1992 Scottish League Cup Final, which ultimately led to Rangers winning the trophy.

In 1996, he left for French club Rennes (Heart of Midlothian winger Allan Johnston making the same move), before returning to Aberdeen in 1997. He signed for Hibernian in 2000 and despite falling out of favour with manager Franck Sauzée, re-established himself as a regular in the team under Bobby Williamson. After a solid spell at Hibs, Smith was allowed to leave Easter Road for Cowdenbeath in 2006. He was then loaned to Dundee from Cowdenbeath after he was passed over for the managerial position.

=== International career ===
Smith was called up to the senior Scotland squad by Andy Roxburgh in 1993 but was ultimately never capped at that level.

=== After football ===
After retirement Smith retrained as a firefighter. Moving through the ranks Smith now holds the rank of Watch Commander in the Scottish Fire and Rescue Service.

== Career statistics ==
Appearances and goals by club, season and competition
Club	Season	League			National Cup		League Cup		Europe		Total	
Club	Season	Division	Apps	Goals	Apps	Goals	Apps	Goals	Apps	Goals	Apps	Goals
Falkirk	1988–89	Scottish First Division	3	0	0	0	0	0	–	–	3	0
Falkirk	1989–90	Scottish First Division	36	0	1	0	0	0	–	–	37	0
Falkirk	1990–91	Scottish First Division	31	0	3	0	1	0	–	–	36	0
Falkirk	Total		70	0	4	0	1	0	-	-	75	0
Aberdeen	1991–92	Scottish Premier Division	16	1	0	0	0	0	0	0	16	1
Aberdeen	1992–93	Scottish Premier Division	40	0	5	0	5	0	0	0	50	0
Aberdeen	1993–94	Scottish Premier Division	21	0	5	0	3	0	3	0	32	0
Aberdeen	1994–95	Scottish Premier Division	33	0	2	0	2	0	0	0	37	0
Aberdeen	1995–96	Scottish Premier Division	33	0	4	0	4	0	0	0	41	0
Aberdeen	Total		143	1	16	0	14	0	3	0	176	1
Rennes	1996–97	Ligue 1	14	0	0	0	0	0	0	0	14	0
Aberdeen	1997–98	Scottish Premier Division	31	1	1	0	2	0	0	0	34	1
Aberdeen	1998–99	SPL	30	0	1	0	2	0	0	0	33	0
Aberdeen	1999-00	SPL	6	0	0	0	1	0	0	0	7	0
Aberdeen	Total		67	1	2	0	5	0	0	0	74	1
Hibernian	2000–01	SPL	37	0	5	0	2	0	0	0	44	0
Hibernian	2001–02	SPL	30	0	3	1	2	0	1	0	36	1
Hibernian	2002–03	SPL	32	0	3	0	2	0	0	0	37	0
Hibernian	2003–04	SPL	20	0	1	0	2	0	0	0	23	0
Hibernian	2004–05	SPL	20	1	4	0	1	0	1	0	26	1
Hibernian	2005–06	SPL	20	0	2	0	1	0	1	0	24	0
Hibernian	Total		159	1	18	1	10	0	3	0	190	2
Cowdenbeath	2006–07	Scottish Second Division	10	0	0	0	1	0	–	–	11	0
Dundee (loan)	2006–07	Scottish First Division	21	1	1	0	0	0	–	–	22	1
Career total			484	4	41	1	31	0	6	0	562	5

== Honours ==
Falkirk

- Scottish First Division: 1990–91

Aberdeen

- Scottish League Cup: 1995; runners-up 1992
- Scottish Cup: runners-up 1993

Hibernian

- Scottish Cup: runners-up 2001
- Scottish League Cup: runners-up 2004
