= John Inglis (footballer, born 1966) =

Scottish footballer

Personal information
- Full name: John Inglis
- Date of birth: 16 October 1966 (age 60)
- Place of birth: Edinburgh, Scotland
- Height: 1.86 m (6 ft 1 in)
- Position: Defender

Senior career*
Years	Team	Apps	(Gls)
1983–1986	East Fife	56	(1)
1986–1988	Brechin City	53	(4)
1988–1990	Meadowbank Thistle	50	(4)
1990–1994	St Johnstone	140	(2)
1994–1999	Aberdeen	98	(4)
1999–2000	Levski Sofia	28	(3)
2000	Aberdeen	0	(0)
2000–2001	Carlisle United	8	(0)
2001	→ Raith Rovers (loan)	12	(0)
2001–2002	Botev Plovdiv	3	(0)
Total		420	(15)
- * Club domestic league appearances and goals

John Inglis (born 16 October 1966) is a Scottish former professional footballer.

== Playing career ==
He began his career as a professional footballer in 1983. He played the majority of his career with Scottish Premier League clubs St Johnstone and Aberdeen. He won the Scottish League Cup with the latter in 1996. He moved to Levski Sofia, becoming the first Scot to play in the A PFG, and then winning the League and Cup double in 1999–2000.

== Post-playing career ==
Following his retirement, Inglis remained in Bulgaria and became an agent. He took his football agents license in Bulgaria and holds an agents license 0032 with the Bulgarian BFU.

== Personal life ==
Inglis is married to Bulgarian model, Katia, whom he met during his spell playing with Levski Sofia.

== Career statistics ==
Appearances and goals by club, season and competition
Club	Season	League			Scottish Cup		League Cup		Europe		Total	
Club	Season	Division	Apps	Goals	Apps	Goals	Apps	Goals	Apps	Goals	Apps	Goals
Aberdeen	1994-95	Scottish Premier Division	18	1	2	0	0	0	0	0	20	1
Aberdeen	1995-96	Scottish Premier Division	24	1	1	0	5	1	0	0	30	2
Aberdeen	1996-97	Scottish Premier Division	14	0	2	0	3	0	4	0	23	0
Aberdeen	1997-98	Scottish Premier Division	25	1	1	0	2	0	0	0	28	1
Aberdeen	1998-99	SPL	17	1	1	0	2	0	0	0	20	1
Aberdeen	Total		98	4	7	0	12	1	4	0	121	5

== Honours ==
Aberdeen

- Scottish League Cup: 1995–96

Levski Sofia

- Bulgarian League: 1999–2000
- Bulgarian Cup: 1999–2000
