= David Rowson =

Scottish footballer

Personal information
- Full name: David Andrew Rowson
- Date of birth: 14 September 1976 (age 50)
- Place of birth: Aberdeen, Scotland
- Position: Midfielder

Senior career*
Years	Team	Apps	(Gls)
1994–2001	Aberdeen	133	(10)
2000	→ Livingston (loan)	6	(1)
2001–2003	Stoke City	13	(0)
2003–2004	Partick Thistle	48	(2)
2004–2006	Northampton Town	68	(2)
2006–2007	Darlington	24	(2)
2007	→ Boston United (loan)	6	(0)
2007–2013	Partick Thistle	162	(5)
2013–2014	Stenhousemuir	44	(2)
Total		504	(24)

International career
1996–1997	Scotland U21	5	(0)
- * Club domestic league appearances and goals

David Andrew Rowson (born 14 September 1976) is a Scottish former professional footballer who played as a midfielder.

== Career ==
Rowson started his professional career at his hometown club Aberdeen. He returned from a loan spell at Livingston halfway through the 1999–2000 season where he was sent to recuperate from a knee injury. During the last ten games of the league campaign, he did enough to merit his place in the side to play Rangers in the 2000 Scottish Cup final, ahead of fans favourite Hicham Zerouali.

In 2001, he earned a move to Stoke City. However, injuries blighted his time there, limiting him to only 18 appearances and consequently, he returned north of the border to join Partick Thistle. After playing there for a season, he announced his desire to move to an English club in the summer, sparking a host of clubs bidding for his signature, and he joined League Two side Northampton Town on a two-year contract.

He impressed in his time at Sixfields, and despite injuries in the 2005–06 season, he was an important figure in Northampton's push for promotion. However, after the final game of the season, then manager Colin Calderwood decided to not offer Rowson a new contract. He then joined Darlington and later had a spell at Boston United, before rejoining Partick Thistle in July 2007.

Rowson won most of the Player of the Year Awards at Partick Thistle at the conclusion of the 2007–08 season, when he played every minute of all but two league matches. He scored his first goal upon his return to the Jags against Livingston on 28 February 2009, with a 25-yard pile driver, having had several similar chances since his return fail narrowly. He left Partick on 30 January 2013 after agreeing to terminate his contract at Firhill Stadium. He ended his career with Stenhousemuir.

== Career statistics ==
Appearances and goals by club, season and competition
Club	Season	League			National cup		League cup		Other		Total	
Club	Season	Division	Apps	Goals	Apps	Goals	Apps	Goals	Apps	Goals	Apps	Goals
Aberdeen	1995–96	Scottish Premier Division	9	0	0	0	0	0	0	0	9	0
Aberdeen	1996–97	Scottish Premier Division	34	2	2	0	2	0	5 (Note: Appearances in UEFA Cup)	1	43	3
Aberdeen	1997–98	Scottish Premier Division	29	5	0	0	4	0	—		33	5
Aberdeen	1998–99	Scottish Premier League	21	0	1	0	2	0	—		24	0
Aberdeen	1999–2000	Scottish Premier League	5	1	1	0	0	0	—		6	1
Aberdeen	2000–01	Scottish Premier League	35	2	3	1	1	0	2	0	41	3
Aberdeen	Total		133	10	7	1	9	0	7	1	156	12
Livingston (loan)	1999–2000	Scottish First Division	6	1	0	0	0	0	0	0	6	1
Stoke City	2001–02	Second Division	13	0	3	0	1	0	1 (Note: Appearances in Football League Trophy)	0	18	0
Partick Thistle	2002–03	Scottish Premier League	13	0	0	0	0	0	—		13	0
Partick Thistle	2003–04	Scottish Premier League	35	2	3	1	1	0	—		39	3
Partick Thistle	Total		48	2	3	1	1	0	—		52	3
Northampton Town	2004–05	League Two	38	2	3	0	0	0	2 (Note: One appearances in Football League Trophy and one appearance in League Two play-offs)	0	43	2
Northampton Town	2005–06	League Two	30	0	1	0	1	0	2	0	34	0
Northampton Town	Total		68	2	4	0	1	0	4	0	77	2
Darlington	2006–07	League Two	24	2	0	0	2	0	2	0	28	2
Boston United (loan)	2006–07	League Two	6	0	0	0	0	0	0	0	6	0
Partick Thistle	2007–08	Scottish First Division	34	0	6	0	3	0	1 (Note: Appearances in Scottish Challenge Cup)	0	44	0
Partick Thistle	2008–09	Scottish First Division	35	0	2	0	2	0	2	0	41	0
Partick Thistle	2009–10	Scottish First Division	35	1	1	0	2	0	2	1	40	2
Partick Thistle	2010–11	Scottish First Division	29	1	3	0	1	0	0	0	33	1
Partick Thistle	2011–12	Scottish First Division	29	3	0	0	0	0	1	1	31	4
Partick Thistle	Total		162	5	12	0	8	0	6	2	188	7
Stenhousemuir	2012–13	Scottish Second Division	18	1	0	0	0	0	0	0	18	1
Stenhousemuir	2013–14	Scottish League One	26	1	2	0	0	0	1	0	29	1
Stenhousemuir	Total		44	2	2	0	0	0	1	0	47	2
Career total			504	24	31	2	22	0	21	3	578	29
