= Stephen Glass (footballer) =

Scottish footballer (born 1976)

Personal information
- Date of birth: 23 May 1976 (age 50)
- Place of birth: Dundee, Scotland
- Positions: Midfielder; left winger

Youth career
- 1992–1994: Aberdeen

Senior career*
Years	Team	Apps	(Gls)
1994–1998	Aberdeen	108	(9)
1994–1995	→ Crombie Sports (loan)	27	(1)
1998–2001	Newcastle United	43	(7)
2001–2003	Watford	64	(4)
2003–2007	Hibernian	86	(3)
2007–2010	Dunfermline Athletic	69	(9)
2010–2011	Carolina RailHawks	17	(0)
Total		414	(33)

International career
1995–1997	Scotland U21	11	(3)
1996–2003	Scotland B	3	(0)
1998	Scotland	1	(0)

Managerial career
- 2012–2014: Shamrock Rovers (assistant)
- 2012: Shamrock Rovers (interim)
- 2019–2020: Atlanta United 2
- 2020: Atlanta United (interim)
- 2020–2021: Atlanta United 2
- 2021–2022: Aberdeen
- 2022–2024: Memphis 901
- * Club domestic league appearances and goals

Stephen Glass (born 23 May 1976) is a Scottish former professional footballer who was most recently the manager of Memphis 901 in the USL Championship.

A midfielder, Glass started his career at Aberdeen, with whom he won the 1995 Scottish League Cup. In 1998, he moved to England, transferring to Newcastle United of the Premier League. Shortly after joining Newcastle, Glass made an appearance for the Scotland national football team. He joined Watford in the First Division in 2001, before returning to Scotland in 2003 with Hibernian. He joined Dunfermline Athletic in 2007 and was released at the end of the 2009–10 season. Glass finished his playing career with American club Carolina RailHawks.

Glass worked as an assistant manager for Shamrock Rovers. He then had four years in the Atlanta United organisation, including a spell as interim head coach of their MLS team. Glass was appointed Aberdeen manager in March 2021, but was sacked after less than a year in that position.

== Playing career ==
=== Aberdeen ===
Glass started his career with Aberdeen where he was regarded as one of Scotland's brightest prospects. He broke through into the first team during a relegation struggle in the 1994–95 season, and scored goals in the final league fixture and in both legs of the subsequent playoff to maintain his club's top-division status. In Aberdeen's League Cup victory against Dundee in November 1995, he set up both goals in the Dons' 2–0 success. His performance earned him the man-of-the-match award (a mountain bike) as well as a winner's medal.

=== Newcastle United ===
Glass moved to English Premier League team Newcastle United in 1998, for a fee of £650,000. In his first season at St James' Park, Glass made 29 appearances in all competitions, but was hampered by an injury in February. He did however recover to make a substitute appearance in the 1999 FA Cup Final against Manchester United at Wembley.

Injury, particularly a serious knee problem, blighted his second season in the Premiership. By the time Glass had regained full fitness, manager Bobby Robson had decided that Glass was no more than a solid squad player. Glass played a bit-part role in Newcastle's following two campaigns, making only six league starts out of a possible seventy-six, although he did score the equaliser in a 1–1 home draw with Manchester United in December 2000. He left the club at the end of the 2000–01 season.

=== Watford ===
In the summer of 2001 Glass signed for Watford on a free transfer, as part of Gianluca Vialli's new-look side. He was one of the more successful Vialli signings, and one of the few to be kept on by his successor, Ray Lewington. However, due to financial constraints Glass had to be released when his contract ended in the summer of 2003. Ironically, after this announcement was made he scored a stunning free-kick in Watford's victory over Burnley in the FA Cup quarter-final.

=== Hibernian ===
Glass was released by Watford at the end of the 2002–03 season and then signed for Hibernian on a three-year contract. He came to Hibs at a time when the club were cutting their budget and several younger players were being introduced to the squad. Glass made his debut for Hibs in the 2–1 win over Dundee United in August 2003 and also featured in an Edinburgh derby win over Hearts the following week. Despite flashes of his expected pedigree, Glass' first season at Easter Road was also blighted by injury, causing him to miss the 2004 Scottish League Cup Final.

His second season in Edinburgh, however, proved much more successful and his performances under new boss Tony Mowbray helped the club gain a UEFA Cup place by finishing third in the SPL. Glass missed only two league games due to injury in 2004–05 and his presence helped hold together a Hibernian midfield which was weakened by lengthy injuries to star players Scott Brown, Kevin Thomson and Guillaume Beuzelin. Along with numerous goal assists, Glass also chipped in with two key goals in Hibernian's league campaign; the first was a volley which proved to be a winning goal against Aberdeen in December 2004, while his free-kick helped Hibs to a 2–1 over Dunfermline the following week.

Glass was forced to start the 2005–06 season on the bench for Hibs. Injury to left-back David Murphy in November, however, saw him drafted in as cover and his dependable performances won him his midfield berth back after the new year. Although injuries and inconsistency thwarted Hibs bid for both a top-three finish and a Scottish Cup final place, Glass nonetheless featured in Hibs' impressive wins over Rangers and Hearts in 2006. He accepted Tony Mowbray's offer of a two-year contract extension in April 2006. Glass was overlooked for the vacant Hibs captaincy in favour of Gary Caldwell and then Kevin Thomson in 2005 and 2006, perhaps because manager Mowbray no longer saw him to be certain of automatic first-team selection. When Mowbray was succeeded as Hibs manager by John Collins in October 2006, Glass fell further down the pecking order.

=== Dunfermline Athletic ===
Having made only two first-team starts for Hibs during the first half of the 2006–07 season, he was allowed to move to Dunfermline Athletic to gain more regular first team football. He joined the Pars on 25 January 2007 on loan until the end of the season. After impressing Pars then-manager Stephen Kenny, Glass signed a two-year contract with the Fife club. At the start of the 2008–09 season, Glass was made vice-captain to Scott Wilson by manager Jim McIntyre and was made captain for the 2009–10 season. Glass suffered a knee injury early in that season and was released by Dunfermline at the end of the season.

Glass then went on trial with SPL side St Mirren and came on as a substitute in their pre-season friendly with Dumbarton on 19 July 2010. St Mirren manager Danny Lennon confirmed soon afterwards, however, that he would not be following up his interest in Glass.

=== Carolina RailHawks ===
Glass was signed by Carolina RailHawks of the second division North American Soccer League on 7 March 2011. Soon afterwards, Glass injured a hip, which prompted him to retire from playing football.

=== International career ===
Having left Aberdeen for Newcastle, Glass returned to Pittodrie in October 1998, making his first and only appearance for his country's full side as a substitute in Scotland's 2–1 win over the Faroe Islands. He had already appeared for the under-21 and 'B' teams.

== Coaching career ==
=== Shamrock Rovers ===
On 13 January 2012, Glass joined Shamrock Rovers as assistant manager, working for his former Dunfermline boss Stephen Kenny. On 11 September 2012 he was put in temporary charge of Shamrock Rovers, following Kenny's dismissal as manager.

=== Atlanta United ===
After becoming an academy coach of Atlanta United FC in August 2018, Glass made the move to become the head coach of the club's USL Championship side Atlanta United 2 on 30 January 2019. On July 27, 2020, Glass was named interim coach of Atlanta United, replacing Frank de Boer, who had departed the club by mutual agreement a few days prior. Glass returned to his role at Atlanta United 2 after Gabriel Heinze was appointed the full-time coach of the club's first-team in January 2021.

=== Aberdeen ===
Glass was appointed Aberdeen manager in March 2021, succeeding Derek McInnes. He was sacked by Aberdeen in February 2022, following a Scottish Cup defeat at Motherwell. The team were in ninth place in the Premiership at the time of his departure.

=== Memphis 901 ===
On 22 November 2022, Glass was named head coach for USL Championship club Memphis 901. Glass remained manager of Memphis until the club folded on 13 November 2024.

== Career statistics ==
=== Club ===
Appearances and goals by club, season and competition
Club	Season	League			National Cup		League Cup		Europe		Other		Total	
Club	Season	Division	Apps	Goals	Apps	Goals	Apps	Goals	Apps	Goals	Apps	Goals	Apps	Goals
Aberdeen	1994–95	Scottish Premier Division	21	3	2	0	0	0	0	0	–	–	23	3
Aberdeen	1995–96	Scottish Premier Division	32	3	4	0	5	0	0	0	–	–	41	3
Aberdeen	1996–97	Scottish Premier Division	24	1	2	0	3	1	3	2	–	–	32	4
Aberdeen	1997–98	Scottish Premier Division	31	2	1	0	2	1	0	0	–	–	34	3
Aberdeen	Total		108	9	9	0	10	2	3	2	-	-	130	13
Crombie Sports (loan)	1994–95	–	27	1	–	–	–	–	–	–	–	–	27+	1+
Newcastle United	1998–99	Premier League	22	3	4	0	2	0	2	0	–	–	30	3
Newcastle United	1999–2000	Premier League	7	1	1	0	1	0	3	0	–	–	12	1
Newcastle United	2000–01	Premier League	14	3	2	0	0	0	0	0	–	–	16	3
Newcastle United	Total		43	7	7	0	3	0	5	0	-	-	58	7
Watford	2001–02	First Division	31	3	0	0	2	0	–	–	–	–	33	3
Watford	2002–03	First Division	33	1	2	1	1	0	–	–	–	–	36	2
Watford	Total		64	4	2	1	3	0	-	-	-	-	69	5
Hibernian	2003–04	SPL	12	0	0	0	2	0	0	0	–	–	14	0
Hibernian	2004–05	SPL	36	2	3	0	3	1	2	0	–	–	44	3
Hibernian	2005–06	SPL	28	1	4	0	1	0	1	0	–	–	34	1
Hibernian	2006–07	SPL	10	0	0	0	1	0	2	0	–	–	13	0
Hibernian	Total		86	3	7	0	7	1	5	0	-	-	105	4
Dunfermline Athletic	2006–07	SPL	11	3	0	0	0	0	0	0	–	–	11	3
Dunfermline Athletic	2007–08	Scottish First Division	31	4	1	0	1	0	2	0	4	2	39	6
Dunfermline Athletic	2008–09	Scottish First Division	26	2	4	0	3	0	–	–	0	0	33	2
Dunfermline Athletic	2009–10	Scottish First Division	1	0	0	0	1	0	–	–	1	0	3	0
Dunfermline Athletic	Total		69	9	5	0	5	0	2	0	5	2	86	11
Carolina RailHawks	2010	USSF Division 2	17	0	–	–	–	–	–	–	–	–	17+	0+
Carolina RailHawks	Total		17	0	-	-	-	-	-	-	-	-	17+	0+
Career total			414	33	30+	1+	28+	3+	15	2	5	2	492+	41+

=== International ===
Appearances and goals by national team and year
National team	Year	Apps	Goals
Scotland	1998	1	0
Total		1	0

== Managerial statistics ==
As of match played 2 November 2024

Managerial record by team and tenure
Team	Nat	From	To	Record								Ref
Team	Nat	From	To	G	W	D	L	GF	GA	GD	Win %	Ref
Shamrock Rovers (interim)	(Republic of Ireland)	11 September 2012	6 November 2012	8	4	0	4	18	12	+6	50.00	
Atlanta United 2	(United States)	30 January 2019	27 July 2020	38	9	9	20	48	85	−37	23.68	
Atlanta United FC (interim)	(United States)	27 July 2020	18 December 2020	19	5	4	10	20	25	−5	26.32	
Atlanta United 2	(United States)	18 December 2020	23 March 2021	0	0	0	0	0	0	+0	—	
Aberdeen	(Scotland)	12 April 2021	13 February 2022	41	14	7	20	52	56	−4	34.15	
Memphis 901	(United States)	22 November 2022	31 December 2024	75	31	20	24	118	102	+16	41.33	
Total				181	63	40	78	256	279	−23	34.81	—

== Honours ==
=== Player ===
Aberdeen

- Scottish League Cup: 1995–96

Newcastle United

- FA Cup runner-up: 1998–99

Individual

- 1995 Scottish League Cup Final Man of the Match
