= Iliyan Kiryakov =

Bulgarian footballer

Personal information
- Full name: Iliyan Ivanov Kiryakov
- Date of birth: 4 August 1967 (age 59)
- Place of birth: Lesicheri, Bulgaria
- Height: 1.65 m (5 ft 5 in)
- Positions: Full-back; centre-back

Youth career
- 1979–1986: Etar Veliko Tarnovo

Senior career*
Years	Team	Apps	(Gls)
1986–1991	Etar Veliko Tarnovo	148	(14)
1991–1993	Deportivo La Coruña	39	(3)
1993–1994	Mérida	16	(0)
1994	Etar Veliko Tarnovo	8	(3)
1994–1995	CSKA Sofia	18	(0)
1995–1996	Anorthosis	19	(8)
1996–2000	Aberdeen	72	(1)
2000	Airdrieonians	6	(0)
2001	Raith Rovers	17	(1)
2001–2002	Akademik Svishtov	12	(0)
2002–2003	Etar 1924	28	(5)
2004	Chumerna Elena	15	(2)
2004–2005	CSKA Lesicheri	31	(8)
2005–2006	Rositsa Polikraishte	24	(5)
2006–2007	Yantra 2002	17	(6)
Total		454	(54)

International career
1984–1986	Bulgaria U19	24	(8)
1986–1987	Bulgaria U21	37	(2)
1988–1996	Bulgaria	56	(0)

Managerial career
- 2016: Etar Veliko Tarnovo (interim)
- 2018: Etar Veliko Tarnovo
- 2025: Etar Veliko Tarnovo (interim)
- * Club domestic league appearances and goals

Iliyan Ivanov Kiryakov (Bulgarian: Илиян Иванов Киряков; born 4 August 1967) is a Bulgarian former professional footballer who played as a defender. A versatile player, he could be deployed as a full-back on either flank, or as a centre-back.

During a professional career which spanned nearly 20 years, he played for nine different clubs, including three in Scotland.

Kiryakov won 56 caps for Bulgaria and represented the nation at the 1994 FIFA World Cup and UEFA Euro 1996.

== Club career ==
Kiryakov was born in the small town of Lesicheri. In his country, he represented Etar Veliko Tarnovo and PFC CSKA Sofia. In 1991, he moved abroad, signing with Deportivo de La Coruña. In his first season, he was first-choice (only missed three La Liga matches) but the Galicians barely avoided relegation, as 17th; subsequently, as Super Depor came to fruition, he became a fringe player and left.

Kiryakov continued in Spain for 1993–94, playing in the Segunda División with CP Mérida. He then returned to his country for one more year, with PFC CSKA Sofia, signing in the 1995 summer with Cyprus club Anorthosis Famagusta FC.

Kiryakov spent the following five years in Scotland, playing for Aberdeen (scoring once against Dundee United), Airdrieonians (only five months) and Raith Rovers. He finished his career in June 2003 at nearly 36: after a brief spell with lowly Akademik Svishtov, he retired at Etar, his first club.

A year later he returned to play for the amateur club Chumerna Elena. Same year he joined his birth city club CSKA Lesicheri in the regional divisions, then moved to other regional club Rositsa Polikraishte, before retiring again in Yantra 2002.

== International career ==
During eight years, Kiryakov played 53 times for Bulgaria, scoring five goals.

He appeared in six matches in the 1994 FIFA World Cup (four complete) as the national side finished in fourth position, and was also picked for the squad at UEFA Euro 1996, where he played in the group stage 1–1 draw against Spain.

== Career statistics ==
Club	Season	League			Scottish Cup		League Cup		Europe		Total	
Club	Season	Division	Apps	Goals	Apps	Goals	Apps	Goals	Apps	Goals	Apps	Goals
Aberdeen	1996-97	SPL	27	1	2	0	3	0	6	0	38	1
Aberdeen	1997-98	SPL	15	0	1	0	0	0	0	0	16	0
Aberdeen	1998-99	SPL	22	0	1	0	2	0	0	0	25	0
Aberdeen	1999-00	SPL	8	0	0	0	1	0	0	0	9	0
Aberdeen	Total		72	1	4	0	6	0	6	0	88	1

== Honours ==
Etar Veliko Tarnovo

- A Group: 1990–91

Bulgaria

- FIFA World Cup fourth place: 1994
