= 1998–99 in Scottish football =

Premier League champions
- Rangers

First Division champions
- Hibernian

Second Division champions
- Livingston

Third Division champions
- Ross County

Scottish Cup winners
- Rangers

League Cup winners
- Rangers

Junior Cup winners
- Kilwinning Rangers

Teams in Europe
- Celtic, Heart of Midlothian, Kilmarnock, Rangers

Scotland national team
- Euro 2000 qualification
- ← 1997–98 1999–2000 →

The 1998–99 season was the 102nd season of Scottish league football.

== League competitions ==
=== Scottish Premier League ===
==== Summary ====
The 1998–99 SPL season was one that ended in success for Rangers. Dutchman Dick Advocaat was brought in to replace Walter Smith at Rangers and made major changes, bringing in many players.

Rangers were comfortable for most of the season, being top for most of it. Their main low of the season was a 5–1 defeat to Celtic at Parkhead. After beating Aberdeen 3–1 at Ibrox on 25 April, Rangers had a chance to clinch the title at Parkhead on 2 May. Rangers did what they wanted to do with a 3–0 victory. Two goals from Neil McCann and a Jorg Albertz penalty gave Rangers their 100th league victory over Celtic. The match was overshadowed by the controversy during and after the game. Three players were sent off and referee Hugh Dallas was hit by a coin thrown from the Celtic end.

Rangers were presented with the trophy the following week at home to Hearts. The match ended 0–0. Dunfermline Athletic were relegated to the First Division.

==== Table ====
Pos	Team	Pld	W	D	L	GF	GA	GD	Pts	Qualification or relegation
1	Rangers (C)	36	23	8	5	78	31	+47	77	Qualification for the Champions League second qualifying round
2	Celtic	36	21	8	7	84	35	+49	71	Qualification for the UEFA Cup qualifying round (Note: Since Rangers, the winners of the 1998–99 Scottish Cup, already qualified for the UEFA Champions League, Celtic, the losing finalist, earned a spot in the 1999–2000 UEFA Cup. As such, the league's UEFA Cup place moved down to third-placed St Johnstone. Scotland were also awarded an additional UEFA Cup place as the association was top of the UEFA Fair Play ranking. Kilmarnock earned this place as winners of the Scottish Fair Play ranking.)
3	St Johnstone	36	15	12	9	39	38	+1	57	Qualification for the UEFA Cup qualifying round
4	Kilmarnock	36	14	14	8	47	29	+18	56	Qualification for the UEFA Cup qualifying round
5	Dundee	36	13	7	16	36	56	−20	46	
6	Heart of Midlothian	36	11	9	16	44	50	−6	42	
7	Motherwell	36	10	11	15	35	54	−19	41	
8	Aberdeen	36	10	7	19	43	71	−28	37	
9	Dundee United	36	8	10	18	37	48	−11	34	
10	Dunfermline Athletic (R)	36	4	16	16	28	59	−31	28	Relegation to the 1999–2000 Scottish First Division

Updated to match(es) played on end of season. Source: Soccerway and SPL official website
Rules for classification: 1) Points; 2) Goal difference; 3) Goals scored
(C) Champions; (R) Relegated

=== Scottish First Division ===
Pos	Team	Pld	W	D	L	GF	GA	GD	Pts	Promotion or relegation
1	Hibernian (C, P)	36	28	5	3	84	33	+51	89	Promotion to the Premier League
2	Falkirk	36	20	6	10	60	38	+22	66	
3	Ayr United	36	19	5	12	66	42	+24	62	
4	Airdrieonians	36	18	5	13	42	43	−1	59	
5	St Mirren	36	14	10	12	42	43	−1	52	
6	Morton	36	14	7	15	45	41	+4	49	
7	Clydebank	36	11	13	12	36	38	−2	46	
8	Raith Rovers	36	8	11	17	37	57	−20	35	
9	Hamilton Academical (R)	36	6	10	20	30	62	−32	28	Relegation to the Second Division
10	Stranraer (R)	36	5	2	29	29	74	−45	17	Relegation to the Second Division

Source: "1998-1999 First Division - SPFL Archive". SPFL.
Rules for classification: 1) points; 2) goal difference; 3) number of goals scored.
(C) Champions; (P) Promoted; (R) Relegated

=== Scottish Second Division ===
Pos	Team	Pld	W	D	L	GF	GA	GD	Pts	Promotion or relegation
1	Livingston (C, P)	36	22	11	3	64	35	+29	77	Promotion to the First Division
2	Inverness CT (P)	36	21	9	6	80	48	+32	72	Promotion to the First Division
3	Clyde	36	15	8	13	46	42	+4	53	
4	Queen of the South	36	13	9	14	50	45	+5	48	
5	Alloa Athletic	36	13	7	16	65	56	+9	46	
6	Stirling Albion	36	12	8	16	50	63	−13	44	
7	Arbroath	36	12	8	16	37	52	−15	44	
8	Partick Thistle	36	12	7	17	36	45	−9	43	
9	East Fife (R)	36	12	6	18	42	64	−22	42	Relegation to the Third Division
10	Forfar Athletic (R)	36	8	7	21	48	68	−20	31	Relegation to the Third Division

Source: "1998-1999 Second Division - SPFL Archive". SPFL.
Rules for classification: 1) points; 2) goal difference; 3) number of goals scored.
(C) Champions; (P) Promoted; (R) Relegated

=== Scottish Third Division ===
Pos	Team	Pld	W	D	L	GF	GA	GD	Pts	Promotion
1	Ross County (C, P)	36	24	5	7	87	42	+45	77	Promotion to the Second Division
2	Stenhousemuir (P)	36	19	7	10	62	42	+20	64	Promotion to the Second Division
3	Brechin City	36	17	7	12	47	44	+3	58	
4	Dumbarton	36	16	9	11	53	40	+13	57	
5	Berwick Rangers	36	12	14	10	53	49	+4	50	
6	Queen's Park	36	11	11	14	41	46	−5	44	
7	Albion Rovers	36	12	8	16	43	63	−20	44	
8	East Stirlingshire	36	9	13	14	50	48	+2	40	
9	Cowdenbeath	36	9	6	21	35	65	−30	33	
10	Montrose	36	8	6	22	42	74	−32	30	

Source: "1998-1999 Third Division - SPFL Archive". SPFL.
Rules for classification: 1) points; 2) goal difference; 3) number of goals scored.
(C) Champions; (P) Promoted

== Other honours ==
=== Cup honours ===
The Scottish League Cup (CIS Insurance Cup) began in August and ended in November. Eventual winners Rangers defeated Alloa Athletic, Ayr United and Airdrieonians en route to the final which was held at Celtic Park. Rangers defeated SPL side St Johnstone 2–1 to give Dick Advocaat his first trophy as Rangers manager.

The (Tennents) Scottish Cup began in January and ended in May. Eventual winners Rangers defeated Stenhousemuir, Hamilton Academical, Falkirk and St Johnstone en route the final. At the new Hampden Park, Rangers met Old Firm rivals Celtic. A Rod Wallace goal clinched a domestic treble for Rangers in Dick Advocaat's first season as manager.

Competition	Winner	Score	Runner-up
Scottish Cup 1998–99	Rangers	1–0	Celtic
League Cup 1998–99	Rangers	2–1	St Johnstone
Youth Cup	Celtic	4–0	Dundee
Junior Cup	Kilwinning Rangers	1–0	Kelty Hearts
Challenge Cup	No competition		

=== Individual honours ===
==== SPFA awards ====
Award	Winner	Club
Players' Player of the Year	(Sweden) Henrik Larsson	Celtic
Young Player of the Year	(Scotland) Barry Ferguson	Rangers

==== SFWA awards ====
Award	Winner	Club
Footballer of the Year	(Sweden) Henrik Larsson	Celtic
Young Player of the Year	(Scotland) Barry Ferguson	Rangers
Manager of the Year	(Netherlands) Dick Advocaat	Rangers

== Scottish clubs in Europe ==
Club	Competition(s)	Final round	Coef.
Celtic	UEFA Champions League; UEFA Cup	Second qualifying round Second round	7.50
Heart of Midlothian	UEFA Cup Winners' Cup	First round	3.00
Rangers	UEFA Cup	Third round	10.50
Kilmarnock	UEFA Cup	Second qualifying round	1.50

Average coefficient – 5.625

== Scotland national team ==
Date	Venue	Opponents	Score	Competition	Scotland scorer(s)
5 September	Zalgirio Stadionas, Vilnius (A)	Lithuania	0–0	ECQG9	
10 October	Tyencastle Park, Edinburgh (A)	Estonia	3–2	ECQG9	Billy Dodds (2), Sergei Hohlov-Simson (o.g.)
14 October	Pittodrie, Aberdeen (H)	Faroe Islands	2–1	ECQG9	Billy Dodds, Craig Burley
31 March	Celtic Park, Glasgow (H)	Czech Republic	1–2	ECQG9	Eoin Jess
28 April	Weserstadion, Bremen (A)	Germany	1–0	Friendly	Don Hutchison
5 June	Svangaskarð, Toftir (A)	Faroe Islands	1–1	ECQG9	Allan Johnston
9 June	Sparta Stadion, Prague (A)	Czech Republic	2–3	ECQG9	Paul Ritchie, Allan Johnston

Key:

- (A) = Away match
- (H) = Home match
- WCQG6 = World Cup Qualifying – Group 6

== Notable events ==
- The Scottish Premier League was formed as a breakaway league from the Scottish Premier Division, in a similar fashion to how the leading Football League clubs in England broke away to form the FA Premier League in 1992.
- Rangers won the Scottish domestic treble in their first season under the management of Dick Advocaat.
- Following the resignation of manager Wim Jansen, Celtic appointed 62-year-old former Aston Villa and Czechoslovakia manager Jozef Venglos as his successor. However, the appointment was not a success as Celtic finished the season without a major trophy and Venglos departed to be succeeded by the new management team of director of football Kenny Dalglish and head coach John Barnes.
- Paul Sturrock departed St Johnstone at the start of the season to take over at Dundee United.
- New St Johnstone manager Sandy Clark guided St Johnstone to the club's best ever finish of third in the SPL, earning UEFA Cup qualification for only the second time. The Saints also reached the final of the League Cup and the semi-finals of the Scottish Cup.
- Four years after leaving Broomfield Park and ground-sharing with Clyde at Broadwood Stadium in Cumbernauld, Airdrieonians returned to their hometown to the new 10,000-seat Excelsior Stadium.
- Hibernian returned to the top flight at the first time of asking as Division One champions.
- 28-year-old Rangers defender Alan McLaren, who was capped 24 times for Scotland between 1992 and 1995, retired at the end of the season after two years out of action due to injury.
- Rod Wallace, who was part of the Leeds United team that won the English league title in 1992, joined Rangers at the start of the season and added the Scottish title and both domestic cups to his list of honours.
- After 11 years in England with Manchester United, veteran striker Brian McClair rejoined his old club Motherwell but played just 11 games for them before moving back south of the border in December to become assistant manager to former Manchester United coach Brian Kidd at Blackburn Rovers. Ironically, McClair was initially reported to be leaving Scotland for the Manchester United assistant manager's job left vacant by Kidd's move to Blackburn.
