= Scott Booth =

Scottish footballer (born 1971)

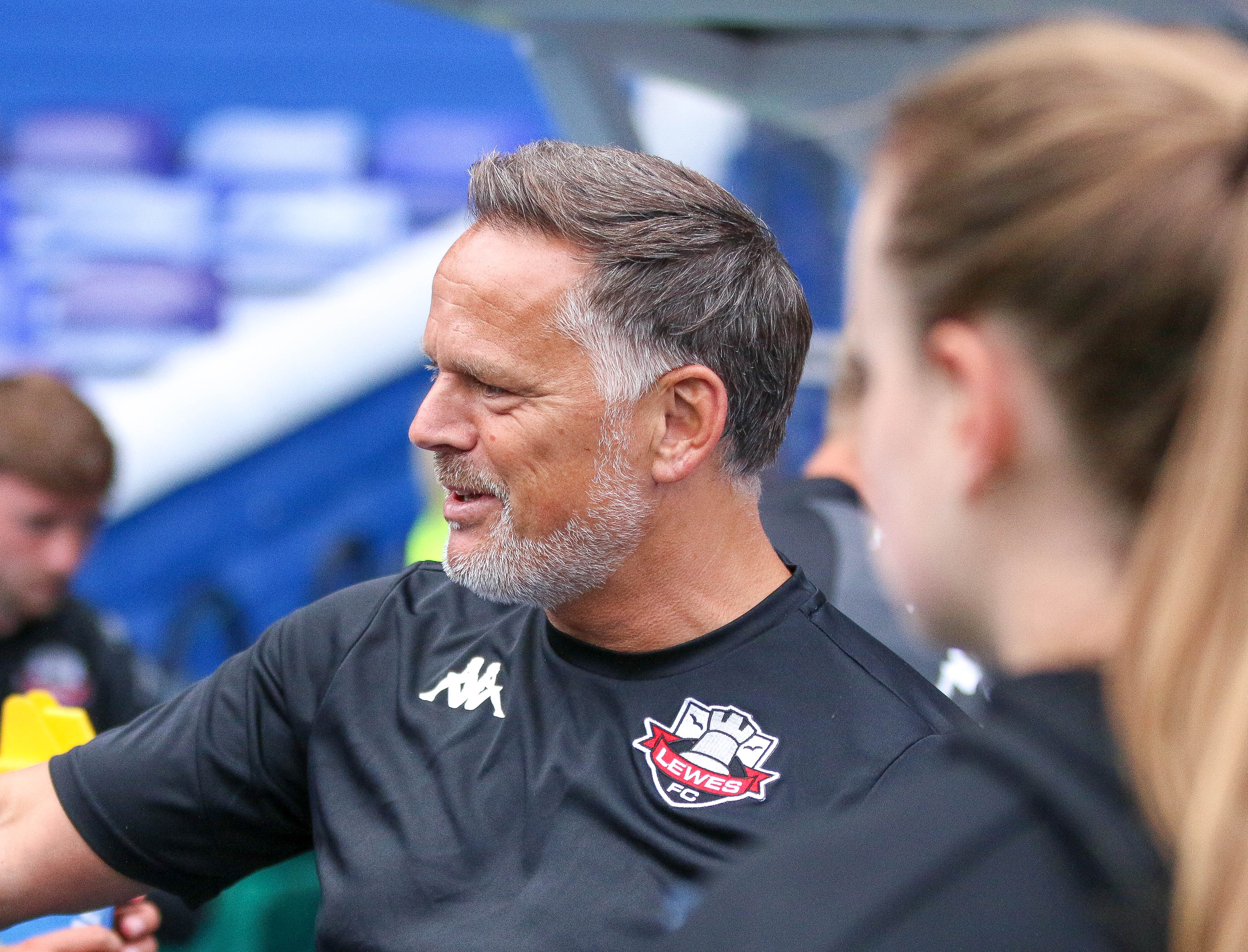
- Booth coaching Lewes Women in August 2022

Personal information
- Date of birth: 16 December 1971 (age 54)
- Place of birth: Aberdeen, Scotland
- Height: 1.78 m (5 ft 10 in)
- Position: Striker

Youth career
- 1987–1988: Deeside Boys Club
- 1988–1990: Aberdeen

Senior career*
Years	Team	Apps	(Gls)
1990–1997	Aberdeen	163	(43)
1997–1999	Borussia Dortmund	10	(1)
1998	→ Utrecht (loan)	14	(5)
1999	→ Vitesse Arnhem (loan)	18	(4)
1999–2003	Twente	103	(21)
2003–2004	Aberdeen	21	(8)
Total		329	(82)

International career
1990–1993	Scotland U21	15	(8)
1993–2001	Scotland	22	(6)
1994–1996	Scotland B	2	(0)

Managerial career
- 2014–2015: Stenhousemuir
- 2015–2021: Glasgow City
- 2021: Birmingham City Women
- 2022–2024: Lewes Women
- 2024–: Aberdeen Women
- * Club domestic league appearances and goals

Scott Booth (born 16 December 1971) is a Scottish football coach and former player, who is the head coach of Aberdeen Women in the Scottish Women's Premier League 1.

A forward by position, he began his playing career at Aberdeen as a teenager, before moving to Germany in 1997 to play for Borussia Dortmund. After a spell in the Netherlands with FC Twente (as well as loans from Dortmund to FC Utrecht and Vitesse Arnhem), he returned to Aberdeen in 2003, retiring a year later due to injury.

After his retirement as a player Booth became a coach, working with the Scotland youth teams. After a year as manager of Stenhousemuir he moved into women's football, becoming manager of Glasgow City. Booth left this position in June 2021 to become manager of FA WSL club Birmingham City, but was sacked five months later. He was appointed by Lewes in May 2022.

== Club career ==
=== Aberdeen ===
Born in Aberdeen, Booth started his career at his hometown club Aberdeen, making his debut in 1990 aged 18 and emerging into the team alongside fellow youth graduate Eoin Jess.

Booth was part of the Aberdeen side that came close to winning the League title on the final day of the Scottish Premier League in the 1990–91 season, and achieved further league runners-up finishes in 1993 and 1994, plus losing finals in the 1992–93 League Cup and Scottish Cup. He played in every game of the club's Scottish League Cup campaign in 1995 until an injury ruled him out of the final, in which Aberdeen defeated Dundee 2–0.

=== Germany, Netherlands and return ===
In summer 1997, Booth left Pittodrie for a surprise move to Borussia Dortmund in Germany under the Bosman ruling. The success of fellow Scot Paul Lambert was perhaps one of the reasons behind the move; nevertheless, he never really got an extended run with the then-European champions after the coach who brought him in – Ottmar Hitzfeld – moved to another role at the club, although he got a brief taste of Champions League football alongside the likes of Andreas Möller and Matthias Sammer, scoring against Sparta Prague. He is also notable for being the first Scot to win the Intercontinental Cup (albeit as an unused substitute in the match against Cruzeiro).

Booth moved on loan to Dutch club FC Utrecht in 1998, seeking more playing time to secure his place in the Scotland squad for the 1998 FIFA World Cup. A year later he moved to another Eredivisie side, Vitesse Arnhem, again on loan, and contributed to a strong season where the club only missed out on Champions League qualification by a goal difference of two.

He thereafter left Borussia Dortmund permanently, returning to the Netherlands to sign with FC Twente for a fee equivalent to £400,000. He played there for four years and picked up a winner's medal when Twente won the KNVB Cup in 2001 after a penalty shoot-out (in which he scored) in the final. In the following season he had to fight for his place, and was close to returning to Scotland to play under former manager Alex Smith; he also made his last appearances in continental competition in the 2001–02 UEFA Cup.

Booth rejoined Aberdeen in the summer of 2003. He was the club's top scorer in the 2003–04 season, but was hit by injury. He retired from playing at the end of his contract in 2004, aged 32. Over his two spells he made 229 appearances in all competitions for Aberdeen, scoring 70 goals.

== International career ==
Booth won 22 caps for Scotland, scoring six goals, and was a member of Scotland's Euro 1996 and 1998 World Cup squads. He had previously played for the Under-21 team, and set a goalscoring record for the team.

== Commentator ==
After retiring from football, Booth began a career in broadcasting. He worked as a match co-commentator and pundit for Setanta Sports until its UK broadcasting operation went into administration. He has also worked for STV, BBC Radio Scotland and ESPN. Booth scaled back these commitments when he was appointed as a national youth team coach by the Scottish Football Association.

== Coaching career ==
Having gained a UEFA Pro Licence, Booth was appointed by the Scottish Football Association as Scotland under-15 and under-16 assistant manager in December 2011, working under Mark Wotte.

He was appointed manager of Scottish League One club Stenhousemuir in February 2014. On 1 February 2015 he was relieved of his duties with the club sitting just above the relegation positions in League One.

=== Glasgow City ===
Booth was appointed head coach of Scottish Women's Premier League club Glasgow City in July 2015, taking over from Eddie Wolecki Black.

The club won the (summer seasonal) League Championship in 2015, 2016 and 2017 — taking their run of consecutive titles to 11 — and also lifted the Scottish Women's Cup in November 2015 to clinch a fourth treble in a row, although defeats to main challengers Hibernian in the two cup finals of both 2016 and 2017 brought the treble sequences to an end.

Glasgow City won the SWPL again in 2018, but they did not win either domestic cup and were heavily beaten by FC Barcelona Femení in the Champions League; media observers suggested Booth may have reached the limit of what he could achieve at the club, with little hope of making an impact in Europe given the superior resources of the fully professional clubs from the leading nations, and any interruption to dominance in Scotland being viewed as failure.

In the 2019–20 UEFA Women's Champions League Booth led Glasgow City to the quarter-final, their joint-best finish in Europe, before they succumbed to a heavy 9–1 defeat to eventual finalists Wolfsburg.

Booth left Glasgow City in June 2021, having won six consecutive league championships with the club.

=== England ===
Booth became the manager of Women's Super League club Birmingham City in June 2021. He was sacked in November 2021 after five months in charge of Birmingham.

In May 2022, he was appointed as head coach of Women's Championship side Lewes.

=== Return to Aberdeen ===
On 24 October 2024, Booth was appointed head coach of Aberdeen Women in the SWPL, leaving a post as assistant to Leanne Ross at Glasgow City he had taken up three months earlier. He replaced Colin Bell at Aberdeen, while Leanne Crichton was appointed to the Glasgow City role a week later.

== Career statistics ==
=== Club ===
Appearances and goals by club, season and competition
Club	Season	League			National Cup		League Cup		Europe		Total	
Club	Season	Division	Apps	Goals	Apps	Goals	Apps	Goals	Apps	Goals	Apps	Goals
Aberdeen	1989–90	Scottish Premier Division	2	0	0	0	0	0	0	0	0	0
Aberdeen	1990–91	Scottish Premier Division	19	6	1	0	1	0	1	0	22	6
Aberdeen	1991–92	Scottish Premier Division	33	5	1	0	2	1	2	0	38	6
Aberdeen	1992–93	Scottish Premier Division	29	13	6	6	1	0	0	0	36	19
Aberdeen	1993–94	Scottish Premier Division	25	4	5	1	3	2	1	0	34	7
Aberdeen	1994–95	Scottish Premier Division	12	6	0	0	4	3	2	0	18	9
Aberdeen	1995–96	Scottish Premier Division	24	9	2	0	4	3	0	0	30	12
Aberdeen	1996–97	Scottish Premier Division	19	0	2	1	0	0	2	0	23	1
Aberdeen	Total		163	43	17	8	15	9	8	0	203	60
Borussia Dortmund	1997–98	Bundesliga	10	1	0	0	0	0	3	1	13	2
Borussia Dortmund	1998–99	Bundesliga	0	0	0	0	0	0	0	0	0	0
Borussia Dortmund	Total		10	1	0	0	0	0	3	1	13	2
FC Utrecht (loan)	1997–98	Eredivisie	14	5	-	-	-	-	-	-	14+	5+
Vitesse Arnhem (loan)	1998–99	Eredivisie	18	4	-	-	-	-	-	-	18+	4+
FC Twente	1999–2000	Eredivisie	31	8	-	-	-	-	-	-	31+	8+
FC Twente	2000–01	Eredivisie	23	7	-	-	-	-	-	-	23+	7+
FC Twente	2001–02	Eredivisie	27	4	-	-	-	-	-	-	27+	4+
FC Twente	2002–03	Eredivisie	22	2	-	-	-	-	-	-	22+	2+
FC Twente	Total		103	21	-	-	-	-	-	-	103+	21+
Aberdeen	2003–04	SPL	21	8	3	1	2	1	0	0	26	10
Career total			329	82	20+	9+	17+	10+	11+	1+	377+	102+

=== International ===
Appearances and goals by national team and year
National team	Year	Apps	Goals
Scotland	1993	5	1
Scotland	1994	2	2
Scotland	1995	2	2
Scotland	1996	4	0
Scotland	1997	—	
Scotland	1998	5	0
Scotland	1999	—	
Scotland	2000	—	
Scotland	2001	4	1
Total		22	6

Scores and results list Scotland's goal tally first, score column indicates score after each Booth goal.

List of international goals scored by Scott Booth
No.	Date	Venue	Opponent	Score	Result	Competition
1	19 May 1993	Kadrioru Stadium, Tallinn, Estonia	Estonia	3–0	3–0	1994 FIFA World Cup qualification
2	12 October 1994	Hampden Park, Glasgow	Faroe Islands	2–0	5–1	UEFA Euro 1996 qualifying
3	16 November 1994	Hampden Park, Glasgow, Scotland	Russia	1–0	1–1	Euro 1996 qualifying
4	6 September 1995	Hampden Park, Glasgow, Scotland	Finland	1–0	1–0	Euro 1996 qualifying
5	15 November 1995	Hampden Park, Glasgow, Scotland	San Marino	2–0	5–0	Euro 1996 qualifying
6	25 April 2001	Zdzisław Krzyszkowiak Stadium, Bydgoszcz, Poland	Poland	1–1	1–1	Friendly

=== Managerial record ===
As of 5 November 2018 (end of 2018 season)

Team	Nat	From	To	Record				
Team	Nat	From	To	G	W	D	L	Win %
Stenhousemuir	(Scotland)	February 2014	February 2015	40	12	9	19	30.00
Glasgow City	(Scotland)	July 2015	June 2021	114	93	5	16	81.58
Total				154	105	14	35	68.18

== Honours ==
=== Player ===
Aberdeen

- Scottish League Cup: 1995–96, runner-up 1992–93
- Scottish Premier Division: runner-up 1990–91, 1992–93, 1993–94
- Scottish Cup: runner-up 1992–93

Borussia Dortmund

- Intercontinental Cup: 1997

FC Twente

- KNVB Cup: 2000–01

Scotland U21

- UEFA under-21 Euros: Bronze 1992
- Toulon Tournament: Bronze 1991

=== Coach ===
Scotland Youth

- Victory Shield: 2013–14

Glasgow City

- Scottish Women's Premier League: 2015, 2016, 2017, 2018, 2019
- Scottish Women's Cup: 2015
