= Michael Craig (footballer, born 1977) =

Scottish footballer

Personal information
- Date of birth: 20 September 1977 (age 49)
- Place of birth: Glasgow, Scotland
- Position: Striker

Youth career
- East End

Senior career*
Years	Team	Apps	(Gls)
1995–1998	Aberdeen	40	(1)
1998–2000	Montrose	34	(6)
- Huntly

International career
1997	Scotland U21	2	(0)
- * Club domestic league appearances and goals

Michael Craig (born 20 September 1977) is a Scottish former professional footballer, who played for Aberdeen and Montrose in the Scottish Football League.
