= Malcolm Kpedekpo =

Scottish footballer and investment banker (born 1976)

Personal information
- Full name: Malcolm Aguedze Kofi Kpedekpo
- Date of birth: 27 August 1976 (age 50)
- Place of birth: Aberdeen, Scotland
- Height: 6 ft 0 in (1.83 m)
- Position: Centre forward

Senior career*
Years	Team	Apps	(Gls)
–	Hermes		
1994–1999	Aberdeen	11	(0)
- * Club domestic league appearances and goals

Malcolm Aguedze Kofi Kpedekpo (born 27 August 1976) is an investment banker and former footballer. Playing for Aberdeen as a schoolboy and later while at university, Kpedekpo left football to move to Australia working for KPMG. He returned to Scotland to work for the Bank of Scotland before starting investment firm Panoramic Growth Equity.

== Life and career ==
Kpedekpo was born in Aberdeen on 27 August 1976. He joined Aberdeen FC aged 16, and he made his first team debut at 18. He made eleven league appearances in total plus one in the UEFA Cup, without scoring. While playing football, Kpedekpo completed of a university degree in management and accounting.

Finding himself frustrated by his lack of first-team football, Kpedekpo was offered the opportunity to go on loan to another club, but instead chose to leave football and followed up an offer given to him by KPMG at a university awards dinner. Moving to Australia on secondment, Kpedekpo stayed there for five years before moving back to his native Scotland to work for the Bank of Scotland.

Kpedekpo started investment firm Panoramic Growth Equity with some colleagues from the Bank of Scotland. The firm secured £21.7 million from the UK Government's Enterprise Capital Fund, the first Scottish-based company to benefit from that scheme. In June 2010 the firm held a first close of its debut fund at £34 million, the only SME growth fund to close in the United Kingdom in 2010 until then.

Kpedekpo was appointed as a non-executive director of the Scottish Football Association in April 2019.
