= Jamie Buchan =

Footballer (born 1977)

Personal information
- Full name: Martin James Buchan
- Date of birth: 3 April 1977 (age 49)
- Place of birth: Manchester, England
- Position: Midfielder

Senior career*
Years	Team	Apps	(Gls)
1995–2000	Aberdeen	64	(3)
1995–1996	→ Stonehaven (loan)		
2000–2002	Dundee United	42	(1)
2002–2003	Partick Thistle	28	(1)
2004–2008	Peterhead	107	(13)
2008–2009	Montrose	14	(0)
2009–2010	Cove Rangers		

International career
1997–1999	Scotland U21	13	(0)
- * Club domestic league appearances and goals

Martin James Buchan (born 3 April 1977) is a former professional footballer who played as a midfielder for Aberdeen, Dundee United, Partick Thistle, Montrose, Peterhead and Cove Rangers. Born in England, he represented the Scotland U21 national team. He is the son of former Manchester United and Scotland player Martin Buchan.

== Early life ==
Buchan was the fourth member of his family to play senior football, following his grandfather Martin (Aberdeen and Dundee United), his father Martin (Aberdeen, Manchester United and Scotland) and his uncle George (Aberdeen and Manchester United). He was born in Manchester during his father's playing career there.

== Club career ==
Buchan started his career with Aberdeen, from whom he spent a short spell on loan at Stonehaven prior to making his first team debut. He spent five years with Aberdeen before joining Dundee United on a free transfer in 2000. After two seasons, Buchan moved to Partick Thistle in 2002. A period out of football followed due to red tape before his move to Peterhead in 2004. He left Peterhead for Montrose in January 2008. Buchan joined Highland League club Cove Rangers in 2009.

== International career ==
Although born in England, Buchan was qualified to represent Scotland by being of Scottish parentage. He made thirteen appearances for the Scotland under-21 national team between 1997 and 1999.
