= Ian Donald (footballer) =

Scottish footballer (born 1951)

Personal information
- Full name: Ian Richard Donald
- Date of birth: 28 November 1951 (age 74)
- Place of birth: Aberdeen, Scotland
- Position: Full back

Youth career
- 1968–1969: Manchester United

Senior career*
Years	Team	Apps	(Gls)
1969–1973	Manchester United	4	(0)
1973	Partick Thistle	1	(0)
1973–1975	Arbroath	4	(0)
- * Club domestic league appearances and goals

Ian Richard Donald (born 28 November 1951) is a Scottish former footballer who played as a full back for Manchester United, Partick Thistle and Arbroath in the 1970s. He later took up a position on the Aberdeen board of directors, before eventually becoming chairman in 1994.

== Career ==
Born in Aberdeen, Donald was a promising Scotland schoolboy international when he was picked up by Manchester United as a 16-year-old in 1968. He turned professional a year later, and made his United debut on 7 October 1970, when he played at right back in the club's 1–0 victory over Portsmouth in the League Cup Third Round. However, it was nearly two years before Donald made another appearance for United, returning to action in the club's 3–0 victory at home to Derby County on 23 September 1972. It looked like Donald was on the verge of an extended run in the first team under Frank O'Farrell, but when O'Farrell was replaced by Tommy Docherty in December 1972, he suddenly found himself out of favour. He transferred to Partick Thistle in January 1973.

Donald was not with Partick for long, however, only making one appearance for the club before the end of the 1972–73 season, when he was transferred to Arbroath. In two seasons with Arbroath, though, Donald only managed four league appearances and he retired from playing at the end of the 1974–75 season.

In 1980, Donald was appointed to the board of directors at Aberdeen, before rising to the position of vice-chairman by 1986, and then becoming chairman in 1994. He left the post in 1998, and remained on the board until 2004, when he was appointed as the club's honorary president.
