= Billy Dodds =

Scottish footballer (born 1969)

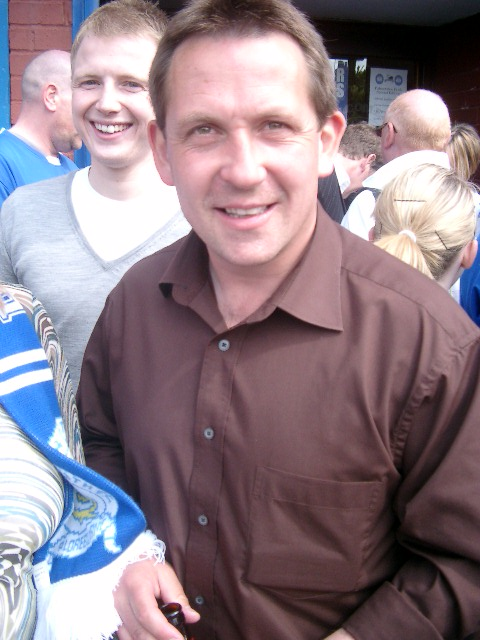
- Dodds in 2008

Personal information
- Full name: William Dodds
- Date of birth: 5 February 1969 (age 57)
- Place of birth: New Cumnock, Scotland
- Height: 5 ft 7 in (1.70 m)
- Position: Striker

Youth career
- Chelsea

Senior career*
Years	Team	Apps	(Gls)
1986–1989	Chelsea	3	(0)
1987	→ Partick Thistle (loan)	30	(9)
1989–1994	Dundee	174	(68)
1994	St Johnstone	20	(6)
1994–1998	Aberdeen	140	(49)
1998–1999	Dundee United	45	(25)
1999–2003	Rangers	65	(21)
2003–2006	Dundee United	68	(14)
2006	Partick Thistle	2	(0)
Total		547	(192)

International career
1996–2001	Scotland	26	(7)

Managerial career
- 2006: Dundee United (caretaker)
- 2021–2023: Inverness Caledonian Thistle
- * Club domestic league appearances and goals

William Dodds (born 5 February 1969) is a Scottish former football coach and player.

His playing career started with English club Chelsea and the rest of his career was spent in Scotland with Partick Thistle, Dundee, St Johnstone, Aberdeen, Dundee United and Rangers. Dodds made 26 appearances for Scotland, scoring seven goals.

He has had coaching spells at Queen of the South, Dundee, Ross County and Inverness Caledonian Thistle. After a spell as their assistant manager, Inverness appointed Dodds as their manager in 2021. He guided them to the 2023 Scottish Cup final, but was sacked later that year.

== Club career ==
=== Early career ===
Born in New Cumnock, Dodds began his career with English club Chelsea in 1986. He made his senior debut on loan to Partick Thistle in 1987–88. After making only three appearances for Chelsea, he was transferred to Dundee in 1989. He scored 68 league goals in 174 appearances for Dundee, winning a Scottish First Division title in the 1991–92 season and scoring a hat-trick in the 1990 Scottish Challenge Cup Final.

=== St Johnstone ===
Dodds moved to St Johnstone, for a club record £400,000 transfer fee in January 1994 but moved to Aberdeen within six months.

=== Aberdeen ===
Dodds was Aberdeen's record signing at £800,000. During his time at Pittodrie, he scored important goals to prevent relegation in 1994–95 and was part of the side that won the 1995–96 Scottish League Cup, scoring as The Dons beat his former club Dundee in the November 1995 final having also netted both goals in the semi-final victory the previous month. Dodds remained at Aberdeen until September 1998, when manager Alex Miller used him – along with £700,000 – in a swap deal to bring Robbie Winters to Pittodrie Stadium from Dundee United.

=== Dundee United ===
Dodds enjoyed something of a rebirth when Aberdeen offered him and cash for Winters. Restored to playing as a striker, Dodds' full debut for United saw a hat-trick against former club St Johnstone. During his time at Tannadice, he scored 25 goals in 45 league appearances.

=== Rangers ===
In December 1999, less than fifteen months after joining United, 30-year-old Dodds was signed for Rangers (the club he supported in childhood) by manager Dick Advocaat for £1.3m, following injuries to forwards Michael Mols and Jonatan Johansson. Dodds proved an instant success at Ibrox, scoring goals domestically and in European competition. Dodds was part of the squad that won a League and Scottish Cup double in 2000, and a cup double in 2002. He has described his time with Rangers as "the pinnacle of my career". First-team opportunities dried up later in his stay, leading to his departure in January 2003.

=== Final playing spell ===
With few first team opportunities under new Rangers manager Alex McLeish, Dodds returned to Dundee United in January 2003 as he was swapped for Steven Thompson. On Dodds' second debut for United, he scored the first equaliser in a 2–2 draw at home to Kilmarnock.

During 2005, Dodds signed a new contract at Dundee United that would see him work with manager Gordon Chisholm as both player and first team coach. Now playing more in midfield or as a sweeper as his pace began to slow, Dodds helped United avoid relegation that year. When Chisholm was sacked as manager in January 2006, Dodds took over as caretaker manager for one match, a 2–1 win against Falkirk in the Premier League. When Craig Brewster took over as manager the following week, Dodds left the club. He then signed for Second Division club Partick Thistle as a player later that month, but left after making three appearances.

== International career ==
Dodds gained his first Scotland cap on 5 October 1996 against Latvia while playing for Aberdeen, coming on as a 59th-minute substitute in the 1998 FIFA World Cup Qualifier win in Riga. He was in the starting line-up for the following fixture against Estonia in Tallinn four days later, but a scheduling dispute meant the home team did not adhere to a quickly-rearranged afternoon kick-off time, and the match was abandoned at kick-off with no caps awarded to the Scotland players; the fixture was re-arranged for the following February, but Dodds was not selected.

His form at Dundee United attracted the attentions of Scotland coach Craig Brown, who restored Dodds to the Scotland squad after a twelve-month absence. During his time with United, he featured in ten competitive international matches, including the UEFA Euro 2000 play-off matches against England, scoring four times during the qualifying, with his first two goals for Scotland coming against Estonia at Tynecastle Park, and a long-range winning goal away to Bosnia and Herzegovina.

He continued to be selected whilst at Rangers, with his 26th and final cap coming in September 2001 against Belgium, a match which Scotland lost 2-0 meaning they would not qualify for the 2002 FIFA World Cup. He scored three times in the group taking his goals total to seven, all in competitive matches.

== Coaching career ==
=== Assistant ===
Gordon Chisholm appointed Dodds as strikers' coach at Queen of the South. Queens made it to the 2008 Scottish Cup Final, which they lost 3–2 to Rangers. This led to the club's first appearance in a UEFA organised competition, the 2008–09 UEFA Cup.

Chisholm selected Dodds to be his assistant manager when he was appointed manager of Dundee in March 2010. In October 2010, as Dundee entered administration, Chisholm and Dodds were made redundant as the administrator Bryan Jackson set about the task of saving the club from liquidation. Dodds subsequently objected to the company voluntary arrangement (CVA) that took Dundee out of administration in 2011.

On 9 September 2014, Dodds become assistant manager to Jim McIntyre at Ross County. He left the club on 25 September 2017 when both he and McIntyre were sacked. When McIntyre was appointed Dundee manager in October 2018, Dodds was linked with the assistant position there. This move did not proceed as Dundee fans objected to Dodds due to his vote against the CVA, and Jimmy Boyle was appointed assistant instead.

=== Inverness Caledonian Thistle manager ===
Dodds joined Inverness Caledonian Thistle as an assistant to interim manager Neil McCann during the latter part of the 2020–21 season after John Robertson went on compassionate leave. At the end of that season Inverness appointed Dodds as their new head coach, with Robertson becoming their sporting director. In his first full season as manager, Dodds guided Inverness to the Premiership playoff final, but they lost 6–2 on aggregate to St Johnstone despite going on a 11 game winless streak between December and March. In his second season they reached the 2023 Scottish Cup final, which they lost 3–1 to Celtic although their final appearance only happened after fellow Championship side Queens Park fielded an ineligible player. Dodds and his assistant Barry Wilson were sacked on 17 September 2023, with the team bottom of the Championship at the time and have just one point from five league games and being knocked out of the Challenge Cup and the League Cup.

=== Rangers ===
On 24 February 2025, Dodds was appointed as an assistant manager at Scottish Premiership side Rangers. He worked under interim head coach and former Rangers teammate Barry Ferguson.

=== Kilmarnock ===
Dodds was appointed assistant manager of Kilmarnock on 6 January 2026, working with Neil McCann.

== Career statistics ==
=== Club ===
Appearances and goals by club, season and competition
Club	Season	League			National Cup		League Cup		Continental		Other		Total	
Club	Season	Division	Apps	Goals	Apps	Goals	Apps	Goals	Apps	Goals	Apps	Goals	Apps	Goals
Chelsea	1986–87	Football League First Division	1	0	0	0	0	0	0	0	1 (Note: Appearances in Full Members Cup)	0	2	0
Chelsea	1988–89	Football League First Division	2	0	0	0	0	0	0	0	1	0	3	0
Chelsea	Total		3	0	0	0	0	0	0	0	2	0	5	0
Partick Thistle (loan)	1987–88	Scottish First Division	30	9					0	0			30	9
Dundee	1989–90	Scottish Premier Division	30	13					0	0			30	13
Dundee	1990–91	Scottish First Division	37	15					0	0			37	15
Dundee	1991–92	Scottish First Division	42	19					0	0			42	19
Dundee	1992–93	Scottish Premier Division	41	16	0	0			0	0			41	16
Dundee	1993–94	Scottish Premier Division	24	5					0	0			24	5
Dundee	Total		174	68	0	0	0	0	0	0	0	0	174	68
St Johnstone	1993–94	Scottish Premier Division	20	6	0	0	0	0	0	0	0	0	20	6
Aberdeen	1994–95	Scottish Premier Division	35	15					0	0			35	15
Aberdeen	1995–96	Scottish Premier Division	31	7					0	0			31	7
Aberdeen	1996–97	Scottish Premier Division	31	14	2	1	2	4	0	0			35	19
Aberdeen	1997–98	Scottish Premier Division	34	10	1	0	3	2	0	0			38	12
Aberdeen	1998–99	Scottish Premier League	6	0	0	0	2	3	0	0			8	3
Aberdeen	Total		137	46	3	1	7	9	0	0	0	0	147	56
Dundee United	1998–99	Scottish Premier League	30	16	7	1	0	0	0	0			37	17
Dundee United	1999-00	Scottish Premier League	15	9	0	0	3	1	0	0			18	10
Dundee United	Total		45	25	7	1	3	1	0	0	0	0	55	27
Rangers	1999-00	Scottish Premier League	18	10	3	5	0	0	0	0	0	0	21	15
Rangers	2000–01	Scottish Premier League	30	9	1	0	2	1	8	3	0	0	41	13
Rangers	2001–02	Scottish Premier League	11	2	3	4	1	0	1	0	0	0	16	6
Rangers	2002–03	Scottish Premier League	6	0	0	0	0	0	0	0	0	0	6	0
Rangers	Total		65	21	7	9	3	1	9	3	0	0	84	34
Dundee United	2002–03	Scottish Premier League	14	2	1	0	1	0	0	0	0	0	16	2
Dundee United	2003–04	Scottish Premier League	33	10	1	0	1	0	0	0	0	0	35	10
Dundee United	2004–05	Scottish Premier League	21	2	0	0	4	0	0	0	0	0	25	2
Dundee United	Total		68	14	2	0	6	0	0	0	0	0	76	14
Partick Thistle	2005–06	Scottish Second Division	2	0	1	0	0	0	0	0	0	0	3	0
Career total			544	189	20	11	19	11	9	3	2	0	594	214

=== International ===
Appearances and goals by national team and year
National team	Year	Apps	Goals
Scotland	1996	1	0
Scotland	1997	3	0
Scotland	1998	2	3
Scotland	1999	9	1
Scotland	2000	6	0
Scotland	2001	5	3
Total		26	7

Scores and results list Scotland's goal tally first, score column indicates score after each Dodds goal.

List of international goals scored by Billy Dodds
No.	Date	Venue	Opponent	Score	Result	Competition
1	10 October 1998	Tynecastle Park, Edinburgh, Scotland	Estonia	1–1	3–2	UEFA Euro 2000 qualifying
2	10 October 1998	Tynecastle Park, Edinburgh, Scotland	Estonia	3–2	3–2	UEFA Euro 2000 qualifying
3	14 October 1998	Pittodrie Stadium, Aberdeen, Scotland	Faroe Islands	2–0	2–1	UEFA Euro 2000 qualifying
4	4 September 1999	Olimpijski Stadion, Sarajevo, Bosnia and Herzegovina	Bosnia and Herzegovina	2–1	2–1	UEFA Euro 2000 qualifying
5	24 March 2001	Hampden Park, Glasgow, Scotland	Belgium	1–0	2–2	2002 FIFA World Cup qualification
6	24 March 2001	Hampden Park, Glasgow, Scotland	Belgium	2–0	2–2	2002 FIFA World Cup qualification
7	28 March 2001	Hampden Park, Glasgow, Scotland	San Marino	3–0	4–0	2002 FIFA World Cup qualification

=== Managerial record ===
As of match played 16 September 2023

Managerial record by team and tenure
Team	Nat	From	To	Record								Ref
Team	Nat	From	To	G	W	D	L	GF	GA	GD	Win %	Ref
Dundee United (caretaker)	(Scotland)	10 January 2006	16 January 2006	1	1	0	0	2	1	+1	100.00	
Inverness Caledonian Thistle	(Scotland)	1 June 2021	17 September 2023	110	43	31	36	158	135	+23	39.09	
Career Total				111	44	31	36	159	136	+23	39.64	—

== Honours ==
=== Player ===
Dundee

- Scottish Challenge Cup: 1990–91
- Scottish First Division: 1991–92

Aberdeen

- Scottish League Cup: 1995–96

Rangers

- Scottish Premier League: 1999–2000
- Scottish Cup: 1999–2000
- Scottish League Cup: 2001–02

=== Manager ===
Inverness CT

- Scottish Cup: Runner-up: 2022–23

== See also ==
- List of footballers in Scotland by number of league appearances (500+)
