= 2002–03 Dundee United F.C. season =

Dundee United
2002–03 season
- Chairman: Jim McLean (until 26 September); Eddie Thompson (from 26 September)
- Manager: Alex Smith (until 7 October); Paul Hegarty (Interim) (until 30 January); Ian McCall (from 30 January)
- Stadium: Tannadice Park
- SPL: Eleventh place
- 2002–03 Scottish Cup: Third round
- League Cup: Semi-finals
- Top goalscorer: League: Jim McIntyre (9); All: Jim McIntyre & Steven Thompson (9)
- Highest home attendance: 12,402 vs. Dundee, SPL, 31 August 2002
- Lowest home attendance: 3,600 vs. Queen's Park, League Cup, 24 September 2002
| Home colours | Away colours | Third colours |

The 2002–03 season was the 94th year of football played by Dundee United, and covers the period from 1 July 2002 to 30 June 2003. United finished the season in eighth place.

== Summary ==
Dundee United played a total of 43 competitive matches during the 2002–03 season. The team finished eleventh in the Scottish Premier League.

In the cup competitions, United were knocked out of the Scottish Cup in the third round, losing at home to Hibernian. Celtic knocked United out of the League Cup in the semi-finals.

What had begun with optimism and hopes that United could continue the progress made the previous year would end up being statistically the club's worst season since before World War II. Eddie Thompson took over as chairman with the season barely a month old and quickly sacked Alex Smith, though a run of just two wins from the first ten games did not help the manager's cause. After a failed attempt to recruit Ian McCall, Paul Hegarty was put in charge provisionally until the end of the season. While the former club hero got off to a decent start with 7 points from five matches, a dismal run of ten weeks without a win followed, leading to Hegarty being dismissed at the end of January and McCall being successfully recruited.

The key factor in McCall's change of heart was that while his previous club Falkirk were runaway leaders of the First Division, it was by now evident that they were unlikely to be promoted as their ground did not meet the SPL's requirements. McCall still had the task of keeping United off the bottom of the table in the unlikely event that the SPL had a change of heart or one of the chasing pack overhauled Falkirk, and he ultimately managed this with an excellent run of form after the SPL split, leaving them to finish eleventh. However, this good finish could not mask what had been an extremely poor season by any measure, and left McCall facing a major reconstruction job.

Six players were signed during the 2002–03 season, with a total (public) transfer cost of around £150,000. Four players were also signed for the following season. In addition, two players were signed on loan. Eight players left the club during the season with only one transfer – Steven Thompson to Rangers – bringing in a fee of £200k. Two players were loaned out during the season with six also released before next season.

Mark Wilson would collect the Young player of the month award for November 2002.

The club's playing kits were sponsored by Telewest for the last time.

== Results and fixtures ==
All results are written with Dundee United's score first.

=== Scottish Premier League ===
| Date | Opponent | Venue | Result | Attendance | Scorers |
|---|---|---|---|---|---|
| 3 August 2002 | Partick Thistle | A | 0–0 | 6,375 | |
| 10 August 2002 | Kilmarnock | H | 1–2 | 6,366 | Thompson |
| 17 August 2002 | Celtic | A | 0–5 | 56,907 | |
| 25 August 2002 | Motherwell | H | 1–1 | 5,795 | McIntyre |
| 31 August 2002 | Dundee | H | 0–0 | 12,402 | |
| 11 September 2002 | Aberdeen | A | 2–1 | 10,724 | Thompson (2) |
| 14 September 2002 | Dunfermline Athletic | H | 1–2 | 6,041 | Lilley |
| 21 September 2002 | Heart of Midlothian | A | 0–2 | 11,532 | |
| 28 September 2002 | Rangers | H | 0–3 | 10,013 | |
| 5 October 2002 | Hibernian | A | 1–2 | 11,532 | Thompson |
| 19 October 2002 | Livingston | H | 2–3 | 5,572 | Lilley, McIntyre |
| 26 October 2002 | Partick Thistle | H | 1–1 | 6,369 | Thompson |
| 2 November 2002 | Kilmarnock | A | 2–1 | 5,417 | Thompson, McIntyre |
| 10 November 2002 | Celtic | H | 0–2 | 10,664 | |
| 16 November 2002 | Motherwell | A | 2–1 | 5,381 | Hamilton (2) |
| 23 November 2002 | Dundee | A | 2–3 | 11,539 | Hamilton, McIntyre |
| 30 November 2002 | Aberdeen | H | 1–1 | 8,621 | Hamilton |
| 4 December 2002 | Dunfermline Athletic | A | 1–4 | 4,342 | McIntyre |
| 7 December 2002 | Hibernian | H | 1–1 | 5,673 | Wilson |
| 14 December 2002 | Rangers | A | 0–3 | 47,639 | |
| 21 December 2002 | Heart of Midlothian | H | 0–3 | 6,025 | |
| 26 December 2002 | Livingston | A | 0–3 | 5,103 | |
| 29 December 2002 | Partick Thistle | A | 0–0 | 5,109 | |
| 2 January 2003 | Kilmarnock | H | 2–2 | 7,183 | Dodds, McIntyre |
| 29 January 2003 | Celtic | A | 0–2 | 55,204 | |
| 1 February 2003 | Motherwell | H | 2–1 | 6,672 | Tod, Miller |
| 9 February 2003 | Dundee | H | 1–1 | 10,457 | |
| 16 February 2003 | Aberdeen | A | 0–3 | 9,146 | |
| 1 March 2003 | Dunfermline Athletic | H | 3–0 | 6,004 | Craig Easton, Tod, Ogunmade |
| 9 March 2003 | Hibernian | A | 1–1 | 7,518 | McIntyre |
| 15 March 2003 | Livingston | H | 0–1 | 6,247 | |
| 5 April 2003 | Heart of Midlothian | A | 1–2 | 9,663 | Griffin |
| 13 April 2003 | Rangers | H | 1–4 | 10,013 | Dodds |
| 26 April 2003 | Hibernian | H | 1–2 | 6,758 | McCracken |
| 3 May 2003 | Motherwell | A | 2–2 | 9,056 | Miller, McIntyre |
| 10 May 2003 | Livingston | A | 2–1 | 6,314 | McIntyre, Miller |
| 17 May 2003 | Partick Thistle | A | 1–0 | 6,357 | Paterson |
| 24 May 2003 | Aberdeen | H | 0–2 | 8,516 | |

=== Scottish Cup ===
| Date | Round | Opponent | Venue | Result | Attendance | Scorers |
|---|---|---|---|---|---|---|
| 25 January 2003 | Third round | Hibernian | H | 2–3 | 8,986 | O'Donnell, Hamilton |

=== Scottish League Cup ===
| Date | Round | Opponent | Venue | Result | Attendance | Scorers |
|---|---|---|---|---|---|---|
| 24 September 2002 | Second round | Queen's Park | H | 4–1 | 3,600 | O'Donnell (3), Thompson |
| 29 October 2002 | Third round | Airdrie United | A | 2–1 | 1,768 | Thompson (2) |
| 13 November 2002 | Quarter–finals | Livingston | A | 2–0 | 3,592 | Lilley (2) |
| 6 February 2003 | Semi–finals | Celtic | N | 0–3 | 18,856 | |

== Player statistics ==
During the 2002–03 season, United used 32 different players, with a further played named as a substitute who did not make an appearance on the pitch. The table below shows the number of appearances and goals scored by each player.

| No. | Pos | Nat | Player | Total | | SPL | | Scottish Cup | | League Cup | |
| No. | Pos | Nat | Player | Apps | Goals | Apps | Goals | Apps | Goals | Apps | Goals |
|---|---|---|---|---|---|---|---|---|---|---|---|
| 1 | GK | (Scotland) SCO | Paul Gallacher | 38 | 0 | 34 | 0 | 1 | 0 | 3 | 0 |
| 2 | DF | (Scotland) SCO | Jamie McCunnie | 21 | 0 | 17 | 0 | 1 | 0 | 3 | 0 |
| 3 | DF | (Scotland) SCO | Warren Cummings | 12 | 0 | 11 | 0 | 0 | 0 | 1 | 0 |
| 4 | DF | (Northern Ireland) NIR | Danny Griffin | 17 | 1 | 17 | 1 | 0 | 0 | 0 | 0 |
| 5 | DF | (Scotland) SCO | Kevin McGowne | 13 | 0 | 12 | 0 | 0 | 0 | 1 | 0 |
| 5 | DF | (Scotland) SCO | Gary Bollan | 13 | 0 | 13 | 0 | 0 | 0 | 0 | 0 |
| 6 | DF | (Scotland) SCO | Jim Lauchlan | 28 | 0 | 24 | 0 | 1 | 0 | 3 | 0 |
| 7 | MF | (Scotland) SCO | Craig Easton | 41 | 1 | 36 | 1 | 1 | 0 | 4 | 0 |
| 8 | MF | (Scotland) SCO | Charlie Miller | 38 | 4 | 34 | 4 | 1 | 0 | 3 | 0 |
| 9 | FW | (Scotland) SCO | Derek Lilley | 37 | 4 | 33 | 2 | 0 | 0 | 4 | 2 |
| 10 | FW | (Scotland) SCO | Jim McIntyre | 37 | 9 | 32 | 9 | 1 | 0 | 4 | 0 |
| 11 | MF | (Scotland) SCO | Jim Paterson | 38 | 1 | 33 | 1 | 1 | 0 | 4 | 0 |
| 12 | FW | (Scotland) SCO | Allan Smart | 18 | 0 | 17 | 0 | 0 | 0 | 1 | 0 |
| 14 | FW | (Scotland) SCO | Billy Dodds | 16 | 2 | 14 | 2 | 1 | 0 | 1 | 0 |
| 14 | DF | (England) ENG | Hasney Aljofree | 1 | 0 | 1 | 0 | 0 | 0 | 0 | 0 |
| 15 | MF | (Scotland) SCO | Stuart Duff | 38 | 0 | 34 | 0 | 0 | 0 | 4 | 0 |
| 16 | MF | (Northern Ireland) NIR | Stephen Carson | 7 | 0 | 7 | 0 | 0 | 0 | 0 | 0 |
| 17 | FW | (Scotland) SCO | Jim Hamilton | 16 | 5 | 13 | 4 | 1 | 1 | 2 | 0 |
| 18 | MF | (Greece) GRE | Anastasios Venetis | 2 | 0 | 2 | 0 | 0 | 0 | 0 | 0 |
| 18 | DF | (Scotland) SCO | Andy Tod | 13 | 2 | 13 | 2 | 0 | 0 | 0 | 0 |
| 19 | FW | (Scotland) SCO | Steven Thompson | 23 | 9 | 20 | 6 | 0 | 0 | 3 | 3 |
| 21 | MF | (Iceland) ISL | Arnar Gunnlaugsson | 7 | 0 | 6 | 0 | 0 | 0 | 1 | 0 |
| 21 | MF | (Trinidad and Tobago) TTO | Russell Latapy | 7 | 0 | 7 | 0 | 0 | 0 | 0 | 0 |
| 22 | GK | (Scotland) SCO | Alan Combe | 6 | 0 | 5 | 0 | 0 | 0 | 1 | 0 |
| 23 | FW | (Scotland) SCO | David Winters | 2 | 0 | 1 | 0 | 0 | 0 | 1 | 0 |
| 24 | DF | (Scotland) SCO | David McCracken | 30 | 1 | 25 | 1 | 1 | 0 | 4 | 0 |
| 27 | DF | (Scotland) SCO | Mark Wilson | 31 | 1 | 26 | 1 | 1 | 0 | 4 | 0 |
| 28 | MF | (Scotland) SCO | Stephen O'Donnell | 14 | 4 | 11 | 0 | 1 | 1 | 2 | 3 |
| 29 | FW | (Nigeria) NGR | Daniel Ogunmade | 4 | 1 | 4 | 1 | 0 | 0 | 0 | 0 |
| 35 | DF | (Italy) ITA | Daniele Chiarini | 5 | 0 | 4 | 0 | 1 | 0 | 0 | 0 |
| 39 | FW | (Scotland) SCO | Stephen McGowan | 1 | 0 | 1 | 0 | 0 | 0 | 0 | 0 |
| 47 | FW | (Scotland) SCO | Aaron Conway | 1 | 0 | 1 | 0 | 0 | 0 | 0 | 0 |

=== Goalscorers ===
Thirteen players scored for the United first team with the team scoring 43 goals in total. Steven Thompson and Jim McIntyre were the top goalscorers, scoring nine goals apiece.

| Name | League | Cups | Total |
|---|---|---|---|
| Jim McIntyre | 9 | 0 | 9 |
| Steven Thompson | 6 | 3 | 9 |
| Jim Hamilton | 4 | 1 | 5 |
| Derek Lilley | 2 | 2 | 4 |
| Stephen O'Donnell | 1 | 3 | 4 |
| Charlie Miller | 3 | 0 | 3 |
| Billy Dodds | 2 | 0 | 2 |
| Andy Tod | 2 | 0 | 2 |
| Craig Easton | 1 | 0 | 1 |
| Danny Griffin | 1 | 0 | 1 |
| Daniel Ogunmade | 1 | 0 | 1 |
| Jim Paterson | 1 | 0 | 1 |
| Mark Wilson | 1 | 0 | 1 |

=== Discipline ===
During the 2001–02 season, five United players were sent off, and 20 players received at least one yellow card. In total, the team received six dismissals and 67 cautions.

| Name | Cautions | Dismissals |
|---|---|---|
| Allan Smart | | (red card) 2 |
| Charlie Miller | (yellow card) 8 | (red card) 1 |
| Jim Lauchlan | (yellow card) 7 | (red card) 1 |
| Jim McIntyre | (yellow card) 5 | (red card) 1 |
| Alan Combe | | (red card) 1 |
| Craig Easton | (yellow card) 9 | |
| Derek Lilley | (yellow card) 6 | |
| David McCracken | (yellow card) 4 | |
| Jamie McCunnie | (yellow card) 4 | |
| Steven Thompson | (yellow card) 4 | |
| Andy Tod | (yellow card) 4 | |
| Gary Bollan | (yellow card) 3 | |
| Stuart Duff | (yellow card) 2 | |
| Danny Griffin | (yellow card) 2 | |
| Kevin McGowne | (yellow card) 2 | |
| Warren Cummings | (yellow card) 1 | |
| Billy Dodds | (yellow card) 1 | |
| Paul Gallacher | (yellow card) 1 | |
| Jim Hamilton | (yellow card) 1 | |
| Stephen O'Donnell | (yellow card) 1 | |
| Jim Paterson | (yellow card) 1 | |
| Mark Wilson | (yellow card) 1 | |

== Competitions ==
=== League table ===
| Pos | Team | Pld | W | D | L | GF | GA | GD | Pts | Qualification or relegation (Note: Teams played each other three times (33 matches), before the league split into two groups (the top six and the bottom six) for the last five matches.) |
|---|---|---|---|---|---|---|---|---|---|---|
| 8 | Aberdeen | 38 | 13 | 10 | 15 | 41 | 54 | −13 | 49 | |
| 9 | Livingston | 38 | 9 | 8 | 21 | 48 | 62 | −14 | 35 | |
| 10 | Partick Thistle | 38 | 8 | 11 | 19 | 37 | 58 | −21 | 35 | |
| 11 | Dundee United | 38 | 7 | 11 | 20 | 35 | 68 | −33 | 32 | |
| 12 | Motherwell | 38 | 7 | 7 | 24 | 45 | 71 | −26 | 28 | Spared from relegation (Note: As the First Division champions Falkirk did not have a suitable ground for the SPL, bottom club Motherwell were spared from relegation.) |

Source: Scottish Professional Football League
Rules for classification: 1) Points; 2) Goal difference; 3) Goals scored

== Transfers ==
=== In ===
| Date | Player | From | |
|---|---|---|---|
| 6 July 2002 | (Scotland) Kevin McGowne | (Scotland) Kilmarnock | Free |
| 30 July 2002 | (Iceland) Arnar Gunnlaugsson | (England) Leicester City | Free |
| 1 January 2003 | (Scotland) Billy Dodds | (Scotland) Rangers | Free |
| 10 January 2003 | (Italy) Daniele Chiarini | (Scotland) Partick Thistle | Swap |
| 28 January 2003 | (Scotland) Gary Bollan | (Scotland) Livingston | Free |
| 23 February 2003 | (Trinidad and Tobago) Russell Latapy | (Scotland) Rangers | Free |
| 16 May 2003 | (Scotland) Barry Robson | (Scotland) Inverness CT | £70,000 |
| 3 June 2003 | (Scotland) Alan Archibald | (Scotland) Partick Thistle | Free |
| 3 June 2003 | (Scotland) Scott Paterson | (Scotland) Partick Thistle | Free |
| 27 June 2003 | (England) Tony Bullock | (Scotland) Ross County | Swap |

=== Out ===
| Date | Player | To | Fee |
|---|---|---|---|
| 1 July 2002 | (Scotland) Stephen Wright | (England) Scunthorpe United | Free |
| 22 July 2002 | (Wales) David Partridge | (Scotland) Motherwell | Free |
| 30 August 2002 | (England) Hasney Aljofree | (England) Plymouth Argyle | Free |
| 1 January 2003 | (Scotland) Steven Thompson | (Scotland) Rangers | £200,000 |
| 16 January 2003 | (Scotland) Kevin McGowne | (Scotland) Partick Thistle | Free |
| 16 January 2003 | (Greece) Anastasios Venetis | (Scotland) Ross County | Free |
| 31 January 2003 | (Iceland) Arnar Gunnlaugsson | (Iceland) KR | Free |
| 7 March 2003 | (Scotland) Jim Hamilton | (Scotland) Dunfermline Athletic | Free |
| 22 May 2003 | (Northern Ireland) Stephen Carson | (England) Barnsley | Free |
| 22 May 2003 | (Italy) Daniele Chiarini | (Scotland) Partick Thistle | Free |
| 31 May 2003 | (Scotland) Jim Lauchlan | (Scotland) Livingston | Free |
| 31 May 2003 | (Scotland) Derek Lilley | (Scotland) Livingston | Free |
| 27 June 2003 | (Scotland) Jamie McCunnie | (Scotland) Ross County | Swap |
| 27 June 2003 | (Scotland) David Winters | (Scotland) Ross County | Swap |

=== Loans in ===
| Date | Player | To | Until |
|---|---|---|---|
| 23 August 2002 | (Scotland) Warren Cummings | (England) Chelsea | January |
| 28 January 2003 | (Scotland) Andy Tod | (England) Bradford City | End of season |

=== Loans out ===
| Date | Player | From | Until |
|---|---|---|---|
| 1 January 2003 | (Scotland) David Winters | (Scotland) Ross County | End of season |
| 14 August 2002 | (Scotland) Hugh Davidson | (Scotland) Stirling Albion | January |
| 23 August 2002 | (Scotland) Stephen McConalogue | (Scotland) Clyde | End of season |
| 29 June 2003 | (Scotland) Stephen O'Donnell | (Scotland) Ross County | January |

== See also ==
- 2002–03 Scottish Premier League
- 2002–03 Scottish Cup
- 2002–03 in Scottish football
