= 2003–04 Dundee United F.C. season =

Dundee United
2003–04 season
- Chairman: Eddie Thompson
- Manager: Ian McCall
- Stadium: Tannadice Park
- SPL: Fifth place
- Scottish Cup: Third round
- League Cup: Third round
- Top goalscorer: League: Billy Dodds (10); All: Jim McIntyre (11)
- Highest home attendance: 12,292 vs. Dundee, SPL, 26 October 2003
- Lowest home attendance: 2,899 vs. Livingston, League Cup, 29 October 2003
Home colours	Away colours

The 2003–04 season was the 95th year of football played by Dundee United, and covers the period from 1 July 2003 to 30 June 2004. United finished the season in fifth place.

== Summary ==
Dundee United played a total of 41 competitive matches during the 2003–04 season. The team finished fifth in the Scottish Premier League.

In the cup competitions, United were knocked out of the Scottish Cup in the third round for the second successive season, losing to Dunfermline Athletic. Livingston knocked United out of the Scottish League Cup in the third round.

A host of new signings arrived at the club with Ian McCall securing deals from the lower divisions. Mark Kerr, Owen Coyle and Collin Samuel arrived from Falkirk, McCall's former club. Barry Robson also arrived from Inverness Caledonian Thistle and Scotland international Derek McInnes was purchased from recently relegated Premiership club West Bromwich Albion.

Seven players were signed during the 2003–04 season, with a total transfer cost of around £200,000. Another player was signed before the start of next season. Five players left the club during the season with no transfer involving a fee. Two players were loaned out during the season with three players also released before next season.

The club's playing kits were sponsored by Morning, Noon and Night for the first time.

=== Early season ===
United got off to a poor start in the league. The first match against Hibs at home ended in a disappointing defeat. The following week, United were thrashed 5–0 away against Celtic. The team didn't end up winning a game till mid-September when United defeated Partick Thistle 2–0 with Charlie Miller scoring a brace.

The team began their Scottish League Cup campaign with a 3–1 home victory over Morton but yet the team's league form was patchy. The first Dundee derby of the season ended in a poor 1–1 draw and then United lost to eventual winners Livingston at the end of October to end the team's league cup campaign. By the end of November, United had picked up just 12 points and were already out of the Cup.

=== Winter/New Year ===
December was a lot brighter for United with victories over Kilmarnock 2–0 away and a 2–0 home win over Livingston along with a bright performance away at Ibrox in an unlucky 2–1 defeat to Rangers.

However, in the New Year, United crashed out of the Scottish Cup third round away to Dunfermline Athletic who would go on to be finalists that season. The team then enjoyed a 3–2 win over Aberdeen and this would start a memorable unbeaten home record that would stretch out until April.

Ian McCall would pick up the Manager of the Month award for March 2004.

== Fixtures and results ==
All results are written with Dundee United's score first.

=== Scottish Premier League ===
Date	Opponent	Venue	Result	Attendance	Scorers
9 August 2003	Hibernian	H	1–2	9,809	Samuel
16 August 2003	Celtic	A	0–5	57,658	
23 August 2003	Heart of Midlothian	A	0–3	11,395	
31 August 2003	Rangers	H	1–3	9,752	Dodds
13 September 2003	Livingston	A	0–0	5,344	
20 September 2003	Partick Thistle	A	0–2	4,711	Miller (2)
27 September 2003	Kilmarnock	H	1–1	6,529	McLaren
4 October 2003	Motherwell	H	0–2	6,194	
18 October 2003	Aberdeen	A	1–0	11,244	McLaren
26 October 2003	Dundee	H	1–1	12,292	McIntyre
1 November 2003	Dunfermline Athletic	A	0–2	5,078	
8 November 2003	Hibernian	A	2–2	8,756	McLaren, Robson
22 November 2003	Celtic	H	1–5	10,802	
30 November 2003	Heart of Midlothian	H	2–1	6,343	Archibald, McInnes
6 December 2003	Rangers	A	1–2	49,307	Dodds
13 December 2003	Livingston	H	2–0	5,421	Dodds (2)
23 December 2003	Partick Thistle	H	0–0	6,440	
27 December 2003	Kilmarnock	A	2–0	6,062	Dodds, McIntyre
3 January 2004	Motherwell	A	1–3	5,549	Wilson
17 January 2004	Aberdeen	H	3–2	6,666	Robson, Miller, Dodds
24 January 2004	Dundee	A	1–2	10,747	Dodds
31 January 2004	Dunfermline Athletic	H	1–0	5,564	McIntyre
10 February 2004	Hibernian	H	0–0	6,389	
14 February 2004	Celtic	A	1–2	58,698	Archibald
21 February 2004	Heart of Midlothian	A	1–3	10,265	McIntyre
29 February 2004	Rangers	H	2–0	10,496	Kerr, McLaren
13 March 2004	Partick Thistle	A	1–1	3,510	Robson
20 March 2004	Kilmarnock	H	4–1	5,757	McIntyre (3), Miller
24 March 2004	Livingston	A	3–2	3,082	Scotland, Samuel, McIntyre
27 March 2004	Motherwell	H	1–0	7,585	Scotland
3 April 2004	Aberdeen	A	0–3	8,449	
11 April 2004	Dundee	H	2–2	9,571	Dodds (2)
17 April 2004	Dunfermline Athletic	A	1–1	4,409	McCracken
24 April 2004	Rangers	H	3–3	10,496	Dodds, Scotland (2)
1 May 2003	Heart of Midlothian	H	0–2	6,620	
8 May 2004	Motherwell	A	1–0	5,722	Wilson
11 May 2004	Dunfermline Athletic	H	3–2	5,998	Miller, Innes, Scotland
16 May 2004	Celtic	A	1–2	58,386	Wilson

=== Scottish Cup ===
Date	Round	Opponent	Venue	Result	Attendance	Scorers
10 January 2004	Third round	Dunfermline Athletic	A	1–3	5,078	McInnes

=== Scottish League Cup ===
Date	Round	Opponent	Venue	Result	Attendance	Scorers
23 September 2003	Second round	Greenock Morton	H	3–1	5,638	McLaren, McIntyre (2)
29 October 2003	Third round	Livingston	H	0–1	2,899	

== Player statistics ==
During the 2003–04 season, United used 24 different players, with a further three players named as a substitute who did not make an appearance on the pitch. The table below shows the number of appearances and goals scored by each player.

No.	Pos	Nat	Player	Total		SPL		Scottish Cup		League Cup	
No.	Pos	Nat	Player	Apps	Goals	Apps	Goals	Apps	Goals	Apps	Goals
1	GK	(Scotland) SCO	Paul Gallacher	35	0	33	0	1	0	1	0
2	DF	(Northern Ireland) NIR	Danny Griffin	14	0	13	0	0	0	1	0
3	DF	(Scotland) SCO	Jim Paterson	19	0	16	0	1	0	2	0
4	MF	(Scotland) SCO	Derek McInnes	37	2	35	1	1	1	1	0
5	DF	(Scotland) SCO	Alan Archibald	41	2	38	2	1	0	2	0
6	DF	(Scotland) SCO	Gary Bollan	2	0	2	0	0	0	0	0
7	MF	(Scotland) SCO	Mark Kerr	35	1	33	1	0	0	2	0
8	MF	(Scotland) SCO	Charlie Miller	28	5	26	5	1	0	1	0
9	FW	(Trinidad and Tobago) TTO	Collin Samuel	29	2	26	2	1	0	2	0
10	FW	(Scotland) SCO	Jim McIntyre	32	11	30	9	0	0	2	2
11	MF	(Scotland) SCO	Barry Robson	29	3	28	3	0	0	1	0
12	DF	(Scotland) SCO	Scott Paterson	3	0	3	0	0	0	0	0
14	FW	(Scotland) SCO	Billy Dodds	35	10	33	10	1	0	1	0
15	MF	(Scotland) SCO	Stuart Duff	20	0	18	0	1	0	1	0
16	FW	(Republic of Ireland) IRL	Owen Coyle	4	0	3	0	0	0	1	0
17	GK	(England) ENG	Tony Bullock	6	0	5	0	0	0	1	0
18	MF	(Scotland) SCO	Craig Easton	24	0	22	0	1	0	1	0
19	DF	(Scotland) SCO	David McCracken	34	1	32	1	1	0	1	0
20	FW	(Trinidad and Tobago) TTO	Jason Scotland	23	5	21	5	1	0	1	0
21	DF	(Scotland) SCO	Mark Wilson	34	3	32	3	1	0	1	0
22	MF	(Scotland) SCO	Andy McLaren	30	5	27	4	1	0	2	1
25	DF	(Scotland) SCO	Chris Innes	31	1	29	1	0	0	2	0
27	MF	(Scotland) SCO	Graeme Holmes	4	0	3	0	1	0	0	0
32	FW	(Scotland) SCO	Aaron Conway	1	0	1	0	0	0	0	0

=== Goalscorers ===
Thirteen players scored for the United first team with the team scoring 51 goals in total. Jim McIntyre was the top goalscorer with eleven goals.

Name	League	Cups	Total
Jim McIntyre	9	2	11
Billy Dodds	10	0	10
Charlie Miller	5	0	5
Jason Scotland	5	0	5
Andy McLaren	4	1	5
Barry Robson	3	0	3
Mark Wilson	3	0	3
Alan Archibald	2	0	2
Collin Samuel	2	0	2
Derek McInnes	1	1	2
Chris Innes	1	0	1
Mark Kerr	1	0	1
David McCracken	1	0	1

=== Discipline ===
During the 2003–04 season, three United players were sent off, and 18 players received at least one yellow card. In total, the team received three dismissals and 69 cautions.

Name	Cautions	Dismissals
Scott Paterson	(yellow card) 8	(red card) 1
Barry Robson	(yellow card) 6	(red card) 1
Billy Dodds	(yellow card) 5	(red card) 1
Andy McLaren	(yellow card) 9	
Chris Innes	(yellow card) 7	
Derek McInnes	(yellow card) 7	
Mark Kerr	(yellow card) 5	
Charlie Miller	(yellow card) 5	
Alan Archibald	(yellow card) 3	
Mark Wilson	(yellow card) 3	
Stuart Duff	(yellow card) 2	
Craig Easton	(yellow card) 2	
David McCracken	(yellow card) 2	
Danny Griffin	(yellow card) 1	
Jim McIntyre	(yellow card) 1	
Jim Paterson	(yellow card) 1	
Collin Samuel	(yellow card) 1	

== Transfers ==
=== In ===
Date	Player	From	Fee
1 July 2003	(Scotland) Mark Kerr	(Scotland) Falkirk	Free
11 July 2003	(Republic of Ireland) Owen Coyle	(Scotland) Falkirk	Free
11 July 2003	(Scotland) Derek McInnes	(England) West Bromwich Albion	Free
11 July 2003	(Trinidad and Tobago) Collin Samuel	(Scotland) Falkirk	£100,000
15 July 2003	(Trinidad and Tobago) Jason Scotland	(Trinidad and Tobago) Defence Force	Free
28 August 2003	(Scotland) Andy McLaren	(Scotland) Kilmarnock	Free
29 August 2003	(Scotland) Chris Innes	(Scotland) Kilmarnock	£100,000
2 June 2004	(Scotland) James Grady	(Scotland) Partick Thistle	Free

=== Out ===
Date	Player	To	Fee
14 February 2004	(Scotland) Stephen McGowan	Released	Free
14 February 2004	(Nigeria) Daniel Ogunmade	(Scotland) Ross County	Free
7 January 2004	(Northern Ireland) Danny Griffin	(England) Stockport County	Free
13 January 2004	(Scotland) Gary Bollan	(Scotland) Motherwell	Free
31 May 2004	(Scotland) Craig Easton	(Scotland) Livingston	Free
31 May 2004	(Scotland) Paul Gallacher	(England) Norwich City	Free
31 May 2004	(Scotland) Charlie Miller	(Norway) SK Brann	Free

=== Loans out ===
Date	Player	To	Until
30 August 2003	(Nigeria) Danny Ogunmade	(Scotland) Forfar Athletic	January
24 November 2003	(Republic of Ireland) Owen Coyle	(Scotland) Airdrie United	Loan

== See also ==
- 2003–04 Scottish Premier League
- 2003–04 Scottish Cup
- 2003–04 in Scottish football
