= David McCracken =

British footballer (born 1981)

Personal information
- Full name: David McCracken
- Date of birth: 16 October 1981 (age 45)
- Place of birth: Glasgow, Scotland
- Position: Centre-back

Youth career
- 1998–2000: Dundee United

Senior career*
Years	Team	Apps	(Gls)
2000–2007	Dundee United	179	(8)
2007–2009	Wycombe Wanderers	76	(2)
2009–2010	Milton Keynes Dons	41	(1)
2010–2011	Brentford	2	(0)
2011	→ Bristol Rovers (loan)	10	(0)
2011–2013	St Johnstone	44	(1)
2013–2017	Falkirk	94	(8)
2017–2018	Peterhead	4	(1)

International career
2001–2003	Scotland U21	5	(0)

Managerial career
- 2019-2021: Falkirk (co-manager)
- * Club domestic league appearances and goals

David McCracken (born 16 October 1981) is a Scottish football player and coach, whose last role was as co-manager of Falkirk between 2019 and 2021. McCracken, who played as a central defender, was a Scotland under-21 internationalist, having made five appearances at that level between 2001 and 2003. McCracken started his career with Dundee United in the Scottish Premier League and was a first team player there for seven years before leaving in May 2007. He subsequently played in England for Football League clubs Wycombe Wanderers, Milton Keynes Dons and Brentford before returning to Scotland with St Johnstone in 2011. He joined Falkirk in August 2013, playing with the club for four seasons, before finishing his playing career with Peterhead.

== Club career ==
=== Dundee United ===
Born in Glasgow, Scotland, McCracken began his football career at Dundee United, where he revealed that it was a two-year apprenticeship. McCracken progressed through the youth ranks at the Tangerines, where he eventually signed his first professional contract with the club. McCracken made his competitive senior debut in a Scottish Premier League (SPL) match against Celtic on 2 May 2000, as Dundee United loss 1–0. In a follow–up match against Motherwell, however, he received a straight red card in the 28th minute for a professional foul on John Spencer, as the Tangerines loss 2–1. After the match, manager Paul Sturrock believed that McCracken was unlucky to be sent–off. At the end of the 1999–00 season, he made two appearances in all competitions.

Ahead of the 2000–01 season, McCracken was promoted to Dundee United’s first team squad. In the opening game of the season, he scored his first goal for the Tangerines, in a 2–1 defeat to Celtic at Tannadice. However, in a match against Rangers on 1 October 2000, McCracken suffered an injury and was substituted in the 16th minute, as Dundee United loss 3–0. On 17 December 2000, he made his return from injury, starting a 1–1 draw against Rangers. Following this, McCracken spent the rest of the 2000–01 season, playing for the club’s reserve. At the end of the 2000–01 season, he made nine appearances and scoring once in all competitions.

Ahead of the 2001–02 season, McCracken suffered a groin injury during the Dundee United's pre–season match. On 11 August 2001, he returned to the first team, coming on as a 76th-minute substitute in a 1–0 win against St Johnstone. His return led to McCracken signing a contract with the Tangerines, keeping him until 2005. By December, he mostly spent the rest of the season, playing for Dundee United’s reserve team. McCracken had to wait until on 23 February 2002 to make his first team return, starting the whole game, in a 2–2 draw against Ayr United in the quarter–finals of the Scottish Cup to earn a replay. Two weeks later, on 9 March 2002, he started in the left–back position against Hearts and set up the club’s second goal of the game, in a 2–1 win. McCracken helped Dundee United kept three consecutive clean sheets in the league between 13 April 2002 and 27 April 2002. At the end of the 2001–02 season, McCracken made twenty–four appearances in all competitions.

However, at the start of the 2002–03 season, McCracken didn’t feature in the first team for the first two months. He made his first appearance of the season, starting the whole game, in a 4–1 win against Queen's Park in the second round of the Scottish Cup. Following this, McCracken regained his first team place, playing in the centre–back position throughout the season. He then scored his first goal for Dundee United in four years, in a 2–1 loss against Hibernian on 26 April 2003. At the end of the 2002–03 season, McCracken made thirty appearances and scoring once in all competitions.

Ahead of the 2003–04 season, McCracken was told by manager Ian McCall that he must establish himself in the first team for Dundee United, having been fringe from the first team. McCracken was subjected to a transfer move when manager McCall offered cash sum plus him, in exchange for Hibernian’s Mathias Kouo-Doumbé. Motherwell also offered to sign McCracken with cash in exchange for Martyn Corrigan, but neither of the move have been materialised. After the summer transfer window, he did not play in the first team for a month and played for the Tangerines’ reserve team. On 18 October 2003, McCracken made his first team return, starting the whole game and helped Dundee United win 1–0 win against Aberdeen. Following his return from injury, he regained his first team place for the Tangerines, playing in the centre–back position. In a match against Hibernian on 8 November 2003, he scored a last minute own goal that saw both teams drew 2–2. McCracken helped the Tangerines kept three consecutive clean sheets in the league between 13 December 2003 and 27 December 2003. On 17 April 2004 McCracken scored his first goal of the season, in a 1–1 draw against Dunfermline Athletic. He was then part of the side that finished fifth in the league to give the Dundee United their best finish since 1996–97. At the end of the 2003–04 season, McCracken made thirty–four appearances and scoring once in all competitions, bringing his total appearances to 99 for the Tangerines.

At the start of the 2004–05 season, McCracken continued to remain in the first team spotlight, playing in the centre–back position. He captained Dundee United for the first time in his career and helped the club beat Stranraer in the second round of the Scottish League Cup. However, his performance soon dipped and was dropped to the substitute bench. Despite this, McCracken came on as a 82nd minute substitute and played through extra time, as he helped the Tangerines beat Hibernian 2–1 to reach the semi-finals of the Scottish League Cup. In a follow–up match against Livingston, McCracken scored the only goal of the game, in a 1–0 win. On 1 January 2005, he scored the opening goal of the game with a header, in a 1–1 draw against Rangers. With his contract expiring at the end of the 2004–05 season, manager McCall ruled out selling McCracken after he was linked with a move to Livingston. However, during the fourth round of the Scottish Cup tie against Queen of the South, McCracken suffered a foot injury and was substituted in the 36th minute, as Dundee United won 3–0. On 5 March 2005 he made his return from injury, only to be substituted after suffering an elbow injury in the 11th minute, as the Tangerines loss 2–0 against Motherwell. After being out for two months, McCracken made his return from injury, coming on as a late substitute, in a 1–0 loss against Dunfermline Athletic on 15 May 2005. He appeared as an unused substitute in the Scottish Cup final, as Dundee United lost 1–0 against Celtic. At the end of the 2004–05 season, McCracken made thirty–one appearances and scoring two times in all competitions. He ended the speculation to his future at the Tangerines by being awarded a new two-year contract on 19 July 2005.

At the start of the 2005–06 season, McCracken made his European debut, starting the whole game, in a 0–0 draw against MyPa in the first leg of the UEFA Cup second qualifying round. However, his performance dipped once again that he was dropped to the substitute bench for three matches. On 17 September 2005 McCracken made his return to the starting line–up in a 2–0 win against Livingston. A week later, on 24 September 2005, he scored his first goal of the season, in a 2–1 loss against Dunfermline Athletic. Following this, McCracken regained his first team place, playing in the centre–back position. He then scored his second goal of the season to help Dundee United drew 2–2 against Kilmarnock on 25 March 2006. On the last game of the season, McCracken helped the Tangerines drew 1–1 against Motherwell to earn a ninth place finish in the SPL for a second consecutive season. At the end of the 2005–06 season, he made thirty–seven appearances and scoring two times in all competitions, taking his total of appearances for Dundee United to 165.

The start of the 2006–07 season saw McCracken started in the first six league matches for Dundee United. However, he missed one match due to an injury. But McCracken made his return to the starting line–up, in a 1–1 draw against Motherwell on 23 September 2006. Following this, he regained his first team place, playing in the centre–back position. This last until he suffered a hamstring injury that saw him out for three matches. McCracken scored on his return from injury, in a 3–2 win against Motherwell on 16 December 2006. On 19 January 2007, McCracken was told he was free to leave the Tangerines at the end of the 2006–07 season. Despite this, McCracken’s place in the first team at Dundee United was not affected as the season went by. He then helped the Tangerines kept three consecutive clean sheets in the league between 27 January 2007 and 18 February 2007. McCracken made his final appearance for Dundee United on the last game of the season, starting the whole game, in a 0–0 draw at home to Motherwell. At the end of the 2006–07 season, McCracken made thirty–six appearances and scoring once in all competitions.

=== Wycombe Wanderers ===
McCracken said he was interested in playing in England after leaving Dundee United. On 13 June 2007, McCracken joined Wycombe Wanderers on a two-year deal, playing his first English club. After the move, he says joining the Chairboys was good opportunities to work under manager compatriot Paul Lambert.

McCracken was then announced as captain on 9 August 2007, having captained Wycombe Wanderers in the pre–season matches. He made his debut for the Chairboys, starting the whole game, in the 1–0 loss at home to Accrington Stanley in the opening game of the season. Following the Chairboys’ defeat against Peterborough United on 14 October 2007, his performance along with the defenders were criticised by manager Lambert for lacking courage, which McCracken agreed with his words in response. Since joining Wycombe Wanderers, McCracken started the first thirteen league matches of the season until missing one match through suspension. He made his return to the first team, starting the whole game, in a 0–0 draw against Wrexham on 7 November 2007. However, his return was short–lived when McCracken suffered a tore calf injury and was out for two weeks. On 14 December 2007 he returned from injury, starting in a 2–0 win over Morecambe. McCracken then helped the Chairboys kept three consecutive clean sheets in the league between 29 December 2007 and 8 January 2008. Following his return from injury, he regained his first team place, playing in the centre–back position, as well as, retaining his captaincy. In a match against Bury on 12 February 2008, McCracken made a mistake that led to the opposition team scoring an equaliser, costing Wycombe Wanderers a win, in a 2–2 draw. Four days later, on 16 February 2008, he made amends for mistakes by scoring his first goal, in the 1–0 home win over Rotherham United, which was his only goal in his first season at Adams Park. However, in a match against Hereford United on 15 March 2008, McCracken suffered an injury and was taken off at half–time, as Wycombe Wanderers loss 1–0. On 15 April 2008 he returned from injury, coming on as a late substitute in a 1–0 win against Grimsby Town. However, McCracken appeared an unused substitute bench in both legs of the League Two play–offs, as Wycombe Wanderers loss 2–1 on aggregate. He successfully predicted that the season would be a failure if the Chairboys didn’t make it to the Football League Two play-off final. Following the resignation of manager Lambert, McCracken said he was devastated to hear the news, having persuaded him to make a move to the Chairboys and felt the squad let him down because of this. At the end of the 2007–08 season, McCracken went on to make forty appearances and scoring once in all competitions.

However, McCracken missed the opening game of the 2008–09 season, due to a calf injury. He made his first appearance of the season, starting the whole game, in a 2–0 win against Chester City on 16 August 2008. This was followed up by leading Wycombe Wanderers to keep four consecutive clean sheets in the next four league matches. Following his return, McCracken continued to remain as the captain of the Chairboys. He also spoke out that the Chairboys should "try and achieve the same again" on reaching the Football League play-offs in order to reach promotion to League One. In a match against Bury on 27 September 2008, McCracken headed in a goal, only for the goal to be disallowed despite the ball went over the line, as the Chairboys drew 0–0. After the match, he was critical of referee Stuart Attwell’s decision to disallow his goal. Despite this, McCracken led Wycombe Wanderers keeping three consecutive clean sheets in the league between 25 October 2008 and 15 November 2008. Following this, he led the Chairboys go on a winning start that saw them unbeaten for the first four months to the season. In a match against Gillingham on 28 December 2008, however, he suffered a calf injury and was substituted in the 15th minute, as the match ended in a 1–1 draw. On 23 January 2009, McCracken’s improved contract with Wycombe Wanderers was stalled, leading been the subject of transfer speculation. The next day on 24 January 2009, he made his return from injury, starting the whole game, in a 3–1 loss against AFC Bournemouth. Following his return from injury, McCracken regained his first team place, as he led the Chairboys maintain their good form in League Two. McCracken, once again, led Wycombe Wanderers keep four consecutive clean sheets in the four league matches between 17 February 2009 and 3 March 2009. However, in a match against Lincoln City on 10 March 2009, he suffered a groin injury and was substituted in the 54th minute, as the Chairboys loss 1–0. On 7 April 2009 McCracken returned from injury and set up the opening goal for John Akinde as Wycombe Wanderers won 2–1 against Darlington. On the last game of the season against Notts County, he scored an equalising goal from a six yards, as the match ended in a 1–2 home defeat, but the Chairboys were automatically promoted to Football League One nevertheless. At the end of the 2008–09 season, McCracken made forty–two appearances and scoring once in all competitions. For his performance, he was named in the PFA League Two Team of the Year for the 2008–09 season.

With his future at Wycombe Wanderers increasingly uncertain, McCracken was offered a new contract. However, on 18 June 2009, he, once again, turned down another deal with the Chairboys.

=== Milton Keynes Dons ===
On 20 June 2009 it was announced that he had signed for the Chairboys' neighbours Milton Keynes Dons on a two-year deal. On his first training with the Dons, McCracken said he never meet manager Roberto Di Matteo, who departed to manage West Bromwich Albion.

McCracken made his Milton Keynes Dons' debut in the opening game of the season, in a 0–0 draw against Hartlepool United. In a follow–up match against Swindon Town, he scored an own goal, in a 4–1 loss that saw the Dons eliminated in the first round of the League Cup. This was followed up by keeping two clean sheets in the league. On 18 September 2009, in a buildup to a match against his former club Wycombe Wanderers at Adams Park, manager Peter Taylor warned the club's supporter not to boo McCracken, as it would make him more motivated. His words proven to be right, as he helped Milton Keynes Dons win 1–0 against his former club on 19 September 2009. Since joining the Dons, McCracken quickly became a first team regular under Paul Ince and formed a centre–back partnership with Dean Lewington. He helped Milton Keynes Dons keep four consecutive clean sheets between 3 October 2009 and 17 October 2009. McCracken also started in every league match since the start of the season until he missed one match, due to accumulating five yellow cards. After serving a one match suspension, McCracken made his return to the starting line–up, in a 4–1 win against Hereford United in the quarter–finals of the Football League Trophy. However, in a match against Stockport County on 6 February 2010, he suffered a calf injury and was substituted, as the club won 3–1. After missing two matches, McCracken made his return to the starting line–up, in a 3–1 win against Southend United on 20 February 2010. A month later, on 27 March 2010, he scored his first goal for the club, in a 2–2 draw against Gillingham. After serving a two match suspension, McCracken made his return to the starting line–up, starting the whole game, in a 3–2 loss against Wycombe Wanderers on 17 April 2010. In a follow–up match against Leeds United, he received a straight red card in the 85th minute for a foul on Jermaine Beckford, as Milton Keynes Dons loss 4–1. But on the last game of the season, McCracken made his return to the starting line–up, in a 2–1 win against Walsall. At the end of the 2009–10 season, he made forty–eight appearances and scoring once in all competitions.

=== Brentford ===
On 3 July 2010, McCracken signed a two-year contract with another League One side Brentford. Upon joining the Bees, he said joining the club left him playing catch-up in terms of pre-season training.

McCracken made his debut for Brentford debut in the opening game of the season against Carlisle United, where he played 45 minutes before being substituted at half time, in a 2–0 loss. Following, he made a little impact at the Bees and found himself placed on the substitute bench and made two more starts for the side. By the time McCracken left Brentford, he made three appearances in all competitions. On 23 June 2011, McCracken was released by the Bees after his contract was terminated by mutual consent. McCracken revealed that his poor debut performance led to him and Andy Scott having a fallen out. He also described his time at Brentord as "not the best time in his career".

==== Bristol Rovers (loan) ====
After making only two starts for the club, McCracken moved to Bristol Rovers on 18 January 2011 on an initial one-month loan deal.

He made his debut for the club, starting the whole game, in a 0–0 draw against Hartlepool United on the same day. In a follow–up match against Swindon Town, McCracken set up one of the goals, in a 3–1 win. On the last day of the transfer window, his loan spell at Bristol Rovers was extended, until the end of the season. In a match against his former club, Milton Keynes Dons, on 2 February 2011, he suffered a hamstring injury and was substituted in the 19th minute, as the club loss 2–1. After the match, McCracken was out for a month. On 19 March 2011, he made his return from injury, coming on as a late substitute, in a 1–0 win against Notts County. However, in a match against AFC Bournemouth on 25 April 2011, McCracken then received a red card for a professional foul after elbowing Adam Smith in a 2–1 loss, in what turns out to be his appearance for Bristol Rovers. At the end of the 2010–11 season, he made ten appearances in all competitions.

=== St Johnstone ===
On 23 June 2011 McCracken signed a two-year contract with St Johnstone, a few days after he was released by the club. Teammate Peter Enckelman praised manager Derek McInnes for signing McCracken and Frazer Wright after losing Michael Duberry on a free transfer, where he returned to England.

After missing the first two league matches of the season, he made finally made his debut for the Saints, in a 1–0 loss against Dunfermline Athletic on 13 August 2011. In a follow–up match against Celtic, McCracken was part of the squad when he helped the club beat them 1–0 at Celtic Park, giving them their first win since 1998. However, he missed one match, due to an injury. But McCracken made his return from injury, coming on as a 20th-minute substitute for the injured Frazer Wright, in a 2–0 loss against St Mirren in the last 16 of the Scottish League Cup. However, his return was short–lived when he suffered a hamstring injury that saw him out for two months. On 3 December 2012 McCracken returned from injury, coming on as a 11th-minute substitute for the injured Wright again, in a 2–1 win against Hearts. Following his return from injury, he soon won his first team place back, with his playing time increased at St Johnstone throughout the season. On 17 March 2012, McCracken scored his first goal for the Saints, in a 3–0 win over St Mirren. His contributions saw the Saints qualify for a place in Europe despite finishing sixth place. At the end of the 2011–12 season, he made thirty–two appearances and scoring once in all competitions.

At the start of the 2012–13 season, McCracken played in both legs of the UEFA Europa League second qualifying round against Turkish side Eskişehirspor, as St Johnstone went on to lose 4–1 on aggregate and was eliminated in the tournament. However, he soon found himself out of the starting eleven, due to competitions and his own illness. In a match against Celtic on 11 November 2012, however, McCracken fractured his cheek bone after clashing with Victor Wanyama and was substituted in the 9th minute, as the match ended in a 1–1 draw. Following a further diagnosis of the injury, it announced that he would miss up to six weeks and might require surgery. On 15 December 2012 McCracken returned to the starting line–up, in a 2–2 draw against Hearts. In a follow–up match, he scored his first goal of the season, in a 3–0 win over Cowdenbeath in the fourth round of the Scottish Cup to advance to the next round. His return was short–lived, due to his recovery on his cheek bone and missed one match as a result. On 26 December 2012, McCracken made his return from injury, in a 1–1 draw against his former club, Dundee United. Following his return from injury, he regained his first team place for the twelve matches. In a match against Kilmarnock on 9 March 2013, McCracken set up a goal for Murray Davidson to score the opener, in a 2–0 win, in what turns out to be his last appearance for the Saints. However, he did not play again, due to illness and his own injury concern. At the end of the 2012–13 season, McCracken made twenty–two appearances and scoring once in all competitions.

Following this, McCracken left the club after having his contract withdraw, but believes the club would have a change of heart and the main reason of his contract offer withdraw was his recurring of injuries. He reflected on the experience, saying it left him "vulnerable" and "scared."

=== Falkirk ===
Following his departure from St Johnstone, McCracken joined Falkirk on a one-year contract.

After a brief struggle with an injury at the beginning of the season, he made his debut for the Bairns, coming on as a 60th-minute substitute, in a 3–1 win against Dundee on 21 September 2013. After missing one match with an injury, McCracken made his return to the starting line–up, in a 2–0 loss against Hamilton Academical on 26 October 2013. In the fifth round of the Scottish Cup against Rangers on 30 November 2013, however, he received a straight red card in the 57th minute for a foul on Nicky Clark, in a 2–0 loss. McCracken helped Falkirk keep four consecutive clean sheets in the league between 21 December 2013 and 11 January 2014. After not playing for four weeks due to an injury, he made his return to the starting line–up, in a 2–1 loss against Dumbarton on 15 February 2014. On 1 March 2014, he scored his first goal for the Bairns, in a 4–2 win against Raith Rovers. Three weeks later, on 22 March 2014, McCracken scored his second goal for Falkirk, in a 2–0 win against Dumbarton. This was followed up by keeping two clean sheets for Falkirk. On 1 May 2014, he agreed a new one-year contract with the Bairns, keeping him until 2015. He played in both legs of the Premiership play-offs quarter–finals against Queen of the South, Falkirk won 4–3 on aggregate to advance to the next round. After missing the first leg of the Premiership play-offs semi–finals against Hamilton Academical due to injury, McCracken returned to the return leg, where the Bairns loss 1–0. At the end of the 2013–14 season, he made twenty–nine appearances and scoring two times in all competitions.

Ahead of the 2014–15 season, McCracken was given the captaincy and continued to establish himself in the Falkirk side. He then scored his first goal of the season, in a 6–0 win against Cowdenbeath on 26 October 2014. McCracken then scored a strike in the last minute of the game, in a 1–0 win against Hibernian on 6 December 2014. This was followed up by keeping two clean sheets for Falkirk. He scored two goals in two matches between 7 February 2015 and 14 February 2015 against Brechin City and Raith Rovers. On 31 March 2015, McCracken scored his fifth goal of the season, in a 1–0 win against Cowdenbeath. He then helped the Bairns reach the Scottish Cup Final after the Bairns beat Hibernian on 18 April 2015. For his performance, McCracken signed a one–year contract extension with Falkirk for another season. In the final, he started the match against Inverness Caledonian Thistle, but made a mistake in the build-up to the late goal from James Vincent that saw the Bairns loss 2–1. After the match, manager Peter Houston said that McCracken was in tears for letting in the late goal. At the end of the 2014–15 season, he made forty–one appearances and scoring five times in all competitions.

At the start of the 2015–16 season, McCracken found himself placed on the substitute bench despite being fit. He made his first appearance of the season, starting the whole game as captain, in a 5–3 win against Peterhead in the last 16 of the Scottish Challenge Cup. In the second half of the season, McCracken soon won his first team place, as well as, retaining his captaincy. On 15 February 2016 he scored his first goal of the season in a 2–2 draw against Raith Rovers. In a match against Hibernian on 12 April 2016, McCracken scored his second goal of the season, having earlier made two mistakes that led to goals, in a 2–2 draw. He captained in both legs in the Premiership play-offs semi–finals against Hibernian, as Falkirk won 5–4 on aggregate. McCracken captained both legs in the Premiership play-offs final against Kilmarnock, as the Bairns loss 4–1 on aggregate. At the end of the 2015–16 season, he made twenty–six appearances and scoring two times in all competitions. For his performance, McCracken signed a contract extension with Falkirk.

In the first half of the 2016–17 season, McCracken regained his first team place, as well as, retaining his captaincy. He then scored his first goal of the season, in a 1–0 win against Elgin City in the third round of the Scottish Challenge Cup. However, McCracken suffered a back spasm that saw him out for the rest of the 2016–17 season. At the end of the 2016–17 season, he made eighteen appearances and scoring once in all competitions. Following this, McCracken was released by Falkirk.

=== Peterhead ===
On 2 July 2017, McCracken signed for Peterhead.

He made his debut for the club as captain, starting the whole game, in a 1–0 win against East Fife in the Scottish League Cup. McCracken then scored his first goal for East Fife, in a 3–0 win against Elgin City in the Scottish League Cup, followed up by scoring in a 2–1 win against Annan Athletic in the opening game of the season. However, he suffered an injury that saw him out for four matches. On 30 September 2017 McCracken returned from injury, coming on as 74th-minute substitute in a 2–0 loss against Berwick Rangers. Following his return from injury, he regained his first team place, playing in the centre–back position despite facing injuries along the way. McCracken said his aim was to help Peterhead reach promotion to Scottish League One. He then scored his third goal for the club, in a 3–2 win against Berwick Rangers on 30 January 2018. In the semi–finals of the first leg play–offs against Stirling Albion, McCracken suffered a calf injury and was substituted in the 50th minute, as the club won 1–0. After missing one match, he returned to the starting line–up, in a 2–0 loss against Stenhousemuir in the first leg of the play–offs final. However, in what turns out to be his last professional football match, McCracken received a red card for a second bookable, as Peterhead was unable to overturn the deficit in a 2–1 loss on aggregate despite winning the match. At the end of the 2017–18 season, he made forty appearances and scoring three times in all competitions.

However, McCracken made no appearances throughout the 2018–19 season and focused on coaching at Peterhead. By this point, he retired from professional football.

== International career ==
In October 2001, McCracken was called up to the Scotland U21 squad for the first time. He made his debut for the under-21 side, starting the whole game, in a 1–0 win over Latvia on 5 October 2001. Two years later, McCracken was called up to the Scotland U21 squad and was featured as an unused substitute twice. He finally made his first appearance for the under-21 side, in a 3–1 loss against Norway U21 on 19 August 2003. McCracken played in both legs of the UEFA European Under-21 Championship qualification play-offs against Croatia U21, as Scotland U21 loss 2–1 on aggregate. He went on to make five appearances for the under-21 side.

== Coaching career ==
During his time with Peterhead, McCracken took on coaching responsibilities.

McCracken left Peterhead in November 2019 to take a coaching position at Falkirk, working with Lee Miller. Their first match as Bairns manager came on 30 November 2019, in a 3–1 win against Stranraer. After a few games in interim charge of the team, McCracken and Miller were given control until the end of the 2019–20 season. They embarked a three match winning streak throughout January that saw them earn January’s Manager of the Month. However, the season was curtailed because of the COVID-19 pandemic, with Falkirk finishing fourth place. By then, McCracken and Miller were able to invigorated the place and the team, only losing twice for the Bairns. On 3 April 2020, Falkirk announced that both managers were among the staff members to be placed on furlough leave.

At the start of the 2020–21 season, McCracken and Millar made ten signings for Falkirk to build the new squad, as they maintained the Bairns’ unbeaten start in the first eight league matches to the season. As a result, McCracken and Millar were named November’s Manager of the Month. They, once again, were named March’s Manager of the Month after going on a three match unbeaten run. However, their joy were short–lived when McCracken and Miller were sacked by Falkirk on 21 April 2021. It came after when the Bairns loss three times, including a 1–0 "embarrassing" defeat against Peterhead.

== Personal life ==
McCracken is married and together, they have one daughter. Outside of football, he’s a qualified Metafit Instructor.

After being sacked as a manager of Falkirk, McCracken became a Wellbeing Development Officer with PFA Scotland.

== Career statistics ==
=== Club ===
Appearances and goals by club, season and competition
Club	Season	League			National cup		League cup		Other		Total	
Club	Season	Division	Apps	Goals	Apps	Goals	Apps	Goals	Apps	Goals	Apps	Goals
Dundee United	1999–2000	Scottish Premier League	2	0	0	0	0	0	—		2	0
Dundee United	2000–01	Scottish Premier League	9	1	0	0	0	0	—		9	1
Dundee United	2001–02	Scottish Premier League	19	0	2	0	3	0	—		24	0
Dundee United	2002–03	Scottish Premier League	25	1	1	0	4	0	—		30	1
Dundee United	2003–04	Scottish Premier League	32	1	1	0	1	0	—		34	1
Dundee United	2004–05	Scottish Premier League	25	2	2	0	4	0	—		31	2
Dundee United	2005–06	Scottish Premier League	34	2	1	0	1	0	1 (Note: Appearance in the UEFA Cup)	0	37	2
Dundee United	2006–07	Scottish Premier League	33	1	2	0	1	0	—		36	1
Dundee United	Total		179	8	9	0	14	0	1	0	203	8
Wycombe Wanderers	2007–08	League Two	37	1	1	0	1	0	1 (Note: Appearances in the Football League Trophy)	0	40	1
Wycombe Wanderers	2008–09	League Two	39	1	2	0	0	0	1	0	42	1
Wycombe Wanderers	Total		76	2	3	0	1	0	2	0	82	2
MK Dons	2009–10	League One	41	1	2	0	1	0	4	0	48	1
Brentford	2010–11	League One	2	0	0	0	0	0	1	0	3	0
Bristol Rovers (loan)	2010–11	League One	10	0	0	0	0	0	0	0	10	0
St Johnstone	2011–12	Scottish Premier League	28	1	3	0	1	0	—		32	1
St Johnstone	2012–13	Scottish Premier League	16	0	2	1	2	0	2 (Note: Appearances in the UEFA Europa League)	0	22	1
St Johnstone	Total		44	1	5	1	3	0	2	0	54	2
Falkirk	2013–14	Scottish Championship	25	2	1	0	0	0	3 (Note: Appearances in the Premiership play-offs)	0	29	2
Falkirk	2014–15	Scottish Championship	32	4	4	1	2	0	3 (Note: Appearances in the Scottish Challenge Cup)	0	41	5
Falkirk	2015–16	Scottish Championship	21	2	1	0	0	0	4 (Note: One appearance in the Scottish Challenge Cup and three in the Premiership play-offs)	0	26	2
Falkirk	2016–17	Scottish Championship	16	0	1	0	0	0	1	1	18	1
Falkirk	Total		94	8	7	1	2	0	11	1	114	10
Peterhead	2017–18	Scottish League Two	4	1	1	0	3	1	2	0	10	2
Career total			450	21	27	2	24	1	23	1	524	25

== Managerial statistics ==
As of match played 20 April 2021

Managerial record by team and tenure
Team	From	To	Record				
Team	From	To	G	W	D	L	Win %
Falkirk (co-manager)	19 November 2019	21 April 2021	42	22	12	8	52.38

- initially caretaker. Made permanent on 13 December 2019.
- statistics includes the 3–0 forfeit win over Kilmarnock in the Scottish League Cup on Tuesday 6 October 2020.

== Honours ==
Dundee United

- Scottish Cup runner-up: 2004–05

Wycombe Wanderers

- Football League Two third-place promotion: 2008–09

Falkirk

- Scottish Cup runner-up: 2014–15

Individual

- PFA Team of the Year: 2008–09 Football League Two
