= List of Scottish Premier League monthly award winners =

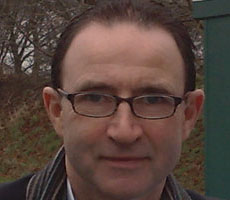
Martin O'Neill won the 'Manager of the Month' award nine times

This article lists the winners of the Manager, Player and Young Player monthly awards in the Scottish Premier League (SPL) from the 2000–01 season until the league ceased operating at the end of the 2012–13 season. The Young Player of the Month began being awarded in the 2001–02 season. The Rising Star awards were issued most months in the 2007–08 season.

The awards were presented by the sponsors of the Scottish Premier League (SPL), the Bank of Scotland from 2000 to 2007 and the Clydesdale Bank from 2007 to 2013.

== 1999–2000 ==
Month	Manager	Player
August		
September		
October	Billy Davies (Motherwell)	Billy Dodds (Dundee United)
November	Billy Davies (Motherwell)	Craig Moore (Rangers)
December		
January	None awarded due to winter break.	
February	Ebbe Skovdahl (Aberdeen)	Paul Bernard (Aberdeen)
March		
April		Billy Dodds (Rangers)
May		

== 2000–01 ==
Month	Manager	Player
August	Martin O'Neill (Celtic)	Andy McLaren (Kilmarnock)
September	Bobby Williamson (Kilmarnock)	Henrik Larsson (Celtic)
October	Alex McLeish (Hibernian)	Mixu Paatelainen (Hibernian)
November	Billy Davies (Motherwell)	Barry Ferguson (Rangers)
December	Martin O'Neill (Celtic)	Barry Ferguson (Rangers)
January	None awarded due to winter break.	
February	Martin O'Neill (Celtic)	Claudio Caniggia (Dundee)
March	Alex Smith (Dundee United)	Neil Lennon (Celtic)
April	Tom Hendrie (St Mirren)	Antti Niemi (Heart of Midlothian)
May	Alex Smith (Dundee United)	Jörg Albertz (Rangers)

== 2001–02 ==
Month	Manager	Player	Young Player
August	Martin O'Neill (Celtic)	Marvin Andrews (Livingston)	Stephen Hughes (Rangers)
September	Jim Leishman (Livingston)	Stiliyan Petrov (Celtic)	Peter MacDonald (St Johnstone)
October	Dick Advocaat (Rangers)	Gavin Rae (Dundee)	Ian Murray (Hibernian)
November	Jim Leishman (Livingston)	Robert Douglas (Celtic)	Kevin McNaughton (Aberdeen)
December	Craig Levein (Heart of Midlothian)	Ricardo Fuller (Heart of Midlothian)	Stephen Murray (Kilmarnock)
January	Alex Smith (Dundee United)	Lorenzo Amoruso (Rangers)	James McFadden (Motherwell)
February	Alex McLeish (Rangers)	Barry Ferguson (Rangers)	Kevin McNaughton (Aberdeen)
March	Jimmy Calderwood (Dunfermline Athletic)	Garry O'Connor (Hibernian)	Stephen Crainey (Celtic)
April	Martin O'Neill (Celtic)	John Hartson (Celtic)	Stuart Duff (Dundee United)

== 2002–03 ==
Month	Manager	Player	Young Player
August	John Lambie (Partick Thistle)	Mark de Vries (Heart of Midlothian)	Kris Boyd (Kilmarnock)
September	Alex McLeish (Rangers)	Jean-Louis Valois (Heart of Midlothian)	Mikel Arteta (Rangers)
October	Bobby Williamson (Hibernian)	Fernando Ricksen (Rangers)	Ian Murray (Hibernian)
November	Martin O'Neill (Celtic)	Henrik Larsson (Celtic)	Mark Wilson (Dundee United)
December	Jim Jefferies (Kilmarnock)	John Hartson (Celtic)	Shaun Dillon (Kilmarnock)
January	Jim Duffy (Dundee)	Barry Ferguson (Rangers)	Kris Boyd (Kilmarnock)
February	Alex McLeish (Rangers)	Lee Wilkie (Dundee)	Shaun Maloney (Celtic)
March	Jim Duffy (Dundee)	Thomas McManus (Hibernian)	Zurab Khizanishvili (Dundee)
April	Craig Levein (Heart of Midlothian)	Bobo Balde (Celtic)	Andy Webster (Heart of Midlothian)

== 2003–04 ==
Month	Manager	Player	Young Player
August	Alex McLeish (Rangers)	Michael Ball (Rangers)	Mikel Arteta (Rangers)
September	Alex McLeish (Rangers)	Shota Arveladze (Rangers)	Zurab Khizanishvili (Rangers)
October	Martin O'Neill (Celtic)	Roddy McKenzie (Livingston)	Liam Miller (Celtic)
November	Martin O'Neill (Celtic)	Chris Sutton (Celtic)	Stephen Hughes (Rangers)
December	Steve Paterson (Aberdeen)	Craig Brewster (Dunfermline Athletic)	Craig Gordon (Heart of Midlothian)
January	Jim Duffy (Dundee)	Stiliyan Petrov (Celtic)	David Clarkson (Motherwell)
February	Terry Butcher (Motherwell)	Steven Pressley (Heart of Midlothian)	Alexander Diamond (Aberdeen)
March	Ian McCall (Dundee United)	Neil Lennon (Celtic)	David Marshall (Celtic)
April	Jimmy Calderwood (Dunfermline Athletic)	Barry Nicholson (Dunfermline Athletic)	Derek Riordan (Hibernian)

== 2004–05 ==
Month	Manager	Player	Young Player
August	Jimmy Calderwood (Aberdeen)	Alan Thompson (Celtic)	Alexander Diamond (Aberdeen)
September	Terry Butcher (Motherwell)	Scott McDonald (Motherwell)	Derek Riordan (Hibernian)
October	John Robertson (Inverness Caledonian Thistle)	Fernando Ricksen (Rangers)	Steven Fletcher (Hibernian)
November	Alex McLeish (Rangers)	Nacho Novo (Rangers)	Derek Riordan (Hibernian)
December	Tony Mowbray (Hibernian)	Aiden McGeady (Celtic)	Derek Riordan (Hibernian)
January	Martin O'Neill (Celtic)	Chris Sutton (Celtic)	Derek Riordan (Hibernian)
February	Alex McLeish (Rangers)	Dado Pršo (Rangers)	Lee Miller (Heart of Midlothian)
March	Craig Brewster (Inverness Caledonian Thistle)	Craig Bellamy (Celtic)	Aiden McGeady (Celtic)
April	Gordon Chisholm (Dundee United)	Burton O'Brien (Livingston)	Lee Miller (Heart of Midlothian)
May	Tony Mowbray (Hibernian)	Dado Pršo (Rangers)	Derek Riordan (Hibernian)

== 2005–06 ==
Month	Manager	Player	Young Player
August	George Burley (Heart of Midlothian)	Rudolf Skácel (Heart of Midlothian)	Steven Naismith (Kilmarnock)
September	George Burley (Heart of Midlothian)	Andy Webster (Heart of Midlothian)	Kevin Thomson (Hibernian)
October	Gordon Strachan (Celtic)	Stiliyan Petrov (Celtic)	Darryl Duffy (Falkirk)
November	Tony Mowbray (Hibernian)	Kris Boyd (Kilmarnock)	Aiden McGeady (Celtic)
December	Craig Brewster (Inverness Caledonian Thistle)	Peter Løvenkrands (Rangers)	Calum Elliot (Heart of Midlothian)
January	Alex McLeish (Rangers)	Kris Boyd (Rangers)	Steven Naismith (Kilmarnock)
February	Jimmy Calderwood (Aberdeen)	Maciej Żurawski (Celtic)	Charlie Mulgrew (Dundee United)
March	Terry Butcher (Motherwell)	Steven Naismith (Kilmarnock)	Brian McLean (Motherwell)
April	Jimmy Calderwood (Aberdeen)	Paul Hartley (Heart of Midlothian)	Steven Smith (Rangers)

== 2006–07 ==
Month	Manager	Player	Young Player
August	Jim Jefferies (Kilmarnock)	Russell Latapy (Falkirk)	Aiden McGeady (Celtic)
September	Gordon Strachan (Celtic)	Allan McGregor (Rangers)	Aiden McGeady (Celtic)
October	Charlie Christie (Inverness Caledonian Thistle)	Lee Naylor (Celtic)	Anthony Stokes (Falkirk)
November	Craig Levein (Dundee United)	Russell Anderson (Aberdeen)	Anthony Stokes (Falkirk)
December	John Hughes (Falkirk)	Artur Boruc (Celtic)	Darren Barr (Falkirk)
January	Gordon Strachan (Celtic)	Jan Vennegoor of Hesselink (Celtic)	Christophe Berra (Heart of Midlothian)
February	Maurice Malpas (Motherwell)	Shunsuke Nakamura (Celtic)	Lewis Stevenson (Hibernian)
March	Craig Levein (Dundee United)	Alan Hutton (Rangers)	Steven Naismith (Kilmarnock)
April	Stephen Kenny (Dunfermline Athletic)	Neil Lennon (Celtic)	Mark Reynolds (Motherwell)

== 2007–08 ==
Month	Manager	Player	Young Player	Rising Star
August	Walter Smith (Rangers)	Carlos Cuéllar (Rangers)	Steven Fletcher (Hibernian)	Mark Staunton (Falkirk)
September	John Collins (Hibernian)	Scott McDonald (Celtic)	Andrew Driver (Heart of Midlothian)	Scott Anson (Kilmarnock)
October	Craig Levein (Dundee United)	Lee Wilkie (Dundee United)	Ross McCormack (Motherwell)	Jack Wilson (Hibernian)
November	Mark McGhee (Motherwell)	Aiden McGeady (Celtic)	Ross McCormack (Motherwell)	Liam Cusack (Gretna)
December	Craig Brewster (Inverness Caledonian Thistle)	Marius Niculae (Inverness Caledonian Thistle)	Scott Arfield (Falkirk)	—
January	Walter Smith (Rangers)	Barry Robson (Dundee United)	Danny Grainger (Dundee United)	—
February	Mixu Paatelainen (Hibernian)	Aiden McGeady (Celtic)	Steven Fletcher (Hibernian)	Ryan Strachan (Aberdeen)
March	Walter Smith (Rangers)	Darren Barr (Falkirk)	Garry Kenneth (Dundee United)	Sean Crighton (St Mirren)
April	Gordon Strachan (Celtic)	Barry Robson (Celtic)	Gary Glen (Heart of Midlothian)	—

== 2008–09 ==
Month	Manager	Player	Young Player
August	Jim Jefferies (Kilmarnock)	Pedro Mendes (Rangers)	James McArthur (Hamilton Academical)
September	Gordon Strachan (Celtic)	Georgios Samaras (Celtic)	Scott Arfield (Falkirk)
October	Gus MacPherson (St Mirren)	Scott Brown (Celtic)	Steven Fletcher (Hibernian)
November	Gordon Strachan (Celtic)	Bruno Aguiar (Heart of Midlothian)	Sone Aluko (Aberdeen)
December	Gus MacPherson (St Mirren)	Lee Miller (Aberdeen)	James McCarthy (Hamilton Academical)
January	Billy Reid (Hamilton Academical)	Tomas Cerny (Hamilton Academical)	James McCarthy (Hamilton Academical)
February	Mark McGhee (Motherwell)	Andy Dorman (St Mirren)	Lee Wallace (Heart of Midlothian)
March	Mixu Paatelainen (Hibernian)	Scott McDonald (Celtic)	Steven Fletcher (Hibernian)
April	Walter Smith (Rangers)	Andy Dorman (St Mirren)	Calum Elliot (Heart of Midlothian)

=== Rising Star award ===
- August 2008: Shane Sutherland (Inverness CT)
- September 2008: Ryan Dow (Dundee United)
- October 2008: Gregg Wylde (Rangers)
- November 2008: Ben Carson (St Mirren)
- December 2008: James McCarthy (Hamilton Academical)
- February 2009: Craig Thomson (Heart of Midlothian)

== 2009–10 ==
Month	Manager	Player	Young Player
August	Tony Mowbray (Celtic)	Danny Cadamarteri (Dundee United)	Ross Forbes (Motherwell)
September	John Hughes (Hibernian)	Derek Riordan (Hibernian)	Craig Thomson (Heart of Midlothian)
October	Jim Gannon (Motherwell)	Liam Miller (Hibernian)	Lukas Jutkiewicz (Motherwell)
November	Craig Levein (Dundee United)	Andy Webster (Dundee United)	Peter Pawlett (Aberdeen)
December	Walter Smith (Rangers)	Kris Boyd (Rangers)	Anthony Stokes (Hibernian)
January	Craig Brown (Motherwell)	Steven Davis (Rangers)	Fraser Fyvie (Aberdeen)
February	Craig Brown (Motherwell)	David Weir (Rangers)	Chris Maguire (Kilmarnock)
March	Peter Houston (Dundee United)	Robbie Keane (Celtic)	Ryan Flynn (Falkirk)
April	Billy Reid (Hamilton Academical)	Kenny Miller (Rangers)	Graham Carey (St Mirren)

== 2010–11 ==
Month	Manager	Player	Young Player
August	Walter Smith (Rangers)	Kenny Miller (Rangers)	James Forrest (Celtic)
September	Neil Lennon (Celtic)	Kenny Miller (Rangers)	Chris Maguire (Aberdeen)
October	Terry Butcher (Inverness Caledonian Thistle)	Steven Naismith (Rangers)	Ki Sung-Yueng (Celtic)
November	Jim Jefferies (Heart of Midlothian)	Alexei Eremenko (Kilmarnock)	David Templeton (Heart of Midlothian)
December	Mixu Paatelainen (Kilmarnock)	Marius Zaliukas (Heart of Midlothian)	David Templeton (Heart of Midlothian)
January	Neil Lennon (Celtic)	Beram Kayal (Celtic)	Jamie Ness (Rangers)
February	Colin Calderwood (Hibernian)	Marian Kello (Heart of Midlothian)	Callum Booth (Hibernian)
March	Peter Houston (Dundee United)	David Goodwillie (Dundee United)	Johnny Russell (Dundee United)
April	Neil Lennon (Celtic)	Allan McGregor (Rangers)	Jamie Murphy (Motherwell)

=== Rising Star award ===
- December 2010: David Crawford

== 2011–12 ==
Month	Manager	Player	Young Player
July / August	Stuart McCall (Motherwell)	Paul Gallacher (Dunfermline Athletic)	Johnny Russell (Dundee United)
September	Ally McCoist (Rangers)	Steven Davis (Rangers)	James Forrest (Celtic)
October	Stuart McCall (Motherwell)	Keith Lasley (Motherwell)	Kenny McLean (St Mirren)
November	Neil Lennon (Celtic)	Gary Hooper (Celtic)	James Forrest (Celtic)
December	Neil Lennon (Celtic)	Paul McGowan (St Mirren)	Victor Wanyama (Celtic)
January	Craig Brown (Aberdeen)	Scott Brown (Celtic)	Henrik Ojamaa (Motherwell)
February	Neil Lennon (Celtic)	Charlie Mulgrew (Celtic)	Gary Mackay-Steven (Dundee United)
March	Peter Houston (Dundee United)	Jon Daly (Dundee United)	Gary Mackay-Steven (Dundee United)
April	Neil Lennon (Celtic)	Charlie Mulgrew (Celtic)	Shaun Hutchinson (Motherwell)

== 2012–13 ==
Month	Manager	Player	Young Player
August	Derek Adams (Ross County)	Leigh Griffiths (Hibernian)	Tony Watt (Celtic)
September	Steve Lomas (St Johnstone)	Michael Higdon (Motherwell)	Ryan Fraser (Aberdeen)
October	Craig Brown (Aberdeen)	Niall McGinn (Aberdeen)	Ryan Fraser (Aberdeen)
November	Terry Butcher (Inverness Caledonian Thistle)	Billy McKay (Inverness Caledonian Thistle)	Aaron Doran (Inverness Caledonian Thistle)
December	Neil Lennon (Celtic)	Jamie Murphy (Motherwell)	Joe Shaughnessy (Aberdeen)
January	Derek Adams (Ross County)	Gary Hooper (Celtic)	Adam Matthews (Celtic)
February	Derek Adams (Ross County)	Leigh Griffiths (Hibernian)	Stuart Armstrong (Dundee United)
March	Stuart McCall (Motherwell)	Nicky Law (Motherwell)	Josh Meekings (Inverness Caledonian Thistle)
April	John Brown (Dundee)	Michael Higdon (Motherwell)	Henrik Ojamaa (Motherwell)

== See also ==
- Scottish Football League monthly awards
- Scottish Premier League Yearly Awards
- Scottish Professional Football League monthly awards
