= Mark Wilson (Scottish footballer) =

Scottish footballer and coach

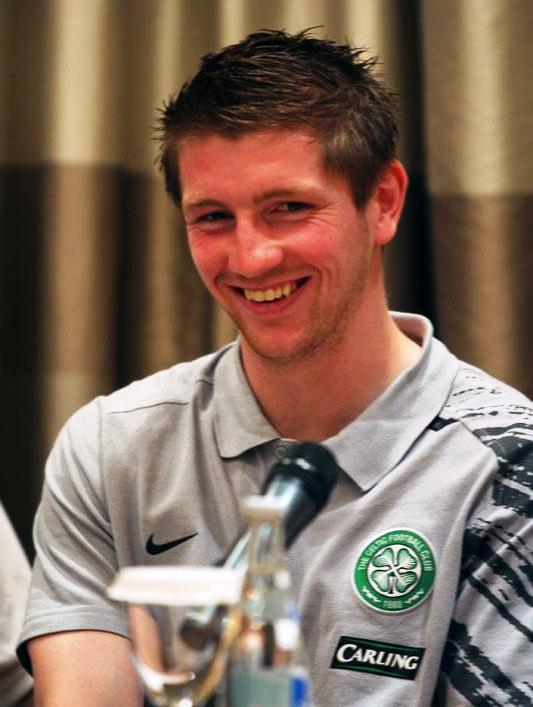
- Wilson with Celtic in 2007

Personal information
- Full name: Mark Wilson
- Date of birth: 5 June 1984 (age 42)
- Place of birth: Glasgow, Scotland
- Height: 5 ft 10 in (1.78 m)
- Position: Right-back

Team information
- Current team: Partick Thistle (Head Coach)

Youth career
- 2000–2002: Dundee United

Senior career*
Years	Team	Apps	(Gls)
2002–2006	Dundee United	117	(8)
2006–2012	Celtic	98	(2)
2012–2013	Bristol City	8	(0)
2013–2015	Dundee United	14	(0)
2015	Dumbarton	11	(1)
Total		248	(11)

International career
2004–2006	Scotland U21	19	(0)
2011	Scotland	1	(0)
2005	Scotland B	1	(0)

Managerial career
- 2016–2017: Airdrieonians
- 2019–2020: Brechin City
- 2025–: Partick Thistle
- * Club domestic league appearances and goals

Mark Wilson (born 5 June 1984) is a Scottish football coach, pundit and former player. He is currently head coach of Partick Thistle, and works as a pundit on television and radio.

Wilson, who played as a right-back, started his career at Dundee United. He broke into their first team in the 2002–03 season, and made over 100 league appearances for United before He moved to Celtic in January 2006 for a fee of £500,000. Wilson suffered significant injury problems while with Celtic, which limited his appearances, and he was released at the end of his contract in 2012. He then signed for English Championship club Bristol City before rejoining his first club on a short-term contract in 2013. He left Dundee United in January 2015, signing for Dumbarton the following month.

Wilson represented Scotland at all youth levels and captained the under-21 team. He played once for the Scotland national football team, in 2011.

He retired from playing football in 2015. Wilson was the head coach of Scottish League One club Airdrieonians during most of the 2016–17 season. He was appointed Brechin City manager in September 2019, but was sacked in October 2020. Wilson became head coach of Partick Thistle in 2025.

== Early life ==
Mark Wilson was born in Glasgow on 5 June 1984. He attended St Ambrose High School in Coatbridge.

== Club career ==
=== Dundee United ===
Wilson started his career with Dundee United. He joined as a youth player, turned professional in 2000 and made his senior début in January 2002. Signing a new two-year contract just months later, he began the next season as a regular. Wilson scored his first goal in December 2002, a header opening the scoring in a 1–1 home league draw against Hibernian. Five days later, Wilson was announced as the SPL Young Player of the Month for November, saying it was a "great honour to be given this award". Before the end of that season, Wilson signed a new three-year contract, committing himself to the club until the end of the 2005–06 season.

In November 2004, Wilson was wrongly sent off in the derby match against Dundee, being mistakenly penalised for handball when television evidence showed he headed the ball. However, SFA rules dictated that, despite the error, an appeal could not proceed, as such appeals can only proceed on the basis of violent conduct or mistaken identity. The decision not to overturn the dismissal – the first of Wilson's career – drew criticism from journalists, being dubbed a "huge mistake".

Wilson's international exploits were attracting further attention and after being confirmed in April 2005 as one of the nominees for the SPFA Young Player of the Year award, Manchester City were confirmed as planning a move to sign the defender, just one of "several Premier League club" showing an interest. Despite the renewed interest from England, Wilson confirmed he would like to "stay...for the foreseeable future", and signed a new two-year contract in August 2005, extending his stay until the summer of 2008.

=== Celtic ===
In early January 2006, it emerged that Wolverhampton Wanderers manager Glenn Hoddle had shown interest in Wilson during the summer and Heart of Midlothian had made an "active enquiry", with Celtic and Leeds United also showing an interest in the player who had a £500,000 release clause inserted in his new contract. By the middle of the month, Celtic were rumoured to be close to completing the signing of Wilson and on 16 January, Wilson signed for the club his family had "supported all their life". Signing for £500,000, Wilson received 25% of the fee under the terms of his contract. He made his debut two weeks later, against Dundee United, playing at right-back in the 3–3 home draw. Wilson suffered a number of injuries in his first full season at Celtic: a broken foot, knee injury and subsequent knee operation. He was also cup-tied for Celtic's victory in the 2006 Scottish League Cup Final.

Wilson became more of a regular in the Celtic side under the management of Neil Lennon. On 1 February 2011, he scored his first goal for Celtic in a 3–0 victory against Aberdeen at Pittodrie Stadium. He got his second goal just 12 days later when he put Celtic 2–0 ahead against his former club Dundee United at Tannadice. On 2 March 2011 during the Scottish Cup fifth round replay against Rangers at Celtic Park, Wilson scored the only goal in an ill-tempered Old Firm fixture with Rangers receiving three red cards.

It was reported on 30 January 2012 that Wilson was in talks with Leeds United over a potential loan for the remainder of the 2011–12 season, but no deal materialised. On 3 May, Wilson captained Celtic in their 1–0 win against St Johnstone. After the game it was revealed that Wilson would be leaving the club at the end of the season so had been given the captaincy for his last match.

=== Bristol City ===
Wilson played as a trialist for Bristol City in a pre-season friendly on 30 July 2012. He signed a short-term contract with the club on 16 August.

Wilson was released by Bristol City at the end of the 2012–13 Championship season, along with another defender Matthew Bates.

=== Return to Dundee United ===
On 20 August 2013, it was announced by Dundee United that Wilson had rejoined his first senior club, initially on a short-term contract until January 2014. Wilson previously stated he could not rule out returning to the club, stating that Dundee United is "always in my heart".

After six months with the club, Wilson signed an 18-month contract with the club. On 12 April 2014, he started in the Scottish Cup Semi Final at Ibrox. United beat Rangers 3–1 to progress to the Scottish Cup Final.

On 13 January 2015, Dundee United announced that Wilson was leaving the club, with his contract being terminated by mutual consent.

=== Dumbarton ===
On 12 February 2015, Wilson signed for Dumbarton on a contract until the end of the 2014–15 season.

He scored his first goal for the club in a 3–1 defeat to Rangers with a volley from the edge of the box. He left the club in June 2015.

== International career ==
Wilson appeared over 30 times for his country in youth internationals up to and including under-21 level. He featured in the 2001 UEFA Under-16 Championship. In February 2004, Wilson won the first of his nineteen caps for the Scotland under-21 side, starting in the 2–1 friendly defeat at home to Hungary under-21. Wilson was named in the Scotland Future squad to face Germany B in December 2004. He started the game, which ended in a 3–0 defeat for Scotland.

Wilson believed that his move to Celtic would enhance his chances of selection for the full national side, but these hopes were denied by a succession of injuries that limited his appearances for Celtic. He was selected by Craig Levein for a friendly game against the Faroe Islands in November 2010, but withdrew due to injury.

Wilson was again named in the Scotland squad in February 2011. Wilson won his first international cap when he replaced Phil Bardsley during the Nations Cup match against Northern Ireland.

== Coaching career ==
=== Airdrie ===
After Kevin McBride departed Scottish League One club Airdrieonians, Wilson was then appointed Head coach on 31 October 2016. Wilson was in charge of first-team affairs, working under the Director of football, Gordon Dalziel. His first game in charge resulted in a 2–1 win at Cliftonhill stadium against Albion Rovers. Airdrie finished third in 2016–17 Scottish League One, but were defeated in the promotion playoffs by Alloa Athletic. Wilson left Airdrie in June 2017, by mutual consent.

=== Brechin City ===
On 4 September 2019, Wilson was appointed manager of League Two side Brechin City. Brechin finished last in the curtailed 2019–20 Scottish League Two season, but avoided a relegation playoff as it was cancelled due to the COVID-19 pandemic. Wilson was sacked by Brechin after a bad start to the 2020–21 season.

=== Partick Thistle ===
Wilson worked for Partick Thistle as an under-18 coach, and in February 2025 he was made interim manager of the first team alongside club captain Brian Graham.

On 30 May 2025, Wilson was appointed head coach on a permanent basis.

In Wilson's first game in permanent charge he guided Thistle to a 4–1 away victory over Edinburgh City in the Scottish League Cup group stages.

== Career statistics ==
=== Player ===
Appearances and goals by club, season and competition
Club	Season	League			National cup		League cup		Continental		Total
Club	Season	Apps	Goals	Apps	Goals	Apps	Goals	Apps	Goals	Apps	Goals
Dundee United	2001–02	1	0	1	0	0	0	0	0	2	0
Dundee United	2002–03	26	1	1	0	4	0	0	0	31	1
Dundee United	2003–04	32	3	1	0	1	0	0	0	34	3
Dundee United	2004–05	37	4	5	2	4	1	0	0	46	7
Dundee United	2005–06	21	0	1	0	1	0	2	0	25	0
Dundee United	Total	117	8	9	2	10	1	2	0	138	11
Celtic	2005–06	15	0	0	0	0	0	0	0	15	0
Celtic	2006–07	12	0	1	0	0	0	3	0	16	0
Celtic	2007–08	11	0	0	0	0	0	5	0	16	0
Celtic	2008–09	18	0	0	0	2	0	5	0	25	0
Celtic	2009–10	10	0	1	0	1	0	3	0	15	0
Celtic	2010–11	25	2	5	1	3	0	0	0	33	3
Celtic	2011–12	7	0	0	0	1	0	3	0	11	0
Celtic	Total	98	2	7	1	7	0	19	0	131	3
Bristol City	2012–13	8	0	1	0	0	0	0	0	9	0
Dundee United	2013–14	14	0	3	0	2	0	0	0	19	0
Dundee United	2014–15	0	0	0	0	0	0	0	0	0	0
Dundee United	Total	14	0	3	0	2	0	0	0	19	0
Dumbarton	2014–15	11	1	0	0	0	0	0	0	11	1
Career total		248	11	20	3	19	1	21	0	308	15

=== Manager ===
As of match played 21 November 2026

Team	From	To	Record				
Team	From	To	G	W	D	L	Win %
Airdrieonians	October 2016	June 2017	28	12	2	14	42.86
Brechin City	September 2019	October 2020	29	3	6	20	10.34
Partick Thistle (co-interim)	18 February 2025	16 May 2025	15	6	4	5	40.00
Partick Thistle	30 May 2025	Present	74	40	24	10	54.05
Total			146	61	36	49	41.78

- Wilson was initially a caretaker co-manager, working alongside Brian Graham, during his spell at Partick Thistle. He was appointed on a permanent basis on 30 May 2025.

== Honours ==
Dundee United

- Scottish Cup runner-up 2005, 2014

Celtic

- Scottish Premier League: 2005–06, 2006–07, 2007–08, 2011–12
- Scottish League Cup: 2009
- Scottish Cup: 2011

Scotland Youth

- Victory Shield: 1998–99

Individual

- SPL Young Player of the Month: November 2002
