= Daniele Chiarini =

Italian footballer (born 1979)

Personal information
- Full name: Daniele Chiarini
- Date of birth: April 11, 1979 (age 47)
- Place of birth: Bibbiena, Italy
- Height: 1.77 m (5 ft 10 in)
- Position: Defender

Team information
- Current team: Sangiovannese

Senior career*
Years	Team	Apps	(Gls)
1996–1997	Fiorentina	1	(0)
1997–1998	Arezzo	10	(0)
1998–1999	Udinese	0	(0)
1999–2000	Montevarchi	8	(0)
2000–2002	Faenza	63	(1)
2002–2003	Dundee United	4	(0)
2003–2004	Partick Thistle	18	(0)
2004–2005	Martina	11	(0)
2005–2006	Arezzo	7	(0)
2006–2007	Pisa	29	(1)
2008	Lucchese	9	(0)
2009–	Sangiovannese	43	(3)
- * Club domestic league appearances and goals as of 19 February 2011

Daniele Chiarini (born April 11, 1979) is an Italian former footballer who played as a defender for Sangiovannese.

== Career ==
Chiarini began his career in Serie A with Fiorentina but made just one appearance and moved to Udinese in 1997. Chiarini spent part of his first season on loan to Arezzo, making ten appearances, and when he failed to make an Udinese appearance after two years with the club, moved to Montevarchi. A move in 2000 to Faenza followed, where he played over sixty games in two season, netting his first career goal. In 2002, Chiarini moved to Scotland with Partick Thistle and impressed enough in a short-term deal to win a move to Dundee United. After just four games for United, Chiarini fell out of favour with new manager Ian McCall and ended up back at Partick in 2004, where he played six times. The following season, he moved back to Italy with Martina, where he spent a year, followed by a year with former club Arezzo. Chiarini signed for Pisa in 2006. After a move to Lucchese in 2008, he signed for Sangiovannese in 2009.
