= Stephen McGowan (footballer) =

Scottish footballer

Personal information
- Full name: Stephen McGowan
- Date of birth: 24 September 1984 (age 42)
- Place of birth: Glasgow, Scotland
- Position: Striker

Team information
- Current team: Neilston

Youth career
- 2000–2001: Dundee United

Senior career*
Years	Team	Apps	(Gls)
2001–2004	Dundee United	1	(0)
2003	→ Ross County (loan)		
2006–2007	Maryhill		
2007	Irvine Meadow		
2007–	Neilston		

International career
2001	Scotland U16	4	(1)
2001	Scotland U18	1	(0)
- * Club domestic league appearances and goals

Stephen McGowan (born 24 September 1984) is a Scottish footballer who plays as a striker for junior side Neilston.

== Career ==
McGowan was a product of Dundee United's youth development programme and made his only appearance in the final game of the 2002–03 season. A loan spell with Ross County followed, before McGowan was released in February 2004, alongside fellow striker Danny Ogunmade. After a few seasons in U21 football, McGowan moved to Maryhill in 2006. He signed for Irvine Meadow XI a year later then moved once more, this time to Neilston, in September 2007.

McGowan appeared at under-16 and under-18 level for Scotland, featuring in the 2001 UEFA under-16 Championship.

== See also ==
- 2002–03 Dundee United F.C. season
