= Charlie Miller =

Scottish footballer

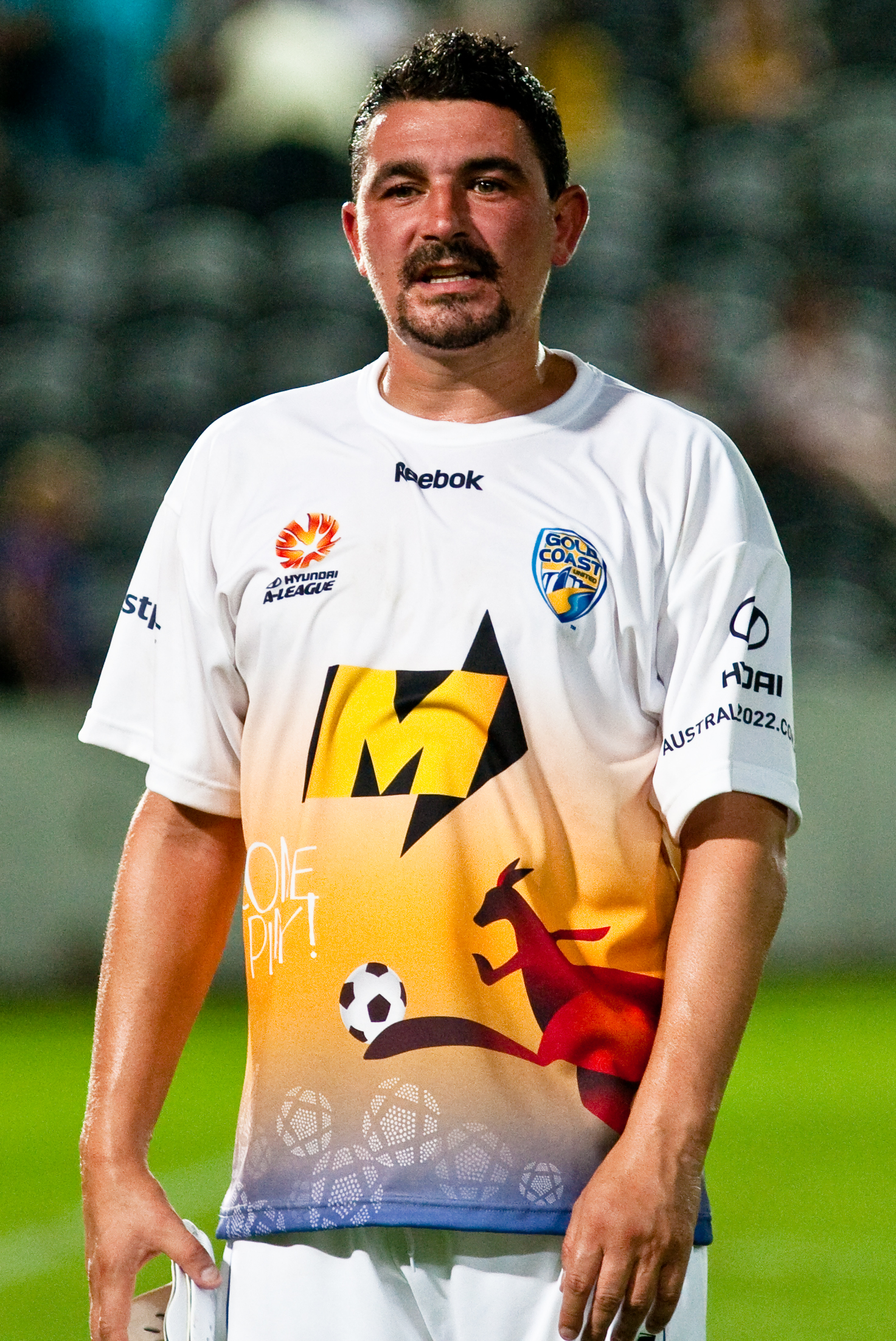
- Miller playing for Gold Coast United in 2010

Personal information
- Full name: Charles Miller
- Date of birth: 18 March 1976 (age 50)
- Place of birth: Glasgow, Scotland
- Position: Attacking midfielder

Youth career
- 1985–1991: Rangers SABC
- 1991–1994: Rangers

Senior career*
Years	Team	Apps	(Gls)
1993–1999	Rangers	81	(10)
1999	→ Leicester City (loan)	4	(0)
1999–2000	Watford	14	(0)
2000–2004	Dundee United	118	(17)
2004–2006	SK Brann	52	(14)
2007–2008	Lierse	33	(12)
2008–2009	Brisbane Roar	30	(8)
2009–2010	Gold Coast United	12	(1)
2011	Clyde	5	(0)
Total		351	(62)

International career
1994–1996	Scotland U21	8	(1)
2001	Scotland	1	(0)
- * Club domestic league appearances and goals

Charles Miller (born 18 March 1976) is a Scottish retired footballer. He started his career at Rangers, and was voted the SPFA Young Player of the Year in 1995 during his time with the club. After spells with English Premier League clubs Leicester City and Watford, Miller joined Dundee United in 2000 where he played for four seasons.

Miller played for Norwegian club SK Brann from 2004 to 2006 and won the Norwegian Cup with the club in 2004. After spells in Belgium and Australia, he returned to Scotland in 2011 when he joined Clyde.

== Club career ==
=== Early life ===
Miller was born in Glasgow and raised in the Castlemilk district of the city; he was brought up by his mother and has never met his father. He attended Castlemilk High School before leaving early to join the staff at Rangers, having been on a youth contract with the club since the age of 11. He had been introduced to football by his two uncles, one of whom supported Rangers and the other Celtic; Miller has stated that he attended games of both clubs as a child and had no particular affection for either until he started to play regularly for Rangers' affiliated boys club.

=== Rangers ===
Miller made his senior debut in 1993 aged just 17, and showed he was talented enough to make an impression in the nine-in-a-row team under Walter Smith, winning three Scottish Premier Division titles between 1995 and 1997 (providing the cross for Brian Laudrup to score the championship-clinching goal in the latter), as well as lifting the Scottish League Cup in 1996 and starting matches in the UEFA Champions League against the likes of Juventus, Borussia Dortmund and Ajax, all by the age of 21. When David Beckham scored his famous goal from the halfway line against Wimbledon on 17 August 1996, he did so in boots custom-made for Miller ("CHARLIE" was embroidered on the boots), which had been given to Beckham by mistake.

However, a lifestyle of parties and an unhealthy diet (with both his old Castlemilk pals and others such as teammate Paul Gascoigne's entourage) accompanied this early success, even after he made attempts to start afresh by moving with his partner to Rutherglen where their daughter was born in 1994, and his career appeared to be on the wane. In 1996, after playing in an Old Firm match earlier the same day, Miller engaged in a pub brawl after allegedly singing sectarian songs. His accomplice, Jimmy Gardner, was convicted of assault in relation to the incident, while a verdict of not proven was recorded against Miller.

=== England and Dundee United ===
Having fallen out of favour at Ibrox with the emerging Barry Ferguson being preferred in midfield, Miller was loaned to Leicester City towards the end of the 1998–99 season (having played enough matches for Rangers to receive a fourth league winner's medal) before joining Watford for £450,000 in October 1999. Watford were relegated in their first FA Premier League season with Miller unable to make an impact, making only 14 league appearances. He played one more League Cup game for the Hornets in the 2000–01 season before moving to Dundee United on a free transfer, alongside Beto Naveda.

Miller enjoyed a successful four-year spell at Tannadice, becoming a firm favourite with the fans and making his international debut, but also losing two cup semi-finals to Celtic (2000–01 Scottish Cup and 2002–03 Scottish League Cup). Away from the pitch, an existing addiction to sports betting worsened, requiring him to attend Gamblers Anonymous meetings. In May 2004, a contract dispute saw Miller leave the club to join ex-United player Robbie Winters at Norwegian club SK Brann. He made 135 appearances for Dundee United in all competitions, which would be his highest total for a single club during his career.

=== Brann and Lierse ===
In Bergen, Miller became one of the supporters' favourite players, due to his technique and passing ability. Despite this, he was in and out of the team, according to manager Mons Ivar Mjelde because of defensive considerations. He had early success with the club in the 2004 Norwegian Football Cup Final, a 4–1 win over Lyn, coming on as a late substitute for Winters who had scored one of the goals. He played regularly in 2005, although the club finished only mid-table, and in 2006 he started off as one of the league's top players, but gradually received some attention off the pitch, apparently provoked by lack of confidence from the manager. He made it clear that he was unhappy as a right midfielder, the position he had played in most of the season, and eventually that he wanted to leave the club. Miller also criticised Mjelde's unusually close ties to his rival for the attacking central midfield spot, Martin Andresen. Miller refused to participate in the silver medal ceremony after the game against Ham-Kam on 29 October, following which he was ignored by the coach, and only played the last minute of Brann's Royal League match against Rosenborg on 7 December 2006, in which he contributed to the winning goal scored by Trond Fredrik Ludvigsen.

During his time at Brann he went on trial at English Championship club Cardiff City, but was not offered a full deal. In early January 2007, Miller began training with Scottish First Division club St Johnstone to top up his fitness during the Norwegian league's winter break. His contract with SK Brann was terminated after an agreement on 31 January.

On 9 February 2007, Miller signed a contract at the Belgian team Lierse S.K. On 20 April, he scored his first goals for Lierse against Germinal Beerschot in their (ultimately unsuccessful) fight to stay in the first division. On 27 June he signed a three-year contract with Lierse but was released less than a year later with the club having failed to gain promotion.

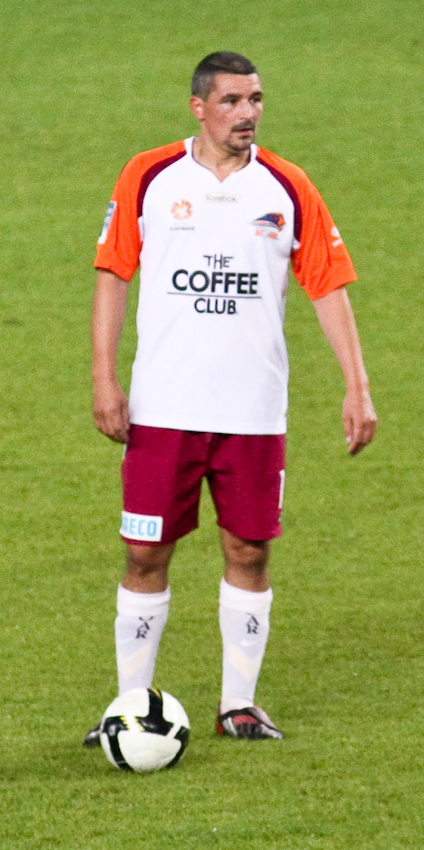
Miller playing for Brisbane Roar

=== Brisbane Roar ===
On 31 July 2008, Miller officially signed a two-year deal with Australian A-League club, Brisbane Roar. On 14 September, against Perth Glory, Miller broke the A-League scoring record for the best start to a season by scoring four goals in the Roar's opening four fixtures of the 2008–09 season.

He was diagnosed with a hernia and underwent surgery. Miller returned to the first team on 17 January 2009 as a substitute against Sydney FC coming on late in the game, and made the pass that set up Sergio van Dijk's third goal of the match. On 5 December 2009, Miller's contract with the Roar was terminated by mutual consent in the middle of the 2009–10 season as the club could not guarantee Miller a contract for the 2010–11 season.

=== Gold Coast United ===
After leaving the Roar, Miller was linked with a move to Queensland rivals, North Queensland Fury FC and Gold Coast United. On 5 December 2009 he was a guest at a Gold Coast United fixture sparking rumors of a potential move. Miller signed with Gold Coast on a short-term injury replacement contract. While in Australia, he also had to declare himself bankrupt after an electronics business venture ran into difficulty.

=== Return to Scotland ===
It was reported on 12 November 2010 that Miller would spend the week training with Scottish Second Division club Ayr United. In February 2011, he signed for Clyde until the end of the season. He was released at the end of the season, after only making 5 appearances. After retiring from professional football, he began operating a youth football academy program in Castlemilk as well as playing in a local amateur team alongside Andy McLaren.

== International career ==
Miller won his sole cap for Scotland in a 1–1 draw with Poland in 2001. Steven Caldwell, Kenny Miller, Barry Nicholson, Gavin Rae, John O'Neil and Andy McLaren (the latter a childhood friend of Miller from Castlemilk) also made their Scotland debuts in the same game. Scotland manager Craig Brown stated that 'Charlie Miller has always been a talented player and now I think his club manager Alex Smith has got the best out of him and this is a new challenge for him'. Brown resigned as Scotland boss later in 2001 after failing to qualify for the 2002 World Cup and Miller was overlooked by Brown's successor Berti Vogts. Scotland captain Barry Ferguson stated that Miller 'should be in the Scotland team', but Vogts did not take his advice.

== Career statistics ==
Appearances and goals by club, season and competition
Club	Season	League			National cup (Note: Includes Scottish Cup, FA Cup)		League cup (Note: Includes Scottish League Cup, League Cup, A-League Pre-Season Challenge Cup)		Continental		Other		Total	
Club	Season	Division	Apps	Goals	Apps	Goals	Apps	Goals	Apps	Goals	Apps	Goals	Apps	Goals
Rangers	1993–94	Scottish Premier Division	3	0	0	0	0	0	0	0	—		3	0
Rangers	1994–95	Scottish Premier Division	21	3	2	0	0	0	0	0	—		23	3
Rangers	1995–96	Scottish Premier Division	23	3	3	3	3	0	7 (Note: Appearances in the UEFA Champions League)	0	—		36	6
Rangers	1996–97	Scottish Premier Division	13	1	0	0	3	0	5	1	—		21	2
Rangers	1997–98	Scottish Premier Division	7	0	0	0	3	0	3 (Note: One appearance and one goal in UEFA Champions League, two appearances in UEFA Cup)	1	—		13	1
Rangers	1998–99	Scottish Premier League	14	3	2	0	2	1	2 (Note: Appearances in UEFA Cup)	0	—		20	4
Rangers	Total		81	10	7	3	11	1	17	2	0	0	116	16
Leicester City (loan)	1998–99	Premier League	4	0	0	0	0	0	—		—		4	0
Watford	1999–2000	Premier League	14	0	1	0	1	0	—		—		16	0
Watford	2000–01	First Division	0	0	0	0	1	0	—		—		1	0
Watford	Total		14	0	1	0	2	0	0	0	0	0	17	0
Dundee United	2000–01	Scottish Premier League	24	5	4	1	0	0	—		—		28	6
Dundee United	2001–02	Scottish Premier League	34	4	4	1	3	0	—		—		41	5
Dundee United	2002–03	Scottish Premier League	34	3	1	0	3	0	—		—		38	3
Dundee United	2003–04	Scottish Premier League	26	5	1	0	1	0	—		—		28	5
Dundee United	Total		118	17	10	2	7	0	0	0	0	0	135	19
Brann	2004	Tippeligaen	9	2	1	0	—		—		3 (Note: Appearances in the Royal League)	3	13	5
Brann	2005	Tippeligaen	23	5	3	4	—		4	2	7	1	37	12
Brann	2006	Tippeligaen	20	6	2	0	—		3	0	1	0	25	6
Brann	Total		52	13	6	4	0	0	7	2	11	4	65	23
Lierse	2006–07	Belgian First Division	12	4	0	0	—		—		5 (Note: Appearances in the Belgian First Division promotion and relegation playoff)	1	17	5
Lierse	2007–08	Belgian Second Division	20	6	2	0	—		—		—		22	6
Lierse	Total		32	10	2	0	0	0	0	0	0	0	34	10
Queensland Roar	2008–09	A-League	19	7	—		3	0	—		—		22	7
Queensland Roar	2009–10	A-League	11	1	—		—		—		—		11	1
Queensland Roar	Total		30	8	0	0	3	0	0	0	0	0	33	8
Gold Coast United	2009–10	A-League	10	1	—		—		—		—		10	1
Clyde	2010–11	Scottish Third Division	5	0	0	0	0	0	—		0	0	5	0
Career total			346	59	26	9	23	1	24	4	16	5	435	78

== Honours ==
=== Rangers ===
- Scottish Premier Division: 4

1994–95, 1995–96, 1996–97, 1998–99

- Scottish League Cup: 1

1996–97

=== Brann ===
- Norwegian Cup: 1

2004

=== Individual ===
- Scottish PFA Young Player of the Year: 1

1995

- A-League Foreign Player of the Year: 2008–2009
