= Aaron Conway =

Scottish footballer

Personal information
- Full name: Aaron Conway
- Date of birth: 29 March 1985 (age 41)
- Place of birth: Dundee, Scotland
- Height: 5 ft 11 in (1.80 m)
- Position: Winger

Team information
- Current team: Lochee Harp (player-coach)

Youth career
- 2001–2002: Dundee United

Senior career*
Years	Team	Apps	(Gls)
2002–2004	Dundee United	2	(0)
2004–2005	→ Clyde (loan)	10	(1)
2005	Dundee	2	(0)
2005–2006	Forfar Athletic	10	(0)
2006–2009	Carnoustie Panmure		
2009–2010	East Fife	25	(1)
2010–2011	Livingston	13	(1)
2011–2013	Peterhead	9	(0)
2013–2014	Buckie Thistle		
2018-	Lochee Harp		
- * Club domestic league appearances and goals as of 09:06, 12 June 2013 (UTC)

Aaron Conway (born 29 March 1985) was a Scottish professional footballer who plays for Lochee Harp. He also previously played for Dundee United, Clyde (on loan) Dundee, Forfar Athletic, Carnoustie Panmure, East Fife, Livingston where he won the league 1 championship and Peterhead.

== Playing career ==
Born in Dundee, Conway started his career with hometown club Dundee United but made just two substitute appearances for the Terrors, appearing in games late in each of the 2002–03 and 2003–04 seasons. Conway played ten games during a loan spell with Clyde, scoring his first senior goal, before being released from Tannadice in January 2005. Upon his release, Conway moved to city rivals Dundee, managing the same number of appearances, before signing for Forfar Athletic in July 2005.

Conway left senior football in 2006, joining Carnoustie Panmure. He then joined East Fife, managed by former Dundee United colleague Stevie Crawford, in July 2009. In June 2010, he signed a one-year contract with newly promoted Second Division side Livingston where he won the league .

In June 2011, Conway left Livingston to join Peterhead. After leaving Peterhead in 2013, Conway signed for Highland Football League side Buckie Thistle. He left Buckie in June 2014, deciding to retire from football aged 29 due to his work commitments offshore.

Following a spell away from the game, Conway signed for Lochee Harp and added coaching responsibilities to his role in 2022.
