= Peter Houston =

Scottish footballer & manager (born 1958)

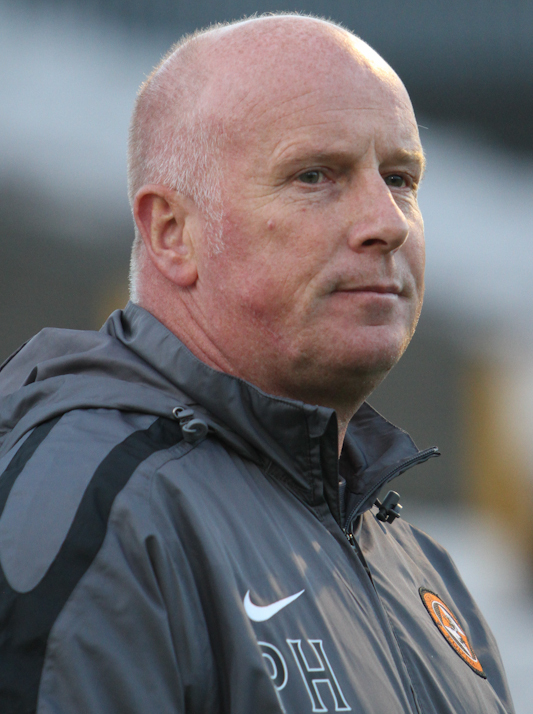
- Houston in 2011

Personal information
- Full name: Peter Houston
- Date of birth: 19 July 1958 (age 68)
- Place of birth: Baillieston, Scotland
- Position: Striker

Team information
- Current team: Scotland U21 (assistant)

Senior career*
Years	Team	Apps	(Gls)
1977–1978	Airdrieonians	1	(0)
1978–1979	Livingston United		
1979–1983	Albion Rovers	123	(33)
1983–1986	Falkirk	135	(33)
1986–1988	Dumbarton	80	(8)
1988–1991	Falkirk	77	(5)
1991–1993	East Stirlingshire	47	(3)
Total		463	(82)

Managerial career
- 2009–2013: Dundee United
- 2014–2017: Falkirk
- * Club domestic league appearances and goals

Peter Houston (born 19 July 1958) is a Scottish football player and manager who is assistant manager of the Scotland under-21 side.

Houston played as a striker for Airdrieonians, Livingston United, Albion Rovers, Falkirk, Dumbarton and East Stirlingshire.

After retiring as a player, Houston initially worked for Jim Jefferies at Falkirk and Hearts. He then assisted Craig Levein at Hearts, Leicester City and Dundee United. After Levein was appointed Scotland manager in December 2009, Houston was appointed Dundee United manager and assisted Levein with the national team. He guided United to their 2009–10 Scottish Cup victory, but left the club by mutual consent in January 2013. After working for Celtic as a scout, Houston was appointed manager of Falkirk in June 2014. He guided Falkirk to the promotion playoffs twice and the 2015 Scottish Cup Final, but was unable to win promotion.

== Early life ==
Peter Houston was born on 19 July 1958 in Baillieston, Lanarkshire.

== Playing career ==
Houston began his career in 1977 with Airdrieonians but made just one senior league appearance and dropped into junior football with Livingston United. In 1979, Houston moved back into senior football with Albion Rovers and played over 100 league matches over four years, scoring 33 times. A similar length of spell at Falkirk also yielded 33 goals and upon leaving in 1986 to join Dumbarton, Houston had made over 250 senior league appearances. After two years with Dumbarton, Houston returned to Falkirk for a further three years before a final playing spell with East Stirlingshire.

== Management career ==
=== Early coaching roles ===
Upon retiring in 1993, Houston returned to Falkirk for his third spell with the club, although this time in a coaching capacity. Houston was involved in setting up Falkirk's youth academy and went on to work as an SFA Development Officer at Brockville. When manager Jim Jefferies moved to Hearts in 1995, Houston joined him as reserve and youth team manager, becoming caretaker manager when Jefferies left for Bradford City in 2000. Despite being backed by the players for the manager role, Houston had to settle for an assistant manager role when Craig Levein was appointed instead. Houston followed Levein to Leicester City in 2004, where he stayed until Levein and his backroom staff were sacked in January 2006.

Houston lead a young Hearts team that included future Scotland caps Scott Severin and Robbie Neilson to the Scottish Youth Cup in 1998.

=== Dundee United ===
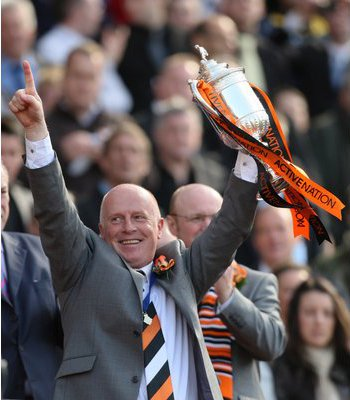
Houston winning the Scottish Cup with Dundee United.

Houston was out of football until his appointment as assistant manager to Levein at Dundee United in October 2006. During the summer of 2007, he suffered a bizarre injury by falling off his bike over the handlebars and breaking both wrists. Levein left the club in December 2009 to become manager of the Scotland national team, with Houston taking over as caretaker manager. Despite initially being considered favourite to take over on a permanent basis, Houston announced he would not be applying for the job following a 7–1 Ibrox defeat against Rangers under his tenure. In the wake of that result, the club tried to appoint then Bohemians manager Pat Fenlon as Levein's successor, but the deal to bring Fenlon to Tannadice broke down after the clubs were unable to agree compensation. After an improved run of form under his management, Houston was appointed United's manager until the end of the 2009–10 season. Houston also assisted Levein with his Scotland duties on a part-time basis. He guided Dundee United to 3rd place in the SPL and the final of the Scottish Cup, where they defeated Ross County 3–0 at Hampden Park on 15 May 2010 to seal their first major trophy for 16 years. On 25 May 2010, Houston accepted a three-year deal to become manager of Dundee United. "I'm absolutely privileged and honoured to be the manager of Dundee United. For me, the hard works starts now," he told BBC Scotland.

In his first full season as manager United in 4th place in the SPL, thereby qualifying for Europe again and reached the quarter-final of the Scottish Cup. In the summer of 2011 several key players left the club or were sold including David Goodwillie, Craig Conway and Morgaro Gomis. United's start to the 2011–2012 season was patchy. United won only two of their first 12 league matches and a League Cup defeat by First Division side Falkirk led to reports that a loss in the Terrors' next league game away to Dunfermline would result in Houston being sacked. After a convincing 4–1 win the United board backed Houston, but former manager Craig Levein criticised the board for not publicly supporting Houston earlier. Eventually, United's form improved and the club again finished in fourth place, once again qualifying for the UEFA Europa League, an achievement which pleased Houston who expressed pride in his players' performance.

Dundee United and Houston started contract negotiations during the 2012–13 season, but United chairman Stephen Thompson insisted that Houston would have to accept a cut in salary. On 14 January 2013, Dundee United granted Football League Championship club Blackpool permission to speak to Houston about their vacant managerial position. On 17 January 2013, Houston announced he would leave United at the end of the season after rejected a new contract. Following a 1–1 home result against Ross County on 26 January 2013, Houston left the club by mutual consent on 28 January 2013, bringing forward his date of departure. United chairman Stephen Thompson commented that football fans in the United Kingdom were not accustomed to managers pre-announcing their departure.

=== Falkirk ===
After leaving Dundee United, Houston joined Celtic as a scout in December 2013. Houston later says his time at Celtic was a positive one for him because they "were fantastic to work for".

After eight months at the club, Houston was appointed manager of Falkirk in June 2014, succeeding Gary Holt. He led the "Bairns" to the 2015 Scottish Cup Final, which Falkirk lost 2–1 to Inverness Caledonian Thistle. Falkirk finished second in the Championship in each of the following two seasons, but lost out in the promotion playoffs. After a slow start to the 2017–18 season, Houston was sacked by Falkirk on 24 September.

=== Scotland U21 and Morton assistant ===
Houston joined the Scotland U21 side as assistant manager to Scot Gemmill in March 2018. In September of that year, he was also appointed as Jonatan Johansson's assistant at Greenock Morton; continuing in both roles. Houston left Morton at the end of the 2018–19 season, as the club decided not to exercise the option of retaining him for the second year of his contract.

== Honours and achievements ==
=== Player ===
Falkirk

- Scottish Football League First Division promotion (1): 1985–86 (second tier)
- Scottish Football League First Division (1): 1990–91 (second tier)

=== Manager ===
Dundee United

- Scottish Cup (1): 2009–10

=== Individual ===
- SPL manager of the month (3): Mar 2010, Mar 2011 and Mar 2012.

== Managerial statistics ==
As of match played 23 September 2017

Team	From	To	Record				
Team	From	To	G	W	D	L	Win %
Dundee United	23 December 2009	28 January 2013	150	63	44	43	42.00
Falkirk	12 June 2014	24 September 2017	152	71	41	40	46.71
Total			302	134	85	83	44.37
