= Paul Gallacher =

Scottish footballer (born 1979)

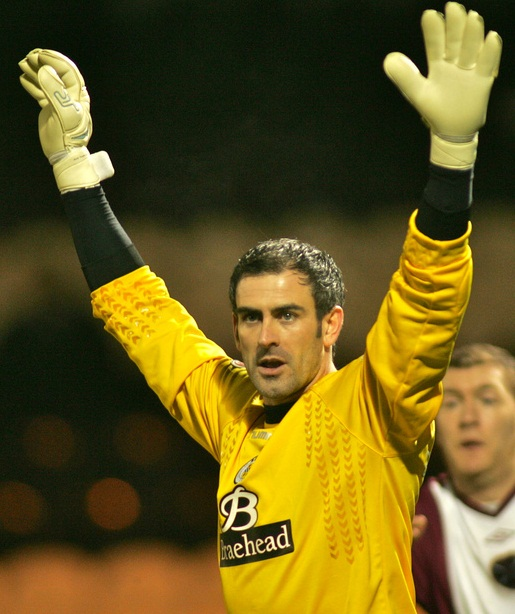
- Gallacher playing for St Mirren

Personal information
- Full name: Paul James Gallacher
- Date of birth: 16 August 1979 (age 47)
- Place of birth: Glasgow, Scotland
- Position: Goalkeeper

Team information
- Current team: St Johnstone (Goalkeeper Coach)

Senior career*
Years	Team	Apps	(Gls)
1997–2004	Dundee United	121	(0)
1999–2000	→ Airdrieonians (loan)	9	(0)
2004–2007	Norwich City	31	(0)
2004	→ Gillingham (loan)	3	(0)
2005	→ Sheffield Wednesday (loan)	12	(0)
2007	→ Dunfermline Athletic (loan)	13	(0)
2008–2009	Dunfermline Athletic	53	(0)
2009–2011	St Mirren	63	(0)
2011–2013	Dunfermline Athletic	46	(0)
2013	Ross County	1	(0)
2013–2016	Partick Thistle	37	(0)
2016–2017	Heart of Midlothian	0	(0)
Total		385	(0)

International career
1999–2000	Scotland under-21	12	(0)
2002–2007	Scotland B	5	(0)
2002–2004	Scotland	8	(0)
- * Club domestic league appearances and goals

Paul James Gallacher (born 16 August 1979) is a Scottish professional football coach and former player. Gallacher made eight appearances for the Scotland national team between 2002 and 2004. He started his career at Dundee United and made 127 appearances for them over a seven-year period, and has also played for Airdrieonians, Norwich City, Gillingham, Sheffield Wednesday, Dunfermline Athletic, St Mirren, Ross County and Partick Thistle.

He is the son of Jim Gallacher, a goalkeeper who played in the Scottish Football League for 22 years, and the cousin of full-back Tony Gallacher, who was previously on the books of Liverpool.

== Career ==
=== Dundee United ===
Gallacher was born in Glasgow, and started his career with Gleniffer Thistle Boys Club. He signed S Form with Dundee United after he left school in 1996 and spent eight years with the club. He had a short loan spell at Lochee United and Airdrieonians in 1999 but became first choice with Dundee United at the start of 2001, replacing Alan Combe in the team. Gallacher was a regular for Berti Vogts' Scotland squads, winning eight international caps between 2002 and 2004.

=== Norwich ===
Gallacher left Dundee United to join Norwich City in July 2004 on a free transfer. The Canaries had just been promoted to the Premiership. He looked to be second-choice goalkeeper under Robert Green, but just days before the start of the Premiership season Gallacher got injured and City signed Darren Ward and pushed Gallacher down to third choice.

He had a loan spell at Gillingham in 2004 but was recalled after an injury to Ward. Gallacher was on the bench for City a couple of times but never came on. In March 2005 he joined Paul Sturrock's Sheffield Wednesday on loan and performed well but was sent off against Bristol City in his eighth game and soon thereafter lost his place. He did not play in the play-off final win against Hartlepool United, although he was on the bench.

Gallacher played in the last few matches of the 2005–06 season for Norwich following an injury to Robert Green. There was speculation concerning Gallacher's future as his contract was due to expire in the summer of 2006, however his impressive performances at the end of that season led to him being offered a new two-year deal, which he subsequently signed. Green was still unfit at the start of the 2006–07 season, and Gallacher retained his place in the side. When Green then signed for Premiership team West Ham, his position as first-choice keeper seemed assumed.

Previous manager Nigel Worthington was sacked in October. Peter Grant was installed as the new manager and when watching his first city game from the stands against QPR, Gallacher was at fault for a last minute QPR equaliser. This led to Grant signing Jamie Ashdown on loan for a month. However Ashdown was sent off in his second game and Gallacher regained his place after this. Gallacher injured his foot against Hull and Lee Camp on loan from Derby came in for three games.

In January 2007 in the 3–1 defeat against Plymouth Gallacher was at fault for two of the goals. After this Grant once again brought in another keeper on loan in Scotland international David Marshall. Marshall was supposed to be at City for the rest of the season but in the 4–0 FA cup defeat to Chelsea Marshall was injured and ruled out for the rest of the season. Once again Gallacher was first choice keeper. However, after three games Gallacher made another mistake in the match against Luton. Tony Warner was brought in on loan and he became Cities fifth goalkeeper of the season. Warner went on to play in the remaining games of the season.

Gallacher was fourth choice keeper going into the 2007–08 season and his future at Norwich looked very bleak. He was loaned out to Dunfermline until January but in January his City contract was terminated by mutual consent.

=== Dunfermline Athletic ===
On 20 August 2007, Gallacher moved on loan to Scottish First Division side Dunfermline Athletic. He helped them earn valuable points with stunning penalty saves against Dundee and Queen of the South. On 31 December 2007, Gallacher's contract with Norwich City was terminated by mutual consent with immediate effect. One day later, it was officially announced that Gallacher had joined Dunfermline Athletic until the end of the season. After being arguably the best keeper in the division for most of the season, Gallacher signed a new contract with the Pars.

=== St Mirren ===
St Mirren signed Gallacher on a two-year deal in 2009, which allowed Gallacher to play in the Scottish Premier League. Following an excellent start to the 2009–10 season, Gallacher was called up to the Scotland squad for the friendly match against Wales. He went on to make 77 appearances in all competitions for St Mirren.

=== Dunfermline Athletic (return) ===
On 9 June 2011 Gallacher signed a 2-year contract with Dunfermline Athletic. Gallacher had a very good start to the 2011–12 season, saving penalty kicks against St Mirren and St Johnstone, which earned him the SPL player of the month award for July / August 2011. He continued to play regularly for Dunfermline until a shoulder injury suffered in December, which has ruled him out for the rest of the season. As Dunfermline entered administration in March 2013, Gallacher was one of several players made redundant by the club.

=== Ross County ===
Gallacher signed a short-term deal with Ross County shortly after leaving Dunfermline. He would make his debut on the final day of the season, keeping a clean sheet in the highland derby against Inverness Caledonian Thistle.

=== Partick Thistle ===
Paul Gallacher signed for Scottish Premiership side Partick Thistle in May 2013, on a one-year deal with the offer of a further extension. As well as a squad player, he joined as a goalkeeping coach. He made his competitive debut for Thistle on 28 September 2013, during a 1–1 draw at St Johnstone. He had to wait a further four months to make his home debut, during a 1–1 draw with Kilmarnock on 18 January 2014. He saved a penalty kick from Barry Robson whilst playing against Aberdeen, which was crucial for Thistle's first home win of the campaign. Gallacher became a regular at Firhill following an ankle injury of fellow goalkeeper Scott Fox.

Gallacher signed a new one-year contract with Thistle in May 2014. He made his first appearance of the 2014–15 Scottish Premiership season on 16 August, coming on as a replacement for the sent-off goalkeeper Scott Fox against Dundee. He went on to save the subsequent Gary Harkins penalty. Gallacher also made a first team appearance against Aberdeen at Firhill, due to Fox suffering from food poisoning.

Gallacher became the third-choice goalkeeper during the 2015/16 season, behind Tomas Cerny and Ryan Scully. He made an appearance in a 1–1 draw with Dundee in November 2015. After 3 years with Thistle, Gallacher rejected a new contract and left the club in June 2016.

=== Hearts ===
On 16 June 2016, Gallacher signed for Scottish Premiership side Hearts on a free transfer. He joined Hearts in a player-coach capacity. Gallacher continued to coach the Hearts goalkeepers after his retirement from playing, until he left the club in 2026.

== Career statistics ==
As of end of 2015–2016 season

Club	Season	League			Cup		League Cup		Other		Total	
Club	Season	Division	Apps	Goals	Apps	Goals	Apps	Goals	Apps	Goals	Apps	Goals
Dundee United	1999–2000	Scottish Premier League	1	0	0	0	0	0	-		1	0
Dundee United	2000–01	Scottish Premier League	15	0	4	0	0	0	-		19	0
Dundee United	2001–02	Scottish Premier League	38	0	4	0	3	0	-		45	0
Dundee United	2002–03	Scottish Premier League	34	0	1	0	3	0	-		38	0
Dundee United	2003–04	Scottish Premier League	33	0	1	0	1	0	-		35	0
Dundee United	Total		121	0	10	0	7	0	0	0	138	0
Airdrieonians (loan)	1999–00	Scottish First Division	9	0	0	0	0	0	0	0	9	0
Norwich City	2004–05	Premier League	0	0	0	0	0	0	-		0	0
Norwich City	2005–06	Football League Championship	4	0	0	0	0	0	-		4	0
Norwich City	2006–07	Football League Championship	27	0	2	0	3	0	-		32	0
Norwich City	2007–08	Football League Championship	0	0	0	0	0	0	-		0	0
Norwich City	Total		31	0	2	0	3	0	0	0	36	0
Gillingham (loan)	2004–05	Football League Championship	3	0	0	0	0	0	-		3	0
Sheffield Wednesday (loan)	2004–05	Football League One	8	0	0	0	0	0	0	0	8	0
Dunfermline Athletic	2007–08	Scottish First Division	13	0	0	0	1	0	3	0	17	0
Dunfermline Athletic	2007–08	Scottish First Division	17	0	1	0	0	0	0	0	18	0
Dunfermline Athletic	2008–09	Scottish First Division	36	0	5	0	4	0	2	0	47	0
Dunfermline Athletic	Total		66	0	6	0	5	0	5	0	82	0
St Mirren	2009–10	Scottish Premier League	36	0	3	0	6	0	-		45	0
St Mirren	2010–11	Scottish Premier League	27	0	5	0	1	0	-		33	0
St Mirren	Total		63	0	8	0	7	0	0	0	78	0
Dunfermline Athletic	2011–12	Scottish Premier League	18	0	0	0	2	0	-		20	0
Dunfermline Athletic	2012–13	Scottish First Division	28	0	2	0	2	0	1	0	33	0
Dunfermline Athletic	Total		46	0	2	0	4	0	1	0	53	0
Ross County	2012–13	Scottish Premier League	1	0	0	0	0	0	-		1	0
Partick Thistle	2013–14	Scottish Premiership	18	0	0	0	0	0	-		18	0
Partick Thistle	2014–15	Scottish Premiership	18	0	2	0	1	0	-		21	0
Partick Thistle	2015–16	Scottish Premiership	1	0	0	0	0	0	-		1	0
Partick Thistle	Total		37	0	2	0	1	0	0	0	40	0
Career total			385	0	30	0	27	0	6	0	449	0
