= Scott Paterson =

Scottish footballer and coach (born 1972)

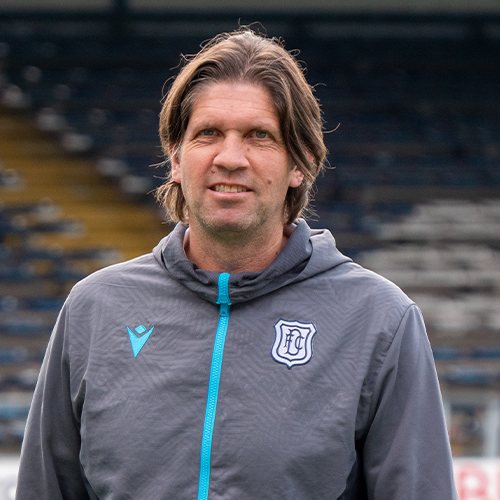
- Scott Paterson in 2024

Personal information
- Full name: Scott Thomas Paterson
- Date of birth: 13 May 1972 (age 54)
- Place of birth: Aberdeen, Scotland
- Position: Defender

Team information
- Current team: Dundee (First team coach)

Senior career*
| Years | Team | Apps | (Gls) |
| 1991–1992 | Cove Rangers | | |
| 1992–1994 | Liverpool | 0 | (0) |
| 1994–1998 | Bristol City | 53 | (1) |
| 1997 | → Cardiff City (loan) | 5 | (0) |
| 1998–1999 | Carlisle United | 19 | (1) |
| 1999–2000 | Cambridge United | 6 | (0) |
| 2000 | Plymouth Argyle | 5 | (0) |
| 2000 | Peterhead | 10 | (1) |
| 2000–2001 | Ross County | 0 | (0) |
| 2001 | Greenock Morton | 8 | (0) |
| 2001–2003 | Partick Thistle | 68 | (0) |
| 2003–2005 | Dundee United | 3 | (0) |
| 2005 | → Partick Thistle (loan) | 1 | (0) |
| 2005–2006 | St Johnstone | 4 | (0) |
| 2006 | Gretna | 4 | (0) |
| 2006–2008 | Cove Rangers | | |
- * Club domestic league appearances and goals

Scott Thomas Paterson (born 13 May 1972) is a Scottish professional football coach and former player who played as a defender. He was most recently assistant manager of Partick Thistle. He played for numerous clubs in Scotland and England, including Liverpool, Carlisle United, Bristol City, Partick Thistle and Dundee United.

== Career ==
A product of the Scottish Highland Football League, Paterson began his professional career with his local Senior Club, Cove Rangers F.C. of the Scottish Highland Football League before winning a £15,000 move to Graeme Souness's Liverpool in March 1992. After two full seasons at Anfield but no first team appearances, Paterson spent four years with Bristol City, where he was loaned to Cardiff City in 1997. He then embarked on a series of moves around Britain which saw him spend no more than a season at any one club, and which included a short stint (between Carlisle United and Plymouth Argyle) back in the Highland Football League with Huntly FC, where his older brother was centre half at the time. He also had a spell at Cambridge United during this period.

In the summer of 2000 he made the move to professional Scottish football when he signed for Third Division side Peterhead. At Peterhead he scored once in the league against East Fife. However it wasn't long before he moved up to the First Division where he initially joined Ross County, but didn't make any appearances, and then Morton in March 2001. He was unable to prevent Morton's relegation to the Second Division. However he remained in the First Division when he signed for newly promoted side Partick Thistle. Paterson helped Thistle get a second successive promotion in 2002 and would therefore play in the Scottish Premier League. Paterson managed 68 league games for Partick Thistle. He scored two goals during his time at the club; both of which came during their run in the 2001–02 Scottish Cup. Thistle drew Inverness in the quarter-final and Paterson scored in the original tie as it ended in a draw, before scoring the winner in the replay. However Thistle were defeated in the semi-final by Rangers. His performances at Thistle won a move to Dundee United. Although his length of time at Tannadice was similar, Paterson was injured in his second match for the club against Celtic and spent almost his entire time injured, appearing briefly in the final match of the 2003–04 season also against Celtic. Further short spells in Scotland followed, including a brief loan spell back at Partick Thistle, before Paterson returned to his first, and home town club, Cove Rangers F. C. who play just outside the City of Aberdeen, and back in the Highland Football League at the start of 2006–07. Paterson went on to be a youth coach at Aberdeen before linking up with former Dundee United colleague Gary Bollan at Livingston in September 2009. On 30 January 2013 he was appointed interim assistant manager, alongside Alan Archibald, at Partick Thistle. He left Partick Thistle along with Archibald in October 2018 as the pair were relieved of their duties after a poor run of form.

In November 2021 Stephen Wright, the Head of academy for Dundee, revealed that Paterson had been assisting him at their Performance School.

== Honours ==
=== Partick Thistle ===
- Scottish Football League First Division: 1

2001–02
