= Danny Griffin (footballer) =

Northern Irish footballer

Personal information
- Full name: Daniel Joseph Griffin
- Date of birth: 10 August 1977 (age 49)
- Place of birth: Belfast, Northern Ireland
- Positions: Defender; midfielder

Youth career
- Wolfhill Boys Club
- 1994: St Andrew's Boys Club

Senior career*
Years	Team	Apps	(Gls)
1994–2000	St Johnstone	124	(4)
2000–2004	Dundee United	77	(4)
2004–2005	Stockport County	35	(1)
2005–2006	Aberdeen	10	(0)
2006–2008	Dundee	31	(0)
2008–2009	Ross County	0	(0)
2009–2010	Livingston	37	(2)
2010–2011	Arbroath	18	(0)
Total		332	(11)

International career^{‡}
1996–2004	Northern Ireland	29	(1)
- * Club domestic league appearances and goals as of 10 May 2011 ‡ National team caps and goals as of 19 August 2006

Daniel Joseph Griffin (born 10 August 1977) is a Northern Irish retired footballer. He was primarily a defender, but could also play in midfield. He is a youth coach with his first professional club, St Johnstone.

== Career ==
At age 15, Griffin left high school in Belfast six months early to join St Johnstone. He made his professional debut two years later. It was while he was with the McDiarmid Park club that Griffin made his international debut against Germany in a 1–1 draw on 29 May 1996 in Belfast and scored his first international goal in a friendly against the Republic of Ireland three years, to the day, later.

In the following months, English club Derby County offered St Johnstone £1,000,000 for their 18-year-old centre-back. Griffin was beginning to develop a good relationship with St Johnstone and he felt there was much more he could learn from Paul Sturrock, so he turned down the move. In 1996, Griffin scored an own goal, the only goal of the game, in the Scottish Challenge Cup Final loss to Stranraer.

After seven years in Perth, Griffin followed manager Paul Sturrock to Tayside rivals Dundee United. However, he suffered a knee injury that saw him out for four months. By December, Griffin made his return from injury. On 23 December 2000, he made his return to the starting line-up and played 81 minutes before being substituted, in a 3-1 loss against Hearts. On 4 April 2001, Griffin scored his first goal for the club, in a 4-1 loss against Aberdeen.

Ahead of the 2001-02 season, Griffin was eventually become captain. Following injury problems, Griffin lost his regular place and joined English side Stockport County in 2004 as a free agent. After being released by Stockport, in December 2005 he signed for Aberdeen. Just four months later, however, he was informed that the club would not renew his contract at the end of the season.

In June 2006, Griffin became one of new Dundee manager Alex Rae's first signings, agreeing a two-year contract. On 8 January 2007 he left the club by mutual consent and joined Ross County a week later. Griffin was released by Ross County after suffering more injuries. He then joined Livingston in January 2009. After winning the third division championship with Livingston, Griffin joined Arbroath in June 2010 on a one-year deal where he won the third division title for a second successive season.

== International goals ==
Scores and results list Northern Ireland's goal tally first.

#	Date	Venue	Opponent	Score	Result	Competition
1	29 May 1999	Dublin, Republic of Ireland	Republic of Ireland	1–0	1–0	Friendly match

== Career statistics ==
Club	Season	League		Cup		Lg Cup		Other		Total	
Club	Season	Apps	Goals	Apps	Goals	Apps	Goals	Apps	Goals	Apps	Goals
St Johnstone	1996–97	1	1	1	0	2	0	0	0	4	1
St Johnstone	1997–98	13	0	0	0	1	1	0	0	14	1
St Johnstone	1998–99	19	1	4	0	3	0	0	0	26	1
St Johnstone	1999–00	30	1	1	0	1	1	2	0	34	2
St Johnstone	Total	63	3	6	0	7	2	2	0	82	5
Dundee United	2000–01	18	1	4	0	0	0	0	0	22	1
Dundee United	2001–02	29	2	2	0	3	1	0	0	34	3
Dundee United	2002–03	17	1	0	0	0	0	0	0	17	1
Dundee United	2003–04	13	0	0	0	1	0	0	0	13	0
Dundee United	Total	76	4	6	0	4	1	0	0	86	5
Stockport County	2003–04	15	1	0	0	0	0	0	0	15	1
Stockport County	2004–05	16	0	3	1	0	0	2	0	21	1
Stockport County	2005–06	4	0	0	0	0	0	1	0	5	0
Stockport County	Total	35	1	3	1	0	0	3	0	41	2
Aberdeen	2005–06	10	0	2	0	0	0	0	0	12	0
Aberdeen	Total	10	0	2	0	0	0	0	0	12	0
Dundee	2006–07	24	0	2	0	0	0	1	0	27	0
Dundee	2007–08	7	0	0	0	2	0	1	0	10	0
Dundee	Total	31	0	2	0	2	0	2	0	37	0
Ross County	2008–09	6	0	0	0	0	0	0	0	6	0
Ross County	Total	6	0	0	0	0	0	0	0	6	0
Career total		221	8	19	1	13	3	7	0	260	12

== Honours ==
St Johnstone

- Scottish Challenge Cup runner-up: 1

1996–97

- Scottish League Cup runner-up: 1

1998–99

Livingston

- Scottish Third Division winner: 1

2009–10

Arbroath

- Scottish Third Division winner: 1

2010–11
