= Daniel Ogunmade =

Scottish-Nigerian footballer

Personal information
- Date of birth: 26 October 1983 (age 43)
- Place of birth: Lagos, Nigeria
- Position: Forward

Youth career
- Dundee United

College career
Years	Team	Apps	(Gls)
2005–2007	NOC Tonkawa Mavericks		
2007–2008	Mercer Bears		

Senior career*
Years	Team	Apps	(Gls)
2000–2004	Dundee United	7	(1)
2003	→ Forfar Athletic (loan)	5	(0)
2004	→ Ross County (loan)	4	(0)
2004	Stenhousemuir	1	(0)
2005	Bellshill Athletic		
- * Club domestic league appearances and goals

Daniel Ogunmade (born 26 October 1983) is a Scottish-Nigerian footballer who played as a forward. He played professionally in Scotland for Dundee United and Stenhousemuir, as well as for Forfar Athletic and Ross County on loan. In 2005, he moved to the United States to study, where he played college soccer before retiring from the sport.

== Early life ==
Ogunmade was born in Lagos, Nigeria. When he was 9 years old his family moved to Scotland, where he grew up in the Garrowhill area of Glasgow.

== Career ==
Ogunmade started his career with Dundee United. He was loaned to lower league clubs Forfar Athletic and Ross County. After leaving United in 2004, Ogunmade played as a trialist for Stenhousemuir and had a spell with Junior side Bellshill Athletic. After failing to win a deal in Britain, Ogunmade moved to the US, where his form for Northern Oklahoma College led to NSCAA All-American recognition in 2007. Ogunmade moved to Georgia-based Mercer University in 2007.
