= Ian McCall (footballer) =

Scottish Football coach and former player (born 1964)

Personal information
- Full name: Ian Holland McCall
- Date of birth: 30 September 1964 (age 62)
- Place of birth: Dumfries, Scotland
- Position: Midfielder

Senior career*
Years	Team	Apps	(Gls)
1983–1986	Queen's Park	66	(9)
1986–1987	Dunfermline Athletic	47	(8)
1987–1989	Rangers	21	(2)
1989–1990	Bradford City	12	(1)
1990–1991	Dunfermline Athletic	38	(5)
1991–1992	Dundee	27	(9)
1992–1994	Falkirk	75	(9)
1994–1995	Hamilton Academical	6	(1)
1995–1996	Happy Valley	21	(4)
1996–1997	Partick Thistle	7	(0)
1997–1998	Clydebank	21	(1)
Total		341	(49)

Managerial career
- 1997–2000: Clydebank
- 2000: Greenock Morton
- 2001–2002: Airdrieonians
- 2002–2003: Falkirk
- 2003–2005: Dundee United
- 2005–2007: Queen of the South
- 2007–2011: Partick Thistle
- 2015–2019: Ayr United
- 2019–2023: Partick Thistle
- 2023–2024: Clyde
- * Club domestic league appearances and goals

Ian Holland McCall (born 30 September 1964) is a Scottish former football player and coach, who most recently managed Scottish League Two club Clyde.

During his playing days McCall played for Queen's Park, Dunfermline Athletic, Rangers, Bradford City, Dundee, Falkirk, Hamilton Academical, Happy Valley, Partick Thistle and Clydebank.

He is probably best known for his two spells as manager of Partick Thistle from 2007 until 2011 and again from 2019 until 2023.

He began an extensive managerial career, mostly in the lower leagues of Scotland starting with Clydebank, Greenock Morton, Airdrieonians, Falkirk, Dundee United, Queen of the South, Partick Thistle, Ayr United and Clyde.

== Playing career ==
Ian McCall was born in Dumfries, Scotland. In his boyhood, he was a regular on the Palmerston terraces watching Queen of the South. His hopes of playing for his home town club were dashed, though, by then chairman Willie Harkness. "I played a trial game for the club, and thought I did reasonably well," McCall recalls. "Drew Busby was the manager, but I was told by Willie Harkness I might not make the grade. Instead I went to Queen's Park, and then three years after that was sold to Rangers for £250,000."

McCall began his career as a midfielder for Queen's Park in 1983, then was with Dunfermline Athletic from 1986 to 1987, and Rangers from 1987 to 1990. He was transferred to Bradford City for £200,000 before rejoining Dunfermline. His playing career also included spells with Dundee, Falkirk, Hamilton Academical, Happy Valley in Hong Kong and Partick Thistle back in Scotland. His final club as a player was Clydebank, where he became player-manager during the 1997–98 season.

McCall never made more than 75 league appearances in a single spell for one club. He made 85 league appearances for Dunfermline broken over two separate periods with the Fife club.

== Managerial career ==
=== Clydebank, Morton and Airdrie ===
His spell at Clydebank took place against the backdrop of an abortive scheme to relocate the club to Dublin.

In 17 games in charge at Morton, McCall achieved five wins and 9 defeats.

This was followed by a move to Airdrieonians. Airdrie challenged for promotion to the Scottish Premier League before the club's extinction in 2002, making McCall the last manager in the club's history. McCall won 23 of his 65 games in charge.

=== Falkirk and Dundee United ===
A spell, at Falkirk, with the best win rate of his managerial career, led to McCall twice being offered the manager's job at Dundee United, which he finally accepted in January 2003. In McCall's first top flight managerial season the Tayside club achieved a top-6 finish, but in the following season with the club in a relegation battle he was sacked in March 2005.

=== Queen of the South ===
In November 2005, Ian McCall returned to management with his home town club Queen of the South. After a less than auspicious start to his reign as Queens manager, the Palmerston outfit enjoyed somewhat of a resurgence in the early months of 2006, finally securing eight position in the league and thus avoiding having to play-off to maintain first division status. 2006/07 provided a second relegation battle. Allan Jenkins scored the Stranraer winner on a 2 January South West relegation derby leaving Queens firmly in the play off spot that was ninth place. However Jenkins was sold to Gretna 10 days later. Stranraer's league form imploded immediately recording only one other league win from then until the season's end. Despite narrowly avoiding relegation, Ian McCall was sacked by Queen of the South, with his assistant Gordon Chisholm taking over. His departure from Queen of the South was in bitter circumstances. McCall fielded an ineligible player in Jamie Adams in a Scottish Cup run early in 2007. Queens were fined £20,000 by the SFA. Chairman Davie Rae described the fine as, "A considerable sum". McCall's departure from Queens was at the season's end. In 70 games in charge McCall notched 19 wins.

=== Partick Thistle ===
He became manager of Partick Thistle in May 2007. staying until 15 April 2011 when he departed after achieving 70 wins from 179 games in charge. In his first season in charge, McCall largely rebuilt the squad, bringing in players such as Marc Twaddle, Gary Harkins and Liam Buchanan, each of whom would go on to serve with distinction at the club.

=== Ayr United ===
After four years out of the game, McCall was appointed manager of Ayr United in January 2015. He led the "Honest Men" to promotion to the Scottish Championship through the play-offs in May 2016. They were relegated the following season in May 2017. McCall then led an instant promotion back to the second tier in the following season by winning the Scottish League One title. Ayr reached the promotion playoffs in 2018–19. McCall left the club in September 2019 to rejoin Partick Thistle.

=== Partick Thistle (second spell) ===
During his second stint as Thistle manager, McCall won promotion to the Championship in 2020–21. This had followed their relegation in the 2019–20 season, which had been curtailed by the COVID-19 pandemic. McCall left the club on 12 February 2023, following a Scottish Cup defeat against Rangers.

=== Clyde ===
McCall was appointed Clyde manager in November 2023. He led the club to League Two survival despite being once ten points adrift in February. In October, amid a winless run of seven matches which left the Bully Wee second bottom of the league, McCall departed the club by mutual consent.

== Media work ==
McCall has worked for a number of years as a media pundit. McCall commented, "I can't really slag my bosses at the BBC because they're my pals."

== Personal life ==
McCall lives in Glasgow. He has a son, called Edson, from a previous marriage.

== Honours and achievements ==
=== Player ===
Dundee

- Scottish First Division (1): 1991–92

Falkirk

- Scottish First Division (1): 1993–94
- Scottish Challenge Cup (1): 1993–94
- Stirlingshire Cup (1): 1992–93

=== Manager ===
Clydebank

- Scottish Second Division: Promotion 1997–98

Airdrieonians

- Scottish Challenge Cup: 2001–02

Falkirk

- Stirlingshire Cup: 2002–03

Ayr United

- Scottish League One : 2017–18
- Scottish Championship Play-offs: 2015–16

Partick Thistle

- Scottish League One: 2020–21

=== Individual ===
- SPFL League One Manager of the Year (3): 2015–16, 2017–18, 2020–21

== Managerial statistics ==
As of match played 5 October 2024

Team	From	To	Record				
Team	From	To	G	W	D	L	Win %
Clydebank	8 July 1997	14 January 2000	113	36	31	46	31.86
Greenock Morton	14 January 2000	1 June 2000	17	5	3	9	29.41
Airdrieonians	1 March 2001	28 April 2002	65	23	25	17	35.38
Falkirk	6 May 2002	30 January 2003	30	18	9	3	60.00
Dundee United	30 January 2003	14 March 2005	92	28	24	40	30.43
Queen of the South	November 2005	28 April 2007	70	19	24	27	27.14
Partick Thistle	25 May 2007	15 April 2011	179	70	46	63	39.11
Ayr United	5 January 2015	23 September 2019	217	100	44	73	46.08
Partick Thistle	23 September 2019	12 February 2023	135	56	30	49	41.48
Clyde	15 November 2023	10 October 2024	40	12	12	16	30.00
Total			845	331	217	297	39.17
