= 1989–90 Aberdeen F.C. season =

Aberdeen F.C.
1989–90 season
- Chairman: Dick Donald
- Co-Managers: Alex Smith; Jocky Scott
- Scottish Premier Division: 2nd
- Scottish Cup: Winners
- Scottish League Cup: Winners
- UEFA Cup: First round
- Top goalscorer: League: Charlie Nicholas (11); All: Paul Mason (15)
- Highest home attendance: 23,000 vs. Rangers, 22 November 1989 and 8 April 1990
- Lowest home attendance: 7,977 vs. St Mirren, 28 April 1990
- Average home league attendance: 15,445

Aberdeen F.C. competed in the Scottish Premier Division, Scottish Cup, Scottish League Cup and UEFA Cup in the 1989–90 season.

== Overview ==
In October 1989, Aberdeen reached the Scottish League Cup final for the third successive season and faced Rangers for the third successive year. Aberdeen won 2–1 thanks to two goals from Englishman Paul Mason and a superb display from Dutch goalkeeper Theo Snelders.

November saw a new signing from PSV Eindhoven, striker Hans Gillhaus, join for a record transfer fee of £650,000. The Dutchman made an immediate impact by scoring twice on his debut against Dunfermline Athletic. In May 1990, Aberdeen won the Scottish Cup for the seventh time after a penalty shoot-out victory over Celtic following a 0–0 draw.

Two Aberdeen players won player-of-the-year awards: Alex McLeish won the Scottish Football Writers' Player of the Year award and Jim Bett was voted Scottish Professional Footballers' Association Players' Player of the Year.

== Results ==
=== Scottish Premier Division ===
Match Day	Date	Opponent	H/A	Score	Aberdeen Scorer(s)	Attendance
1	12 August	Hibernian	H	1–0	Mason	16,000
2	19 August	Motherwell	A	0–0		6,491
3	26 August	Dundee	H	1–0	Jess	12,500
4	9 September	Rangers	A	0–1		40,283
5	16 September	Dunfermline Athletic	H	2–1	C. Robertson, Mason	13,000
6	23 September	St Mirren	A	2–0	Grant, Mason	5,872
7	30 September	Celtic	H	1–1	McLeish	21,374
8	4 October	Dundee United	A	0–2		11,879
9	14 October	Heart of Midlothian	H	1–3	van der Ark	15,000
10	25 October	Hibernian	A	3–0	C. Robertson, van der Ark, Mason	12,000
11	28 October	Motherwell	H	1–0	Bett	13,500
12	4 November	Dundee	A	1–1	Connor	7,041
13	18 November	Dunfermline Athletic	A	3–0	D. Robertson, Gillhaus (2)	11,882
14	22 November	Rangers	H	1–0	Gillhaus	23,000
15	25 November	St Mirren	H	5–0	McLeish, Nicholas (3), Mason	13,500
16	2 December	Celtic	A	0–1		38,300
17	9 December	Dundee United	H	2–0	Nicholas, Mason	15,500
18	20 December	Heart of Midlothian	A	1–1	Grant	11,370
19	26 December	Hibernian	H	1–2	Grant	16,500
20	30 December	Motherwell	A	2–2	van der Ark	7,267
21	2 January	Dundee	H	5–2	Grant, Nicholas, Bett, van der Ark (2)	16,054
22	6 January	Rangers	A	0–2		41,351
23	13 January	Dunfermline Athletic	H	4–1	Grant, Nicholas, Bett, Mason	14,000
24	27 January	St Mirren	A	0–1		7,855
25	3 February	Heart of Midlothian	H	2–2	Nicholas (2)	15,000
26	10 February	Dundee United	A	1–1	Mason	10,533
27	17 February	Celtic	H	1–1	Nicholas	22,100
28	3 March	Dunfermline Athletic	A	4–2	Nicholas, Mason, Gillhaus (2)	8,228
29	10 March	Hibernian	A	2–3	van der Ark, Own goal	9,550
30	24 March	Motherwell	H	2–0	Gillhaus (2)	10,000
31	31 March	Dundee	A	1–1	Gillhaus	8,071
32	8 April	Rangers	H	0–0		23,000
33	18 April	Dundee United	H	1–0	Grant	10,000
34	21 April	Heart of Midlothian	A	0–1		11,616
35	28 April	St Mirren	H	2–0	Irvine, Nicholas	7,977
36	2 May	Celtic	A	3–1	Graham Watson, Jess (2)	20,154

==== Final standings ====
Pos	Team	Pld	W	D	L	GF	GA	GD	Pts	Qualification or relegation
1	Rangers (C)	36	20	11	5	48	19	+29	51	Qualification for the European Cup first round
2	Aberdeen	36	17	10	9	56	33	+23	44	Qualification for the Cup Winners' Cup first round
3	Heart of Midlothian	36	16	12	8	54	35	+19	44	Qualification for the UEFA Cup first round
4	Dundee United	36	11	13	12	36	39	−3	35	Qualification for the UEFA Cup first round
5	Celtic	36	10	14	12	37	37	0	34	

Source: RSSSF
Rules for classification: 1) points; 2) goal difference; 3) number of goals scored.
(C) Champions

=== Scottish League Cup ===
Round	Date	Opponent	H/A	Score	Aberdeen Scorer(s)	Attendance
R2	16 August	Albion Rovers	A	2–0	D. Robertson, van der Ark	2,384
R3	23 August	Airdrieonians	H	4–0	Bett, Mason (2), Cameron	10,000
QF	30 August	St Mirren	H	3–1	Bett, Mason, Winnie	11,500
SF	20 September	Celtic	N	1–0	Cameron	45,367
F	22 October	Rangers	N	2–1	Mason (2)	61,190

=== Scottish Cup ===
Round	Date	Opponent	H/A	Score	Aberdeen Scorer(s)	Attendance
R3	20 January	Partick Thistle	A	6–2	Grant, Mason, van der Ark (3), Kerr	11,875
R4	24 February	Morton	H	2–1	Nicholas, Gillhaus	14,500
QF	17 March	Heart of Midlothian	H	4–1	Nicholas, Gillhaus, Irvine, Bett	22,500
SF	14 April	Dundee United	N	4–0	Irvine, Paatelainen, van der Hoorn, Gillhaus	16,581
F	12 May	Celtic	N	0–0 (9–8 on penalties)		60,493

=== UEFA Cup ===
Round	Date	Opponent	H/A	Score	Aberdeen Scorer(s)	Attendance
R1 L1	13 September	(Austria) Rapid Vienna	H	2–1	C. Robertson, Grant	16,800
R1 L2	27 September	(Austria) Rapid Vienna	A	0–1		19,000

== Squad ==
=== Appearances & Goals ===
No.	Pos	Nat	Player	Total		Premier Division		Scottish Cup		League Cup		Europe	
No.	Pos	Nat	Player	Apps	Goals	Apps	Goals	Apps	Goals	Apps	Goals	Apps	Goals
	MF	(Scotland) SCO	Jim Bett	41	6	30	3	4	1	5	2	2	0
	FW	(Scotland) SCO	Scott Booth	2	0	2	0	0	0	0	0	0	0
	MF	(Scotland) SCO	Ian Cameron	17	2	11	0	1	0	4	2	1	0
	MF	(Scotland) SCO	Bobby Connor	45	0	33	0	5	0	5	0	2	0
	FW	(Scotland) SCO	Davie Dodds	2	0	1	0	0	0	1	0	0	0
	FW	(Netherlands) NED	Hans Gillhaus	24	11	20	8	4	3	0	0	0	0
	MF	(Scotland) SCO	Brian Grant	43	8	31	6	5	1	5	0	2	1
	DF	(Scotland) SCO	Scott Harvie	2	0	2	0	0	0	0	0	0	0
	DF	(Scotland) SCO	Brian Irvine	40	3	31	1	5	2	3	0	1	0
	FW	(Scotland) SCO	Eoin Jess	16	3	11	3	1	0	3	0	1	0
	MF	(England) ENG	Paul Mason	46	15	34	9	5	1	5	5	2	0
	DF	(Scotland) SCO	Stewart McKimmie	45	0	33	0	5	0	5	0	2	0
	DF	(Scotland) SCO	Alex McLeish	43	0	32	0	5	0	4	0	2	0
	DF	(Scotland) SCO	Willie Miller (c)	22	0	15	0	0	0	5	0	2	0
	GK	(England) ENG	Bobby Mimms	8	0	6	0	2	0	0	0	0	0
	FW	(Scotland) SCO	Charlie Nicholas	45	13	33	11	5	2	5	0	2	0
	MF	(Scotland) SCO	Craig Robertson	27	3	22	2	2	0	1	0	2	1
	DF	(Scotland) SCO	David Robertson	27	2	20	1	2	0	5	1	0	0
	DF	(Scotland) SCO	Ian Robertson	7	0	5	0	2	0	0	0	0	0
	MF	(Scotland) SCO	Neil Simpson	12	0	9	0	1	0	1	0	1	0
	GK	(Netherlands) NED	Theo Snelders	32	0	23	0	2	0	5	0	2	0
	FW	(Netherlands) NED	Willem van der Ark	35	0	27	0	3	0	3	0	2	0
	DF	(Scotland) SCO	Graham Watson	6	1	4	1	2	0	0	0	0	0
	DF	(Scotland) SCO	Gregg Watson	4	0	4	0	0	0	0	0	0	0
	GK	(Scotland) SCO	Michael Watt	8	0	7	0	1	0	0	0	0	0
	DF	(Scotland) SCO	Stephen Wright	1	0	1	0	0	0	0	0	0	0
