= 1990 Scottish Cup final =

1990 Scottish Cup Final
- Event: 1989–90 Scottish Cup
Aberdeen	Celtic
0	0
- (after extra time) (Aberdeen won 9–8 on penalties)
- Date: 12 May 1990
- Venue: Hampden Park, Glasgow
- Referee: George Smith
- Attendance: 60,493

The 1990 Scottish Cup Final was the 105th final of the Scottish Cup, Scottish football's most prestigious knock-out association football competition. The match took place at Hampden Park on 12 May 1990 and was contested by Scottish Premier Division clubs Aberdeen and Celtic. It was Aberdeen's 13th and Celtic's 45th Scottish Cup Final. The clubs had previously met at the same stage of the tournament on five occasions. Celtic were the defending champions of the competition from the previous two seasons having defeated Rangers and Dundee United respectively.

As Scottish Premier Division clubs, Aberdeen and Celtic both entered the competition in the third round. Aberdeen won all of their four fixtures before the final on their first attempt whilst Celtic needed one replay to see off Premier Division club Dunfermline Athletic in the quarter-finals. Aberdeen knocked out Division One clubs Partick Thistle and Morton before defeating Premier Division clubs Heart of Midlothian and Dundee United before the final. Celtic also defeated two Division One clubs as well as Old Firm and Premier Division rivals Rangers in the fourth round.

The match was Celtic's 45th appearance in the final while it was Aberdeen's 13th. Both clubs had met in the final on five occasions beforehand in 1937, 1954, 1967, 1970 and 1984 with Celtic winning three over Aberdeen's two. Celtic had previously won the tournament 29 times whilst Aberdeen only six times, four coming in the previous nine seasons. Aberdeen were favourites to win the match on this occasion having finished well ahead of Celtic in the league, and having beaten the Glasgow side 3–1 at Parkhead a mere ten days earlier.

Aberdeen won the match 9–8 on penalties after a 0–0 draw over 90 minutes of normal play and 30 minutes of extra-time. With the shoot-out poised at 3-4 Celtic bound striker Charlie Nicholas was required to score to send the shoot-out to Sudden Death. After a further 8 consecutive successful penalty kicks Celtic's Anton Rogan missed the penultimate kick, allowing Brian Irvine to win the tie and claim Aberdeen's seventh Scottish Cup victory.

== Route to the final ==
Aberdeen				Round	Celtic			
Home team	Score	Away team	Aberdeen scorer(s)	Round	Home team	Score	Away team	Celtic scorer(s)
Partick Thistle	2 – 6	Aberdeen	Van der Ark; Mason; Grant; Robertson	Round Three	Forfar Athletic	1 – 2	Celtic	Morris; Dziekanowski
Aberdeen	2 – 1	Greenock Morton	Gillhaus; Nicholas	Round Four	Celtic	1 – 0	Rangers	Coyne
Aberdeen	4 – 1	Hearts	Bett 7'; McKimmie 71'; Irvine 75'; Nicholas 84'	Quarter-finals	Dunfermline Athletic	0 – 0	Celtic	None
Aberdeen	4 – 1	Hearts	Bett 7'; McKimmie 71'; Irvine 75'; Nicholas 84'	Replay	Celtic	3 – 0	Dunfermline Athletic	McStay; Coyne; Miller
Aberdeen	4 – 0	Dundee United	Irvine; Gillhaus (o.g.) (o.g.)	Semi-finals	Celtic	2 – 0	Clydebank	Walker

== Match details ==
12 May 1990

Aberdeen	0–0 (a.e.t.)	Celtic
	Report
Penalties
Bett (penalty scored); Connor (penalty scored); Gillhaus (penalty scored); Grant (penalty missed); Nicholas (penalty scored); McLeish (penalty scored); McKimmie (penalty scored); Robertson (penalty scored); Watson (penalty scored); Irvine (penalty scored)	9–8	(penalty missed) Wdowczyk; (penalty scored) Grant; (penalty scored) McStay; (penalty scored) Coyne; (penalty scored) Galloway; (penalty scored) Miller; (penalty scored) Whyte; (penalty scored) Elliott; (penalty scored) Dziekanowski; (penalty missed) Rogan

Hampden Park, Glasgow
Attendance: 60,493
Referee: George Smith

ABERDEEN:
GK	1	(Netherlands) Theo Snelders
DF	2	(Scotland) Stewart McKimmie
DF	5	(Scotland) Alex McLeish (c)
DF	6	(Scotland) Brian Irvine
DF	3	(Scotland) David Robertson
MF	9	(England) Paul Mason	(substituted off) 105'
MF	4	(Scotland) Brian Grant
MF	8	(Scotland) Jim Bett
MF	10	(Scotland) Bobby Connor
FW	7	(Scotland) Charlie Nicholas
FW	11	(Netherlands) Hans Gillhaus
Substitutes:
DF		(Scotland) Graham Watson	(substituted on) 105'
MF		(Scotland) Eoin Jess
Manager:
(Scotland) Alex Smith			(Scotland) Jocky Scott

CELTIC:
GK	1	(Republic of Ireland) Pat Bonner
DF	2	(Poland) Dariusz Wdowczyk
DF	5	(England) Paul Elliott
DF	6	(Scotland) Derek Whyte
DF	3	(Northern Ireland) Anton Rogan
MF	7	(Scotland) Billy Stark	(substituted off) 90'
MF	4	(Scotland) Peter Grant
MF	8	(Scotland) Paul McStay (c)
FW	11	(Scotland) Joe Miller
FW	10	(Scotland) Andy Walker	(substituted off) 100'
FW	9	(Poland) Dariusz Dziekanowski
Substitutes:
MF		(Scotland) Mike Galloway	(substituted on) 90'
FW		(Republic of Ireland) Tommy Coyne	(substituted on) 100'
Manager:
(Scotland) Billy McNeill
