= 1990–91 Aberdeen F.C. season =

Aberdeen F.C.
1990–91 season
- Chairman: Dick Donald
- Manager: Alex Smith; Jocky Scott
- Scottish Premier Division: 2nd
- Scottish Cup: Third round
- Scottish League Cup: Semi final
- European Cup Winners' Cup: Second round
- Top goalscorer: League: Hans Gillhaus (14); All: Hans Gillhaus (15); Eoin Jess (15)
- Highest home attendance: 24,000 vs. Rangers, 6 October 1990
- Lowest home attendance: 7,500 vs. New Salamis, 3 October 1990
- Average home league attendance: 15,553
Home colours

Aberdeen F.C. competed in the Scottish Premier Division, Scottish League Cup, Scottish Cup and European Cup Winners' Cup in season 1990–91.

== Overview ==
The 1990–91 season finished on a low note for Aberdeen, as they led the championship going into the final day of the season but lost to Rangers, which gave the opposition the league title. Aberdeen's defence of the Scottish Cup ended at the first hurdle when eventual winners Motherwell defeated them at Pittodrie in January 1991. In the League Cup, Aberdeen lost to Rangers in the semi-final, while in the European Cup Winners' Cup, they lost at the second round stage to Polish club Legia Warsaw. Hans Gillhaus and Eoin Jess finished as joint top scorers with 15 goals each.

== Results ==
=== Scottish Premier Division ===
Match Day	Date	Opponent	H/A	Score	Aberdeen Scorer(s)	Attendance
1	25 August	Hibernian	H	2–0	Connor, Gillhaus	15,500
2	1 September	Celtic	A	3–0	Connor, Gillhaus, Mason	45,222
3	8 September	Dunfermline Athletic	A	1–1	D. Robertson	10,200
4	15 September	Dundee United	H	1–1	Bett	15,500
5	22 September	St Mirren	H	2–1	Irvine, Bett	12,500
6	29 September	St Johnstone	A	0–5		8,711
7	6 October	Rangers	H	0–0		24,000
8	13 October	Motherwell	A	0–0		6,602
9	20 October	Heart of Midlothian	H	3–0	Grant, Bett, Gillhaus	14,800
10	27 October	Hibernian	A	1–1	Gillhaus	10,500
11	3 November	Celtic	H	3–0	Jess (2), Gillhaus	21,500
12	10 November	St Mirren	A	4–0	Jess, Gillhaus, Grant, C. Robertson	7,638
13	17 November	St Johnstone	H	0–0		16,000
14	24 November	Dundee United	A	3–2	Jess (3)	12,344
15	1 December	Dunfermline Athletic	H	3–2	Irvine, Mason, Gillhaus	12,000
16	8 December	Heart of Midlothian	A	0–1		9,811
17	15 December	Motherwell	H	1–1	Jess	9,500
18	22 December	Rangers	A	2–2	Bett	37,998
19	26 December	St Mirren	H	1–0	Jess	8,755
20	2 January	Dundee United	H	0–1		19,000
21	5 January	Dunfermline Athletic	A	4–1	Jess (4)	7,422
22	12 January	Hibernian	H	2–0	Cameron, Booth	13,500
23	19 January	Celtic	A	0–1		18,187
24	2 February	Heart of Midlothian	H	5–0	Booth (2), Connor, Gillhaus, Mason	9,500
25	13 February	St Johnstone	A	1–0	Booth	7,046
26	2 March	Rangers	H	1–0	Gillhaus	22,500
27	5 March	Motherwell	A	2–0	Wright, Bett	5,567
28	13 March	Dunfermline Athletic	H	0–0		10,400
29	23 March	Dundee United	A	2–1	van der Ark, Gillhaus	10,643
30	30 March	Hibernian	A	4–2	Booth, Gillhaus (3)	7,400
31	6 April	Celtic	H	1–0	Jess	22,500
32	13 April	Heart of Midlothian	A	4–1	McKimmie, Connor (2), Gillhaus	16,771
33	20 April	Motherwell	H	3–0	van der Ark (2), Connor	14,500
34	27 April	St Mirren	A	1–0	Bett	8,513
35	4 May	St Johnstone	H	2–1	Booth, van der Ark	18,000
36	11 May	Rangers	A	0–2		37,652

==== Final standings ====
Pos	Team	Pld	W	D	L	GF	GA	GD	Pts	Qualification or relegation
1	Rangers (C)	36	24	7	5	62	23	+39	55	Qualification for the European Cup first round
2	Aberdeen	36	22	9	5	62	27	+35	53	Qualification for the UEFA Cup first round
3	Celtic	36	17	7	12	52	38	+14	41	Qualification for the UEFA Cup first round
4	Dundee United	36	17	7	12	41	29	+12	41	
5	Heart of Midlothian	36	14	7	15	48	55	−7	35	

Source: Statto.com
Rules for classification: 1) points; 2) goal difference; 3) number of goals scored.
(C) Champions

=== Scottish League Cup ===
Round	Date	Opponent	H/A	Score	Aberdeen Scorer(s)	Attendance
R2	21 August	Queen's Park	A	2–1	Jess, Bett	2,201
R3	29 August	Stranraer	H	4–0	Irvine, Van de Ven, Mason (2)	10,000
QF	5 September	Heart of Midlothian	H	3–0	Van de Ven, Bett, Mason	15,500
SF	26 September	Rangers	N	0–1		40,855

=== Scottish Cup ===
Round	Date	Opponent	H/A	Score	Aberdeen Scorer(s)	Attendance
R3	26 January	Motherwell	H	0–1		15,000

=== European Cup Winners' Cup ===
Round	Date	Opponent	H/A	Score	Aberdeen Scorer(s)	Attendance
R1 L1	19 September	(Cyprus) New Salamis	A	2–0	Mason, Gillhaus	7,000
R1 L2	3 October	(Cyprus) New Salamis	H	3–0	Own goal, C. Robertson, Jess	7,500
R2 L1	24 October	(Poland) Legia Warsaw	H	0–0		16,000
R2 L2	7 November	(Poland) Legia Warsaw	A	0–1		5,665

== Squad ==
=== Appearances & Goals ===
No.	Pos	Nat	Player	Total		Premier Division		Scottish Cup		League Cup		Europe	
No.	Pos	Nat	Player	Apps	Goals	Apps	Goals	Apps	Goals	Apps	Goals	Apps	Goals
	MF	(Scotland) SCO	Jim Bett	44	9	36	7	1	0	3	2	4	0
	FW	(Scotland) SCO	Scott Booth	22	6	19	6	1	0	1	0	1	0
	MF	(Scotland) SCO	Ian Cameron	12	1	10	1	1	0	1	0	0	0
	MF	(Scotland) SCO	Bobby Connor	37	6	29	6	1	0	4	0	3	0
	GK	(Wales) WAL	Andy Dibble	5	0	5	0	0	0	0	0	0	0
	MF	(Scotland) SCO	Lee Gardner	1	0	0	0	0	0	0	0	1	0
	FW	(Netherlands) NED	Hans Gillhaus	43	15	35	14	1	0	3	0	4	1
	MF	(Scotland) SCO	Brian Grant	39	2	32	2	0	0	4	0	3	0
	DF	(Scotland) SCO	Brian Irvine	38	3	29	2	1	0	4	1	4	0
	MF	(Scotland) SCO	Eoin Jess	35	15	27	13	1	0	4	1	3	1
	MF	(England) ENG	Paul Mason	35	7	26	3	1	0	4	3	4	1
	DF	(Scotland) SCO	Stewart McKimmie	33	1	25	1	0	0	4	0	4	0
	DF	(Scotland) SCO	Alex McLeish (c)	41	0	33	0	1	0	3	0	4	0
	DF	(Scotland) SCO	Willie Miller (c)	1	0	0	0	1	0	0	0	0	0
	MF	(Scotland) SCO	Craig Robertson	11	2	8	1	0	0	1	0	2	1
	DF	(Scotland) SCO	David Robertson	44	1	35	1	1	0	4	0	4	0
	DF	(Scotland) SCO	Ian Robertson	1	0	1	0	0	0	0	0	0	0
	GK	(Netherlands) NED	Theo Snelders	28	0	21	0	1	0	4	0	2	0
	MF	(Netherlands) NED	Peter van de Ven	41	2	32	0	1	0	4	2	4	0
	FW	(Netherlands) NED	Willem van der Ark	11	4	11	4	0	0	0	0	0	0
	DF	(Scotland) SCO	Gregg Watson	9	0	7	0	0	0	1	0	1	0
	GK	(Scotland) SCO	Michael Watt	12	0	10	0	0	0	0	0	2	0
	DF	(Scotland) SCO	Stephen Wright	19	1	18	1	1	0	0	0	0	0
