= 1988–89 Aberdeen F.C. season =

Aberdeen F.C.
1988–89 season
- Chairman: Dick Donald
- Manager: Alex Smith; Jocky Scott
- Scottish Premier Division: 2nd
- Scottish Cup: Fourth round
- Scottish League Cup: Runner-up
- UEFA Cup: First round
- Top goalscorer: League: Charlie Nicholas (16); All: Charlie Nicholas (18)
- Highest home attendance: 23,000 vs. Dundee United, 18 February 1989
- Lowest home attendance: 6,500 vs. Motherwell, 6 May 1989
- Average home league attendance: 14,130

Aberdeen F.C. competed in the Scottish Premier Division, Scottish League Cup, Scottish Cup and UEFA Cup in season 1988–89.

== Overview ==
Aberdeen began the season under new management. Alex Smith and Jocky Scott were appointed as co-managers after the resignation of Ian Porterfield during the summer. New signings included Paul Mason and Theo Snelders from FC Groningen and FC Twente respectively.

Aberdeen finished second in the League behind Rangers, and reached the final of the League Cup, which they lost to Rangers after extra time. In the Scottish Cup, they lost in the fourth round to Dundee United, and in Europe, they lost to East German club Dynamo Dresden in the first round of the UEFA Cup.

== Results ==
=== Scottish Premier Division ===
Match Day	Date	Opponent	H/A	Score	Aberdeen Scorer(s)	Attendance
1	13 August	Dundee	A	1–1	Dodds	12,222
2	20 August	St Mirren	H	1–1	Connor	12,046
3	27 August	Dundee United	A	2–2	Bett, Hewitt	14,735
4	3 September	Hibernian	H	0–0		14,000
5	17 September	Celtic	A	3–1	Grant, Bett, Dodds	37,769
6	24 September	Heart of Midlothian	H	1–0	Nicholas	14,000
7	27 September	Hamilton Academical	A	1–0	Connor	3,634
8	1 October	Motherwell	A	1–1	Miller	4,225
9	8 October	Rangers	H	2–1	Nicholas, Bett	22,370
10	12 October	St Mirren	A	1–1	Dodds	4,287
11	29 October	Heart of Midlothian	A	1–1	Whittaker (own goal)	12,644
12	2 November	Celtic	H	2–2	Nicholas, Dodds	22,000
13	5 November	Hibernian	A	2–1	Nicholas (2)	11,500
14	12 November	Dundee United	H	1–1	Mason	15,184
15	16 November	Dundee	H	1–0	Wright	11,181
16	19 November	Motherwell	H	2–1	Nicholas, Hewitt	10,028
17	26 November	Rangers	A	0–1		42,239
18	3 December	Hamilton Academical	H	1–1	Nicholas	8,324
19	10 December	Celtic	A	0–0		42,437
20	17 December	St Mirren	H	3–1	Irvine, C. Robertson, Hewitt	8,500
21	31 December	Dundee	A	0–2		9,828
22	3 January	Dundee United	A	1–1	Nicholas	17,952
23	7 January	Hibernian	H	2–0	Nicholas (2)	13,500
24	14 January	Rangers	H	1–2	Nicholas	22,000
25	21 January	Motherwell	A	2–0	Connor, van der Ark	5,906
26	14 February	Hamilton Academical	A	2–0	Wright, Nicholas	2,016
27	25 February	Heart of Midlothian	H	3–0	Wright (2), Irvine	15,000
28	11 March	Dundee	H	2–0	Nicholas, Wright	11,800
29	25 March	St Mirren	A	3–1	Nicholas, Wright, Mason	7,541
30	1 April	Dundee United	H	1–0	Nicholas	16,700
31	8 April	Hibernian	A	2–1	Bett, Mason	11,000
32	15 April	Hamilton Academical	H	3–0	Nicholas (2), Mason	9,712
33	22 April	Heart of Midlothian	A	0–1		13,367
34	29 April	Celtic	H	0–0		21,500
35	6 May	Motherwell	H	0–0		6,500
36	13 May	Rangers	A	3–0	van der Ark, Wright, Bett	42,480

==== Final standings ====
Pos	Team	Pld	W	D	L	GF	GA	GD	Pts	Qualification or relegation
1	Rangers (C)	36	26	4	6	62	26	+36	56	Qualification for the European Cup first round
2	Aberdeen	36	18	14	4	51	25	+26	50	Qualification for the UEFA Cup first round
3	Celtic	36	21	4	11	66	44	+22	46	Qualification for the Cup Winners' Cup first round
4	Dundee United	36	16	12	8	44	26	+18	44	Qualification for the UEFA Cup first round
5	Hibernian	36	13	9	14	37	36	+1	35	Qualification for the UEFA Cup first round

Source: Statto
Rules for classification: 1) points; 2) goal difference; 3) number of goals scored.
(C) Champions

=== Scottish League Cup ===
Round	Date	Opponent	H/A	Score	Aberdeen Scorer(s)	Attendance
R2	17 August	Arbroath	H	4–0	Miller (2), Bett, Hewitt	9,139
R3	23 August	Morton	A	2–1	Bett (2)	3,131
QF	31 August	Hibernian	A	2–1	Nicholas, Grant	13,500
SF	20 September	Dundee United	N	2–0	Dodds, Hewitt	18,491
F	23 October	Rangers	N	2–3	Dodds (2)	72,122

=== Scottish Cup ===
Round	Date	Opponent	H/A	Score	Aberdeen Scorer(s)	Attendance
R3	28 January	Dunfermline Athletic	A	0–0		16,656
R3 R	1 February	Dunfermline Athletic	H	3–1	Wright (2), Nicholas	21,500
R4	18 February	Dundee United	H	1–1	Connor	23,000
R4 R	22 February	Dundee United	A	1–1	Grant	18,756
R4 R2	27 February	Dundee United	A	0–1		21,095

=== UEFA Cup ===
Round	Date	Opponent	H/A	Score	Aberdeen Scorer(s)	Attendance
R1 L1	7 September	(East Germany) Dynamo Dresden	H	0–0		14,500
R1 L2	5 October	(East Germany) Dynamo Dresden	A	0–2		36,000

== Squad ==
=== Appearances & Goals ===
No.	Pos	Nat	Player	Total		Premier Division		Scottish Cup		League Cup		Europe	
No.	Pos	Nat	Player	Apps	Goals	Apps	Goals	Apps	Goals	Apps	Goals	Apps	Goals
	MF	(Scotland) SCO	Jim Bett	43	8	31	5	5	0	5	3	2	0
	MF	(Scotland) SCO	Bobby Connor	48	5	36	4	5	1	5	0	2	0
	FW	(Scotland) SCO	Davie Dodds	34	7	23	4	4	0	5	3	2	0
	MF	(Scotland) SCO	Brian Grant	33	3	27	1	3	1	2	1	1	0
	MF	(Scotland) SCO	Stevie Gray	5	0	4	0	0	0	1	0	0	0
	FW	(Scotland) SCO	John Hewitt	35	5	27	3	2	0	5	2	1	0
	DF	(Scotland) SCO	Brian Irvine	35	2	27	2	5	0	3	0	0	0
	FW	(Scotland) SCO	Eoin Jess	2	0	2	0	0	0	0	0	0	0
	MF	(Scotland) SCO	Andy MacLeod	1	0	1	0	0	0	0	0	0	0
	MF	(England) ENG	Paul Mason	33	4	28	4	1	0	2	0	2	0
	DF	(Scotland) SCO	Stewart McKimmie	47	0	35	0	5	0	5	0	2	0
	DF	(Scotland) SCO	Alex McLeish	46	0	34	0	5	0	5	0	2	0
	DF	(Scotland) SCO	Willie Miller (c)	29	3	22	1	0	0	5	2	2	0
	FW	(Scotland) SCO	Charlie Nicholas	37	18	28	16	5	1	3	1	1	0
	MF	(Scotland) SCO	Craig Robertson	5	1	4	1	1	0	0	0	0	0
	DF	(Scotland) SCO	David Robertson	30	0	23	0	0	0	5	0	2	0
	DF	(Scotland) SCO	Ian Robertson	12	0	7	0	5	0	0	0	0	0
	MF	(Scotland) SCO	Neil Simpson	28	0	16	0	5	0	5	0	2	0
	GK	(Netherlands) NED	Theo Snelders	48	0	36	0	5	0	5	0	2	0
	FW	(Netherlands) NED	Willem van der Ark	9	2	8	2	1	0	0	0	0	0
	DF	(Scotland) SCO	Gregg Watson	4	0	4	0	0	0	0	0	0	0
	FW	(Scotland) SCO	Paul Wright	28	8	22	6	4	2	1	0	1	0
