= 1992 Scottish League Cup final =

- Event: 1992–93 Scottish League Cup
Aberdeen	Rangers
1	2
- Date: 25 October 1992
- Venue: Hampden Park, Glasgow
- Referee: Dougie Hope
- Attendance: 45,298

The 1992 Scottish League Cup final was played on 25 October 1992 at Hampden Park in Glasgow and was the final of the 47th Scottish League Cup competition. The final was contested by Aberdeen and Rangers. Rangers won the match 2–1 thanks to goals from Stuart McCall and a Gary Smith own goal. The teams would play again in the 1993 Scottish Cup Final at the end of the season, with the same scoreline.

== Match details ==
25 October 1992

Aberdeen	1 – 2 (a.e.t.)	Rangers
Shearer 62'	Report	McCall 14'; Smith 114' (o.g.)

Hampden Park, Glasgow
Attendance: 45,298
Referee: Dougie Hope

=== Teams ===
ABERDEEN :
GK	(Netherlands) Theo Snelders
RB	(Scotland) Stephen Wright
CB	(Scotland) David Winnie
CB	(Scotland) Alex McLeish (c)
LB	(Scotland) Gary Smith
RM	(Scotland) Brian Grant
CM	(Scotland) Jim Bett	(substituted off) 61'
CM	(Scotland) Roy Aitken	(substituted off) 25'
LM	(Scotland) Eoin Jess
CF	(Finland) Mixu Paatelainen
CF	(Scotland) Duncan Shearer
Substitutes:
MF	(England) Lee Richardson	(substituted on) 25'
MF	(Scotland) Scott Booth	(substituted on) 61'
Managers:
(Scotland) Willie Miller

RANGERS :
GK	(Scotland) Andy Goram
RB	(Scotland) Stuart McCall
CB	(Scotland) Richard Gough (c)	(substituted off) 64'
CB	(Scotland) Dave McPherson
LB	(Scotland) John Brown
RM	(England) Trevor Steven	(substituted off) 57'
CM	(Scotland) Ian Durrant
CM	(Scotland) Ian Ferguson
LM	(Scotland) David Robertson
CF	(Scotland) Ally McCoist
CF	(England) Mark Hateley
Substitutes:
MF	(England) Dale Gordon	(substituted on) 57'
MF	(Ukraine) Alexei Mikhailichenko	(substituted on) 64'
Manager:
(Scotland) Walter Smith

== See also ==
- Aberdeen F.C.–Rangers F.C. rivalry
