= 1989 Scottish League Cup final =

- Event: 1989–90 Scottish League Cup
| Aberdeen | Rangers |
| 2 | 1 |
- Date: 22 October 1989
- Venue: Hampden Park, Glasgow
- Referee: George Smith
- Attendance: 61,190

The 1989 Scottish League Cup final was played on 22 October 1989 at Hampden Park in Glasgow and was the final of the 44th Scottish League Cup competition (Skol Cup). The final was contested by Aberdeen and Rangers for the third season in succession, with Rangers winning the previous two.

Aberdeen won the match 2–1 thanks to a Paul Mason double.

== Match details ==
22 October 1989

| Aberdeen | 2–1 (a.e.t.) | Rangers |
|---|---|---|
| Mason 22', 103' | Report | Walters 35' (pen.) |

Hampden Park, Glasgow
Attendance: 61,190
Referee: George Smith

ABERDEEN :
| GK | Theo Snelders |
| RB | Stewart McKimmie |
| CB | Alex McLeish |
| CB | Willie Miller (c) |
| LB | David Robertson |
| RM | Bobby Connor |
| CM | Eoin Jess | (substituted off) 1' |
| CM | Jim Bett |
| LM | Brian Grant | (substituted off) 2' |
| CF | Charlie Nicholas |
| CF | Paul Mason |
Substitutes:
| DF | Brian Irvine | (substituted in) 1' |
| FW | Willem van der Ark | (substituted in) 2' |
Managers:
Alex Smith; Jocky Scott

RANGERS :
| GK | Chris Woods |
| RB | Gary Stevens |
| CB | Richard Gough |
| CB | Terry Butcher (c) |
| LB | Stuart Munro |
| RM | Trevor Steven |
| CM | Ian Ferguson |
| CM | Ray Wilkins |
| LM | Mark Walters | (substituted off) 1' |
| CF | Ally McCoist |
| CF | Mo Johnston |
Substitutes:
| MF | Ian McCall | (substituted in) 1' |
| DF | John Brown |
Manager:
Graeme Souness

== See also ==
- Aberdeen F.C.–Rangers F.C. rivalry
