= Brian Irvine (footballer) =

Scottish footballer and manager

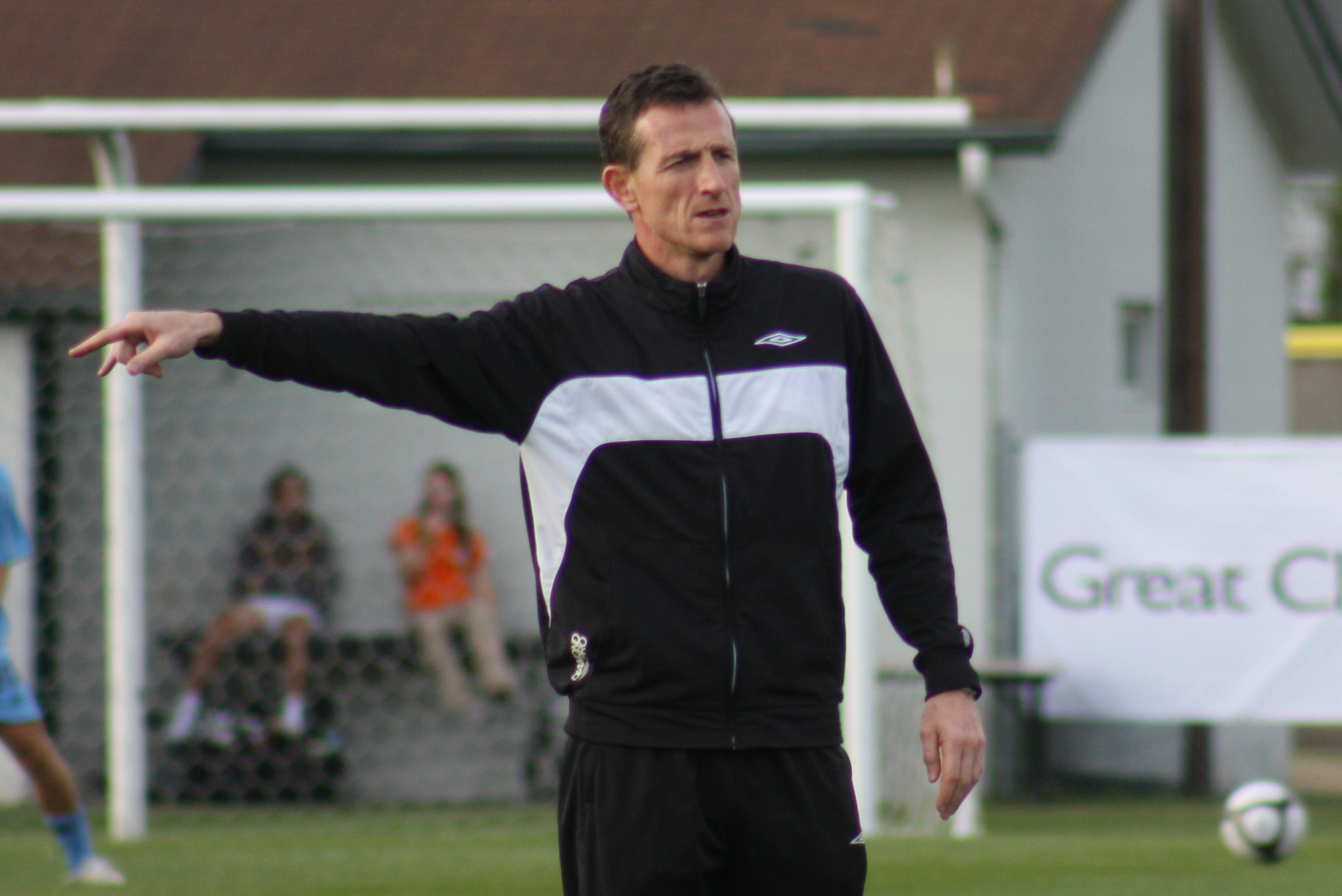

Personal information
- Date of birth: 24 May 1965 (age 61)
- Place of birth: Bellshill, Scotland
- Height: 6 ft 2 in (1.88 m)
- Position: Central defender

Senior career*
Years	Team	Apps	(Gls)
1983–1985	Falkirk	38	(0)
1985–1997	Aberdeen	311	(30)
1997–1999	Dundee	69	(4)
1999–2003	Ross County	119	(13)
Total		537	(47)

International career
1990–1994	Scotland	9	(0)

Managerial career
- 2006: Elgin City
- * Club domestic league appearances and goals

Brian Irvine (born 24 May 1965 in Bellshill, Scotland) is a former international footballer who played as a central defender for Falkirk, Aberdeen, Dundee, Ross County and managed Elgin City. He was capped nine times by Scotland.

== Career ==
After working in a bank on leaving school, Irvine began his professional career with Falkirk in 1983, aged 18. During his spell with the Bairns, he became an evangelical Christian.

After two years and nearly forty league appearances at Brockville, Irvine moved to Aberdeen, the team he had supported as a child, for a fee of £110,000. During twelve years with the Dons, Irvine made over 350 appearances in all competitions, gradually becoming a regular in the defence alongside Alex McLeish as veteran captain Willie Miller's career came to an end.

Aberdeen won the Scottish Cup in 1990, with Irvine scoring the winning penalty in a 9–8 shootout win against Celtic in the final, having also scored in the quarter-final and semi-final. He had already come on as a substitute in the League Cup final victory in the same season, and played a part in two other finals and five runners-up finishes in the Scottish Premier Division (losing out to Rangers on every occasion), as well as helping the club avoid what would have been a first-ever relegation via a play-off in 1995. He took over in goals in emergencies (if the goalkeeper was injured or sent off) on several occasions, saving a penalty in a match against Hibernian in 1991.

In June 1995 he was diagnosed with multiple sclerosis, returning to action four months after the diagnosis. Irvine left Pittodrie in 1997 (following a testimonial match against Wimbledon) and moved to Dundee, featuring nearly 70 times in two years. In 1999, Irvine moved to Ross County, where he finished his playing career in 2003.

== Coaching career / later work ==
After retiring, Irvine stayed with County as a coach, taking his first managerial job in January 2006 with Elgin City. In December that year, with the club bottom of the table, Irvine left the club. In March 2009, Irvine was named assistant manager to Martin Rennie of USL First Division side Carolina RailHawks FC. He was previously Rennie's assistant at USL-2 side Cleveland City Stars.

He has been involved in charity work, and in 2016 became a police officer.

== Career statistics ==
=== Club ===
Appearances and goals by club, season and competition
Club	Season	League			Scottish Cup		League Cup		Europe		Other		Total	
Club	Season	Division	Apps	Goals	Apps	Goals	Apps	Goals	Apps	Goals	Apps	Goals	Apps	Goals
Falkirk	1983–84	Scottish First Division	3	0	0	0	0	0	0	0	-	-	3	0
Falkirk	1984–85	Scottish First Division	35	0	2	0	1	0	0	0	-	-	38	0
Falkirk	Total		38	0	2	0	1	0	0	0	-	-	41	0
Aberdeen	1985–86	Scottish Premier Division	1	0	0	0	0	0	0	0	-	-	1	0
Aberdeen	1986–87	Scottish Premier Division	20	3	0	0	2	0	1	0	-	-	23	3
Aberdeen	1987–88	Scottish Premier Division	17	1	1	0	4	2	1	0	-	-	23	3
Aberdeen	1988–89	Scottish Premier Division	27	2	5	0	3	0	1	0	-	-	36	2
Aberdeen	1989–90	Scottish Premier Division	31	1	5	2	3	0	1	0	-	-	40	3
Aberdeen	1990–91	Scottish Premier Division	30	2	1	0	4	1	4	0	-	-	39	3
Aberdeen	1991–92	Scottish Premier Division	41	4	1	0	2	0	2	0	-	-	46	4
Aberdeen	1992–93	Scottish Premier Division	39	5	6	2	3	1	0	0	-	-	48	8
Aberdeen	1993–94	Scottish Premier Division	42	7	6	0	2	0	4	1	-	-	54	8
Aberdeen	1994–95	Scottish Premier Division	19	1	1	0	2	0	2	0	-	-	24	1
Aberdeen	1995–96	Scottish Premier Division	18	3	3	0	0	0	0	0	-	-	21	3
Aberdeen	1996–97	Scottish Premier Division	26	1	0	0	1	0	5	1	-	-	32	2
Aberdeen	Total		311	30	29	4	26	4	21	2	-	-	387	40
Dundee	1997–98	Scottish First Division	36	1	5	0	2	1	0	0	1	0	44	2
Dundee	1998–99	SPL	33	3	0	0	1	0	0	0	-	-	34	3
Dundee	Total		69	4	5	0	3	1	0	0	1	0	78	5
Ross County	1999–2000	Scottish Second Division	32	6	2	1	2	1	0	0	3	2	39	10
Ross County	2000–01	Scottish First Division	26	2	2	0	2	0	0	0	2	0	32	2
Ross County	2001–02	Scottish First Division	30	2	1	0	4	1	0	0	1	0	36	3
Ross County	2002–03	Scottish First Division	31	3	1	0	3	0	0	0	1	0	36	3
Ross County	Total		119	13	6	1	11	2	0	0	7	2	143	18
Career total			537	47	42	5	41	7	21	2	8	2	651	63

=== International ===
Appearances and goals by national team and year
National team	Year	Apps	Goals
Scotland	1990	1	0
Scotland	1991	—	
Scotland	1992	—	
Scotland	1993	6	0
Scotland	1994	2	0
Total		9	0

=== Managerial record ===
Team	From	To	Record				
Team	From	To	P	W	L	D	Win %
Elgin City	August 2006	December 2006	38	14	2	22	36.84%

== Honours ==
Aberdeen

- Scottish Premier Division: Runners-up 1988–89, 1989–90, 1990–91, 1992–93, 1993–94
- Scottish Cup: 1989–90
  - Runners-up 1992–93
- Scottish League Cup: 1989–90
  - Runners-up 1988–89

== See also ==
- List of footballers in Scotland by number of league appearances (500+)
