= 1989–90 in Scottish football =

Premier Division champions
- Rangers

Division One champions
- St Johnstone

Division Two champions
- Brechin City

Scottish Cup winners
- Aberdeen

League Cup winners
- Aberdeen

Junior Cup winners
- Hill of Beath Hawthorn

Teams in Europe
- Aberdeen, Celtic, Dundee United, Hibernian, Rangers

Scotland national team
- 1990 World Cup qualification, 1990 World Cup
- ← 1988–89 1990–91 →

The 1989–90 season was the 93rd season of competitive football in Scotland.

== Notable events ==
Rangers won their third league title in four seasons under the management of Graeme Souness.

Aberdeen won their first major honours since the departure of Alex Ferguson, winning a cup double of the Scottish Cup and the League Cup.

Celtic finished the season without winning a trophy, mounting the pressure on manager Billy McNeill.

Rangers abandoned their longstanding signing policy by acquiring Mo Johnston, who was the first high-profile Catholic player to sign for Rangers. Johnston joined Rangers after having come close to rejoining his old club Celtic from French club Nantes. Also arriving at Rangers was the Everton and England winger Trevor Steven, filling the gap on the right wing left by club hero David Cooper, who signed for Motherwell.

Rangers had four players – more than any other club – selected for the England World Cup squad. Goalkeeper Chris Woods, defenders Gary Stevens and Terry Butcher, and winger Trevor Steven helped them reach the semi-finals.

== Scottish Premier Division ==
Pos	Team	Pld	W	D	L	GF	GA	GD	Pts	Qualification or relegation
1	Rangers (C)	36	20	11	5	48	19	+29	51	Qualification for the European Cup first round
2	Aberdeen	36	17	10	9	56	33	+23	44	Qualification for the Cup Winners' Cup first round
3	Heart of Midlothian	36	16	12	8	54	35	+19	44	Qualification for the UEFA Cup first round
4	Dundee United	36	11	13	12	36	39	−3	35	Qualification for the UEFA Cup first round
5	Celtic	36	10	14	12	37	37	0	34	
6	Motherwell	36	11	12	13	43	47	−4	34	
7	Hibernian	36	12	10	14	34	41	−7	34	
8	Dunfermline Athletic	36	11	8	17	37	50	−13	30	
9	St Mirren	36	10	10	16	28	48	−20	30	
10	Dundee (R)	36	5	14	17	41	65	−24	24	Relegation to the 1990–91 Scottish First Division

Source: RSSSF
Rules for classification: 1) points; 2) goal difference; 3) number of goals scored.
(C) Champions; (R) Relegated

Champions: Rangers
Relegated: Dundee

== Scottish League Division One ==
Pos	Team	Pld	W	D	L	GF	GA	GD	Pts	Promotion or relegation
1	St Johnstone (C, P)	39	25	8	6	81	39	+42	58	Promotion to the Premier Division
2	Airdrieonians	39	23	8	8	77	45	+32	54	
3	Clydebank	39	17	10	12	74	64	+10	44	
4	Falkirk	39	14	15	10	59	46	+13	43	
5	Raith Rovers	39	15	12	12	57	50	+7	42	
6	Hamilton Academical	39	14	13	12	52	53	−1	41	
7	Meadowbank Thistle	39	13	13	13	41	46	−5	39	
8	Partick Thistle	39	12	14	13	62	53	+9	38	
9	Clyde	39	10	15	14	39	46	−7	35	
10	Ayr United	39	11	13	15	41	62	−21	35	
11	Morton	39	9	16	14	38	46	−8	34	
12	Forfar Athletic	39	8	15	16	51	65	−14	29 (Note: 2 points deducted)	
13	Albion Rovers (R)	39	8	11	20	50	78	−28	27	Relegation to the Second Division
14	Alloa Athletic (R)	39	6	13	20	41	70	−29	25	Relegation to the Second Division

Source: RSSSF and statto
Rules for classification: 1) points; 2) goal difference; 3) number of goals scored.
(C) Champions; (P) Promoted; (R) Relegated
Notes:

Promoted: St Johnstone
Relegated: Albion Rovers, Alloa Athletic

== Scottish League Division Two ==
Pos	Team	Pld	W	D	L	GF	GA	GD	Pts	Promotion
1	Brechin City (C, P)	39	19	11	9	59	44	+15	49	Promotion to the First Division
2	Kilmarnock (P)	39	21	5	13	67	41	+26	47	Promotion to the First Division
3	Stirling Albion	39	20	7	12	73	50	+23	47	
4	Stenhousemuir	39	18	9	12	62	53	+9	45	
5	Berwick Rangers	39	18	5	16	66	57	+9	41	
6	Dumbarton	39	15	10	14	70	73	−3	40	
7	Cowdenbeath	39	13	13	13	58	54	+4	39	
8	Stranraer	39	15	8	16	57	59	−2	38	
9	East Fife	39	12	12	15	60	63	−3	36	
10	Queen of the South	39	11	14	14	58	69	−11	36	
11	Queen's Park	39	13	10	16	40	51	−11	36	
12	Arbroath	39	12	10	17	47	61	−14	34	
13	Montrose	39	10	12	17	53	63	−10	32	
14	East Stirlingshire	39	8	10	21	34	66	−32	26	

Source: "1989-1990 Second Division - SPFL Archive". SPFL.
Rules for classification: 1) points; 2) goal difference; 3) number of goals scored.
(C) Champions; (P) Promoted

Promoted: Brechin City, Kilmarnock

== Other honours ==
=== Cup honours ===
Competition	Winner	Score	Runner-up	Report
Scottish Cup 1989–90	Aberdeen	0–0 (a.e.t.) (9 – 8 pen.)	Celtic	Wikipedia article
League Cup 1989–90	Aberdeen	2–1 (a.e.t.)	Rangers	Wikipedia article
Youth Cup	Hibernian	0–0 (a.e.t.)(4 – 2 (Pen.)	Dundee United	
Junior Cup	Hill of Beath Hawthorn	1–0	Lesmahagow	

==== Senior ====
Competition	Winner
Highland League 1989–90	Elgin City
East of Scotland League	Annan Athletic
South of Scotland League	Girvan

=== Individual honours ===
==== SPFA awards ====
Award	Winner	Club
Players' Player of the Year	(Scotland) Jim Bett	Aberdeen
Young Player of the Year	(Scotland) Scott Crabbe	Heart of Midlothian

==== SFWA awards ====
Award	Winner	Club
Footballer of the Year	(Scotland) Alex McLeish	Aberdeen
Manager of the year	(Scotland) Andy Roxburgh	Scotland

== Scotland national team ==
Date	Venue	Opponents	Score	Competition	Scotland scorer(s)
6 September 1989	Stadion Maksimir, Zagreb (A)	(Socialist Federal Republic of Yugoslavia) Yugoslavia	1–3	WCQG5	Gordon Durie
11 October 1989	Parc des Princes, Paris (A)	France	0–3	WCQG5	
15 November 1989	Hampden Park, Glasgow (H)	Norway	1–1	WCQG5	Ally McCoist
28 March 1990	Hampden Park, Glasgow (H)	Argentina	1–0	Friendly	Stewart McKimmie
25 April 1990	Hampden Park, Glasgow (H)	East Germany	0–1	Friendly	
16 May 1990	Pittodrie, Aberdeen (H)	Egypt	1–3	Friendly	Ally McCoist
19 May 1990	Hampden Park, Glasgow (H)	Poland	1–1	Friendly	Maurice Johnston
28 May 1990	Ta'Qali Stadium, Valletta (A)	Malta	2–1	Friendly	Alan McInally (2)
11 June 1990	Stadio Luigi Ferraris, Genoa (N)	Costa Rica	0–1	WCGC	
16 June 1990	Stadio Luigi Ferraris, Genoa (N)	Sweden	2–1	WCGC	Stuart McCall, Maurice Johnston
20 June 1990	Stadio Delle Alpi, Turin (N)	Brazil	0–1	WCGC	

Key:

- (H) = Home match
- (A) = Away match
- WCQG5 = World Cup qualifying – Group 5
- WCGC = World Cup – Group C

== See also ==
- 1989–90 Aberdeen F.C. season
- 1989–90 Dundee United F.C. season
- 1989–90 Rangers F.C. season
