= Theo Snelders =

Dutch former professional footballer (born 1963)

Personal information
- Full name: Theodorus Antonius Gerardus Snelders
- Date of birth: 7 December 1963 (age 62)
- Place of birth: Westervoort, Netherlands
- Height: 1.93 m (6 ft 4 in)
- Position: Goalkeeper

Senior career*
| Years | Team | Apps | (Gls) |
| 1980–1988 | Twente | 199 | (0) |
| 1988–1996 | Aberdeen | 227 | (0) |
| 1996–1999 | Rangers | 13 | (0) |
| 1999–2001 | MVV | 38 | (0) |
| Total | | 478 | (0) |

International career
| 1989 | Netherlands | 1 | (0) |
| 1990 | Scottish League XI | 1 | (0) |
- * Club domestic league appearances and goals

Theodorus Antonius Gerardus Snelders (born 7 December 1963) is a Dutch former professional footballer who played as a goalkeeper.

== Club career ==
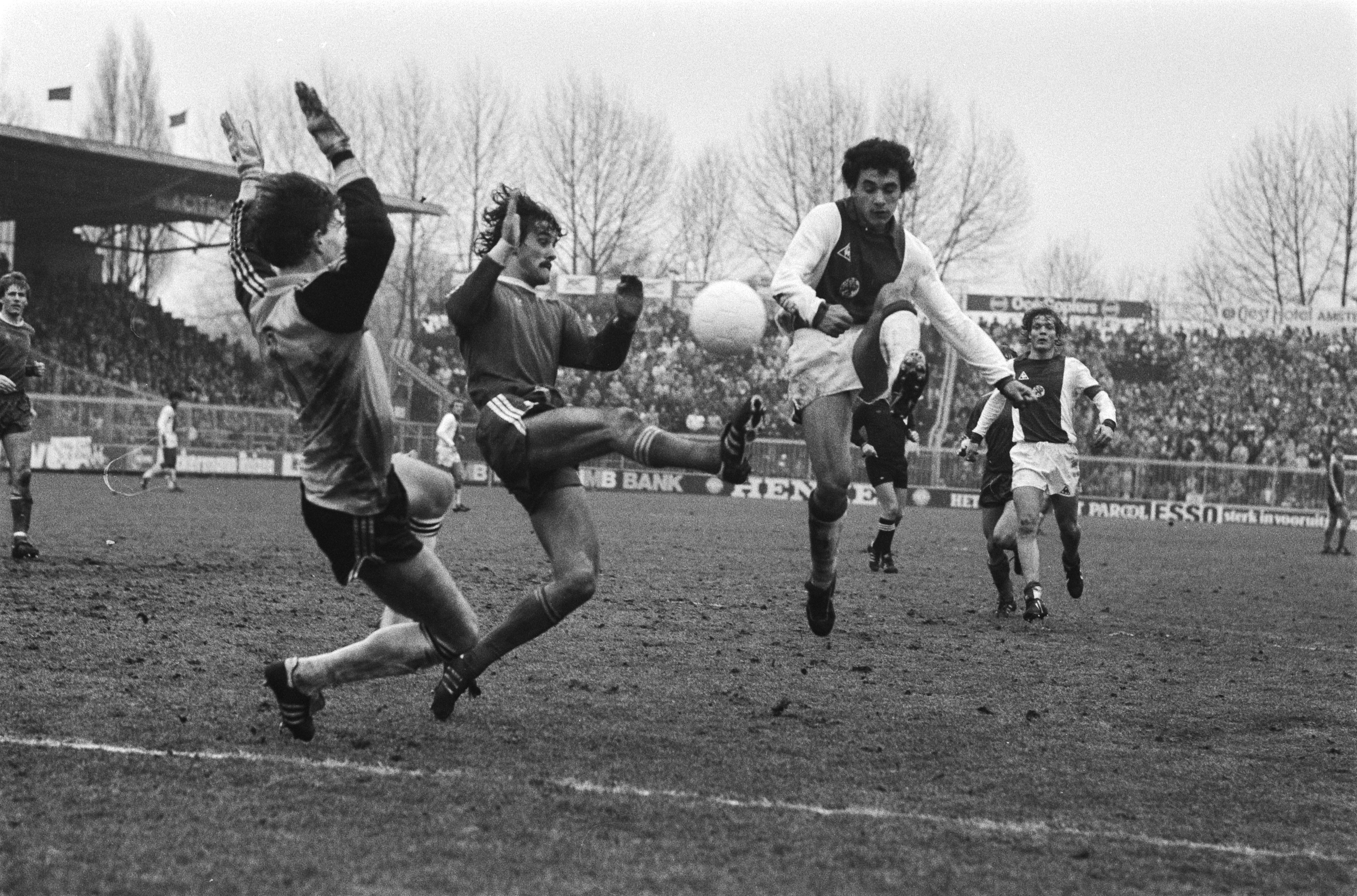
18-year-old Snelders (left) blocking a shot in a match between Ajax and Twente, 1982

Snelders was born in Westervoort, Gelderland. He started his career with Twente, but is mostly remembered in Scotland, especially for his spell at Aberdeen following his move for £300,000 in summer 1988. A successful replacement for Jim Leighton, he had a very good first season at Pittodrie, winning the Scottish PFA Players' Player of the Year in 1989. He saved Anton Rogan's penalty in Aberdeen's penalty shootout win over Celtic in the 1990 Scottish Cup Final.

After fracturing a cheekbone in a collision with Ally McCoist of Rangers in 1991, he was unavailable for the club's vital winner-takes-all match against the Gers in May of that year, with inexperienced understudy Michael Watt unable to prevent a 2–0 defeat. Snelders had also played in the Aberdeen side that beat Rangers to win the 1989 Scottish League Cup Final, but tasted defeat against the same opponents in that tournament's 1988 and 1992 editions and in the 1993 Scottish Cup Final, and was the regular goalkeeper as the Dons finished runners-up to Rangers in five of his seven full league campaigns.

Midway through one of the campaigns, in which the team was not challenging for honours (1991–92), Snelders was sent off for an incident of violent conduct on the pitch; his reaction to a penalty being awarded to Keith Wright of Hibernian was to strike the forward to the head, followed by kicking the ball over the stand and out of the stadium. His makeshift replacement, defender Brian Irvine, saved the spot-kick, only for Aberdeen to miss a penalty of their own and concede the winning goal in the last minute. The other unsuccessful year (1994–95) concluded with a play-off to prevent the club being relegated for the first time in their history, which was averted. He made 290 appearances for the club in all competitions.

Having fallen behind Watt in the Aberdeen order, Snelders moved on to rivals Rangers for £300,000 in early 1996. As a confirmed backup player, initially to Andy Goram followed by Lionel Charbonnier then Stefan Klos, he made just 18 appearances for the Glasgow club (two in the UEFA Champions League against Dutch side Ajax) before he was released in 1999. He didn't make any appearances for Rangers after December 1997. He played two seasons at MVV before he retired from playing and became a goalkeeping coach in his native Netherlands with Twente.

== International career ==
Snelders was a member of the Dutch squad at the 1983 FIFA World Youth Championship. He made his only full international appearance on 22 March 1989, against the Soviet Union. He kept a clean sheet as the Dutch won 2–0, with the goals coming from a Marco van Basten diving header and a Ronald Koeman penalty. Snelders was an unused substitute with the Dutch team at the 1994 World Cup.

== Career statistics ==
=== Club ===
Appearances and goals by club, season and competition
| Club | Season | League | | | National Cup | | League Cup | | Europe | | Total | |
| Club | Season | Division | Apps | Goals | Apps | Goals | Apps | Goals | Apps | Goals | Apps | Goals |
|---|---|---|---|---|---|---|---|---|---|---|---|---|
| Twente | 1980–81 | Eredivisie | 4 | 0 | – | – | – | – | – | – | 4+ | 0+ |
| Twente | 1981–82 | Eredivisie | 15 | 0 | – | – | – | – | – | – | 15+ | 0+ |
| Twente | 1982–83 | Eredivisie | 17 | 0 | – | – | – | – | – | – | 17+ | 0+ |
| Twente | 1983–84 | Eerste Divisie | 32 | 0 | – | – | – | – | – | – | 32+ | 0+ |
| Twente | 1984–85 | Eredivisie | 34 | 0 | – | – | – | – | – | – | 34+ | 0+ |
| Twente | 1985–86 | Eredivisie | 35 | 0 | – | – | – | – | – | – | 35+ | 0+ |
| Twente | 1986–87 | Eredivisie | 34 | 0 | – | – | – | – | – | – | 34+ | 0+ |
| Twente | 1987–88 | Eredivisie | 28 | 0 | – | – | – | – | – | – | 28+ | 0+ |
| Twente | Total | | 199 | 0 | - | - | - | - | - | - | 199+ | 0+ |
| Aberdeen | 1988–89 | Scottish Premier Division | 36 | 0 | 5 | 0 | 5 | 0 | 2 | 0 | 48 | 0 |
| Aberdeen | 1989–90 | Scottish Premier Division | 23 | 0 | 2 | 0 | 5 | 0 | 2 | 0 | 32 | 0 |
| Aberdeen | 1990–91 | Scottish Premier Division | 20 | 0 | 1 | 0 | 4 | 0 | 2 | 0 | 27 | 0 |
| Aberdeen | 1991–92 | Scottish Premier Division | 42 | 0 | 1 | 0 | 2 | 0 | 2 | 0 | 47 | 0 |
| Aberdeen | 1992–93 | Scottish Premier Division | 41 | 0 | 6 | 0 | 5 | 0 | 0 | 0 | 52 | 0 |
| Aberdeen | 1993–94 | Scottish Premier Division | 33 | 0 | 3 | 0 | 3 | 0 | 4 | 0 | 43 | 0 |
| Aberdeen | 1994–95 | Scottish Premier Division | 26 | 0 | 2 | 0 | 3 | 0 | 2 | 0 | 33 | 0 |
| Aberdeen | 1995–96 | Scottish Premier Division | 7 | 0 | 0 | 0 | 2 | 0 | 0 | 0 | 9 | 0 |
| Aberdeen | Total | | 228 | 0 | 20 | 0 | 29 | 0 | 14 | 0 | 291 | 0 |
| Rangers | 1995–96 | Scottish Premier Division | 2 | 0 | 0 | 0 | 0 | 0 | 0 | 0 | 2 | 0 |
| Rangers | 1996–97 | Scottish Premier Division | 4 | 0 | 0 | 0 | 1 | 0 | 2 | 0 | 7 | 0 |
| Rangers | 1997–98 | Scottish Premier Division | 7 | 0 | 0 | 0 | 1 | 0 | 1 | 0 | 9 | 0 |
| Rangers | 1998–99 | SPL | 0 | 0 | 0 | 0 | 0 | 0 | 0 | 0 | 0 | 0 |
| Rangers | Total | | 13 | 0 | 0 | 0 | 2 | 0 | 3 | 0 | 18 | 0 |
| MVV | 1999-00 | Eredivisie | 27 | 0 | – | – | – | – | – | – | 27+ | 0+ |
| MVV | 2000–01 | Eerste Divisie | 11 | 0 | – | – | – | – | – | – | 11+ | 0+ |
| MVV | Total | | 38 | 0 | - | - | - | - | - | - | 38+ | 0+ |
| Career total | | | 478 | 0 | 20+ | 0+ | 31+ | 0+ | 17+ | 0+ | 546+ | 0+ |

=== International ===
Appearances and goals by national team and year
| National team | Year | Apps | Goals |
|---|---|---|---|
| Netherlands | 1989 | 1 | 0 |
| Total | | 1 | 0 |

== Honours ==
Aberdeen

- Scottish Premier Division: Runners-up 1988–89, 1989–90, 1990–91, 1992–93, 1993–94
- Scottish Cup: 1989–90; runners-up 1992–93
- Scottish League Cup: 1989–90; runners-up 1988–89

Rangers

- Scottish League Cup: 1996–97
