= Paul Mason (footballer) =

English footballer (born 1963)

Personal information
- Full name: Paul David Mason
- Date of birth: 3 September 1963 (age 63)
- Place of birth: Kensington, Liverpool, England
- Height: 5 ft 9 in (1.75 m)
- Position: Midfielder

Youth career
- 1975–1980: Liverpool

Senior career*
| Years | Team | Apps | (Gls) |
| 1984–1988 | FC Groningen | 103 | (7) |
| 1988–1993 | Aberdeen | 158 | (27) |
| 1993–1998 | Ipswich Town | 112 | (36) |
| Total | | 373 | (70) |
- * Club domestic league appearances and goals

Paul David Mason (born 3 September 1963) is an English former professional footballer who played as a midfielder from 1984 until 2000.

He played in the Premier League and Football League for Ipswich Town, the Scottish Premier League for Aberdeen and in the Netherlands for Groningen.

== Playing career ==
Mason played for Liverpool Schoolboys from the under 12s through to the under 16s. At the age of 16, he joined his lifelong heroes, Everton FC, as a youth player. Mason played for Everton for approximately 12 months before the club let him go, citing Mason's small physique at the time, as the reason for their decision.

After leaving Everton, Mason played for another Merseyside club, Tranmere Rovers, for 12 months, where he played in both the youth and reserve teams. Tranmere didn't offer him a contract, which forced Mason to leave the Club in order to find full-time, paid employment away from football.

Mason continued to play football though, and after securing a full-time job as a labourer, he began to play for another local amateur team, Port Sunlight. Aged 18, he broke his leg in a cup semi-final while playing for Cheshire in Tiverton.

After 6 weeks in a plaster cast and 6 months out of football, convinced that a career as a Professional footballer was now over, Mason made the decision to follow his eldest brother to the Netherlands where labouring jobs seemed plentiful at the time.

Based in Delfzijl, in Groningen, Mason soon found work and began to play for local amateur football teams again. It wasn't long before scouts from FC Groningen, one of the biggest football clubs in the area, spotted Mason. Mason's progress was watched closely by the scouts for several months. He was finally invited for trials at the club and was offered a 12-month reserve contract as a result. A year later, FC Groningen, impressed with his performance, offered Mason, a 3-year full-time, professional contract.

Mason went on to become an established first team member at FC Groningen. During his time in the Netherlands, Mason was voted in Marco van Basten's dream team for up and coming stars and he attracted the attention of much bigger teams such as Ajax and Feyenoord. Though happy in the Netherlands, coming from a large close knit family, Mason always wanted to get back to the UK and closer to home. When Alex Smith offered him the chance to move to Aberdeen in 1988 for £400,000, Mason and his young family returned to the UK and he joined Aberdeen FC at the same time as Theo Snelders who had arrived at the club from FC Twente as a replacement for Jim Leighton.

Mason was held in very high regard in Scottish football and was asked to play for the Scotland national team during his time at the Club but felt he had to decline the offer as he was born in England and any Scottish family connection would have been extremely tenuous. Whilst at Aberdeen FC, Mason attracted the attention of Rangers. He chose to remain at Aberdeen and went on to score the 2 goals that won Aberdeen the 1989 Scottish League Cup Final against Rangers in the 1989–1990 season. He also played for them in the victorious 1990 Scottish Cup Final.

After a very successful 5 years at Aberdeen, Mason moved to Ipswich Town in 1993. Again, he became a popular member of the team and was very popular with the fans. He made 112 appearances for Ipswich Town, scoring 36 goals.

Mason retired from football in 1999, aged 35.

== Career statistics ==
=== Club ===
Appearances and goals by club, season and competition
| Club | Season | League | | | Scottish Cup | | League Cup | | Europe | | Total | |
| Club | Season | Division | Apps | Goals | Apps | Goals | Apps | Goals | Apps | Goals | Apps | Goals |
|---|---|---|---|---|---|---|---|---|---|---|---|---|
| Aberdeen | 1988-89 | Scottish Premier Division | 28 | 4 | 1 | 0 | 2 | 0 | 2 | 0 | 33 | 4 |
| Aberdeen | 1989–90 | Scottish Premier Division | 34 | 9 | 5 | 1 | 5 | 5 | 2 | 0 | 46 | 15 |
| Aberdeen | 1990–91 | Scottish Premier Division | 26 | 3 | 1 | 0 | 4 | 3 | 4 | 1 | 35 | 7 |
| Aberdeen | 1991–92 | Scottish Premier Division | 31 | 7 | 1 | 0 | 0 | 0 | 0 | 0 | 32 | 7 |
| Aberdeen | 1992–93 | Scottish Premier Division | 39 | 4 | 4 | 0 | 4 | 0 | 0 | 0 | 47 | 4 |
| Aberdeen | Total | | 158 | 27 | 12 | 1 | 15 | 8 | 8 | 1 | 193 | 37 |

== Personal life ==
Mason now lives in the seaside resort of Southport where he owns a guest house. Mason continues to take an interest in football and other sports and his Guest House has proved popular with golfers taking part in local tournaments and celebrities appearing at the local Theatres.
