= Willem van der Ark =

Dutch footballer (born 1963)

Personal information
- Full name: Willem van der Ark
- Date of birth: 13 November 1963 (age 62)
- Place of birth: Groningen, Netherlands
- Height: 1.96 m (6 ft 5 in)
- Position: Forward

Youth career
- 1970–1984: GVAV Rapiditas

Senior career*
Years	Team	Apps	(Gls)
1984–1987	Cambuur	119	(47)
1988	Willem II	14	(7)
1989–1991	Aberdeen	64	(13)
1991–1992	FC Utrecht	26	(5)
1993	FC Den Haag	10	(4)
1993–1994	FC Utrecht	31	(6)
1994–1996	Cambuur	6	(5)
Total		270	(87)
- * Club domestic league appearances and goals

Willem van der Ark (Dutch pronunciation: [ˈʋɪləɱ vɑn dər ˈɑr(ə)k]; born 13 November 1963 in Groningen) is a Dutch retired football striker, who played for Aberdeen in the late 1980s and early 1990s.

He was one of a series of Dutch players signed for the Scottish side during this time and Van der Ark was bought as a striker and noted for his height (6 foot, 5 inches).

== Club career ==
Van der Ark came through the GVAV Rapiditas youth system and joined Cambuur in 1984. He proved to be an immedatie success alongside fellow striker Bram Rontberg and was sold to Willem II for 250,000 guilders in 1988. He then moved abroad to Scottish side Aberdeen after only half a season in Tilburg.

During his time at Aberdeen he made 77 appearances (38 of them as substitute), scoring 17 goals and securing 2 winners medals – the 1989/90 Skol Cup and 1989/90 Scottish Cup. He played alongside compatriots Theo Snelders, Hans Gillhaus and Peter van de Ven at the club.

He later played for FC Utrecht and FC Den Haag. He left Utrecht to return to Cambuur in summer 1994.

== Retirement ==
Van der Ark now works as a real estate agent in Leeuwarden.

== Career statistics ==
Club	Seasons	League			Scottish Cup		League Cup		Europe		Total	
Club	Seasons	Division	Apps	Goals	Apps	Goals	Apps	Goals	Apps	Goals	Apps	Goals
Aberdeen	1988-89	Scottish Premier Division	8	2	1	0	0	0	0	0	9	2
Aberdeen	1989-90	Scottish Premier Division	27	7	3	3	3	1	2	0	35	11
Aberdeen	1990-91	Scottish Premier Division	11	4	0	0	0	0	0	0	11	4
Aberdeen	1991-92	Scottish Premier Division	18	0	0	0	2	0	2	0	22	0
Aberdeen	Total		64	13	4	3	5	1	4	0	77	17
