= Brian Grant (footballer) =

Scottish footballer & coach (born 1964)

Personal information
- Full name: Brian Grant
- Date of birth: 19 June 1964 (age 62)
- Place of birth: Bannockburn, Scotland
- Position: Midfielder

Team information
- Current team: Dundee United (head of player pathway and loans)

Youth career
- Fallin Violet

Senior career*
Years	Team	Apps	(Gls)
1981–1984	Stirling Albion	26	(3)
1984–1996	Aberdeen	265	(27)
1996–1998	Hibernian	17	(0)
1998–1999	Dundee	12	(0)
1999	→ Stirling Albion (loan)	7	(1)
Total		327	(31)
- * Club domestic league appearances and goals

Brian Grant (born 19 June 1964) is a Scottish football coach and former professional footballer who is who played as a midfielder. He is currently head of player pathway and loans at Scottish Premiership club Dundee United. He spent twelve years as a player with Aberdeen, making over 300 appearances and winning three major trophies. He also played for Stirling Albion, Hibernian and Dundee.

== Playing career ==
Grant began his career in the early 1980s with local Stirling Albion, recovering from a double leg fracture before joining Alex Ferguson's Aberdeen in 1984. He took some time to become a regular in the side ahead of older players who had won several domestic and European trophies, but became established towards the end of the decade, winning both the Scottish League Cup and the Scottish Cup in the 1989–90 season, as well as playing a part in several other finals and runners-up finishes in the Scottish Premier Division (losing out to Rangers on every occasion). He later lifted the League Cup again in 1995, a few months after helping the club avoid what would have been a first-ever relegation via a play-off. In August 1996, Aberdeen played Everton in a testimonial for Grant, with the 9,000-plus crowd witnessing a 3–1 win for the Merseyside team.

Midway through the 1996-97 season, Grant joined Hibernian for a £75,000 fee, spending little over a year at Easter Road before a March 1998 move to Dundee. Towards the end of the 1998-99 season, returned to first club Stirling on loan, scoring in what turned out to be his final match at senior level. Grant moved on to Bellshill Athletic at the end of the season and chose not to remain in football after retiring.

== Later work ==
After retiring as a player, Grant managed a McDonald's franchise in Forfar. He also remained involved in football, coaching Dundee United youth teams. In February 2019, with the appointment of Andy Goldie as the club's new academy director, Grant moved to a new role as head of player pathway and loans.

== Personal life ==
Grant is the father of former Falkirk player Thomas Grant.

== Career statistics ==
=== Club ===
Appearances and goals by club, season and competition

Club	Season	League			Scottish Cup		League Cup		Europe		Other		Total	
Club	Season	Division	Apps	Goals	Apps	Goals	Apps	Goals	Apps	Goals	Apps	Goals	Apps	Goals
Stirling Albion	1983-84	Scottish Second Division	26	3	0	0	0	0	-	-	-	-	26	3
Stirling Albion	Total		26	3	0	0	0	0	-	-	-	-	26	3
Aberdeen	1984-85	Scottish Premier Division	0	0	0	0	1	0	0	0	-	-	1	0
Aberdeen	1985-86	Scottish Premier Division	0	0	0	0	0	0	0	0	-	-	0	0
Aberdeen	1986-87	Scottish Premier Division	15	4	3	0	0	0	0	0	-	-	18	4
Aberdeen	1987-88	Scottish Premier Division	7	1	1	0	2	0	1	0	-	-	11	1
Aberdeen	1988-89	Scottish Premier Division	27	1	3	1	2	1	1	0	-	-	33	3
Aberdeen	1989-90	Scottish Premier Division	31	6	5	1	5	0	2	1	-	-	43	8
Aberdeen	1990-91	Scottish Premier Division	32	2	0	0	4	0	3	0	-	-	39	2
Aberdeen	1991-92	Scottish Premier Division	33	6	1	0	2	1	2	0	-	-	38	7
Aberdeen	1992-93	Scottish Premier Division	29	3	5	0	2	0	0	0	-	-	36	3
Aberdeen	1993-94	Scottish Premier Division	30	2	4	0	0	0	2	0	-	-	36	2
Aberdeen	1994-95	Scottish Premier Division	34	2	1	0	4	0	1	0	-	-	40	2
Aberdeen	1995-96	Scottish Premier Division	25	0	4	0	2	0	0	0	-	-	31	0
Aberdeen	1996-97	Scottish Premier Division	2	0	0	0	1	0	3	0	-	-	6	0
Aberdeen	Total		265	27	27	2	25	2	15	1	-	-	332	32
Hibernian	1996-97	Scottish Premier Division	12	0	4	0	0	0	0	0	1	0	17	0
Hibernian	1997-98	Scottish First Division	5	0	0	0	2	0	0	0	-	-	7	0
Hibernian	Total		17	0	4	0	2	0	0	0	1	0	24	0
Dundee	1997-98	Scottish First Division	8	0	0	0	0	0	-	-	-	-	8	0
Dundee	1998-99	SPL	4	0	1	0	0	0	0	0	-	-	5	0
Dundee	Total		12	0	1	0	0	0	0	0	-	-	13	0
Stirling Albion (loan)	1998-99	Scottish Second Division	7	1	0	0	0	0	-	-	-	-	7	1
Career total			327	31	32	2	27	2	15	1	1	0	402	36

== Honours ==
Aberdeen

- Scottish Premier Division: Runners-up 1988–89, 1989–90, 1990–91, 1992–93, 1993–94
- Scottish Cup: 1989–90
  - Runners-up 1992–93
- Scottish League Cup: 1989–90, 1995–96
  - Runners-up 1987–88, 1992–93
