= Ian Cameron (footballer, born 1966) =

Scottish footballer

Personal information
- Date of birth: 24 August 1966 (age 60)
- Place of birth: Glasgow, Scotland
- Position: Midfielder

Senior career*
| Years | Team | Apps | (Gls) |
| 1986–1989 | St Mirren | 127 | (17) |
| 1989–1992 | Aberdeen | 27 | (1) |
| 1992–1996 | Partick Thistle | 151 | (10) |
| 1996–1997 | Hibernian | 18 | (0) |
| 1997–1999 | Raith Rovers | 37 | (5) |
| 1998 | → Clyde (loan) | 12 | (1) |
| 1999–2000 | Clydebank | 32 | (5) |
| 2000–2001 | Partick Thistle | 13 | (0) |
| 2001–2002 | Airdrieonians | 9 | (0) |
| Total | | 426 | (39) |
- * Club domestic league appearances and goals

Ian Cameron (born 24 August 1966) is a Scottish former professional footballer who played as a midfielder. He is a first team coach at Partick Thistle and manages the Under-19s, having previously coached their Under-17 team.

== Playing career ==
=== St Mirren ===
Cameron was born in Glasgow. He joined St Mirren as an S-Form signing. In 1987, at the age of 21, he was part of the team who won the Scottish Cup after beating Dundee United in the Final. He had sat his economics exams at Glasgow University on the morning of the match.

=== Aberdeen ===
Cameron signed for Aberdeen in the summer of 1989 and made his debut against Albion Rovers in a 1989–90 Scottish League Cup tie. Cameron scored the winner against Celtic at Hampden Park in the semi-final of the same tournament, but missed out on playing in the final after suffering concussion in a league game against Hearts, although he did pick up a winner's medal. First team opportunities were limited for him at Aberdeen, and he left in 1992.

=== Partick Thistle ===
Manager John Lambie signed Cameron for Partick Thistle on the eve of the 1992–93 season, the club's first campaign back in the Premier Division; he missed just two games, scoring five times from midfield, as Thistle defied predictions to remain in the top tier. At the start of the next campaign he scored four times in a League Cup tie as a record defeat (11–1) was inflicted upon Albion Rovers. He was also part of the sides that stayed up in each of the following two seasons before a dramatic play-off defeat to Dundee United at Tannadice in May 1996 that meant relegation for Thistle. With just 40 seconds remaining it looked as if Cameron's second half penalty would keep his team in the Premier Division for another season, but fate decreed otherwise. He joined Hibernian that summer, but again found playing opportunities limited in his single year at Easter Road.

=== Later career ===
Cameron later played for Raith Rovers, Clyde, Clydebank and Airdrieonians as well as a brief return to Partick Thistle, before retiring in 2001 aged 35.

== Coaching career ==
Cameron coached Rangers Under-17 before moving to Partick Thistle to take over their Under-17s. He then stepped up to the Thistle Under-19s, winning the SFL League Cup, and then moving into a first team coach position under Ian McCall. He combines an accountancy career with his coaching work.

== Personal life ==
Cameron has two children, a son named Ian, who had a short spell as a player with Partick Thistle, and is a coach in the United States and a daughter named Kayleigh (Grieve) who was a footballer with Celtic Ladies, Glasgow City and Partick Thistle.
