= David Robertson (footballer, born 1968) =

Scottish footballer and coach

Personal information
- Full name: David Alexander Robertson
- Date of birth: 17 October 1968 (age 58)
- Place of birth: Aberdeen, Scotland
- Position: Left back

Youth career
- Deeside BC
- 1984–1986: Aberdeen

Senior career*
Years	Team	Apps	(Gls)
1986–1991	Aberdeen	134	(2)
1991–1997	Rangers	183	(15)
1997–2001	Leeds United	26	(0)
2002	Montrose	7	(0)
Total		350	(17)

International career
1987–1994	Scotland B	2	(0)
1988–1989	Scotland U21	6	(0)
1990	Scottish League XI	1	(0)
1992–1994	Scotland	3	(0)

Managerial career
- 2003–2005: Elgin City
- 2006–2007: Montrose
- 2012–2013: Phoenix FC
- 2017–2022: Real Kashmir
- 2022–2023: Peterhead
- * Club domestic league appearances and goals

David Alexander Robertson BEM (born 17 October 1968) is a Scottish former football player and coach, who was most recently the manager of Scottish League One club Peterhead.

Robertson played as a left back for Aberdeen, Rangers, Leeds United, Montrose and represented Scotland. Since retiring as a player, he has managed Elgin City, Montrose, Phoenix FC and most recently I-League club Real Kashmir, before being appointed manager of Peterhead in November 2022.

== Playing career ==
Robertson began playing football with Deeside Boys Club (now Banks O' Dee FC) before he started his football career by signing an "s" form with local club Aberdeen, where he won the Scottish Youth Cup alongside Joe Miller, Paul Wright and Stevie Gray. After becoming a first team regular aged 17, he won a Scottish League Cup winner's medal against Rangers in 1989 and a Scottish Cup winner's medal in 1990 against Celtic in a match which ended with a thrilling penalty shoot out (9–8, Robertson scoring his kick).

Robertson moved to Rangers for £970,000 in 1991. With the Ibrox club, he helped the club to the last six of their joint-record nine championship titles in a row, as well as adding three more Scottish Cups and three more League Cups to his collection. He only received one red card during his spell, for a brutal bodycheck on his friend Joe Miller in the opening minutes of the Old Firm 1992 Scottish Cup semi-final, which broke the Celtic winger's ribs (Miller played on, Rangers still won the match with ten men and Robertson appeared in the final after suspension). During his time at the Gers, he won three full international caps for Scotland.

After exactly 250 games for Rangers, Robertson signed for Leeds United in 1997 for £500,000, but recurring injury problems curtailed his spell in England and he played only 26 league matches in four years at Elland Road (all in the first season).

Robertson retired from football in 2001 but was back playing in 2002 when he was appointed player/assistant manager of Scottish Football League club Montrose. He scored his first and only goal for Montrose in a 3–2 defeat at Cowdenbeath in the Scottish League Cup. His playing career with Montrose was cut short, however, due to one of his Achilles tendons snapping during a match against Greenock Morton in the same year.

== Coaching career ==
In September 2006, Robertson was appointed manager of Montrose but he resigned just four months later. He moved to Phoenix, Arizona and worked as a director of boy's coaching at the Sereno Soccer Club. Robertson was head coach of USL Pro club Phoenix FC in 2013.

=== Real Kashmir ===
In January 2017 Robertson was appointed as the head coach of Indian I-League 2nd Division side Real Kashmir. Under his tenure Real Kashmir won the promotion to Indian top flight football, thus becoming the first team from Kashmir to be promoted to the I-League. Robertson also signed his son Mason to play for the club.

Robertson's management of Real Kashmir was featured in two documentaries made for BBC Scotland, Real Kashmir FC and Return to Real Kashmir FC, which won best documentary at Scottish BAFTAs, the UK Broadcast awards, and the European Sports Awards in Rotterdam. He was awarded the British Empire Medal (BEM) in the 2021 Birthday Honours for services to the community in Kashmir and UK-India relations. He left the club in September 2022, and was succeeded by Mehrajuddin Wadoo.

=== Peterhead ===
On 29 November 2022, Robertson was named as the new manager of Scottish League One club Peterhead, marking his first managerial role in Scotland in 15 years. He left the position in March 2023, following a run of results that the Peterhead chairman described as "embarrassing".

== Personal life ==
His son Mason is also a footballer.

== Career statistics ==
=== Club ===
Appearances and goals by club, season and competition
Club	Seasons	League			National Cup		League Cup		Europe		Other		Total	
Club	Seasons	Division	Apps	Goals	Apps	Goals	Apps	Goals	Apps	Goals	Apps	Goals	Apps	Goals
Aberdeen	1985–86	Scottish Premier Division	0	0	0	0	0	0	0	0	-	-	0	0
Aberdeen	1986–87	Scottish Premier Division	34	0	3	0	3	0	2	0	-	-	42	0
Aberdeen	1987–88	Scottish Premier Division	23	0	4	0	4	0	2	0	-	-	33	0
Aberdeen	1988–89	Scottish Premier Division	23	0	0	0	5	0	2	0	-	-	30	0
Aberdeen	1989–90	Scottish Premier Division	19	1	2	0	5	1	1	0	-	-	27	2
Aberdeen	1990–91	Scottish Premier Division	35	1	1	0	4	0	4	0	-	-	44	1
Aberdeen	Total		134	2	10	0	21	1	11	0	-	-	176	3
Rangers	1991–92	Scottish Premier Division	42	1	5	0	4	1	2	0	-	-	53	2
Rangers	1992–93	Scottish Premier Division	39	3	5	0	5	0	9	0	-	-	58	3
Rangers	1993–94	Scottish Premier Division	32	1	6	1	4	0	1	0	-	-	43	2
Rangers	1994–95	Scottish Premier Division	23	3	2	0	1	0	2	0	-	-	28	3
Rangers	1995–96	Scottish Premier Division	25	3	5	1	3	0	5	0	-	-	38	4
Rangers	1996–97	Scottish Premier Division	22	4	3	1	2	0	3	0	-	-	30	5
Rangers	Total		183	15	26	3	19	1	22	0	-	-	250	19
Leeds United	1997–98	Premier League	26	0	1	0	4	0	0	0	-	-	31	0
Leeds United	1998–99	Premier League	0	0	0	0	0	0	0	0	-	-	0	0
Leeds United	1999–00	Premier League	0	0	0	0	0	0	0	0	-	-	0	0
Leeds United	2000–01	Premier League	0	0	0	0	0	0	0	0	-	-	0	0
Leeds United	2001–02	Premier League	0	0	0	0	0	0	0	0	-	-	0	0
Leeds United	Total		26	0	1	0	4	0	0	0	-	-	31	0
Montrose	2002–03	Scottish Third Division	7	0	0	0	1	1	-	-	2	0	10	1
Career total			350	17	37	3	45	3	33	0	2	0	467	23

=== International appearances ===
Scotland national team
Year	Apps	Goals
1992	1	0
1993	1	0
1994	1	0
Total	3	0

=== Managerial record ===
As of match played 18 March 2023

Team	From	To	Record				
Team	From	To	P	W	L	D	Win %
Elgin City	30 November 2003	2 December 2005	103	21	61	21	20.39%
Montrose	4 September 2006	17 January 2007	25	7	16	2	28.00%
Phoenix FC	15 July 2012	16 August 2013	27	5	15	7	18.52%
Real Kashmir	2 January 2017	31 August 2022	70	34	16	20	48.57%
Peterhead	29 November 2022	21 March 2023	12	1	9	2	8.33%
Total			237	68	117	52	28.69%

== Honours ==
=== Player ===
Aberdeen

- Scottish Cup: 1989–90
- Scottish League Cup: 1989–90

Rangers

- Scottish Premier Division: 1991–92, 1992–93, 1993–94, 1994–95, 1995–96, 1996–97
- Scottish Cup: 1991–92, 1992–93, 1995–96
- Scottish League Cup: 1992–93, 1993–94, 1996–97

=== Manager ===
Elgin City

- North of Scotland Cup: 2003–04

Real Kashmir

- I-League 2nd Division: 2017–18
- IFA Shield: 2020, 2021
