= Alex Smith (footballer, born 1939) =

Scottish footballer and manager

Alex Smith MBE
Personal information
- Date of birth: 25 December 1939 (age 86)
- Place of birth: Cowie, Scotland
- Position: Inside forward

Youth career
- Gowanhill United

Senior career*
Years	Team	Apps	(Gls)
1958–1959	Kilmarnock	0	(0)
1959–1962	Stenhousemuir	39	(9)
1962–1965	Stirling Albion	51	(11)
1965–1966	East Stirlingshire	12	(4)
1966–1968	Albion Rovers	23	(0)
1968–1970	Stenhousemuir	23	(0)
Total		148	(24)

Managerial career
- 1968–1974: Stenhousemuir
- 1974–1986: Stirling Albion
- Scotland U18
- 1986–1988: St Mirren
- 1988–1992: Aberdeen
- 1992–1996: Clyde
- 1998–2002: Scotland U21
- 2000–2002: Dundee United
- 2002–2005: Ross County
- 2013: Falkirk (interim)
- 2017: Falkirk (interim)
- * Club domestic league appearances and goals

Alex Smith MBE (born 25 December 1939) is a Scottish former football player and manager. His major achievements over close to five decades as a manager include winning the Scottish Cup in 1987 with St Mirren and 1990 with Aberdeen, where he also won the Scottish League Cup in 1989. He also won league titles with Stirling Albion and Clyde.

He managed the Scotland under-18, under-21 and under-23 teams.

He had a role in the development of many prominent players, and the 2005 book on Scottish football, The Final Whistle? was described as "the nearest thing the Scottish game has to a father figure".

== Biography ==
Smith was born in Cowie, a mining village close to Stirling, and played in the same youth team as Billy Bremner - Gowanhill United. He was best man at Bremner's wedding in 1961. His playing career was affected by serious injuries, but he played for Kilmarnock, Stenhousemuir, East Stirlingshire, Stirling Albion and Albion Rovers over a ten-year period.

He took on the role of player coach at Stenhousemuir in 1968, becoming the club's first-ever manager in November 1969. In 1974, he became manager of Stirling Albion and would manage the club for 12 years, winning the Second Division championship in 1977.

During this time he developed key young players such as John Colqhoun, Bryan Grant, John Phillibin and Willie Irvine who all went on to play for Scottish Premiership clubs.

At this time, he also managed to put the club into a strong and stable financial position.

Stirling Albion remained in the second tier for four seasons, and were relegated in 1981 after failing to score a league goal for three months; Smith nonetheless remained at the club until 1986 when he moved to St Mirren, with whom he won the Scottish Cup in 1987, overcoming that season's UEFA Cup finalists Dundee United with a young, all-Scottish team in a surprise result which endured as one of the Paisley club's most treasured achievements.

Smith and co-manager Jocky Scott succeeded Ian Porterfield at Aberdeen in 1988. For the next three seasons the Dons were the main rivals to Rangers, finishing runners-up in each of those seasons. New players were brought in, several from Dutch football including Theo Snelders and Hans Gillhaus, along with youth prospects such as Eoin Jess and Stephen Wright. In 1989–90 Aberdeen won the double of the League Cup (beating Rangers after losing to them the previous year) and Scottish Cup (in a penalty shootout against Celtic), and in 1990–91 went into their final game at Ibrox needing only a draw to win the Scottish Premier Division championship on goals scored; a 2–0 defeat courtesy of a Mark Hateley brace sealed a third straight title for Rangers. Aberdeen began the next season well, including a win at Ibrox, but early exits from the League Cup and UEFA Cup followed; Scott left in September 1991 to take over at Dunfermline Athletic, and a further slump in form resulted in Smith's dismissal in February 1992.

Smith would later manage Clyde, Dundee United and Ross County. He later worked as technical director at Falkirk. In June 2009 he was appointed assistant to the then head coach Eddie May. In March 2013 he was appointed interim manager at the club following the departure of Steven Pressley. He was again placed in interim charge in September 2017, after Peter Houston left. Smith was 77 years old, which made him the oldest manager of a professional football club in Europe at the time.

Smith was involved with Scotland at a number of levels, managing the U18 and U21 sides. He also took charge of the Scotland B squad in January 2007, alongside Bobby Williamson.

He retired from football at the end of the 2017–18 season to emigrate to Australia with his wife.

Smith was appointed Member of the Order of the British Empire (MBE) in the 2005 Birthday Honours for services to sport in Scotland.

== Managerial statistics ==
Team	From	To	Record				
Team	From	To	P	W	L	D	Win %
Stenhousemuir	1 August 1968	1 September 1974	218	68	42	108	31.19
Stirling	1 September 1974	16 December 1986	552	203	155	194	36.78
St Mirren	17 December 1986	31 May 1988	72	20	20	32	27.78
Aberdeen	1 August 1988	10 February 1992	178	91	39	48	51.12
Clyde	1 August 1992	September 1996	186	65	49	72	34.95
Scotland U21	October 1998	14 March 2002	23	8	5	10	34.78
Dundee United	8 August 2000	7 October 2002	99	31	45	23	31.31
Ross County	27 November 2002	11 June 2005	112	39	45	28	34.82
Falkirk (interim)	8 March 2013	3 April 2013	5	3	2	0	60.00
Falkirk (interim)	24 September 2017	7 October 2017	2	2	0	0	100.00
Total			1,447	530	402	515	36.63

== Honours ==
=== Player ===
Stirling Albion

- Scottish Division Two: 1964–65

=== Manager ===
Stenhousemuir

- Stirlingshire Cup: 1970–71

Stirling Albion

- Scottish Second Division: 1976–77
- Stirlingshire Cup: 1976–77, 1977–78, 1983–84

St Mirren

- Scottish Cup: 1986–87

Aberdeen (co-manager with Jocky Scott)

- Scottish Cup: 1989–90
- Scottish League Cup: 1989–90
  - Runners-up: 1988–89
- Aberdeenshire Cup: 1989–90,1990–91

Clyde

- Scottish Second Division: 1992–93

Springfield United

- Australia - FQPL5 Metro Premiership: 2022
- Australia - FQPL5 Metro Grand Final: 2022
- Australia - SUFC Cup: 2021, 2022

Individual

- SPL Manager of the Month: March 2001, May 2001, January 2002

== See also ==
- List of football managers with the most matches
