= 1989–90 Scottish Cup =

Tournament details
- Country: Scotland

Final positions
- Champions: Aberdeen
- Runners-up: Celtic

The 1989–90 Scottish Cup was the 105th staging of Scotland's most prestigious football knockout competition. The Cup was won by Aberdeen who defeated Celtic in the final. It was the first final to have been decided by a penalty shootout.

== First round ==
Home team	Score	Away team
Berwick Rangers(3)	1 – 1	Stenhousemuir (3)
Brechin City(3)	3 – 1	Montrose(3)
Elgin City(HL)	2 – 1	Arbroath(3)
Queen of the South(3)	2 – 1	Cove Rangers(HL)
Queen's Park (3)	1 – 2	Dumbarton(3)
Stirling Albion (3)	4 – 0	Coldstream (ESL)

=== Replay ===
Home team	Score	Away team
Stenhousemuir (3)	1 – 0	Berwick Rangers (3)

== Second round ==
Home team	Score	Away team
Ross County (HL)	1 – 4	East Fife (3)
Dumbarton (3)	0 – 2	Cowdenbeath (3)
Elgin City (HL)	2 – 2	Brechin City (3)
Gala Fairydean (ESL)	2 – 2	Inverness Caledonian (HL)
Stenhousemuir (3)	0 – 1	Queen of the South (3)
Stirling Albion (3)	3 – 0	Whitehill Welfare (ESL)
Stranraer (3)	1 – 1	Kilmarnock (3)
Vale of Leithen (ESL)	1 – 3	East Stirlingshire (3)

=== Replays ===
Home team	Score	Away team
Brechin City (3)	8 – 0	Elgin City (HL)
Inverness Caledonian (HL)	4 – 1	Gala Fairydean (ESL)
Kilmarnock (3)	0 – 0 (2 – 4 pen.)	Stranraer (3)

== Third round ==
Home team	Score	Away team
East Stirlingshire (3)	0 – 1	Stirling Albion (3)
Airdrieonians (2)	2 – 2	Inverness Caledonian (HL)
Albion Rovers (2)	0 – 2	Clydebank (2)
Ayr United (2)	0 – 0	St Mirren (1)
Brechin City (3)	0 – 2	Hibernian (1)
Cowdenbeath (3)	3 – 1	Stranraer (3)
Dundee(1)	0 – 0	Dundee United (1)
Dunfermline Athletic (1)	0 – 0	Hamilton Academical (2)
East Fife (3)	3 – 1	Meadowbank Thistle (2)
Forfar Athletic (2)	1 – 2	Celtic (1)
Hearts (1)	2 – 0	Falkirk(2)
Greenock Morton (2)	2 – 2	Raith Rovers (2)
Motherwell (1)	7 – 0	Clyde (2)
Partick Thistle (2)	2 – 6	Aberdeen (1)
Queen of the South (3)	0 – 0	Alloa Athletic (2)
Rangers (1)	3 – 0	St Johnstone (2)

=== Replays ===
Home team	Score	Away team
Hamilton Academical (2)	0 – 1	Dunfermline Athletic (1)
Alloa Athletic (2)	2 – 3	Queen of the South (3)
Raith Rovers (2)	1 – 3	Greenock Morton (2)
Inverness Caledonian (HL)	1 – 1 (5 – 4 pen.)	Airdrieonians (2)
St Mirren (1)	2 – 1	Ayr United (2)
Dundee United (1)	1 – 0	Dundee (1)

== Fourth round ==
Home team	Score	Away team
St Mirren (1)	1 – 1	Clydebank (2)
Stirling Albion (3)	6 – 2	Inverness Caledonian (HL)
Cowdenbeath (3)	1 – 2	Dunfermline Athletic (1)
Dundee United (1)	2 – 1	Queen of the South (3)
Celtic (1)	1 – 0	Rangers (1)
Aberdeen (1)	2 – 1	Greenock Morton (2)
Hearts (1)	4 – 0	Motherwell (2)
Hibernian (1)	5 – 1	East Fife (3)

=== Replays ===
Home team	Score	Away team
Clydebank (2)	3 – 2	St Mirren(1)

== Quarter-finals ==
Home team	Score	Away team
Aberdeen (1)	4 – 1	Hearts (1)
Clydebank (2)	1 – 1	Stirling Albion (3)
Dundee United (1)	1 – 0	Hibernian (1)
Dunfermline Athletic (1)	0 – 0	Celtic (1)

=== Replays ===
Home team	Score	Away team
Celtic (1)	3 – 0	Dunfermline Athletic (1)
Stirling Albion (3)	0 – 1	Clydebank (2)

== Semi-finals ==
14 April 1990

Aberdeen (1)	4–0	Dundee United (1)
Gillhaus; Irvine; 2 Own Goals

Tynecastle Stadium, Edinburgh
Attendance: 16,581

14 April 1990

Celtic (1)	2–0	Clydebank (2)
Andy Walker

Hampden Park, Glasgow
Attendance: 34,768

== Final ==
12 May 1990

Aberdeen (1)	0–0 (a.e.t.)	Celtic (1)
Penalties
Bett (penalty scored); Connor (penalty scored); Gillhaus (penalty scored); Grant (penalty missed); Nicholas (penalty scored); McLeish (penalty scored); McKimmie (penalty scored); Robertson (penalty scored); Watson (penalty scored); Irvine (penalty scored)	9–8	(penalty missed) Wdowczyk; (penalty scored) Grant; (penalty scored) McStay; (penalty scored) Coyne; (penalty scored) Galloway; (penalty scored) Miller; (penalty scored) Whyte; (penalty scored) Elliott; (penalty scored) Dziekanowski; (penalty missed) Rogan

Hampden Park, Glasgow
Attendance: 60,493
Referee: George Smith

== Largest Wins ==
A list of the largest wins from the competition.

Score	Home team	Away team	Stage
8-0	Brechin City	Elgin City	Second Round (Replay)
7-0	Motherwell	Clyde	Third Round
2-6	Partick Thistle	Aberdeen	Third Round
6-2	Stirling Albion	Caledonian	Fourth Round
5-1	Hibernian	East Fife	Fourth Round

== See also ==
- 1989–90 in Scottish football
- 1989–90 Scottish League Cup
