= Graham Watson (footballer, born 1970) =

Scottish footballer

Personal information
- Date of birth: 11 September 1970 (age 56)
- Place of birth: St Andrews, Scotland
- Position: Defender

Youth career
- Deeside Boys Club

Senior career*
Years	Team	Apps	(Gls)
1989–1994	Aberdeen	15	(1)
1994–1996	Clyde	56	(0)
1996–1998	Livingston	56	(0)
1998–1999	Forfar Athletic	19	(0)
- Glenrothes
Total		146	(1)
- * Club domestic league appearances and goals

Graham Watson (born 11 September 1970) is a Scottish former footballer, who played for Aberdeen, Clyde, Livingston and Forfar Athletic.

Whilst at Aberdeen he played in the 1990 Scottish Cup Final and scored one of the penalties in the shootout as Aberdeen defeated Celtic.
