= Jim Bett =

Scottish footballer (born 1959)

Personal information
- Full name: James Bett
- Date of birth: 25 November 1959 (age 66)
- Place of birth: Hamilton, Scotland
- Position: Midfielder

Youth career
- Gartcosh United
- Dundee

Senior career*
| Years | Team | Apps | (Gls) |
| 1976–1978 | Airdrieonians | 8 | (0) |
| 1978 | Valur | 2 | (0) |
| 1978–1980 | Lokeren | 33 | (1) |
| 1980–1983 | Rangers | 104 | (21) |
| 1983–1985 | Lokeren | 64 | (7) |
| 1985–1994 | Aberdeen | 257 | (33) |
| 1994 | Valur | 13 | (4) |
| 1994–1995 | Heart of Midlothian | 26 | (2) |
| 1995–1996 | Dundee United | 23 | (2) |
| Total | | 530 | (70) |

International career
| 1980–1982 | Scotland U21 | 7 | (0) |
| 1982–1990 | Scotland | 26 | (1) |
- * Club domestic league appearances and goals

James Bett (born 25 November 1959) is a Scottish former professional footballer who played in midfield. He played with Aberdeen for nine seasons and had shorter spells at other clubs in Belgium, Iceland and Scotland. He earned 26 caps for the Scotland national team over eight years.

== Club career ==
A Scottish Schoolboy international born in Hamilton, South Lanarkshire, Bett started his club career with Gartcosh United, Dundee and Airdrieonians before moving to Icelandic side Valur in 1978. A year later he joined K.S.C. Lokeren (282) in Belgium.

Rangers manager John Greig paid £150,000 to sign Bett for the Glasgow club in 1980. In three seasons at Ibrox he won the Scottish Cup (1980–81) and a League Cup (1981–82). He left Rangers in 1983 for a second spell with Lokeren.

Bett returned to his native land, joining Alex Ferguson's Aberdeen in 1985 for £300,000. During his time with the Dons, he collected winner's medals in the Scottish Cup in 1985–86, and both the League Cup and Scottish Cup in 1989–90, He also played in three other League Cup finals – all ending in defeat to Rangers, and was in squads which finished runners-up behind his former club in the Scottish Premier Division on five occasions.

He left Pittodrie in 1994, after making over 300 first-team appearances. In 2003, Bett was inducted into the Aberdeen FC Hall of Fame as one of the founding members.

He next moved to KR Reykjavík and won the Icelandic Cup with the club, but left KR at the end of the 1994 Icelandic season. Bett returned to Scotland again to join Hearts with whom he played the 1994–95 Scottish season. After a final season with Dundee United, he retired.

== International career ==
During his spell with Rangers, Bett earned his first selection for the Scotland national side, making the first of 26 appearances in 1982. While playing for Aberdeen at club level, he was a member of the Scottish World Cup squads in 1986, where he did not play, and 1990, where his only appearance was in the opening 1–0 defeat to Costa Rica, which turned out to be the final cap of his career.

== Personal life ==
Bett met his Icelandic wife during his time playing for Valur and has maintained a close connection with Iceland since. His sons Baldur and Calum, also both professional footballers, were born there and have represented the country at Under-19 level. Coincidentally, Bett's only goal for Scotland occurred in a 1–0 win over Iceland in Reykjavík in 1985.

== Career statistics ==
=== Club ===
Appearances and goals by club, season and competition
| Club | Seasons | League | | | National cup | | League cup | | Europe | | Total | |
| Club | Seasons | Division | Apps | Goals | Apps | Goals | Apps | Goals | Apps | Goals | Apps | Goals |
|---|---|---|---|---|---|---|---|---|---|---|---|---|
| Airdrieonians | 1976–77 | Scottish First Division | 1 | 0 | 0 | 0 | 0 | 0 | – | | 1 | 0 |
| Airdrieonians | 1977–78 | Scottish First Division | 7 | 0 | 0 | 0 | 0 | 0 | – | | 7 | 0 |
| Airdrieonians | Total | | 8 | 0 | 0 | 0 | 0 | 0 | 0 | 0 | 8 | 0 |
| Valur Reykjavik | 1978 | Úrvalsdeild | 2 | 0 | 0 | 0 | 0 | 0 | 0 | 0 | 2 | 0 |
| Lokeren | 1978–79 | Belgian First Division | 0 | 0 | – | | – | | – | | 0+ | 0+ |
| Lokeren | 1979–80 | Belgian First Division | 33 | 1 | – | | – | | – | | 33+ | 1+ |
| Lokeren | Total | | 33 | 1 | 0 | 0 | 0 | 0 | 0 | 0 | 33+ | 1+ |
| Rangers | 1980–81 | Scottish Premier Division | 34 | 4 | 7 | 1 | 4 | 0 | 0 | 0 | 45 | 5 |
| Rangers | 1981–82 | Scottish Premier Division | 35 | 11 | 5 | 1 | 9 | 1 | 2 | 1 | 51 | 14 |
| Rangers | 1982–83 | Scottish Premier Division | 35 | 6 | 6 | 0 | 11 | 5 | 4 | 0 | 56 | 11 |
| Rangers | Total | | 104 | 21 | 18 | 2 | 24 | 6 | 6 | 1 | 152 | 30 |
| Lokeren | 1983–84 | Belgian First Division | 32 | 1 | – | | – | | – | | 32+ | 1+ |
| Lokeren | 1984–85 | Belgian First Division | 32 | 6 | – | | – | | – | | 32+ | 6+ |
| Lokeren | Total | | 64 | 7 | 0 | 0 | 0 | 0 | 0 | 0 | 64+ | 7+ |
| Aberdeen | 1985–86 | Scottish Premier Division | 24 | 3 | 6 | 0 | 3 | 0 | 4 | 0 | 37 | 3 |
| Aberdeen | 1986–87 | Scottish Premier Division | 38 | 4 | 3 | 1 | 2 | 0 | 2 | 1 | 45 | 6 |
| Aberdeen | 1987–88 | Scottish Premier Division | 38 | 10 | 5 | 0 | 5 | 3 | 3 | 1 | 51 | 14 |
| Aberdeen | 1988–89 | Scottish Premier Division | 30 | 5 | 5 | 0 | 5 | 3 | 2 | 0 | 42 | 8 |
| Aberdeen | 1989–90 | Scottish Premier Division | 30 | 3 | 4 | 1 | 5 | 2 | 2 | 0 | 41 | 6 |
| Aberdeen | 1990–91 | Scottish Premier Division | 36 | 7 | 1 | 0 | 3 | 2 | 4 | 0 | 44 | 9 |
| Aberdeen | 1991–92 | Scottish Premier Division | 38 | 1 | 1 | 0 | 2 | 0 | 2 | 0 | 43 | 1 |
| Aberdeen | 1992–93 | Scottish Premier Division | 17 | 0 | 1 | 0 | 4 | 0 | 0 | 0 | 22 | 0 |
| Aberdeen | 1993–94 | Scottish Premier Division | 6 | 0 | 2 | 0 | 3 | 0 | 2 | 0 | 13 | 0 |
| Aberdeen | Total | | 257 | 33 | 28 | 2 | 32 | 10 | 21 | 2 | 338 | 47 |
| Valur Reykjavik | 1994 | Úrvalsdeild | 13 | 4 | – | | – | | – | | 13+ | 4+ |
| Heart of Midlothian | 1994–95 | Scottish Premier Division | 26 | 2 | 4 | 0 | 0 | 0 | 0 | 0 | 30 | 2 |
| Dundee United | 1995–96 | Scottish First Division | 23 | 2 | 0 | 0 | 1 | 0 | – | | 24 | 2 |
| Career total | | | 530 | 70 | 50+ | 4+ | 57+ | 16+ | 27+ | 3+ | 664+ | 93+ |

=== International ===
Appearances and goals by national team and year
| National team | Year | Apps | Goals |
|---|---|---|---|
| Scotland | 1982 | 2 | 0 |
| Scotland | 1983 | 1 | 0 |
| Scotland | 1984 | 6 | 0 |
| Scotland | 1985 | 6 | 1 |
| Scotland | 1986 | 2 | 0 |
| Scotland | 1987 | 2 | 0 |
| Scotland | 1988 | 1 | 0 |
| Scotland | 1989 | 2 | 0 |
| Scotland | 1990 | 4 | 0 |
| Total | | 26 | 1 |

Scores and results list Scotland's goal tally first, score column indicates score after each Bett goal.

List of international goals scored by Jim Bett
| No. | Date | Venue | Opponent | Score | Result | Competition |
|---|---|---|---|---|---|---|
| 1 | 28 May 1985 | Laugardalsvöllur, Reykjavík, Iceland | Iceland | 1–0 | 1–0 | 1986 FIFA World Cup qualification |

== Honours ==
Rangers

- Scottish Cup: 1980–81; runner-up 1981–82, 1982–83
- Scottish League Cup: 1981–82; runner-up 1982–83

Aberdeen

- Scottish Cup: 1985–86, 1989–90 ; runner-up 1992–93
- Scottish League Cup: 1989–90; runner-up 1987–88, 1988–89, 1992–93

Scotland

- The Rous Cup: 1985
