= Paul Elliott (footballer) =

English footballer

Paul Elliott CBE
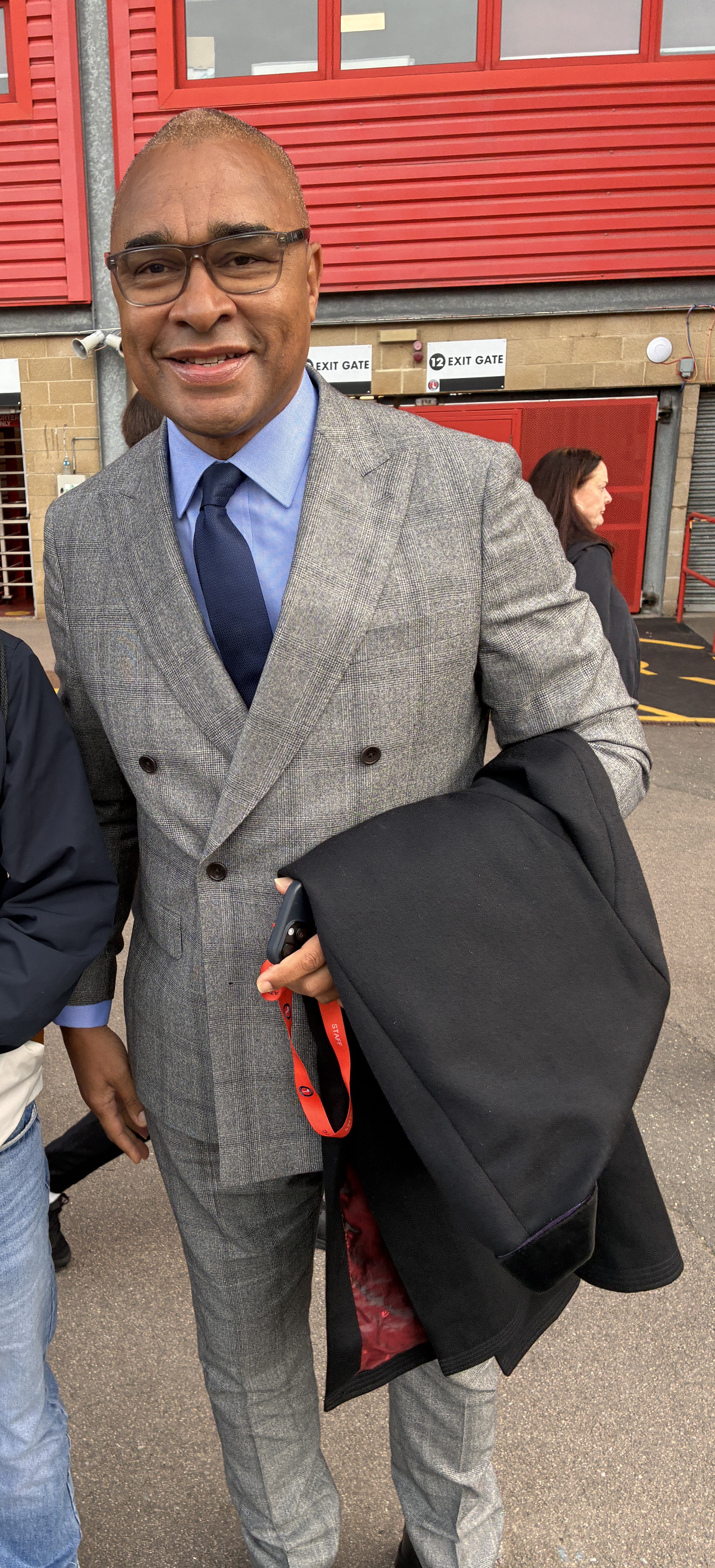
- Paul Elliott in 2025.

Personal information
- Full name: Paul Marcellus Elliott
- Date of birth: 18 March 1964 (age 62)
- Place of birth: Lewisham, London, England
- Height: 6 ft 2 in (1.88 m)
- Position: Defender

Senior career*
Years	Team	Apps	(Gls)
1980–1983	Charlton Athletic	63	(1)
1983–1985	Luton Town	66	(4)
1985–1987	Aston Villa	57	(7)
1987–1989	Pisa	23	(1)
1989–1991	Celtic	52	(2)
1991–1994	Chelsea	42	(3)
Total		303	(18)

International career
1981–1982	England Youth	6	(0)
1984–1986	England U21	3	(1)
1991	England B	1	(0)
- * Club domestic league appearances and goals

Paul Marcellus Elliott CBE (born 18 March 1964) is an English former footballer who played as a defender.

== Playing career ==
Starting his career with Charlton Athletic in the early 1980s, Elliott signed for First Division Luton Town in 1983. He then joined Aston Villa in 1985 and spent two years at Italian club Pisa before joining Celtic in 1989. In his final season at Parkhead, Elliott was awarded the Scottish Footballer of the Year award. In the summer of 1991, he signed for Chelsea for £1,400,000.

In September 1992, Elliott sustained a serious knee injury, resulting from a challenge by Liverpool's Dean Saunders. He never played again and on 10 May 1994 – just four days before Chelsea lost to Manchester United in their first FA Cup final since 1970 – Elliott announced his retirement after failing to recover from the injury. Player and club had been confident of a return to action in 1993–94 and he had been issued with the number 22 shirt with the introduction of squad numbers in the FA Premier League.

Just after his retirement, Elliott filed a lawsuit against Saunders seeking damages for the career-ending injury. However, he lost the case when a civil court found that Saunders was not at fault. Elliott was often a pundit on Football Italia.

== Post-playing career ==
In 2003, Elliott was appointed Member of the Order of the British Empire (MBE) for his work with young players and his involvement with anti-racism initiatives in football. He was appointed Commander of the Order of the British Empire (CBE) in the 2012 Birthday Honours for services to equality and diversity in football.

Elliott resigned from his roles with The FA, as a member of the Association's Judicial Panel and as a nominated member of UEFA committees on 23 February 2013. He also left his role at Kick It Out. The FA accepted his resignation following a reported text conversation in which "discriminatory abusive comments" were made to fellow former footballer Richard Rufus. On 15 July 2014, Elliott rejoined the Inclusion Advisory Board.

Elliott was a victim of Rufus's multi-million-pound investment fraud, for which Rufus was jailed for seven and a half years in 2023.

== Personal life ==
Elliott is of Jamaican descent, his grandmother having emigrated to England as part of the Windrush generation.

== Honours ==
Individual

- SPFA Players' Player of the Year: 1990–91
- Chelsea Player of the Year: 1992
