= George Smith (referee) =

Scottish football referee (1943–2019)

George Smith (14 October 1943 – 13 May 2019) was a Scottish football referee. He is best known for refereeing at the 1990 FIFA World Cup in Italy, where he officiated the game between Austria and Czechoslovakia, handing out seven yellow cards in what was a rough game.

Smith took charge of the 1980 (Celtic v Rangers), 1988 (Celtic v Dundee United) and 1990 (Aberdeen v Celtic) Scottish Cup finals. He also took charge of the 1988 (Aberdeen v Rangers) and 1989 (Aberdeen v Rangers) Scottish League Cup finals.

Smith died on 13 May 2019, aged 75.
