= 1990–91 Scottish First Division =

Scottish First Division
- Season: 1990–91
- Champions: Falkirk
- Promoted: Falkirk; Airdrieonians
- Relegated: Clyde; Brechin City
- Matches played: 273
- Goals scored: 767 (2.81 per match)
- Top goalscorer: Gordon Dalziel (25)
- Biggest home win: Falkirk 7–1 Raith Rovers, 03.11.1990
- Biggest away win: Meadowbank Thistle 1–8 Kilmarnock, 10.04.1991

The 1990–91 Scottish First Division season was won by Falkirk, who were promoted along with Airdrieonians to the Premier Division. Clyde and Brechin City were relegated to the Second Division.

== League table ==
Pos	Team	Pld	W	D	L	GF	GA	GD	Pts	Promotion or relegation
1	Falkirk (C, P)	39	21	12	6	70	35	+35	54	Promotion to the Premier Division
2	Airdrieonians (P)	39	21	11	7	69	43	+26	53	Promotion to the Premier Division
3	Dundee	39	22	8	9	59	33	+26	52	
4	Partick Thistle	39	16	13	10	56	53	+3	45	
5	Kilmarnock	39	15	13	11	58	48	+10	43	
6	Hamilton Academical	39	16	10	13	50	41	+9	42	
7	Raith Rovers	39	14	9	16	54	64	−10	37	
8	Clydebank	39	13	10	16	65	70	−5	36	
9	Morton	39	11	13	15	48	55	−7	35	
10	Forfar Athletic	39	9	15	15	50	57	−7	33	
11	Meadowbank Thistle	39	10	13	16	56	68	−12	33	
12	Ayr United	39	10	12	17	47	59	−12	32	
13	Clyde (R)	39	9	9	21	41	61	−20	27	Relegation to the Second Division
14	Brechin City (R)	39	7	10	22	44	80	−36	24	Relegation to the Second Division

Source: RSSSF and statto
Rules for classification: 1) points; 2) goal difference; 3) number of goals scored.
(C) Champions; (P) Promoted; (R) Relegated
