= Hans Gillhaus =

Dutch footballer

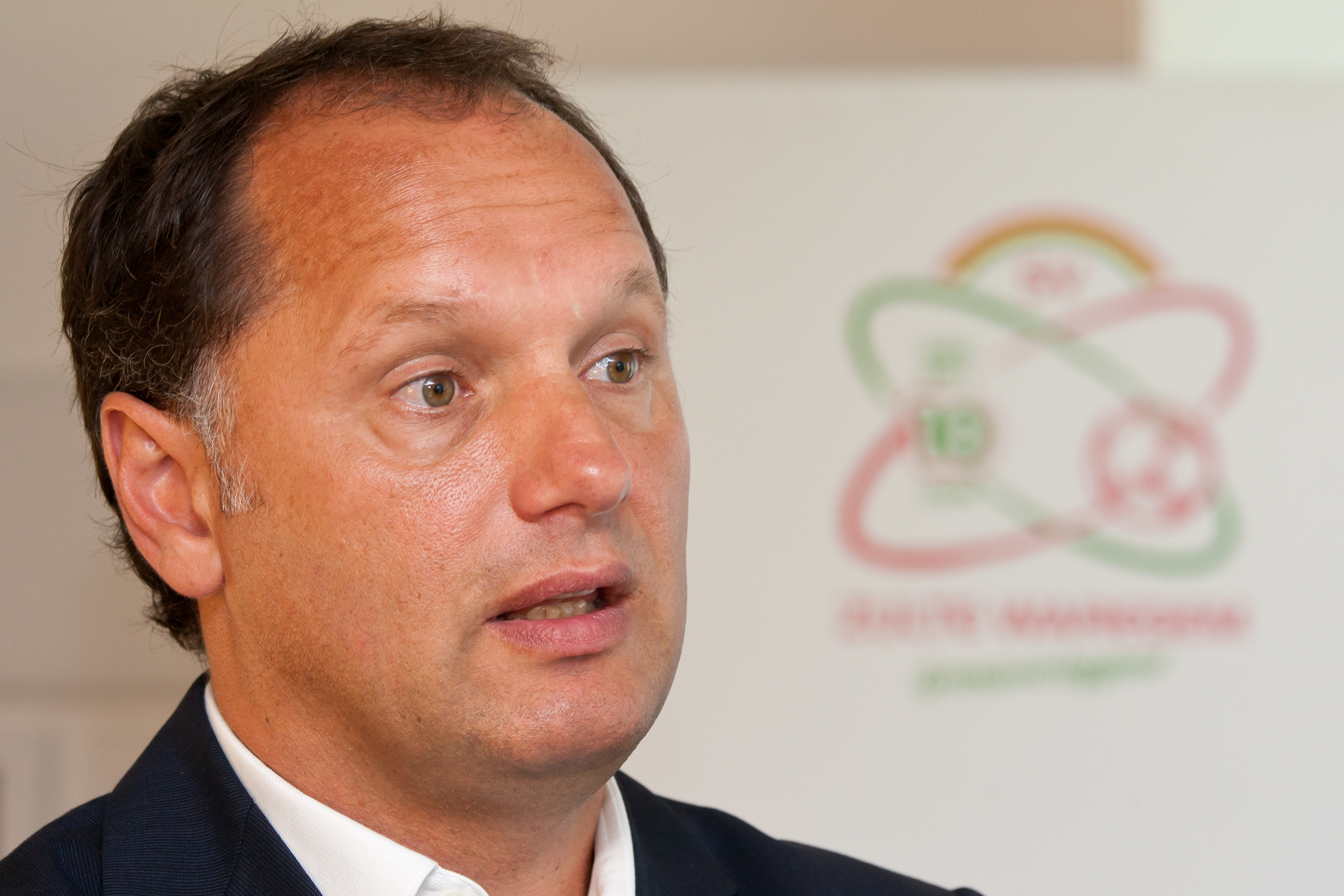
- Gillhaus in 2011

Personal information
- Full name: Johannes Paulus Gillhaus
- Date of birth: 5 November 1963 (age 62)
- Place of birth: Helmond, Netherlands
- Height: 1.75 m (5 ft 9 in)
- Position: Forward

Senior career*
Years	Team	Apps	(Gls)
1983–1987	Den Bosch	106	(45)
1987–1989	PSV	67	(23)
1989–1993	Aberdeen	78	(27)
1993–1995	Vitesse	54	(33)
1995–1996	Gamba Osaka	60	(28)
1996–1997	AZ	11	(1)
1998	FF Jaro	7	(2)
1998–1999	Den Bosch	17	(2)
Total		400	(161)

International career
1987–1994	Netherlands	9	(2)
1990	Scottish League	1	(1)
- * Club domestic league appearances and goals

Johannes "Hans" Paulus Gillhaus (born 5 November 1963) is a Dutch retired professional footballer who played primarily as a left-sided forward.

During a 16-year professional career, he amassed Eredivisie totals of 348 games and 146 goals, mainly in representation of Den Bosch and PSV, also playing abroad in Scotland, Japan and Finland.

Gillhaus represented the Netherlands at the 1990 World Cup.

== Club career ==
=== Early years and PSV ===
Born in Helmond, North Brabant, Gillhaus started playing professionally for FC Den Bosch, making his Eredivisie debuts in 1983–84 (12 games, three goals), then proceeding to score 33 league goals in his last two seasons combined.

In the 1987 summer, A.C. Milan bought Ruud Gullit from PSV Eindhoven for a world-record transfer fee £6,000,000, and that money was soon used in the acquisition of Gillhaus, Wim Kieft and Søren Lerby. The former netted 15 goals in only 26 games in his first season, helping the Philips club to a historic treble – he appeared 105 minutes in the campaign's European Cup final, a 0–0 penalty shootout win against S.L. Benfica.

=== Aberdeen ===
With the arrival of Brazilian Romário, Gillhaus found himself relegated to a substitute role at PSV. In November 1989, he signed with Aberdeen for £650,000 (3,000,000 in today's money), made an immediate impact on his debut, scoring two goals (including an overhead kick) against Dunfermline Athletic in a 3–0 win at East End Park; this was followed in the next fixture by the game's only goal against Rangers, netting through a left-foot curling shot into the top corner at Pittodrie.

While with Aberdeen, Gillhaus collected a Scottish Cup winners medal in 1989–90, scoring twice en route to the final against Celtic and starting in decisive match, another penalty shootout triumph.

=== Late career ===
Gillhaus left Aberdeen in early March 1993 after falling out of favour with manager Willie Miller, moving to Vitesse Arnhem for £300,000. He scored a career-best 22 goals in his first full season, as they finished fourth and qualified to the UEFA Cup.

Aged 31, Gillhaus moved abroad again, signing for Gamba Osaka in the Japanese J-League. In 1998, he played in Finland with FF Jaro, and retired at the end of the following season at nearly 36 after helping first club Den Bosch return to the top flight.

== International career ==
Gillhaus made his debut for Netherlands on 28 October 1987, in a UEFA Euro 1988 qualifier against Cyprus in Rotterdam (8–0 win), a game marred by the "bomb incident". In the same competition, on 16 December, he scored his only two goals for the national team in a 3–0 away win against Greece, but was not selected for the squad that competed in the final stages in Germany, eventually winning the tournament.

Gillhaus was picked by manager Leo Beenhakker for the 1990 FIFA World Cup in Italy, appearing in three games (two starts) in an eventual round-of-16 exit.

== Post-playing career ==
Immediately after retiring from playing, Gillhaus returned to PSV and worked there as a scout for six years, after which he joined, in the same capacity, Chelsea. On 23 August 2011, after also six years with the Blues, he was appointed director of football at Zulte Waregem.

In March 2014, Gillhaus signed for Sunderland, co-ordinating its European scouting network. He returned to PSV as a scout in 2022 after also working for Arsenal.

== Career statistics ==
=== Club ===
Appearances and goals by club, season and competition
Club	Season	League			National cup (Note: Includes KNVB Cup, Scottish Cup, Emperor's Cup, and Finnish Cup)		League cup (Note: Includes Dutch Super Cup, Scottish League Cup, J.League Cup, and Finnish League Cup)		Continental (Note: Includes European Cup, UEFA Cup Winners' Cup, UEFA Cup, and European Super Cup)		Total	
Club	Season	Division	Apps	Goals	Apps	Goals	Apps	Goals	Apps	Goals	Apps	Goals
Den Bosch	1983–84	Eredivisie	12	3			—		—		12	3
Den Bosch	1984–85	Eredivisie	26	9			—		—		26	9
Den Bosch	1985–86	Eredivisie	34	16			—		—		34	16
Den Bosch	1986–87	Eredivisie	34	17			—		—		34	17
Den Bosch	Total		106	45			—		—		106	45
PSV	1987–88	Eredivisie	26	15					8	3	34	18
PSV	1988–89	Eredivisie	34	7					7	1	41	8
PSV	1989–90	Eredivisie	7	1	—		—		2	0	9	1
PSV	Total		67	23					17	4	84	27
Aberdeen	1989–90	Scottish Premier Division	19	8	4	3	0	0	—		23	11
Aberdeen	1990–91	Scottish Premier Division	35	14	1	0	3	0	4	1	43	15
Aberdeen	1991–92	Scottish Premier Division	24	5	1	0	2	0			27	5
Aberdeen	Total		78	27	6	3	5	0	4	1	93	31
Vitesse	1992–93	Eredivisie	12	6	0	0	—		—		12	6
Vitesse	1993–94	Eredivisie	32	22	1	0	—		2	0	35	22
Vitesse	1994–95	Eredivisie	10	5	1	1	—		2	1	13	7
Vitesse	Total		54	33	2	1	—		4	1	60	35
Gamba Osaka	1995	J1 League	37	20	4	4	—		—		41	24
Gamba Osaka	1996	J1 League	23	8	4	2	13	4	—		40	14
Gamba Osaka	Total		60	28	8	6	13	4	—		81	38
AZ	1996–97	Eredivisie	11	1			—		—		11	1
Jaro	1998	Veikkausliiga	7	2					—		7	2
Den Bosch	1998–99	Eerste Divisie	17	2			—		—		17	2
Career total			417	163	16	10	18	4	25	6	476	183

=== International ===
Appearances and goals by national team and year
National team	Year	Apps	Goals
Netherlands	1987	2	2
Netherlands	1988	0	0
Netherlands	1989	0	0
Netherlands	1990	5	0
Netherlands	1991	0	0
Netherlands	1992	0	0
Netherlands	1993	0	0
Netherlands	1994	2	0
Total		9	2

Scores and results list the Netherlands' goal tally first, score column indicates score after each Gillhaus goal.

List of international goals scored by Hans Gillhaus
No.	Date	Venue	Opponent	Score	Result	Competition
1	16 December 1987	Diagoras Stadium, Rhodos, Greece	Greece	2–0	3–0	UEFA Euro 1988 qualification
2	16 December 1987	Diagoras Stadium, Rhodos, Greece	Greece	3–0	3–0	UEFA Euro 1988 qualification

== Honours ==
PSV

- Eredivisie: 1987–88, 1988–89
- KNVB Cup: 1987–88, 1988–89
- European Cup: 1987–88
- European Super Cup runner-up: 1988

Aberdeen

- Scottish Cup: 1989–90

Den Bosch

- Eerste Divisie: 1998–99
