= Gregg Watson =

Scottish footballer

Personal information
- Date of birth: 21 September 1970 (age 56)
- Place of birth: Glasgow, Scotland
- Position: Defender

Senior career*
Years	Team	Apps	(Gls)
1988–1992	Aberdeen	23	(0)
1993–1998	Partick Thistle	198	(2)
1998–1999	Livingston	28	(1)
1999–2000	Stenhousemuir	27	(1)
2000–2003	Alloa Athletic	69	(3)
- * Club domestic league appearances and goals

Gregg Watson (born 21 September 1970) is a Scottish former footballer.

== Playing career ==
Gregg Watson was born in Glasgow in 1970. He signed for Aberdeen FC from Eastercraigs Boys Club in 1986. He played 23 league games for Aberdeen before moving to Partick Thistle FC in 1993. He played the bulk of his games at Firhill, making over 200 appearances for the first team in five years there. In 1998, he joined Livingston FC, where he was part of the team which won the 1998-1999 Scottish Second Division Championship. During the 1999-2000 season, he signed for Stenhousemuir FC and thereafter joined Alloa Athletic FC in 2000, where he spent three seasons and was part of the team which won promotion to the First Division in 2002. His last club was junior team Linlithgow Rose FC who he joined in 2003 and played with for two seasons.

== Honours ==
Livingston

- Scottish League Second Division 1999
