= 1988–89 Scottish League Cup =

Tournament details
- Country: Scotland

Final positions
- Champions: Rangers
- Runners-up: Aberdeen

The 1988–89 Scottish League Cup was the forty-third season of Scotland's second football knockout competition. The competition was won by Rangers, who defeated Aberdeen in the Final.

== First round ==
Home team	Score	Away team	Date
Alloa Athletic (3)	2–4	Stirling Albion (3)	10 August 1988
Brechin City (3)	3–1	Montrose (3)	10 August 1988
Cowdenbeath (3)	0–0	Albion Rovers (3)	10 August 1988
East Stirlingshire (3)	0–1	Arbroath (3)	11 August 1988
Queen's Park (3)	1–2	Stranraer (3)	10 August 1988
Stenhousemuir (3)	3–0	Berwick Rangers (3)	10 August 1988

== Second round ==
Home team	Score	Away team	Date
Aberdeen (1)	4–0	Arbroath (3)	17 August 1988
Airdrieonians (2)	0–1	Motherwell (1)	17 August 1988
Albion Rovers (3)	2–4	Hamilton Academical (1)	16 August 1988
Brechin City (3)	0–2	Morton (2)	17 August 1988
Celtic (1)	4–1	Ayr United (2)	17 August 1988
Clyde (2)	0–3	Rangers (1)	17 August 1988
Clydebank (2)	2–0	Stenhousemuir (3)	17 August 1988
Dumbarton (3)	1–3	St Mirren (1)	16 August 1988
Dundee (1)	5–1	Queen of the South(2)	17 August 1988
East Fife (3)	1–1	Dunfermline Athletic (2)	17 August 1988
Falkirk (2)	1–1	Raith Rovers (2)	17 August 1988
Heart of Midlothian (1)	5–0	St Johnstone (2)	17 August 1988
Hibernian (1)	4–0	Stranraer (3)	17 August 1988
Kilmarnock (2)	1–0	Forfar Athletic (2)	17 August 1988
Meadowbank Thistle (2)	2–1	Stirling Albion (3)	16 August 1988
Partick Thistle (2)	0–2	Dundee United (1)	16 August 1988

== Third round ==
Home team	Score	Away team	Date
Celtic (1)	7–2	Hamilton Academical (1)	24 August 1988
Dundee (1)	2–1	Falkirk (2)	24 August 1988
Dunfermline Athletic (2)	2–1	Motherwell (1)	24 August 1988
Morton (2)	1–2	Aberdeen (1)	23 August 1988
Hibernian (1)	1–0	Kilmarnock (2)	23 August 1988
Meadowbank Thistle (2)	0–2	Heart of Midlothian (1)	23 August 1988
Rangers (1)	6–0	Clydebank (2)	24 August 1988
St Mirren (1)	1–3	Dundee United (1)	24 August 1988

== Quarter-finals ==
Home team	Score	Away team	Date
Dundee United (1)	2–0	Celtic (1)	31 August 1988
Dunfermline Athletic (2)	1–4	Heart of Midlothian (1)	31 August 1988
Hibernian (1)	1–2	Aberdeen (1)	31 August 1988
Rangers (1)	4–1	Dundee (1)	31 August 1988

== Semi-finals ==
Home team	Score	Away team	Date
Aberdeen (1)	2–0	Dundee United (1)	20 September 1988
Rangers (1)	3–0	Heart of Midlothian (1)	21 September 1988

== Final ==
23 October 1988

Aberdeen (1)	2–3	Rangers (1)
Dodds		McCoist; Ferguson

Hampden Park, Glasgow
Attendance: 72,122
Referee: George Smith
