= Ian Robertson (footballer, born 1966) =

Scottish footballer

Personal information
- Date of birth: 14 October 1966 (age 60)
- Place of birth: Inverness, Scotland
- Position: Defender

Senior career*
Years	Team	Apps	(Gls)
1983–1991	Aberdeen	21	(0)
1991–1996	Montrose	138	(4)
Total		159	(4)
- * Club domestic league appearances and goals

Ian Robertson (born 14 October 1966) is a Scottish former football player who played as a right-back.

== Playing career ==
Ian Robertson was born in Inverness in 1966. He began his professional career with Aberdeen in 1983, making his debut in a 3–2 win over St Mirren in a league game in May 1984. Having made just a handful of appearances for the Dons in the 1980s, he joined Montrose in 1991 where he remained until he retired in 1996.
