= 1989–90 Scottish Premier Division =

84th season of top-tier football league in Scotland

Scottish Premier Division
- Season: 1989–90
- Champions: Rangers; 5th Premier Division title 40th Scottish title
- European Cup: Rangers
- UEFA Cup: Heart of Midlothian; Dundee United
- Cup Winners' Cup: Aberdeen
- Matches: 180
- Goals: 412 (2.29 per match)
- Top goalscorer: John Robertson (17)

The 1989–90 Scottish Premier Division season was won by Rangers, seven points ahead of Aberdeen. Dundee were relegated.

== Table ==
Pos	Team	Pld	W	D	L	GF	GA	GD	Pts	Qualification or relegation
1	Rangers (C)	36	20	11	5	48	19	+29	51	Qualification for the European Cup first round
2	Aberdeen	36	17	10	9	56	33	+23	44	Qualification for the Cup Winners' Cup first round
3	Heart of Midlothian	36	16	12	8	54	35	+19	44	Qualification for the UEFA Cup first round
4	Dundee United	36	11	13	12	36	39	−3	35	Qualification for the UEFA Cup first round
5	Celtic	36	10	14	12	37	37	0	34	
6	Motherwell	36	11	12	13	43	47	−4	34	
7	Hibernian	36	12	10	14	34	41	−7	34	
8	Dunfermline Athletic	36	11	8	17	37	50	−13	30	
9	St Mirren	36	10	10	16	28	48	−20	30	
10	Dundee (R)	36	5	14	17	41	65	−24	24	Relegation to the 1990–91 Scottish First Division

Source: RSSSF
Rules for classification: 1) points; 2) goal difference; 3) number of goals scored.
(C) Champions; (R) Relegated

== Results ==
=== Matches 1–18 ===
During matches 1-18 each team plays every other team twice (home and away).

Home \ Away	ABE	CEL	DND	DNU	DNF	HOM	HIB	MOT	RAN	STM
Aberdeen		1–1	1–0	2–0	2–1	1–3	1–0	1–0	1–0	5–0
Celtic	1–0		4–1	0–1	1–0	2–1	3–1	1–1	1–1	1–1
Dundee	1–1	1–3		4–3	1–2	2–2	0–0	2–1	0–2	3–3
Dundee United	2–0	2–2	0–0		2–1	2–1	1–0	1–1	1–1	0–0
Dunfermline Athletic	0–3	2–0	2–1	1–1		0–2	0–0	1–1	1–1	5–1
Heart of Midlothian	1–1	1–3	6–3	1–1	1–2		1–0	3–0	1–2	4–0
Hibernian	0–3	0–3	3–2	2–0	2–2	1–1		3–2	2–0	3–1
Motherwell	0–0	0–0	3–0	3–2	1–1	1–3	0–2		1–0	3–1
Rangers	1–0	1–0	2–2	2–1	3–0	1–0	3–0	3–0		0–1
St Mirren	0–2	1–0	3–2	1–0	2–0	1–2	0–0	2–2	0–2	

Legend: Blue = home team win; Yellow = draw; Red = away team win.

=== Matches 19–36 ===
During matches 19-36 each team plays every other team a further two times (home and away).

Home \ Away	ABE	CEL	DND	DNU	DNF	HOM	HIB	MOT	RAN	STM
Aberdeen		1–1	5–2	1–0	4–1	2–2	1–2	2–0	0–0	2–0
Celtic	1–3		1–1	3–0	0–2	1–1	1–1	0–1	0–1	0–3
Dundee	1–1	0–0		1–1	1–0	0–1	2–0	1–2	2–2	1–2
Dundee United	1–1	2–0	1–2		1–0	1–1	1–0	1–1	0–1	2–0
Dunfermline Athletic	2–4	0–0	1–0	0–1		0–1	1–1	0–5	0–1	1–0
Heart of Midlothian	1–0	0–0	0–0	3–2	0–2		2–0	2–0	1–1	0–0
Hibernian	3–2	1–0	1–1	0–0	2–1	1–2		1–2	0–0	0–1
Motherwell	2–2	1–1	3–1	0–1	1–3	0–3	1–0		1–1	2–0
Rangers	2–0	3–0	3–0	3–1	2–0	0–0	0–1	2–1		1–0
St Mirren	1–0	0–2	0–0	0–0	1–2	2–0	0–1	0–0	0–0	

Legend: Blue = home team win; Yellow = draw; Red = away team win.

== Awards ==
- Player awards

Award	Winner	Club
PFA Players' Player of the Year	(Scotland) Jim Bett	Aberdeen
PFA Young Player of the Year	(Scotland) Scott Crabbe	Heart of Midlothian
SFWA Footballer of the Year	(Scotland) Alex McLeish	Aberdeen

- Manager awards

Award	Winner	Club
SFWA Manager of the Year	(Scotland) Andy Roxburgh	Scotland national team

== See also ==
- Nine in a row

== Bibliography ==
- RSSSF
