= Craig Robertson (footballer) =

Scottish footballer & coach (born 1963)

Personal information
- Date of birth: 22 April 1963 (age 63)
- Place of birth: Dunfermline, Scotland
- Height: 5 ft 9 in (1.75 m)
- Position: Midfielder

Youth career
- 1979–1980: Hearts

Senior career*
Years	Team	Apps	(Gls)
1980–1987	Raith Rovers	170	(21)
1987–1988	Dunfermline Athletic	55	(18)
1988–1991	Aberdeen	34	(4)
1991–1998	Dunfermline Athletic	179	(13)

Managerial career
- 2006: Dunfermline Athletic (Caretaker Manager)
- * Club domestic league appearances and goals

Craig Robertson (born 22 April 1963) is a Scottish former football player and coach who spent most of his career in Fife playing for Dunfermline Athletic and Raith Rovers, broken up by a spell with Aberdeen.

== Playing career ==
Craig Robertson was born in Dunfermline in 1963. He joined Raith Rovers from Hearts in 1980, and stayed with the Kirkcaldy-based club until 1987, when he was signed by his home town team Dunfermline Athletic for £25,000. In his first season with the Pars he was the top-scoring midfielder in the league, despite the side being relegated.

After 18 months with Dunfermline, Robertson was signed by Aberdeen in December 1988 for a fee of £150,000. His first team opportunities at Pittodrie were limited, making only 34 appearances in three seasons and so in 1991 he was re-signed by Dunfermline. After the death of Norrie McCathie in January 1996, Robertson was given the task of taking over as club captain. The first match after McCathie's death was a home tie against Clydebank in which Robertson scored in the last minute to give the Pars a 4–3 victory. The goal itself has been described by Clydebank midfielder Graham Connell as a "wonder goal", with Dunfermline fans simply referring to it as "the goal".

Robertson continued to captain the side until 1998, when he was released by the club and retired from football.

== Later career ==
After retiring, Robertson later became assistant manager at Dunfermline Athletic, and became caretaker manager in 2006 following the resignation of Jim Leishman. In 2008, he returned to Aberdeen after being appointed as chief scout, where he remained until Derek McInnes was appointed Aberdeen manager in 2013.

== Career statistics ==
=== Manager ===
As of 8 January 2016

Team	Nat	From	To	Record				
Team	Nat	From	To	G	W	D	L	Win %
Dunfermline Athletic (Note: As caretaker manager)	(Scotland)	26 October 2006	10 November 2006	2	0	1	1	0.00
Total				2	0	1	1	0.00
