= 1989–90 Scottish League Cup =

Tournament details
- Country: Scotland

Final positions
- Champions: Aberdeen
- Runners-up: Rangers

The 1989–90 Scottish League Cup was the forty-fourth season of Scotland's second football knockout competition. The competition was won by Aberdeen, who defeated Rangers in the Final.

== First round ==
Home team	Score	Away team	Date
Arbroath (3)	1–0	East Stirlingshire (3)	9 August 1989
Cowdenbeath (3)	0–4	Montrose (3)	9 August 1989
Dumbarton (3)	3–0	Stenhousemuir (3)	8 August 1989
East Fife (3)	2–2	Queen's Park (3)	9 August 1989
Stirling Albion (3)	0–3	Berwick Rangers (3)	9 August 1989
Stranraer (3)	3–4	Brechin City (3)	9 August 1989

== Second round ==
Home team	Score	Away team	Date
Airdrieonians (2)	4–0	Forfar Athletic (2)	15 August 1989
Albion Rovers (2)	0–2	Aberdeen (1)	16 August 1989
Ayr United (2)	0–1	Hamilton Academical (2)	15 August 1989
Berwick Rangers (3)	0–2	St Mirren (1)	15 August 1989
Brechin City (3)	0–3	Falkirk (2)	16 August 1989
Clydebank (2)	3–1	Meadowbank Thistle (2)	16 August 1989
Dumbarton (3)	0–3	Celtic (1)	15 August 1989
Dundee (1)	5–1	Clyde (3)	15 August 1989
Dundee United (1)	1–0	Partick Thistle (2)	16 August 1989
Dunfermline Athletic (1)	3–0	Raith Rovers (2)	15 August 1989
Heart of Midlothian (1)	3–0	Montrose (3)	16 August 1989
Hibernian (1)	2–0	Alloa Athletic (2)	15 August 1989
Kilmarnock (3)	1–4	Motherwell (1)	15 August 1989
Queen of the South (3)	1–0	St Johnstone (2)	16 August 1989
Queen's Park (3)	0–1	Morton (2)	15 August 1989
Rangers (1)	4–0	Arbroath (3)	15 August 1989

== Third round ==
Home team	Score	Away team	Date
Aberdeen (1)	4–0	Airdrieonians (2)	23 August 1989
Celtic (1)	2–0	Queen of the South (3)	22 August 1989
Dunfermline Athletic (1)	1–0	Dundee (1)	23 August 1989
Falkirk (2)	1–4	Heart of Midlothian (1)	23 August 1989
Hamilton Academical (2)	2–1	Dundee United (1)	23 August 1989
Hibernian (1)	0–0	Clydebank (3)	22 August 1989
Morton(2)	1–2	Rangers (1)	23 August 1989
St Mirren (1)	1–0	Motherwell (1)	23 August 1989

== Quarter-finals ==
Home team	Score	Away team	Date
Aberdeen (1)	3–1	St Mirren (1)	30 August 1989
Hamilton Academical (2)	0–3	Rangers (1)	30 August 1989
Heart of Midlothian (1)	2–2	Celtic (1)	30 August 1989
Hibernian (1)	1–3	Dunfermline Athletic (1)	29 August 1989

== Semi-finals ==
Home team	Score	Away team	Date
Aberdeen (1)	1–0	Celtic (1)	20 September 1989
Rangers (1)	5–0	Dunfermline Athletic (1)	19 September 1989

== Final ==
22 October 1989

Aberdeen (1)	2 – 1 (AET)	Rangers (1)
Mason		Walters pen'

Hampden Park, Glasgow
Attendance: 61,190
Referee: George Smith
