= 2000–01 Dundee United F.C. season =

Dundee United
2000–01 season
- Chairman: Jim McLean (until 14 October); Doug Smith (from 17 October)
- Manager: Paul Sturrock (until 7 August); Alex Smith (from 8 August)
- Stadium: Tannadice Park
- SPL: Eleventh place
- Scottish Cup: Semi-finals
- League Cup: Quarter-finals
- Top goalscorer: League: Derek Lilley (6); All: Derek Lilley (7)
- Highest home attendance: 12,306 vs. Celtic, SPL 26 December 2000
- Lowest home attendance: 5,497 vs. Kilmarnock, SPL, 28 November 2000
Home colours	Away colours

The 2000–01 season was the 92nd year of football played by Dundee United, and covers the period from 1 July 2000 to 30 June 2001. United finished in eleventh place in the Scottish Premier League, in the first year of the league split, brought on by the expansion of the league from ten to twelve teams.

== Summary ==
Dundee United played a total of 46 competitive matches during the 2000–01 season. The team finished eleventh in the Scottish Premier League.

In the cup competitions, United were knocked out of the League Cup at the semi-finals stage, losing to Rangers. Celtic knocked United out of the Scottish Cup at the semi-final stage. Both matches finished 1–0.

The club's playing kits were sponsored by Telewest for a fifth season.

Of Derek Lilley's six league goals, only one - in the 3–1 defeat at Dunfermline Athletic - failed to achieve points for United.

Sixteen players were signed during the 2000–01 season, with a total transfer cost of around £350,000. In addition, one player was signed on loan. Sixteen players left the club during the season with only one transfer - Scott McCulloch to Cardiff City - bringing in a fee of £100k.

Alex Smith would pick up the manager of the month award for March and May 2001 as United results meant they moved clear of the relegation zone.

== Results and fixtures ==
All results are written with Dundee United's score first.

=== Scottish Premier League ===
Date	Opponent	Venue	Result	Attendance	Scorers
30 July 2000	Celtic	H	1–2	11,761	McCracken
5 August 2000	Hibernian	A	0–3	9,541	
12 August 2000	Motherwell	H	1–1	6,201	Paterson
19 August 2000	St Johnstone	H	1–2	6,636	Aljofree
26 August 2000	Dunfermline Athletic	A	0–1	4,980	
9 September 2000	Kilmarnock	A	0–1	6,380	
16 September 2000	St Mirren	H	0–0	5,943	
20 September 2000	Dundee	A	0–3	9,838	
23 September 2000	Aberdeen	H	3–5	7,699	Easton, McConalogue, Hannah
1 October 2000	Rangers	A	0–3	44,324	
14 October 2000	Heart of Midlothian	H	0–4	7,016	
21 October 2000	Celtic	A	1–2	59,427	Own goal
28 October 2000	Hibernian	H	0–1	8,042	
4 November 2000	Motherwell	A	1–2	6,864	Naveda
11 November 2000	Dundee	H	0–2	11,454	
18 November 2000	St Johnstone	A	0–1	4,295	
25 November 2000	Dunfermline Athletic	H	3–2	6,012	O'Connor, Easton, Miller
28 November 2000	Kilmarnock	H	0–1	5,497	
5 December 2000	St Mirren	A	1–1	4,685	Naveda
17 December 2000	Rangers	H	1–1	10,750	Lilley
23 December 2000	Heart of Midlothian	A	1–3	12,128	Aljofree
26 December 2000	Celtic	H	0–4	12,306	
30 December 2000	Hibernian	A	0–1	10,197	
2 January 2001	Motherwell	H	2–0	6,311	Easton, Hamilton
31 January 2001	Dundee	A	3–2	11,724	Davidson, Easton, Lauchlan
3 February 2001	St Johnstone	H	1–1	6,482	Miller
10 February 2001	Dunfermline Athletic	A	1–3	5,180	Lilley
24 February 2001	Kilmarnock	A	0–0	6,227	
3 March 2001	St Mirren	H	4–0	8,334	Miller, Hannah, Lilley, Hamilton
17 March 2001	Aberdeen	H	1–1	8,472	Miller
31 March 2001	Rangers	A	2–0	48,382	Thompson, Lilley
4 April 2001	Aberdeen	A	1–4	9,962	Griffin
7 April 2001	Heart of Midlothian	H	1–1	7,242	Thompson
23 April 2001	St Mirren	A	1–2	6,473	Thompson
28 April 2001	Motherwell	H	1–0	5,928	Buchan
6 May 2001	Dunfermline Athletic	H	1–0	6,679	Thompson
12 May 2001	St Johnstone	A	3–2	6,748	Miller, Easton, Lilley
20 May 2001	Aberdeen	A	2–1	11,633	Venetis, Lilley

=== Scottish Cup ===
Date	Round	Opponent	Venue	Result	Attendance	Scorers
27 January 2001	Third round	Montrose	A	2–0	2,592	Lauchlan (2)
17 February 2001	Fourth round	Motherwell	A	2–0	6,186	Miller, Easton
11 March 2001	Quarter–finals	Rangers	H	1–0	11,793	Hannah
15 April 2001	Semi–finals	Celtic	N	1–3	38,699	

=== Scottish League Cup ===
Date	Round	Opponent	Venue	Result	Attendance	Scorers
22 August 2000	Second round	Alloa Athletic	A	3–0	1,088	McConalogue (3)
5 September 2000	Third round	Airdrieonians	A	0-0	5,018	
31 October 2000	Quarter–finals	Rangers	A	0–2	30,966	

United beat Airdrieonians 4–3 on penalties

== Player statistics ==
During the 2000–01 season, United used 41 different players, with a further two named as substitutes who did not make an appearance on the pitch. The table below shows the number of appearances and goals scored by each player.

No.	Pos	Nat	Player	Total		SPL		Scottish Cup		League Cup	
No.	Pos	Nat	Player	Apps	Goals	Apps	Goals	Apps	Goals	Apps	Goals
1	GK	(Scotland) SCO	Alan Combe	26	0	23	0	0	0	3	0
2	DF	(Scotland) SCO	John McQuillan	18	0	12+3	0	0	0	2+1	0
3	DF	(Scotland) SCO	Stephen Wright	7	0	5	0	0	0	2	0
4	MF	(Scotland) SCO	David Hannah	28	3	19+4	2	3	1	1+1	0
5	DF	(Canada) CAN	Jason de Vos	40	0	33	0	4	0	2+1	0
6	MF	(Senegal) SEN	Joachim Fernandez	7	0	6	0	0	0	0+1	0
7	MF	(Scotland) SCO	Craig Easton	39	6	28+6	5	4	1	1	0
8	MF	(Greece) GRE	Anastasios Venetis	15	1	3+11	1	0	0	1	0
9	FW	(Scotland) SCO	Alex Mathie	5	0	3+1	0	0	0	1	0
9	FW	(Argentina) ARG	Gustavo Fuentes	3	0	3	0	0	0	0	0
9	FW	(Argentina) ARG	Beto Naveda	14	2	7+6	2	0+1	0	0	0
10	FW	(Cameroon) CMR	Alphonse Tchami	4	0	3	0	0	0	1	0
10	FW	(Scotland) SCO	Derek Lilley	22	7	18	6	4	1	0	0
11	MF	(England) ENG	Neil Heaney	14	0	7+5	0	0+1	0	1	0
12	MF	(France) FRA	Stéphane Léoni	7	0	5+1	0	0	0	0+1	0
12	FW	(England) ENG	Paul Robinson	6	0	2+4	0	0	0	0	0
13	GK	(Scotland) SCO	Paul Gallacher	19	0	15	0	4	0	0	0
14	DF	(England) ENG	Hasney Aljofree	31	2	24+2	2	2	0	3	0
15	FW	(Cameroon) CMR	Mvondo Atangana	12	0	8+3	0	0	0	0+1	0
16	MF	(Northern Ireland) NIR	Danny Griffin	22	1	18	1	4	0	0	0
17	FW	(Scotland) SCO	Jim Hamilton	24	2	14+6	2	3	0	1	0
18	MF	(Scotland) SCO	Jim Paterson	7	1	5+1	1	0	0	1	0
19	FW	(Scotland) SCO	Steven Thompson	37	4	18+13	4	1+3	0	1+1	0
20	DF	(Republic of Ireland) IRL	David Worrell	0	0	0	0	0	0	0	0
21	DF	(Wales) WAL	David Partridge	24	0	17+2	0	1+1	0	3	0
22	GK	(Canada) CAN	Pat Onstad	0	0	0	0	0	0	0	0
23	MF	(Argentina) ARG	Marcelino Galoppo	2	0	2	0	0	0	0	0
23	DF	(Scotland) SCO	Jim Lauchlan	28	3	23	1	4	2	1	0
24	MF	(Scotland) SCO	Jamie Buchan	41	1	33+2	1	2+1	0	3	0
25	FW	(Scotland) SCO	Stephen McConalogue	14	4	3+8	1	0	0	2+1	3
26	MF	(Scotland) SCO	Hugh Davidson	12	1	6+5	1	0	0	1	0
27	DF	(Scotland) SCO	Tony Smith	5	0	1+2	0	0+1	0	0+1	0
28	DF	(France) FRA	John Licina	8	0	5+2	0	0	0	1	0
29	MF	(Uruguay) URU	Carlos Marcora	1	0	0+1	0	0	0	0	0
30	MF	(Honduras) HON	Francisco Ramírez	1	0	0+1	0	0	0	0	0
30	MF	(Scotland) SCO	Jamie Fullarton	5	0	3+2	0	0	0	0	0
31	FW	(England) ENG	Sean O'Connor	2	1	1+1	1	0	0	0	0
32	DF	(Scotland) SCO	David McCracken	9	1	6+3	1	0	0	0	0
33	MF	(Scotland) SCO	Charlie Miller	28	6	24	5	4	1	0	0
35	MF	(Scotland) SCO	Kevin McDonald	2	0	0+1	0	0	0	1	0
36	MF	(Scotland) SCO	Darren Brady	1	0	0+1	0	0	0	0	0
42	DF	(Scotland) SCO	Jamie McCunnie	19	0	15	0	4	0	0	0
44	FW	(Scotland) SCO	David Winters	5	0	0+5	0	0	0	0	0

=== Goalscorers ===
Seventeen players scored for the United first team with the team scoring 46 goals in total. Derek Lilley was the top goalscorer, scoring seven goals.

Name	League	Cups	Total
Derek Lilley	6	1	7
Craig Easton	5	1	6
Charlie Miller	5	1	6
Steven Thompson	4		4
Stephen McConalogue	1	3	4
David Hannah	2	1	3
Jim Lauchlan	1	2	3
Hasney Aljofree	2		2
Jim Hamilton	2		2
Beto Naveda	2		2
Jamie Buchan	1		1
Hugh Davidson	1		1
Danny Griffin	1		1
David McCracken	1		1
Sean O'Connor	1		1
Jim Paterson	1		1
Anastasios Venetis	1		1

=== Discipline ===
During the 2000–01 season, six United players were sent off, and 24 players received at least one yellow card. In total, the team received seven dismissals and 79 cautions.

Name	Cautions	Dismissals
Craig Easton	(yellow card) 5	(red card) 2
David Partridge	(yellow card) 7	(red card) 1
Jason de Vos	(yellow card) 7	(red card) 1
Jim Lauchlan	(yellow card) 6	(red card) 1
Derek Lilley	(yellow card) 4	(red card) 1
Stephen Wright		(red card) 1
David Hannah	(yellow card) 8	
Charlie Miller	(yellow card) 8	
Hasney Aljofree	(yellow card) 6	
John Licina	(yellow card) 4	
Steven Thompson	(yellow card) 4	
Jamie Buchan	(yellow card) 3	
Jim Hamilton	(yellow card) 2	
Neil Heaney	(yellow card) 2	
Jim Paterson	(yellow card) 2	
Alphonse Tchami	(yellow card) 2	
Alan Combe	(yellow card) 1	
Hugh Davidson	(yellow card) 1	
Joachim Fernandez	(yellow card) 1	
Stephen McConalogue	(yellow card) 1	
Jamie McCunnie	(yellow card) 1	
Kevin McDonald	(yellow card) 1	
John McQuillan	(yellow card) 1	
Beto Naveda	(yellow card) 1	
Anastasios Venetis	(yellow card) 1	

== Team statistics ==
=== League table ===
Pos	Team	Pld	W	D	L	GF	GA	GD	Pts	Qualification or relegation (Note: Teams played each other three times (33 matches), before the league split into two groups (the top six and the bottom six) for the last five matches.)
8	Motherwell	38	12	7	19	42	56	−14	43	
9	Dunfermline Athletic	38	11	9	18	34	54	−20	42	
10	St Johnstone	38	9	13	16	40	56	−16	40	
11	Dundee United	38	9	8	21	38	63	−25	35	
12	St Mirren (R)	38	8	6	24	32	72	−40	30	Relegation to the First Division

Source: Scottish Professional Football League
Rules for classification: 1) Points; 2) Goal difference; 3) Goals scored
(R) Relegated

== Transfers ==
=== In ===
Date	Player	From	Fee (£)
25 July 2000	(England) Neil Heaney	(England) Darlington	£175,000
21 August 2000	(Scotland) Stephen Wright	(England) Bradford City	Nominal
25 August 2000	(Cameroon) Alphonse Tchami	(United Arab Emirates) Al Wasl	Free
22 September 2000	(Honduras) Reynaldo Clavasquín	(Honduras) Motagua	Unknown
22 September 2000	(Honduras) Francisco Ramírez	(Honduras) Motagua	Unknown
22 September 2000	(Argentina) Gustavo Fuentes	(Honduras) Motagua	Unknown
30 September 2000	(Argentina) Marcelino Galoppo	(Italy) Sanremese	Free
30 September 2000	(Uruguay) Carlos Marcora	(Honduras) Real España	Free
27 October 2000	(Scotland) Jim Lauchlan	(Scotland) Kilmarnock	£100,000
3 November 2000	(Scotland) Charlie Miller	(England) Watford	Free
3 November 2000	(Argentina) Beto Naveda	(Israel) Hapoel Jerusalem	Free
10 November 2000	(Scotland) Jamie Fullarton	(England) Crystal Palace	Free
14 December 2000	(Scotland) Derek Lilley	(England) Oxford United	£80,000
25 January 2001	(Spain) Raúl Sánchez	(Spain) Barcelona	Free
30 March 2001	(Scotland) Darren Brady	(Scotland) Airdrieonians	Free
30 March 2001	(Scotland) David McGuire	(Scotland) Airdrieonians	Free

=== Out ===
Date	Player	To	Fee
1 September 2000	(Scotland) Scott McCulloch	(Wales) Cardiff City	£100,000
25 September 2000	(Scotland) Alex Mathie	(England) York City	Free
25 October 2000	(Honduras) Reynaldo Clavasquín	(Austria) BSV Bad Bleiberg	Free
25 October 2000	(Argentina) Marcelino Galoppo	(Italy) Sanremese	Free
25 October 2000	(Uruguay) Carlos Marcora	(Honduras) Real España	Free
25 October 2000	(Honduras) Francisco Ramírez	(Honduras) Platense	Free
31 October 2000	(Argentina) Gustavo Fuentes	(Honduras) Olimpia	Free
6 December 2000	(France) Stéphane Léoni	(France) Sedan	Free
6 December 2000	(Cameroon) Alphonse Tchami	(France) Nice	Free
7 December 2000	(Northern Ireland) Darren Patterson	(England) York City	Free
12 December 2000	(Senegal) Joachim Fernandez	(Indonesia) Persma Manado	Free
23 January 2001	(Republic of Ireland) David Worrell	(England) Plymouth Argyle	Nominal
21 March 2001	(Canada) Pat Onstad	(United States) Rochester Rhinos	Free
3 April 2001	(Spain) Raúl Sánchez	Unknown	Free
20 May 2001	(Scotland) Darren Brady	(Scotland) Livingston	Free
20 May 2001	(Scotland) David McGuire	(Scotland) Livingston	Free

=== Loans in ===
Date	Player	To	Until
1 October 2000	(England) Paul Robinson	(England) Wimbledon	3 May 2001

=== Loans out ===
Date	Player	To	Until
20 November 2000	(Republic of Ireland) David Worrell	(England) Plymouth Argyle	20 January 2001
4 January 2001	(Scotland) Stephen McConalogue	(Scotland) Greenock Morton	2 March 2001
4 January 2001	(Scotland) David Winters	(Scotland) Forfar Athletic	10 February 2001
5 January 2001	(Scotland) Kevin McDonald	(Scotland) Greenock Morton	31 January 2001
15 January 2001	(England) Sean O'Connor	(Northern Ireland) Portadown	6 May 2001
28 February 2001	(Scotland) John McQuillan	(Scotland) Alloa Athletic	6 May 2001

== See also ==
- 2000–01 Scottish Premier League
- 2000–01 Scottish Cup
- 2000–01 in Scottish football
