= 1992–93 Aberdeen F.C. season =

Aberdeen
1992–93 season
- Chairman: Dick Donald
- Manager: Willie Miller
- Stadium: Pittodrie Stadium
- Scottish Premier Division: 2nd place
- Scottish Cup: Runners-up
- Scottish League Cup: Runners-up
- Top goalscorer: League: Duncan Shearer (22); All: Duncan Shearer (27)
- Highest home attendance: 15,055 vs. Rangers, 22 February 1993
- Lowest home attendance: 7,727 vs. St Johnstone, 8 May 1993
- Average home league attendance: 11,176

Aberdeen F.C. competed in the Scottish Premier Division, Scottish Cup and Scottish League Cup in the 1992–93 season. The club led by Willie Miller in his first full season as manager finished second in the league and lost to Rangers in both cup finals. It was also the first time since season 1976–77 that the Dons had not played in European competition after finishing 6th in the league the previous season.

== Results ==
=== Scottish Premier Division ===
Match Day	Date	Opponent	H/A	Score	Aberdeen Scorer(s)	Attendance
1	1 August	Hibernian	H	3–0	Shearer (2), Booth	12,503
2	5 August	Celtic	H	1–1	Shearer	14,618
3	8 August	Falkirk	A	1–0	Aitken	5,925
4	15 August	Motherwell	A	1–2	Jess	5,561
5	22 August	Dundee	H	2–1	Shearer, Paatelainen	11,604
6	29 August	Rangers	A	1–3	Aitken	41,636
7	2 September	Airdrieonians	H	0–0		9,021
8	12 September	Heart of Midlothian	A	0–1		10,630
9	19 September	Partick Thistle	H	2–0	Grant, Paatelainen,	9,755
10	26 September	St Johnstone	A	3–0	Shearer (2), Paatelainen	7,320
11	3 October	Dundee United	H	0–1		12,936
12	7 October	Hibernian	A	3–1	Jess (2), Shearer	8,824
13	17 October	Falkirk	H	3–1	Jess, Paatelainen, Booth	9,016
14	31 October	Airdrieonians	A	2–1	Sandison (Own Goal), Shearer	3,221
15	7 November	Dundee	A	2–1	Shearer, Richardson	6,902
16	11 November	Motherwell	H	2–0	Shearer, Grant	8,725
17	24 November	Partick Thistle	A	7–0	Shearer (3), Booth, Jess, Kane, Mason	3,986
18	28 November	Heart of Midlothian	H	6–2	Shearer (3), Irvine, Mason, Booth	13,555
19	2 December	Celtic	A	2–2	Jess, Kane	29,122
20	5 December	St Johnstone	H	3–0	Kane, Roddie, Mason	11,750
21	12 December	Dundee United	A	2–2	Irvine, Jess	10,394
22	19 December	Hibernian	H	2–0	Richardson, Booth	11,018
23	26 December	Motherwell	A	2–0	Irvine, Jess	7,907
24	2 January	Dundee	H	0–0		13,201
25	16 January	Airdrieonians	H	7–0	Paatelainen (4), Jess, Booth, Irvine	8,805
26	30 January	Falkirk	A	4–1	Jess (2), Booth, Shearer	6,886
27	2 February	Rangers	H	0–1		15,055
28	13 February	Celtic	H	1–1	Paatelainen	14,673
29	20 February	St Johnstone	A	2–0	Jess, Booth	6,176
30	24 February	Dundee United	H	0–0		12,603
31	2 March	Partick Thistle	H	1–0	Paatelainen	8,287
32	9 March	Hibernian	A	2–1	Kane, Paatelainen	7,029
33	13 March	Falkirk	H	2–2	Roddie, Shearer	9,095
34	20 March	Dundee	A	2–1	Paatelainen, Booth	5,783
35	27 March	Motherwell	H	1–0	Booth	9,155
36	30 March	Rangers	A	0–2		44,570
37	10 April	Airdrieonians	A	1–1	Shearer	3,005
38	17 April	Heart of Midlothian	H	3–2	Shearer, Paatelainen, Mason	9,700
39	20 April	Partick Thistle	A	3–1	Paatelainen (2), Kane	3,445
40	1 May	Celtic	A	0–1		20,642
41	5 May	Heart of Midlothian	A	2–1	Paatelainen, Shearer	6,038
42	8 May	St Johnstone	H	1–1	Booth	7,727
43	12 May	Rangers	H	1–0	Shearer	13,079
44	15 May	Dundee United	A	4–1	Booth (2), Grant, Gibson	9,078

==== Final standings ====
Pos	Team	Pld	W	D	L	GF	GA	GD	Pts	Qualification or relegation
1	Rangers (C)	44	33	7	4	97	35	+62	73	Qualification for the Champions League first round
2	Aberdeen	44	27	10	7	87	36	+51	64	Qualification for the Cup Winners' Cup first round
3	Celtic	44	24	12	8	68	41	+27	60	Qualification for the UEFA Cup first round
4	Dundee United	44	19	9	16	56	49	+7	47	Qualification for the UEFA Cup first round
5	Heart of Midlothian	44	15	14	15	46	51	−5	44	Qualification for the UEFA Cup first round

Source: RSSSF
Rules for classification: 1) points; 2) goal difference; 3) number of goals scored.
(C) Champions

=== Scottish League Cup ===
Round	Date	Opponent	H/A	Score	Aberdeen Scorer(s)	Attendance
R2	12 August	Arbroath	A	4–0	Paatelainen (2), Shearer, Jess	4,130
R3	19 August	Dunfermline Athletic	H	1–0	Paatelainen	10,791
QF	26 August	Falkirk	A	4–1	Shearer (3), Irvine	8,022
SF	23 September	Celtic	N	1–0	Jess	40,618
Final	25 October	Rangers	N	1–2	Shearer	45,298

=== Scottish Cup ===
Round	Date	Opponent	H/A	Score	Aberdeen Scorer(s)	Attendance
R3	9 January	Hamilton	H	4–1	Booth (3), Irvine	10,800
R4	7 February	Dundee United	H	2–0	Jess (2)	14,500
QF	6 March	Clydebank	H	1–1	Shearer	11,300
QF Replay	16 March	Clydebank	A	4–3	Booth (2), Irvine, Paatelainen	8,000
SF	3 April	Hibernian	N	1–0	Booth	21,413
Final	29 May	Rangers	N	1–2	Richardson	50,715

== Squad ==
=== Appearances & Goals ===
No.	Pos	Nat	Player	Total		Premier Division		Scottish Cup		League Cup	
No.	Pos	Nat	Player	Apps	Goals	Apps	Goals	Apps	Goals	Apps	Goals
	GK	(Netherlands) NED	Theo Snelders	52	0	41	0	6	0	5	0
	GK	(Scotland) SCO	Michael Watt	3	0	3	0	0	0	0	0
	DF	(Scotland) SCO	Gary Smith	50	0	40	0	5	0	5	0
	DF	(Scotland) SCO	Brian Irvine	48	8	39	5	6	2	3	1
	DF	(Scotland) SCO	Stephen Wright	46	0	36	0	5	0	5	0
	DF	(Scotland) SCO	Alex McLeish (c)	35	0	27	0	6	0	2	0
	DF	(Scotland) SCO	David Winnie	26	0	21	0	1	0	4	0
	DF	(Scotland) SCO	Stewart McKimmie	20	0	14	0	3	0	3	0
	DF	(Scotland) SCO	Graeme Ferguson	1	0	1	0	0	0	0	0
	DF	(Scotland) SCO	Gregg Watson	0	0	0	0	0	0	0	0
	DF	(Scotland) SCO	John Milne	0	0	0	0	0	0	0	0
	MF	(England) ENG	Paul Mason	47	4	39	4	4	0	4	0
	MF	(Scotland) SCO	Eoin Jess	40	16	31	12	4	2	5	2
	MF	(Scotland) SCO	Brian Grant	36	3	29	3	5	0	2	0
	MF	(England) ENG	Lee Richardson	36	3	29	2	5	1	2	0
	MF	(Scotland) SCO	Roy Aitken	35	2	26	2	4	0	5	0
	MF	(Scotland) SCO	Paul Kane	30	4	27	4	2	0	1	0
	MF	(Scotland) SCO	Jim Bett	22	0	17	0	1	0	4	0
	MF	(Netherlands) NED	Theo Ten Caat	18	0	15	0	3	0	0	0
	MF	(Scotland) SCO	Andy Roddie	11	2	11	2	0	0	0	0
	MF	(Scotland) SCO	Robert Connor	6	0	6	0	0	0	0	0
	MF	(Scotland) SCO	Ian Cameron	0	0	0	0	0	0	0	0
	MF	(Scotland) SCO	Graham Watson	0	0	0	0	0	0	0	0
	MF	(Scotland) SCO	Colin MacRonald	0	0	0	0	0	0	0	0
	FW	(Scotland) SCO	Duncan Shearer	43	27	34	21	4	1	5	5
	FW	(Finland) FIN	Mixu Paatelainen	43	20	33	16	6	1	4	3
	FW	(Scotland) SCO	Scott Booth	36	19	29	13	6	6	1	0
	FW	(Scotland) SCO	Scott Thomson	5	0	2	0	0	0	3	0
	FW	(Scotland) SCO	Andrew Gibson	1	1	1	1	0	0	0	0
