= 2001–02 Dundee United F.C. season =

Dundee United
2001–02 season
- Chairman: Jim McLean
- Manager: Alex Smith
- Stadium: Tannadice Park
- SPL: Eighth place
- Scottish Cup: Quarter-finals
- League Cup: Quarter-finals
- Top goalscorer: League: Derek Lilley; Jim McIntyre; Steven Thompson (6); All: Steven Thompson (10)
- Highest home attendance: 13,327 vs. Dundee, SPL, 28 July 2001
- Lowest home attendance: 3,702 vs. Dumbarton, League Cup, 25 September 2001
Home colours	Away colours

The 2001–02 season was the 93rd year of football played by Dundee United, and covers the period from 1 July 2001 to 30 June 2002. United finished the season in eighth place.

== Summary ==
Dundee United played a total of 45 competitive matches during the 2001–02 season. The team finished eighth in the Scottish Premier League.

In the cup competitions, United were knocked out of the League Cup at the quarter-finals stage, losing to Hibernian. Ayr United knocked United out of the Scottish Cup at the same stage. Both matches finished 2–0, although Ayr United won in a replay after a 2–2 draw.

Three players were signed during the 2001–02 season, with a total (public) transfer cost of around £150,000. One player was also signed for the following season. In addition, one player was signed on loan. Ten players left the club during the season with only one transfer – Sean O'Connor to Queen of the South – bringing in a fee of £10k. Six players were also loaned out during the season.

Jim Hamilton became the first player in Scottish football to successfully use video evidence to overturn a sending off. Hamilton received a red card against St Johnstone on 16 November but had it rescinded a week later.

Alex Smith would pick up the manager of the month award for February 2002, while Stuart Duff would win the Young player of the month award for April.

The club's playing kits were sponsored by Telewest for the penultimate time.

== Results and fixtures ==
All results are written with Dundee United's score first.

=== Scottish Premier league ===
Date	Opponent	Venue	Result	Attendance	Scorers
28 July 2001	Dundee	H	2–2	13,327	Miller, Hamilton
4 August 2001	Motherwell	A	0–0	5,057	
11 August 2001	St Johnstone	A	1–0	5,156	
18 August 2001	Dunfermline Athletic	H	3–2	13,327	McIntyre, Lilley, Hamilton
26 August 2001	Kilmarnock	H	0–2	7,404	
8 September 2001	Livingston	A	0–2	6,107	
15 September 2001	Aberdeen	A	1–2	12,948	McIntyre
22 September 2001	Rangers	H	1–6	11,117	McIntyre
29 September 2001	Heart of Midlothian	A	2–1	12,948	McIntyre, Thompson
13 October 2001	Hibernian	H	3–1	7,950	Hamilton (2), Griffin
20 October 2001	Celtic	A	1–5	59,900	McIntyre
27 October 2001	Motherwell	H	1–1	6,343	Easton
3 November 2001	Dundee	A	1–1	11,751	Miller
10 November 2001	Dunfermline Athletic	H	0–2	6,214	
17 November 2001	St Johnstone	H	2–1	6,624	Aljofree, Hamilton
24 November 2001	Dunfermline Athletic	A	1–1	4,891	McConalogue
1 December 2001	Kilmarnock	A	0–2	6,130	
8 December 2001	Livingston	H	0–0	6,312	
15 December 2001	Aberdeen	H	1–1	9,129	Easton
22 December 2001	Rangers	A	2–3	11,117	Thompson (2)
26 December 2001	Heart of Midlothian	H	0–2	8,762	
29 December 2001	Celtic	H	0–4	12,165	
2 January 2002	Hibernian	A	1–0	11,155	Paterson
12 January 2002	Motherwell	A	0–2	4,631	
19 January 2002	Dundee	H	1–0	12,851	McIntyre
22 January 2002	St Johnstone	A	4–1	3,711	Lilley (3), Miller
2 February 2002	Kilmarnock	H	0–2	5,774	
9 February 2002	Livingston	A	1–1	4,720	Lilley
16 February 2002	Aberdeen	A	0–4	13,612	
3 March 2002	Rangers	H	0–1	9,386	
9 March 2002	Heart of Midlothian	A	2–1	10,893	Aljofree, Miller
16 March 2002	Celtic	A	0–1	58,392	
23 March 2002	Hibernian	H	1–2	5,801	Thompson
7 April 2002	Hibernian	H	2–1	5,417	Venetis, Lilley
13 April 2002	Motherwell	H	1–0	5,108	Thompson
20 April 2002	Dundee	A	1–0	10,087	Own goal
27 April 2002	St Johnstone	H	0–0	5,190	
12 May 2002	Kilmarnock	A	2–2	6,142	Thompson, Easton

=== Scottish Cup ===
Date	Round	Opponent	Venue	Result	Attendance	Scorers
5 January 2002	Third round	Forres Mechanics	H	3–0	5,904	Aljofree (2), Miller
5 February 2002	Fourth round	Hamilton Academical	H	4–0	4,999	Winters, Thompson (2), Aljofree
23 February 2002	Quarter–finals	Ayr United	H	2–2	5,584	Winters, Easton
6 March 2002	Quarter–final replay	Ayr United	A	0–2	4,445	

=== Scottish League Cup ===
Date	Round	Opponent	Venue	Result	Attendance	Scorers
25 September 2001	Second round	Dumbarton	H	3–0	3,702	Thompson, Easton, Griffin
9 October 2001	Third round	St Johnstone	H	3–2	5,851	Thompson, Hamilton, Paterson
27 November 2001	Quarter–finals	Hibernian	A	0–2	8,825	

United beat St Johnstone after extra time

== Player statistics ==
During the 2001–02 season, United used 29 different players, with a further two named as substitutes who did not make an appearance on the pitch. The table below shows the number of appearances and goals scored by each player.

No.	Pos	Nat	Player	Total		SPL		Scottish Cup		League Cup	
No.	Pos	Nat	Player	Apps	Goals	Apps	Goals	Apps	Goals	Apps	Goals
2	MF	(Republic of Ireland) IRL	Ronnie O'Brien	9	0	8	0	0	0	1	0
3	DF	(Scotland) SCO	Stephen Wright	11	0	9	0	2	0	0	0
4	MF	(Scotland) SCO	David Hannah	22	0	20	0	1	0	1	0
6	DF	(Scotland) SCO	Jim Lauchlan	40	0	33	0	4	0	3	0
7	MF	(Scotland) SCO	Craig Easton	43	5	36	3	4	1	3	1
8	MF	(Scotland) SCO	Charlie Miller	28	6	24	5	4	1	0	0
9	FW	(Scotland) SCO	Derek Lilley	31	6	26	6	4	0	1	0
10	MF	(Scotland) SCO	Jamie Fullarton	15	0	11	0	3	0	1	0
11	MF	(Scotland) SCO	Jim Paterson	32	2	28	1	1	0	3	1
12	DF	(Scotland) SCO	Jamie McCunnie	34	0	28	0	4	0	2	0
13	GK	(Scotland) SCO	Paul Gallacher	45	0	38	0	4	0	3	0
14	DF	(England) ENG	Hasney Aljofree	34	5	27	2	4	3	3	0
15	MF	(Scotland) SCO	Jamie Buchan	7	0	7	0	0	0	0	0
16	DF	(Northern Ireland) NIR	Danny Griffin	34	3	29	2	2	0	3	1
17	FW	(Scotland) SCO	Jim Hamilton	28	6	24	5	1	0	3	1
18	MF	(Greece) GRE	Anastasios Venetis	26	1	24	1	1	0	1	0
19	FW	(Scotland) SCO	Steven Thompson	37	10	31	6	3	2	3	2
21	DF	(Wales) WAL	David Partridge	14	0	13	0	0	0	1	0
22	FW	(Scotland) SCO	Jim McIntyre	23	6	19	6	2	0	2	0
23	FW	(Scotland) SCO	David Winters	16	2	13	0	3	2	0	0
24	DF	(Scotland) SCO	David McCracken	24	0	19	0	2	0	3	0
25	FW	(Scotland) SCO	Stephen McConalogue	14	1	12	1	1	0	1	0
27	MF	(Northern Ireland) NIR	Stephen Carson	18	0	13	0	4	0	1	0
32	DF	(Scotland) SCO	Marc Cocozza	2	0	2	0	0	0	0	0
33	GK	(Scotland) SCO	Paul Jarvie	1	0	1	0	0	0	0	0
36	MF	(Scotland) SCO	Stuart Duff	9	0	9	0	0	0	0	0
39	DF	(Scotland) SCO	Mark Wilson	2	0	1	0	1	0	0	0
40	MF	(Scotland) SCO	Stephen O'Donnell	6	0	6	0	0	0	0	0
43	FW	(Nigeria) NGR	Daniel Ogunmade	2	0	2	0	0	0	0	0

=== Goalscorers ===
Twelve players scored for the United first team with the team scoring 53 goals in total. Steven Thompson was the top goalscorer, scoring ten goals.

Name	League	Cups	Total
Steven Thompson	6	4	10
Derek Lilley	6	0	6
Jim McIntyre	6	0	6
Jim Hamilton	5	1	6
Charlie Miller	4	1	5
Craig Easton	3	2	5
Hasney Aljofree	2	3	5
Danny Griffin	2	1	3
Jim Paterson	1	1	2
David Winters	0	2	2
Stephen McConalogue	1	0	1
Anastasios Venetis	1		1

=== Discipline ===
During the 2001–02 season, five United players were sent off, and 17 players received at least one yellow card. In total, the team received five dismissals and 68 cautions.

Name	Cautions	Dismissals
Charlie Miller	(yellow card) 10	(red card) 1
Jim Lauchlan	(yellow card) 6	(red card) 1
Derek Lilley	(yellow card) 6	(red card) 1
Jamie Fullarton	(yellow card) 4	(red card) 1
Jamie McCunnie	(yellow card) 4	(red card) 1
Hasney Aljofree	(yellow card) 8	
Steven Thompson	(yellow card) 5	
Craig Easton	(yellow card) 4	
Danny Griffin	(yellow card) 4	
Jim McIntyre	(yellow card) 4	
David Partridge	(yellow card) 4	
Jim Hamilton	(yellow card) 2	
David McCracken	(yellow card) 2	
Anastasios Venetis	(yellow card) 2	
David Hannah	(yellow card) 1	
Stephen McConalogue	(yellow card) 1	
Stephen O'Donnell	(yellow card) 1	

== Competitions ==
=== League table ===
Pos	Team	Pld	W	D	L	GF	GA	GD	Pts	Qualification or relegation (Note: Teams played each other three times (33 matches), before the league split into two groups (the top six and the bottom six) for the last five matches.)
6	Dunfermline Athletic	38	12	9	17	41	64	−23	45	
7	Kilmarnock	38	13	10	15	44	54	−10	49	
8	Dundee United	38	12	10	16	38	59	−21	46	
9	Dundee	38	12	8	18	41	55	−14	44	
10	Hibernian	38	10	11	17	51	56	−5	41	

Source: Scottish Professional Football League
Rules for classification: (1) Points; (2) Goal difference; (3) Goals scored

== Transfers ==
=== In ===
Date	Player	From	Fee
3 July 2001	(Scotland) Jim McIntyre	(England) Reading	Free
6 August 2001	(Northern Ireland) Stephen Carson	(Scotland) Rangers	£150,000
9 November 2001	(Scotland) Marc Cocozza	(Scotland) Celtic	Free
18 June 2002	(Scotland) Allan Smart	(England) Oldham Athletic	Free

=== Out ===
Date	Player	To	Fee
26 July 2001	(Scotland) Tony Smith	(Scotland) Airdrieonians	Free
30 July 2001	(Canada) Jason de Vos	(England) Wigan Athletic	Free
4 December 2001	(England) Neil Heaney	(England) Plymouth Argyle	Free
7 February 2002	(Scotland) John McQuillan	(Scotland) Montrose	Free
6 March 2002	(England) Jamie Buchan	(Scotland) Partick Thistle	Free
14 March 2002	(England) Sean O'Connor	(Scotland) Morton	£10,000
15 March 2002	(Scotland) David Hannah	(Cyprus) AEL Limassol	Free
27 March 2002	(Scotland) Jamie Fullarton	(England) Brentford	Free
5 April 2002	(Cameroon) Mvondo Atangana	(England) Colchester United	Free
24 April 2002	(Scotland) Marc Cocozza	(Scotland) Forfar Athletic	Free

=== Loans in ===
Date	Player	From	Until
23 August 2001	(Republic of Ireland) Ronnie O'Brien	(Italy) Juventus	End of season

=== Loans out ===
Date	Player	From	Until
3 August 2001	(Scotland) John McQuillan	(Scotland) Montrose	Loan
3 August 2001	(England) Sean O'Connor	(Scotland) Morton	Loan
24 November 2001	(Scotland) Paul Jarvie	(Scotland) Stenhousemuir	Loan
18 January 2002	(Cameroon) Mvondo Atangana	(England) Port Vale	Loan
26 January 2002	(Scotland) Hugh Davidson	(Scotland) Raith Rovers	Loan
1 February 2002	(Scotland) Alan Combe	(England) Bradford City	Loan

== See also ==
- 2001–02 Scottish Premier League
- 2001–02 Scottish Cup
- 2001–02 in Scottish football
