= 1993–94 Aberdeen F.C. season =

Aberdeen
1993–94 season
- Chairman: Dick Donald (until December); Ian Donald (from January)
- Manager: Willie Miller
- Stadium: Pittodrie Stadium
- Scottish Premier Division: 2nd
- Scottish Cup: Semi-finals
- Scottish League Cup: Quarter-finals
- European Cup Winners' Cup: Second round
- Top goalscorer: League: Duncan Shearer (15); All: Duncan Shearer (26)
- Highest home attendance: 21,655 vs. Torino, 3 November 1993
- Lowest home attendance: 7,568 vs. Dundee, 30 April 1994
- Average home league attendance: 12,460

Aberdeen F.C. competed in the Scottish Premier Division, Scottish League Cup, Scottish Cup and European Cup Winners' Cup in season 1993–94.

== Results ==
=== Scottish Premier Division ===
Match Day	Date	Opponent	H/A	Score	Aberdeen Scorer(s)	Attendance
1	7 August	Dundee United	A	1–1	Booth	13,881
2	14 August	Kilmarnock	H	1–0	Kane	11,394
3	21 August	Dundee	A	1–1	Shearer	7,505
4	28 August	St Johnstone	H	0–0		11,682
5	4 September	Celtic	A	1–0	Paatelainen	34,311
6	11 September	Hibernian	A	1–2	Shearer	8,506
7	18 September	Rangers	H	2–0	Shearer, Pressley	19,138
8	25 September	Raith Rovers	H	4–1	Shearer, Jess, Richardson (2)	11,472
9	2 October	Motherwell	A	0–0		8,597
10	5 October	Heart of Midlothian	H	0–0		10,154
11	9 October	Partick Thistle	A	2–3	Paatelainen, Shearer	5,600
12	16 October	Kilmarnock	A	1–1	Paatelainen	9,108
13	23 October	Dundee United	H	2–0	Paatelainen, Shearer	13,566
14	30 October	Dundee	H	1–0	Shearer	11,885
15	6 November	St Johnstone	A	1–1	Booth	5,757
16	9 November	Celtic	H	1–1	Grant	19,474
17	13 November	Motherwell	H	1–1	Booth	12,494
18	27 November	Hibernian	H	4–0	Kane, Connor, Shearer, Grant	12,334
19	1 December	Rangers	A	0–2		45,182
20	4 December	Heart of Midlothian	A	1–1	Shearer	9,402
21	7 December	Raith Rovers	A	1–1	Miller	4,205
22	14 December	Partick Thistle	H	2–1	Irvine, Shearer	8,248
23	18 December	Kilmarnock	H	3–1	Miller, Shearer, Richardson	10,834
24	27 December	Dundee United	A	1–0	Jess	9,292
25	8 January	St Johnstone	H	1–1	Shearer	12,712
26	11 January	Dundee	A	1–0	Irvine	5,219
27	19 January	Celtic	A	2–2	Irvine, Jess	19,083
28	22 January	Rangers	H	0–0		20,267
29	5 February	Hibernian	A	1–3	Richardson	9,556
30	12 February	Raith Rovers	H	4–0	Paatelainen (2), Shearer, Booth	10,553
31	5 March	Hearts	H	0–1		13,059
32	8 March	Motherwell	A	1–1	Shearer	7,018
33	19 March	Kilmarnock	A	3–2	Miller, Shearer, Jess	8,544
34	26 March	Dundee United	H	1–0	Shearer	12,574
35	29 March	Hibernian	H	2–3	Jess, Miller	10,832
36	2 April	Rangers	A	1–1	Kane	45,888
37	5 April	Partick Thistle	A	1–1	Tierney	4,280
38	16 April	Motherwell	H	0–0		9,642
39	23 April	Partick Thistle	H	2–0	Jess, Grant	7,827
40	27 April	Heart of Midlothian	A	1–1	Irvine	13,811
41	30 April	Dundee	H	1–1	Irvine	7,568
42	3 May	Raith Rovers	A	2–0	Roddie, Shearer	2,798
43	7 May	St Johnstone	A	1–0	Irvine	6,107
44	14 May	Celtic	H	1–1	Irvine	16,417

==== Final standings ====
Pos	Team	Pld	W	D	L	GF	GA	GD	Pts	Qualification or relegation
1	Rangers (C)	44	22	14	8	74	41	+33	58	Qualification for the Champions League qualifying round
2	Aberdeen	44	17	21	6	58	36	+22	55	Qualification for the UEFA Cup preliminary round
3	Motherwell	44	20	14	10	58	43	+15	54	Qualification for the UEFA Cup preliminary round
4	Celtic	44	15	20	9	51	38	+13	50	
5	Hibernian	44	16	15	13	53	48	+5	47	

Source: RSSSF
Rules for classification: 1) points; 2) goal difference; 3) number of goals scored.
(C) Champions

=== Scottish League Cup ===
Round	Date	Opponent	H/A	Score	Aberdeen Scorer(s)	Attendance
R2	10 August	Clydebank	H	5–0	Shearer (3), McLeish, Richardson	11,394
R3	24 August	Motherwell	H	5–2	Booth (2), Shearer, Miller, Jess	12,996
QF	24 August	Rangers	A	1–2	Miller	44,928

=== Scottish Cup ===
Round	Date	Opponent	H/A	Score	Aberdeen Scorer(s)	Attendance
R3	8 February	East Stirlingshire	A	3–1	Shearer (2), Craig	3,853
R4	19 February	Raith Rovers	H	3–1	Miller	13,740
QF	12 March	St Johnstone	A	1–1	Booth	8,847
QF R	15 March	St Johnstone	H	2–0	Shearer, Richardson	14,325
SF	9 April	Dundee United	N	1–1	Shearer	21,397
SF R	12 April	Dundee United	N	0–1		13,936

=== European Cup Winners Cup ===
Round	Date	Opponent	H/A	Score	Aberdeen Scorer(s)	Attendance
R1 L1	14 September	(Iceland) Valur	A	3–0	Jess (2), Shearer	656
R1 L2	29 September	(Iceland) Valur	H	4–0	Jess (2), Miller, Irvine	10,004
R2 L1	20 October	(Italy) Torino	A	2–3	Paatelainen, Jess	30,000
R2 L2	3 November	(Italy) Torino	H	1–2	Richardson	21,655

== Squad ==
=== Appearances & Goals ===
No.	Pos	Nat	Player	Total		Premier Division		Scottish Cup		League Cup		Cup Winners' Cup	
No.	Pos	Nat	Player	Apps	Goals	Apps	Goals	Apps	Goals	Apps	Goals	Apps	Goals
	GK	(Netherlands) NED	Theo Snelders	43	0	33	0	3	0	3	0	4	0
	GK	(Scotland) SCO	Derek Stillie	7	0	5	0	2	0	0	0	0	0
	GK	(Scotland) SCO	Michael Watt	4	0	4	0	0	0	0	0	0	0
	GK	(England) ENG	John Burridge	4	0	3	0	1	0	0	0	0	0
	DF	(Scotland) SCO	Brian Irvine	54	8	42	7	6	0	2	0	4	1
	DF	(Scotland) SCO	Stewart McKimmie	51	0	40	0	5	0	2	0	4	0
	DF	(Scotland) SCO	Alex McLeish (c)	45	1	35	0	4	0	3	1	3	0
	DF	(Scotland) SCO	Stephen Wright	44	0	36	0	4	0	1	0	3	0
	DF	(Scotland) SCO	Gary Smith	32	0	21	0	5	0	3	0	3	0
	DF	(Scotland) SCO	Hugh Robertson	10	0	8	0	2	0	0	0	0	0
	DF	(Scotland) SCO	David Winnie	9	0	6	0	1	0	0	0	2	0
	DF	(Scotland) SCO	Neil Cooper	0	0	0	0	0	0	0	0	0	0
	DF	(Scotland) SCO	John Milne	0	0	0	0	0	0	0	0	0	0
	DF	(Trinidad and Tobago) TRI	Rick Titus	0	0	0	0	0	0	0	0	0	0
	MF	(Scotland) SCO	Eoin Jess	54	12	41	6	6	0	3	1	4	5
	MF	(Scotland) SCO	Paul Kane	51	3	39	3	5	0	3	0	4	0
	MF	(England) ENG	Lee Richardson	44	7	35	4	4	1	2	1	3	1
	MF	(Scotland) SCO	Joe Miller	39	8	27	4	6	1	3	2	3	1
	MF	(Scotland) SCO	Brian Grant	36	2	30	2	4	0	0	0	2	0
	MF	(Scotland) SCO	Robert Connor	30	1	25	1	0	0	2	0	3	0
	MF	(Scotland) SCO	Jim Bett	13	0	6	0	2	0	3	0	2	0
	MF	(Scotland) SCO	Ray McKinnon	7	0	5	0	2	0	0	0	0	0
	MF	(Scotland) SCO	Andy Roddie	6	1	6	1	0	0	0	0	0	0
	MF	(Netherlands) NED	Theo Ten Caat	4	0	3	0	0	0	1	0	0	0
	MF	(Scotland) SCO	Roy Aitken	2	0	1	0	0	0	0	0	1	0
	MF	(Scotland) SCO	Kenny Gilbert	0	0	0	0	0	0	0	0	0	0
	MF	(Scotland) SCO	Derek Adams	0	0	0	0	0	0	0	0	0	0
	MF	(Scotland) SCO	Graham Watson	0	0	0	0	0	0	0	0	0	0
	FW	(Scotland) SCO	Duncan Shearer	54	26	43	17	6	4	3	4	2	1
	FW	(Finland) FIN	Mixu Paatelainen	44	7	36	6	3	0	2	0	3	1
	FW	(Scotland) SCO	Scott Booth	34	7	25	4	5	1	3	2	1	0
	FW	(Scotland) SCO	Scott Thomson	3	0	3	0	0	0	0	0	0	0
	FW	(Scotland) SCO	Andrew Gibson	3	0	2	0	0	0	0	0	1	0
	??	(Iran) IRN	Peyvand Mossovot	0	0	0	0	0	0	0	0	0	0
