= 1991–92 Aberdeen F.C. season =

Aberdeen F.C.
1991–92 season
- Chairman: Dick Donald
- Manager: Alex Smith (to February); Jocky Scott (to September); Willie Miller (from February)
- Scottish Premier Division: 6th
- Scottish Cup: Third round
- Scottish League Cup: Third round
- UEFA Cup: First round
- Top goalscorer: League: Eoin Jess (12); All: Eoin Jess (12)
- Highest home attendance: 23,000 vs. Rangers, 22 January 1992
- Lowest home attendance: 6,461 vs. Falkirk, 25 April 1992
- Average home league attendance: 11,799

Aberdeen F.C. competed in the Scottish Premier Division, Scottish Cup, Scottish League Cup and UEFA Cup in the 1991–92 season.

== Overview ==
After the disappointment of losing the league championship on the final day of the previous season, Aberdeen began with four Premier Division victories. The early promise of the season was ended when the Dons lost at home to Airdrieonians in the League Cup. A few weeks later, co-manager Jocky Scott resigned in order to become manager of Dunfermline, leaving Alex Smith as sole manager.

Following Scott's departure, Aberdeen's season rapidly fell apart. In the UEFA Cup, Aberdeen lost at home and away to Danish club Boldklubben 1903 in the first round. A run of seventeen league games which yielded just three victories between November and February cost manager Alex Smith his job as he became the first Aberdeen manager ever to be sacked, with the club dangerously close to the relegation zone. His successor, club legend Willie Miller, managed to revitalise the team and had them in contention for a UEFA Cup spot until the last day of the season, but a loss to league champions Rangers resulted in Aberdeen missing out on European football for the first time in 15 years. In the Scottish Cup, Aberdeen lost at home in the third round to Rangers. Eoin Jess finished as the top scorer with 12 goals. Major signings included Finnish striker Mixu Paatelainen from Dundee United and Theo ten Caat, who became the fifth Dutch player to join the club in recent years.

== Results ==
=== Scottish Premier Division ===
Match Day	Date	Opponent	H/A	Score	Aberdeen Scorer(s)	Attendance
1	10 August	Airdrieonians	A	2–1	Irvine, Gillhaus	6,337
2	14 August	Falkirk	A	1–0	Booth	8,462
3	17 August	Dunfermline Athletic	H	3–0	Grant, Bett, Jess	13,849
4	24 August	Celtic	H	1–0	Gillhaus	20,503
5	31 August	Dundee United	A	0–0		11,961
6	7 September	St Johnstone	H	1–2	van de Ven	12,071
7	14 September	Motherwell	A	1–0	Gillhaus	6,452
8	21 September	Hibernian	H	1–1	Grant	11,850
9	28 September	Rangers	A	2–0	Grant, Jess	36,330
10	5 October	St Mirren	H	4–1	Grant, Mason, Irvine, Ten Caat	10,154
11	9 October	Heart of Midlothian	A	0–1		15,569
12	12 October	Airdrieonians	H	3–1	Ten Caat, Jess (2)	8,998
13	18 October	Dunfermline Athletic	A	0–0		5,157
14	26 October	St Johnstone	A	3–1	van de Ven, Jess Mason	5,682
15	30 October	Motherwell	H	3–1	Winnie, Mason, Gillhaus	9,092
16	2 November	Dundee United	H	0–1		13,728
17	9 November	Celtic	A	1–2	Jess	36,837
18	16 November	St Mirren	A	1–0	Own goal	3,634
19	20 November	Heart of Midlothian	H	0–2		15,337
20	23 November	Hibernian	A	0–1		8,942
21	30 November	Falkirk	H	1–1	Gillhaus	10,614
22	4 December	Rangers	H	2–3	Irvine, Ten Caat	20,081
23	7 December	Airdrieonians	A	0–2		3,071
24	14 December	St Johnstone	H	4–1	Grant, Booth, Jess, Roddie	9,292
25	28 December	Celtic	H	2–2	Jess, Ten Caat	20,442
26	1 January	Dundee United	A	0–4		7,777
27	4 January	St Mirren	H	0–0		8,774
28	11 January	Heart of Midlothian	A	4–0	Mason, Booth, Jess (2)	16,291
29	14 January	Motherwell	A	3–3	Kane, Jess, Roddie	5,221
30	18 January	Falkirk	A	2–2	Mason, Booth	5,122
31	1 February	Dunfermline Athletic	H	1–1	Jess	7,549
32	8 February	Hibernian	H	0–1		9,568
33	25 February	Rangers	A	0–0		38,519
34	29 February	St Mirren	A	2–0	Smith, Mason	3,853
35	14 March	Celtic	A	0–1		29,380
36	18 March	Heart of Midlothian	H	2–0	Mason, Ten Caat	10,581
37	21 March	Dundee United	H	0–2		10,350
38	28 March	Airdrieonians	H	1–0	Irvine	6,805
39	4 April	Dunfermline Athletic	A	0–0		3,033
40	8 April	St Johnstone	A	0–0		4,524
41	11 April	Motherwell	H	2–0	Grant, Kane	6,902
42	18 April	Hibernian	A	1–1	Paatelainen	6,777
43	25 April	Falkirk	H	1–1	Booth	6,461
44	2 May	Rangers	H	0–2		16,580

==== Final standings ====
Pos	Team	Pld	W	D	L	GF	GA	GD	Pts	Qualification or relegation
4	Dundee United	44	19	13	12	66	50	+16	51	
5	Hibernian	44	16	17	11	53	45	+8	49	Qualification for the UEFA Cup first round
6	Aberdeen	44	17	14	13	55	42	+13	48	
7	Airdrieonians	44	13	10	21	50	70	−20	36	Qualification for the Cup Winners' Cup first round
8	St Johnstone	44	13	10	21	52	73	−21	36	

Rules for classification: 1) points; 2) goal difference; 3) number of goals scored.

=== Scottish League Cup ===
Round	Date	Opponent	H/A	Score	Aberdeen Scorer(s)	Attendance
R2	21 August	Clyde	A	4–0	Winnie, Grant, van de Ven, Booth	2,107
R3	28 August	Airdrieonians	H	0–1		13,000

=== Scottish Cup ===
Round	Date	Opponent	H/A	Score	Aberdeen Scorer(s)	Attendance
R3	22 January	Rangers	H	0–1		23,000

=== UEFA Cup ===
Round	Date	Opponent	H/A	Score	Aberdeen Scorer(s)	Attendance
R1 L1	18 September	(Denmark) Boldklubben 1903	H	0–1		13,000
R1 L2	2 October	(Denmark) Boldklubben 1903	A	0–2		5,237

== Squad ==
=== Appearances and goals ===
No.	Pos	Nat	Player	Total		Premier Division		Scottish Cup		League Cup		Europe	
No.	Pos	Nat	Player	Apps	Goals	Apps	Goals	Apps	Goals	Apps	Goals	Apps	Goals
	MF	(Scotland) SCO	Jim Bett	43	1	38	1	1	0	2	0	2	0
	FW	(Scotland) SCO	Scott Booth	38	6	33	5	1	0	2	1	2	0
	FW	(Scotland) SCO	Ian Cameron	8	0	6	0	0	0	1	0	1	0
	MF	(Scotland) SCO	Bobby Connor	13	0	11	0	0	0	0	0	2	0
	DF	(Scotland) SCO	Graeme Ferguson	4	0	4	0	0	0	0	0	0	0
	FW	(Scotland) SCO	Andy Gibson	5	0	5	0	0	0	0	0	0	0
	FW	(Netherlands) NED	Hans Gillhaus	33	5	29	5	1	0	2	0	1	0
	MF	(Scotland) SCO	Brian Grant	38	0	33	0	1	0	2	0	2	0
	DF	(Scotland) SCO	Mark Humphries	2	0	2	0	0	0	0	0	0	0
	DF	(Scotland) SCO	Brian Irvine	38	4	33	4	1	0	2	0	2	0
	FW	(Scotland) SCO	Eoin Jess	44	12	39	12	1	0	2	0	2	0
	MF	(Scotland) SCO	Paul Kane	26	0	25	0	1	0	0	0	0	0
	MF	(England) ENG	Paul Mason	32	0	31	0	1	0	0	0	0	0
	DF	(Scotland) SCO	Stewart McKimmie	44	0	39	0	1	0	2	0	2	0
	DF	(Scotland) SCO	Alex McLeish (c)	7	0	7	0	0	0	0	0	0	0
	FW	(Finland) FIN	Mixu Paatelainen	6	1	6	1	0	0	0	0	0	0
	FW	(Scotland) SCO	Andy Roddie	11	2	10	2	1	0	0	0	0	0
	DF	(Scotland) SCO	Gary Smith	16	1	16	1	0	0	0	0	0	0
	GK	(Netherlands) NED	Theo Snelders	47	0	42	0	1	0	2	0	2	0
	FW	(Netherlands) NED	Theo ten Caat	32	5	30	5	0	0	0	0	2	0
	MF	(Netherlands) NED	Peter van de Ven	26	3	23	2	0	0	2	1	1	0
	FW	(Netherlands) NED	Willem van der Ark	22	0	18	0	0	0	2	0	2	0
	DF	(Scotland) SCO	Graham Watson	14	0	11	0	0	0	1	0	2	0
	DF	(Scotland) SCO	Gregg Watson	8	0	8	0	0	0	0	0	0	0
	GK	(Scotland) SCO	Michael Watt	2	0	2	0	0	0	0	0	0	0
	DF	(Scotland) SCO	David Winnie	31	2	28	1	1	0	2	1	0	0
	DF	(Scotland) SCO	Stephen Wright	27	0	23	0	1	0	2	0	1	0
