= Galoppo =

Galoppo is an Italian surname. Notable people with the surname include:

- Giuliano Galoppo (born 1999), Argentine footballer
- Marcelino Galoppo (born 1970), Argentine retired footballer
