= 2004–05 Dundee United F.C. season =

Dundee United
2004–05 season
- Chairman: Eddie Thompson
- Manager: Ian McCall (until 14 March); Gordon Chisholm (Interim) (from 24 May)
- Stadium: Tannadice Park
- SPL: Ninth place
- Scottish Cup: Runners-up
- League Cup: Semi-finals
- Top goalscorer: League: Jim McIntyre (10); All: Jim McIntyre (15)
- Highest home attendance: 12,703 vs. Dundee, SPL, 29 January 2005
- Lowest home attendance: 5,097 vs. Kilmarnock, SPL, 11 December 2004
Home colours	Away colours	Third colours

The 2004–05 season was the 96th year of football played by Dundee United, and covers the period from 1 July 2004 to 30 June 2005. United finished in ninth place which meant the previous season's top-six finish was the only one in the five seasons since the split was introduced.

United finished the 2004–05 SPL season in ninth place with 36 points, in which an eventful final day could have relegated themselves, Livingston or Dunfermline, before eventually consigning Dundee to the drop. United managed only eight wins, with twelve draws and eighteen defeats. Between March and early-April, United lost five consecutive games, although most were to teams who would finish in the top half of the league.

The cup campaigns brought contrasting fortunes. a 7–1 defeat to Rangers in the League Cup semi-final was remedied by a fighting display against Celtic in the Scottish Cup final, where United lost 1–0. Despite having fewer chances, United had more possession and it took a deflected free-kick to give Celtic the win. Defender Alan Archibald struck the bar in the final minute as United pushed for an equaliser.

A strong league finish secured United's top-flight status, with four wins from the final seven games, including victories against Rangers, Hearts and rivals Dundee.

== Summary ==
Dundee United played a total of 47 competitive matches during the 2004–05 season, as well as six pre-season friendlies, making a total of over fifty games played. The team finished ninth in the Scottish Premier League.

In the cup competitions, United were runners-up in the Scottish Cup, losing 1–0 to Celtic, qualifying for the UEFA Cup in the process. The club lost heavily in the Scottish League Cup semi-finals, losing 7–1 to Rangers as Nick Colgan – playing only his second match in his loan spell – played his last game for the club.

The club signed four players during the season, as well as loaning one for the latter part. Only one player – Stevie Crawford – was signed for a fee of £80k. Seven players were released by the club during the season. Four players were also loaned with Andy McLaren going on loan twice to different clubs.

The club's playing kits were sponsored by Morning, Noon and Night for a second season.

Gordon Chisholm would pick up the manager of the month award for April 2005.

Defender Alan Archibald played every minute of the 2004–05 season: United used different goalkeepers for all four League Cup matches: Tony Bullock played in the 3–1 second round win against Stranraer: Lars Hirschfeld played in the 4–0 third round win against Clyde: Paul Jarvie played in the 2–1 quarter-final win against Hibernian: Nick Colgan played in the 7–1 semi-final defeat to Rangers.

== Season review ==
United began pre-season with James Grady as the only pre-season signing, the striker arriving on a Bosman transfer from relegated Partick Thistle. First-team regulars Paul Gallacher and Charlie Miller left by the same method during the summer, with Scotland keeper Gallacher heading for Norwich City and Miller joining Norwegian side SK Brann. Veteran Owen Coyle also cut short his second Tannadice stay to return to Airdrie Utd. During August, Paul Ritchie and goalkeeper Lars Hirschfeld arrived on six-month deals following releases from Walsall and Tottenham respectively. Surprisingly, Grant Brebner was also allowed to sign for free from fellow SPL side Hibernian.

A home defeat to derby rivals Dundee just two games in was not the ideal way to start the season and United managed only one win in August, with a 2–1 home victory over Inverness CT. During August, youngsters Aaron Conway and Karim Kerkar arrived from Clyde in early-September but the month brought little to cheer about, with a CIS Insurance Cup win over Clyde providing the only win.

Into October and the winless streak continued, although a last-minute draw at Rangers brought some optimism. Another derby defeat in early November was tempered firstly by a League Cup quarter-final win over Hibs, then a home league success over Livingston but more defeats followed and only one more win arrived before Christmas, courtesy of a 3–0 triumph at home to Kilmarnock.

United entered New Year with no away wins but finally won on the road, thanks to a 4–3 thriller at Gretna in the Scottish Cup. The third derby match was drawn 2–2 with Steve Lovell's late leveller denying United three points, in a game where Nick Colgan – signed 24 hours previously – was given a debut. February started in dismal fashion, with Colgan's second (and final) match resulting in a 7–1 defeat against Rangers in the CIS Cup semi-final. In a match screened live on BBC Scotland, United rallied from 2–0 down with Jason Scotland scoring, and had Jim McIntyre's long-range strike not hit both posts and ran along the line at 2–1 down, the game might have been different. United did recover by winning three of the remaining four matches that month, albeit two in the Scottish Cup. Queen of the South were beaten first, followed by a first away league win at Livingston and then a 4–1 home rout of Aberdeen in the quarter-final. With the match shown live on Sky Sports, it was a chance for United to gain television revenge for the Hampden horror show just three weeks previously.

Aberdeen were back at Tannadice three days later for a league match and won 2–1, starting a run of four straight defeats in March. After Kilmarnock's 3–0 victory, United lay bottom and Ian McCall was sacked, with Assistant Gordon Chisholm handed temporary control. Chisholm's first match was a live television affair at home to Celtic and only a Craig Bellamy hat-trick denied United a point, who equalised twice only to lose 3–2.

United went into April with a league/cup double-header against Hibs and lost the league match 3–2 at Easter Road to another late goal. The cup semi-final brought cheer, as Jason Scotland's winner ensured a final appearance in May, along with European football. The buzz from the win carried on, with successive impressive league victories at Rangers and at home to Hearts. A home draw to Livingston brought a blip but a 2–1 derby win at Dens Park closed the month in style, with caretaker-manager Gordon Chisholm winning the Manager of the Month award in his first full month in charge.

Into May and a lack of wins scared United fans, with only a home draw against Kilmarnock and a last-minute defeat to Dunfermline. This left United going into final game at Inverness as one of four clubs who could be relegated, along with Livingston, Dunfermline and Dundee. Dundee's early goal against Livingston moved them out of bottom spot, only for ex-United player Craig Easton to equalise. With no further goals and Barry Robson's penalty winner in Inverness, United survived, finishing in 9th place.

The Cup Final was a tense occasion, with Martin O'Neill's last match in charge bringing an edge to the 50,635 crowd. Alan Thompson's 9th-minute deflected free-kick ultimately won it for Celtic, with Chris Sutton missing a late penalty before Alan Archibald's injury-time drive nearly securing extra-time.

== Fixtures and results ==
All results are written with Dundee United's score first.

=== Scottish Premier League ===
Date	Opponent	Venue	Result	Attendance	Scorers
7 August 2004	Dunfermline Athletic	A	1–1	6,512	McIntyre
15 August 2004	Dundee	H	1–2	11,118	Archibald
21 August 2004	Livingston	A	1–1	3,659	Dodds
28 August 2004	Inverness CT	H	2–1	6,017	Innes, McIntyre
11 September 2004	Aberdeen	H	1–1	10,995	Wilson
18 September 2004	Motherwell	A	2–4	5,091	Grady, McIntyre
25 September 2004	Kilmarnock	A	2–5	4,711	Archibald, Dodds
3 October 2004	Celtic	H	0–3	10,329	
10 October 2004	Hibernian	A	0–2	9,927	
24 October 2004	Rangers	A	1–1	46,796	Robson
27 October 2004	Heart of Midlothian	H	1–1	5,723	Wilson
30 October 2004	Dunfermline Athletic	H	1–2	6,297	Wilson
6 November 2004	Dundee	H	0–1	9,845	
13 November 2004	Livingston	H	1–0	5,507	McCracken
23 November 2004	Inverness CT	A	1–1	1,125	McIntyre
27 November 2004	Aberdeen	A	0–1	12,038	
4 December 2004	Motherwell	H	0–1	5,252	
11 December 2004	Kilmarnock	H	3–0	5,097	Brebner, Robson, McIntyre
18 December 2004	Celtic	A	0–1	56,318	
27 December 2004	Hibernian	H	1–4	10,152	Scotland
1 January 2005	Rangers	H	1–1	10,461	McCracken
15 January 2005	Heart of Midlothian	A	2–3	10,305	Robson, Archibald
22 January 2005	Dunfermline Athletic	A	1–1	6,589	Crawford
29 January 2005	Dundee	H	2–2	12,703	Duff, McIntyre
12 February 2005	Livingston	A	2–0	5,158	Crawford, Grady
19 February 2005	Inverness CT	H	1–1	6,110	Own goal
2 March 2005	Aberdeen	H	1–2	6,688	Scotland
5 March 2005	Motherwell	A	0–2	5,110	
12 March 2005	Kilmarnock	A	0–3	4,353	
19 March 2005	Celtic	H	2–3	10,828	McIntyre, Robson
2 April 2005	Hibernian	A	2–3	11,058	McIntyre, Scotland
12 April 2005	Rangers	A	1–0	49,302	Duff
16 April 2005	Heart of Midlothian	H	2–1	7,704	Robson, Brebner
23 April 2005	Livingston	H	1–1	7,687	Crawford
30 April 2005	Dundee	A	2–1	11,263	Wilson, McIntyre
7 May 2005	Kilmarnock	H	1–1	6,576	McIntyre
15 May 2005	Dunfermline Athletic	H	0–1	10,763	
21 May 2005	Inverness CT	A	1–0	5,479	Robson

=== Scottish Cup ===
Date	Round	Opponent	Venue	Result	Attendance	Scorers
17 January 2005	Third round	Gretna	A	4–3	3,000	Robson, Kerr, Wilson, Crawford
5 February 2005	Fourth round	Queen of the South	A	3–0	5,532	McIntyre, Wilson, Duff
27 February 2005	Quarter–finals	Aberdeen	H	4–1	8,661	Archibald, Grady (2), Crawford
9 April 2005	Semi–finals	Hibernian	N	2–1	27,271	McIntyre, Scotland
28 May 2005	Final	Celtic	N	0–1	50,635	

=== Scottish League Cup ===
Date	Round	Opponent	Venue	Result	Attendance	Scorers
25 August 2004	Second round	Stranraer	H	3–1	2,511	Kerr, Grady, Innes
21 September 2004	Third round	Clyde	H	4–0	2,336	McIntyre, Robson, Brebner, Wilson
9 November 2004	Quarter–finals	Hibernian	H	2–1	4,865	McIntyre (2)
2 February 2005	Semi–finals	Rangers	N	1–7	25,622	Scotland

== Player statistics ==
During the 2004–05 season, United used 26 different players comprising five nationalities, with a further six named as unused substitutes. The table below shows the number of appearances and goals scored by each player.

No.	Pos	Nat	Player	Total		Bank of Scotland Premierleague		Tennent's Scottish Cup		CIS Insurance Cup	
No.	Pos	Nat	Player	Apps	Goals	Apps	Goals	Apps	Goals	Apps	Goals
1	GK	(England) ENG	Tony Bullock	32	0	26	0	5	0	1	0
2	DF	(Scotland) SCO	Mark Wilson	46	7	37	4	5	2	4	1
3	DF	(Scotland) SCO	David McCracken	29	2	25	2	0	0	4	0
4	MF	(Scotland) SCO	Derek McInnes	33	0	27	0	3	0	3	0
5	DF	(Scotland) SCO	Alan Archibald	47	4	38	3	5	1	4	0
7	MF	(Scotland) SCO	Mark Kerr	37	2	30	0	5	1	2	1
8	MF	(Scotland) SCO	Grant Brebner	40	3	34	2	4	0	2	1
9	FW	(Trinidad and Tobago) TTO	Collin Samuel	24	0	18	0	3	0	3	0
10	FW	(Scotland) SCO	Jim McIntyre	42	15	35	10	3	2	4	3
11	MF	(Scotland) SCO	Barry Robson	45	8	36	6	5	1	4	1
12	MF	(Scotland) SCO	Stuart Duff	32	3	25	2	4	1	3	0
14	MF	(Scotland) SCO	Billy Dodds	25	2	21	2	0	0	4	0
15	DF	(Scotland) SCO	Lee Mair	7	0	4	0	2	0	1	0
16	FW	(Scotland) SCO	James Grady	34	5	29	2	3	2	2	1
17	GK	(Canada) CAN	Lars Hirschfeld	3	0	2	0	0	0	1	0
18	MF	(Scotland) SCO	Andy McLaren	8	0	6	0	0	0	2	0
19	FW	(Scotland) SCO	Stevie Crawford	23	5	17	3	5	2	1	0
20	FW	(Trinidad and Tobago) TTO	Jason Scotland	37	5	29	3	4	1	4	1
21	MF	(Algeria) ALG	Karim Kerkar	10	0	10	0	0	0	0	0
23	DF	(Scotland) SCO	Paul Ritchie	31	0	24	0	5	0	2	0
24	GK	(Scotland) SCO	Paul Jarvie	11	0	10	0	0	0	1	0
29	MF	(Scotland) SCO	Barry Callaghan	1	0	1	0	0	0	0	0
36	MF	(Scotland) SCO	Greg Cameron	3	0	2	0	1	0	0	0
39	DF	(Scotland) SCO	Garry Kenneth	14	0	11	0	3	0	0	0
47	GK	(Republic of Ireland) IRL	Nick Colgan	2	0	1	0	0	0	1	0

=== Goalscorers ===
United had 13 players score with the team scoring 41 goals in total. The top goalscorer was Jim McIntyre, who finished the season with fifteen goals.

Name	League	Cups	Total
Jim McIntyre	10	5	15
Barry Robson	6	2	8
Mark Wilson	4	3	7
Stevie Crawford	3	2	5
Jason Scotland	3	2	5
James Grady	2	3	5
Alan Archibald	3	1	4
Grant Brebner	2	1	3
Stuart Duff	2	1	3
Billy Dodds	2	0	2
David McCracken	2	0	2
Chris Innes	1	1	2
Mark Kerr	0	2	2

=== Discipline ===
During the 2004–05 season, three United players were sent off, and 17 players received at least one yellow card. In total, the team received three dismissals and 78 cautions.

Name	Cautions	Dismissals
Barry Robson	(yellow card) 10	(red card) 1
Paul Ritchie	(yellow card) 9	(red card) 1
Mark Wilson	(yellow card) 3	(red card) 1
Derek McInnes	(yellow card) 12	
Mark Kerr	(yellow card) 9	
Alan Archibald	(yellow card) 6	
Grant Brebner	(yellow card) 6	
Jim McIntyre	(yellow card) 5	
Billy Dodds	(yellow card) 2	
James Grady	(yellow card) 2	
David McCracken	(yellow card) 2	
Andy McLaren	(yellow card) 2	
Stevie Crawford	(yellow card) 1	
Garry Kenneth	(yellow card) 1	
Lee Mair	(yellow card) 1	
Collin Samuel	(yellow card) 1	
Jason Scotland	(yellow card) 1	

== Competitions ==
=== League table ===
Pos	Team	Pld	W	D	L	GF	GA	GD	Pts	Qualification or relegation (Note: Teams played each other three times (33 matches), before the league split into two groups (the top six and the bottom six) for the last five matches.)
7	Kilmarnock	38	15	4	19	49	55	−6	49	
8	Inverness Caledonian Thistle	38	11	11	16	41	47	−6	44	
9	Dundee United	38	8	12	18	41	59	−18	36	Qualification for the UEFA Cup second qualifying round (Note: As Celtic, the 2004–05 Scottish Cup winners, qualified for the UEFA Champions League via their league position, the place in the UEFA Cup was passed onto Dundee United, the cup runners-up.)
10	Livingston	38	9	8	21	34	61	−27	35	
11	Dunfermline Athletic	38	8	10	20	34	60	−26	34	

Source: Scottish Professional Football League
Rules for classification: 1) Points; 2) Goal difference; 3) Goals scored

== Transfers ==
=== In ===
Date	Player	From	Fee
19 August 2004	(Canada) Lars Hirschfeld	(England) Tottenham Hotspur	Free
27 August 2004	(Scotland) Grant Brebner	(Scotland) Hibernian	Free
4 January 2005	(Scotland) Stevie Crawford	(England) Plymouth Argyle	£80,000
7 January 2005	(Scotland) Lee Mair	(Scotland) Celtic	Free

=== Out ===
Date	Player	To	Fee
14 July 2004	(Scotland) Jim Paterson	(Scotland) Motherwell	Free
21 July 2004	(Republic of Ireland) Owen Coyle	(Scotland) Airdrie United	Free
20 January 2005	(Scotland) Aaron Conway	(Scotland) Dundee	Free
27 January 2005	(Canada) Lars Hirschfeld	(England) Leicester City	Free
28 January 2005	(Scotland) Chris Innes	(Scotland) Gretna	Free
31 January 2005	(Scotland) Paul Jarvie	(England) Torquay United	Free
31 January 2005	(Scotland) Stephen O'Donnell	(England) Boston United	Free

=== Loans in ===
Date	Player	From	Until
28 January 2005	(Republic of Ireland) Nick Colgan	(England) Barnsley	End of season

=== Loans out ===
Date	Player	To	Until
27 August 2004	(Scotland) Aaron Conway	(Scotland) Clyde	January
27 August 2004	(Scotland) Graeme Holmes	(Scotland) Dumbarton	January
2 November 2004	(Scotland) Andy McLaren	(Scotland) Partick Thistle	January
1 February 2005	(Scotland) Scott Paterson	(Scotland) Partick Thistle	End of season
26 February 2005	(Scotland) Andy McLaren	(Scotland) Greenock Morton	End of season
