= McConalogue =

McConalogue (Irish: Mac Conaill Óig or Mac Dhomhnaill Óig) is a surname. Notable people with the surname include:

- Charlie McConalogue (born 1977), Irish politician
- Stephen McConalogue (born 1981), Scottish footballer
