= Stephen Wright (Scottish footballer) =

Scottish footballer

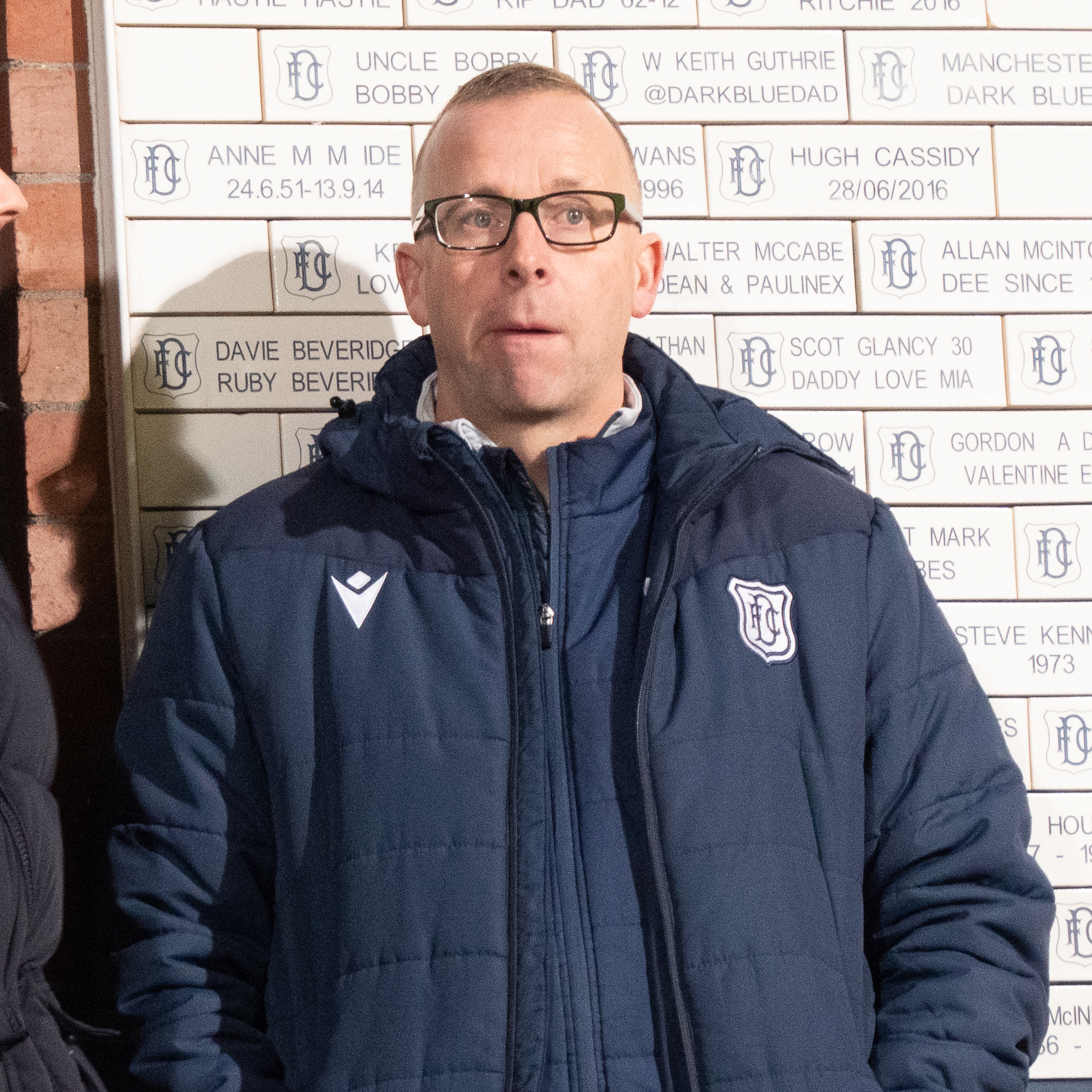
- Wright in 2025

Personal information
- Date of birth: 27 August 1971 (age 55)
- Place of birth: Bellshill, Scotland
- Position: Right-back

Team information
- Current team: Dundee (Head of Academy)

Youth career
- Eastercraigs B.C.
- 1986–1990: Aberdeen

Senior career*
Years	Team	Apps	(Gls)
1990–1995	Aberdeen	150	(2)
1995–1998	Rangers	7	(0)
1998	→ Wolverhampton Wanderers (loan)	3	(0)
1998–2000	Bradford City	30	(0)
2000–2002	Dundee United	14	(0)
2002	Scunthorpe United	2	(0)
Total		206	(2)

International career
1991–1993	Scotland U21	15	(0)
1993	Scotland	2	(0)
1994–1995	Scotland B	2	(1)
- * Club domestic league appearances and goals

Stephen Wright (born 27 August 1971) is a Scottish former footballer who played as a right-back. Wright is currently the Head of Academy for Dundee.

== Playing career ==
=== Club ===
Raised in Hamilton, Wright started his career with Aberdeen – progressing through the ranks alongside Eoin Jess and Scott Booth – and made 181 first team appearances for the Dons; he was part of the squad that came close to winning the League title on the last day of the Scottish Premier League in the 1990–91 season, and achieved further league runners-up finishes in 1992–93 and 1993–94, as well as reaching the 1992 Scottish League Cup Final and 1993 Scottish Cup Final, losing out to Rangers on every occasion. In 1994–95 the club's results were unexpectedly poor and they escaped relegation only via a play-off; these turned out to be Wright's last matches for the club, and the situation also meant his wedding took place in the short time between the regular season and the matches against Dunfermline Athletic rather than in a more relaxed atmosphere after its conclusion, as he had planned.

In the summer of 1995, he joined his boyhood heroes (and Aberdeen's main rivals) Rangers for £1.5m. Much of his time at Ibrox was spent injured, following a rupture of the anterior cruciate ligament in his knee during a UEFA Champions League match against Juventus in his first season. After just seven league appearances in three years (his spell with the Gers coincided almost exactly with that of Paul Gascoigne who in contrast played over 100 times), Wright had a loan spell with Wolverhampton Wanderers before joining Bradford City in 1998, where he reunited with former Rangers teammate Stuart McCall and helped the club gain promotion to the Premier League in his first season, although he did not make a league appearance in his second.

Those two years with the Bantams preceded another two back in Scotland with Dundee United, where he took an interest in the coaching aspect of the game, before he finished his playing career in 2002 with a short spell at Scunthorpe United.

=== International ===
Wright won two international caps while playing for Aberdeen, in March and May 1993.

== Coaching career ==
Wright joined Dunfermline Athletic as first-team coach in January 2008, moving from a youth coaching role at Rangers.

He coached with Fife Elite Football Academy (developing players for the Fife region's four professional clubs: Cowdenbeath, Dunfermline Athletic, East Fife and Raith Rovers) for nearly a decade before returning to Rangers in May 2017.

Wright became the Head of Academy at Dundee F.C. in February 2019.

== Career statistics ==
=== Club ===
Appearances and goals by club, season and competition
Club	Season	League			National Cup		League Cup		Europe		Total	
Club	Season	Division	Apps	Goals	Apps	Goals	Apps	Goals	Apps	Goals	Apps	Goals
Aberdeen	1989–90	Scottish Premier Division	1	0	0	0	0	0	0	0	1	0
Aberdeen	1990–91	Scottish Premier Division	18	1	1	0	0	0	0	0	19	1
Aberdeen	1991–92	Scottish Premier Division	23	0	1	0	2	0	1	0	27	0
Aberdeen	1992–93	Scottish Premier Division	36	0	5	0	5	0	0	0	46	0
Aberdeen	1993–94	Scottish Premier Division	36	0	4	0	1	0	3	0	44	0
Aberdeen	1994–95	Scottish Premier Division	36	1	2	0	4	0	2	0	44	1
Aberdeen	Total		150	2	13	0	12	0	6	0	181	2
Rangers	1995–96	Scottish Premier Division	6	0	0	0	4	0	6	0	16	0
Rangers	1996–97	Scottish Premier Division	1	0	0	0	1	0	0	0	2	0
Rangers	1997–98	Scottish Premier Division	0	0	0	0	0	0	1	0	1	0
Rangers	Total		7	0	0	0	5	0	7	0	19	0
Wolverhampton Wanderers (loan)	1997–98	First Division	3	0	0	0	0	0	-	-	3	0
Bradford City	1998–99	First Division	22	0	1	0	0	0	-	-	23	0
Bradford City	1999–00	Premier League	8	0	0	0	3	0	0	0	11	0
Bradford City	Total		30	0	1	0	3	0	-	-	34	0
Dundee United	2000–01	SPL	5	0	0	0	2	0	0	0	7	0
Dundee United	2001–02	SPL	9	0	2	0	0	0	0	0	11	0
Dundee United	Total		14	0	2	0	2	0	0	0	18	0
Scunthorpe United	2002–03	Third Division	2	0	1	0	1	0	-	-	4	0
Career total			206	2	17	0	23	0	13	0	259	2

=== International ===
Appearances and goals by national team and year
National team	Year	Apps	Goals
Scotland	1993	2	0
Total		2	0
