= Peter van de Ven =

Dutch footballer

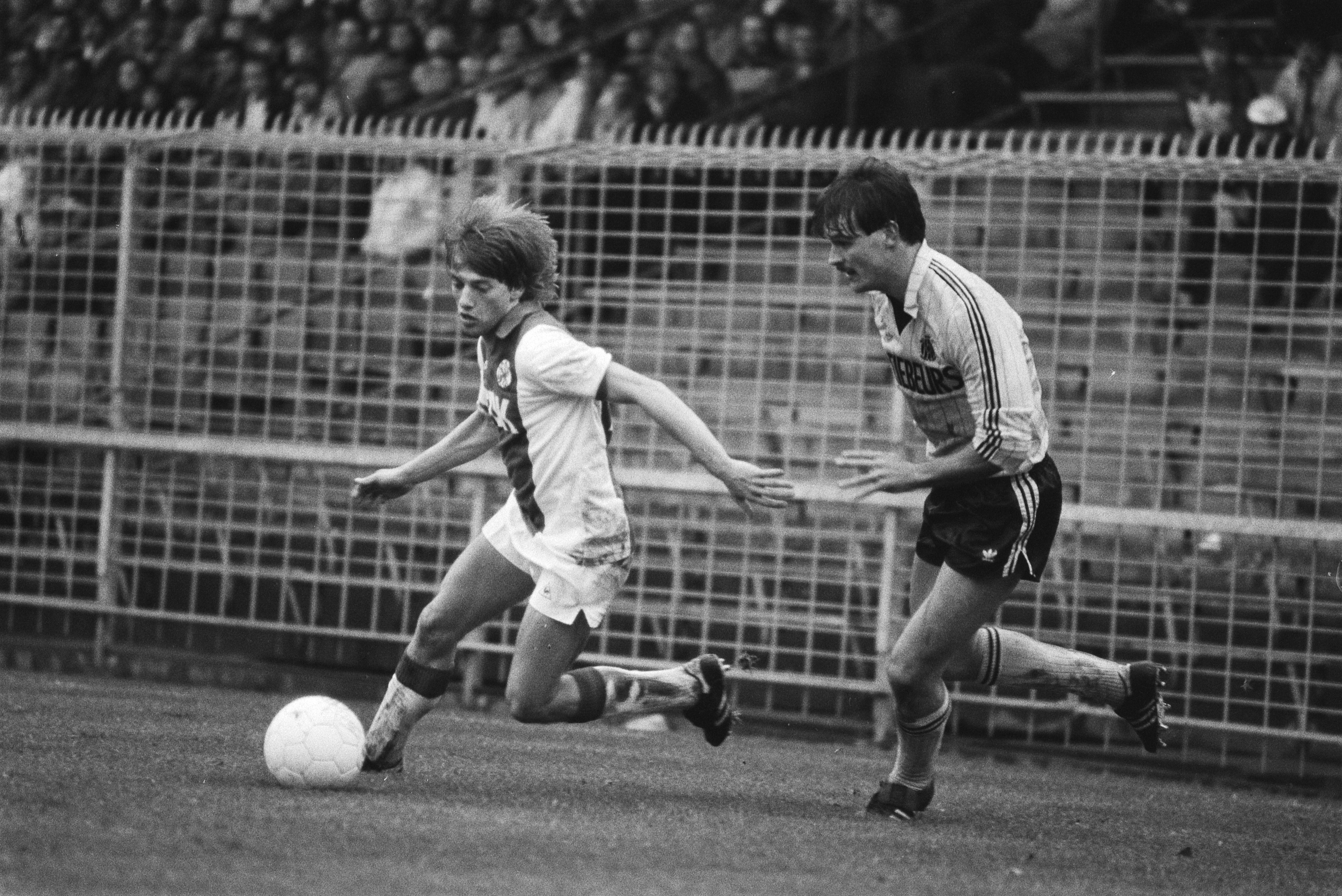
- Jesper Olsen (left) and van de Ven in 1983

Personal information
- Full name: Peter van de Ven
- Date of birth: 8 January 1961 (age 65)
- Place of birth: Hunsel, Netherlands
- Height: 6 ft 1 in (1.85 m)
- Position: Midfielder

Senior career*
Years	Team	Apps	(Gls)
1978–1981	Fortuna Sittard	38	(3)
1981–1986	Roda JC	162	(26)
1986–1989	Charleroi	82	(11)
1989–1990	Willem II	30	(4)
1990–1992	Aberdeen	55	(2)
1992–1994	Hearts	39	(0)
1994–1995	Racing Genk	11	(1)
Total		417	(47)
- * Club domestic league appearances and goals

Peter van de Ven (born 8 January 1961) is a Dutch former professional footballer who played as a midfielder.

== Career ==
Born in Hunsel, Van de Ven spent the first half of his career in his home province of Limburg. In 1981 he transferred from Fortuna Sittard to provincial rivals Roda JC. With Roda JC he helped the club to fifth place in the Eredivisie in the 1985–86 season, one point short of qualifying for the UEFA Cup. He signed with Belgian club Charleroi in 1986.

After a spell with Willem II, he moved to Scotland in 1990 to play with Aberdeen, making 55 league appearances in two seasons. At Aberdeen he played alongside fellow Dutch players Willem van der Ark, Theo ten Caat, Theo Snelders, and Hans Gillhaus; during his time there the team finished second in the 1990–91 Scottish Premier Division, between Rangers and Celtic. Van de Ven also played for Hearts, making 39 league appearances. In the final year of his career, Van de Ven played in Belgium for Racing Genk.
