= Kevin McDonald (footballer, born 1981) =

Scottish footballer

Personal information
- Date of birth: 23 January 1981 (age 45)
- Place of birth: Rutherglen, Scotland
- Position: Midfielder

Youth career
- –1997: Dundee United

Senior career*
Years	Team	Apps	(Gls)
1999–2001	Dundee United	1	(0)
2001	→ Greenock Morton (loan)	2	(0)
2001–2002	Ross County	1	(0)
2002–2003	Drogheda United	2	(0)

International career
- Scotland under-15
- Scotland under-16
- * Club domestic league appearances and goals

Kevin McDonald (born 23 January 1981) is a Scottish former footballer who played as a midfielder. His most prominent club was Dundee United, where he returned to work as a community coach after ending his playing career.

== Career ==
Having been developed as a player through Dundee United's youth scheme, he turned professional with the club in July 1997. McDonald made his United debut in a League Cup tie at home to Airdrie in September 2000 and appeared as a substitute in the Dundee derby two weeks later. During the derby match, McDonald – who himself suffered concussion and sickness – admitted responsibility for a challenge that saw teammate Jason de Vos wrongly sent off for challenging Fabián Caballero, injuring the Argentine for several months. The fallout from the challenge saw Dundee manager Ivano Bonetti call de Vos "an animal", prompting the Canadian to consider legal action. McDonald failed to make another appearance for United and went on loan to Greenock Morton in January 2001, playing three times for them. In October, McDonald was released from United along with youngsters Blair Sturrock and Gary Middleton.

McDonald captained Scotland's under-15 and under-16 teams.
