= Marc Cocozza =

Scottish footballer

Personal information
- Date of birth: 8 January 1981 (age 45)
- Place of birth: Glasgow, Scotland
- Position: Defender

Youth career
- 1995–1997: Celtic

Senior career*
Years	Team	Apps	(Gls)
1997–2001	Celtic	0	(0)
2001–2002	Dundee United	2	(0)
2003	Forfar Athletic	2	(0)
2003–2004	Johnstone Burgh		
2004–2005	Maryhill		

International career
1997–1998	Scotland U16		
1998–1999	Scotland U17		
1999–2000	Scotland U19		
- * Club domestic league appearances and goals

Marc Cocozza (born 8 January 1981) is a Scottish former footballer. After beginning his career as a youth player at Celtic, he briefly played for both Dundee United and Forfar Athletic.

== Career ==
Cocozza began his career with Celtic but failed to make a senior appearance for the club, leaving in November 2001 to sign for Dundee United. Cocozza made his debut in a televised match against Celtic but made only one further substitute appearance and failed to earn an extension to his short-term deal. After being released in April 2002, Cocozza moved to Forfar Athletic at the start of the 2002–03 season, although had to wait until February 2003 to make his debut. After playing in three matches, Cocozza was released by the end of the season and he left senior football, signing for junior club Johnstone Burgh. The following year, Cocozza joined Maryhill, where he stayed until 2005.

In 2014, Cocozza was appointed manager of the Ayrshire Amateur Football Association's select team, having previously been assistant manager.

== International career ==
Cocozza represent his country at several age levels, playing for Scotland at under-16, under-17 and under-19 level.
