= Paul Jarvie =

Scottish footballer

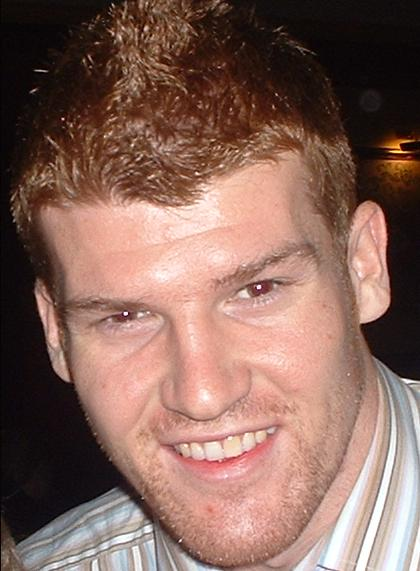

Personal information
- Full name: Paul Jarvie
- Date of birth: 14 June 1982 (age 44)
- Place of birth: Aberdeen, Scotland
- Position: Goalkeeper

Team information
- Current team: Peterhead

Youth career
- –1999: Dundee United

Senior career*
Years	Team	Apps	(Gls)
1999–2005	Dundee United	11	(0)
2001–2002	→ Stenhousemuir (loan)	5	(0)
2004	→ Forfar Athletic (loan)	0	(0)
2005	Bristol City	0	(0)
2005	Torquay United	1	(0)
2005–2006	Clyde	18	(0)
2006–2008	Inverurie Loco Works	37	(0)
2008–	Peterhead	70	(1)
- * Club domestic league appearances and goals as of 23:46, 26 February 2014 (UTC)

Paul Jarvie (born 14 June 1982) is a Scottish footballer who plays as a goalkeeper for Scottish League One side Peterhead.

== Playing career ==
Jarvie joined Dundee United from school and turned professional in May 1999. He signed for Stenhousemuir on loan on 24 November 2001, and his league début came the same day, when he played in a 1–1 draw at home to Queen of the South. He finally made his United début on the final day of the 2001–02 season, as a half-time substitute for regular keeper Paul Gallacher.

He joined Forfar Athletic on loan in September 2004. He was supposed to stay until the end of December, but stayed only three days before being recalled by United after regular keeper Tony Bullock suffered a broken collar bone. He finally made his first start for United on 3 October 2004, playing in the 3–0 defeat at home to Celtic and remained in the team for the next nine games. Jarvie's most notable appearance for United come in the local derby match against neighbours Dundee, where Jarvie allowed a weak header to slip through his legs in the closing minutes of the match to hand Dundee victory.

Jarvie was released by Dundee United in January 2005 and joined Bristol City on non-contract terms. He joined Torquay United the following month, one of seven goalkeepers used by the Gulls that season. He played just once for Torquay, in a 4–1 defeat away to Barnsley on 26 February 2005, conceding three goals in the first thirty minutes.

Jarvie was released at the end of the season and returned to Scotland, joining Clyde in July 2005, one of eleven players signed within 24 hours by Clyde manager, Graham Roberts. He played eighteen times for Clyde, but in the summer of 2006, he dropped out of the professional game to sign for Inverurie Loco Works. He returned to the senior game after a two-year absence signing for Peterhead in July 2008.
