= Stéphane Léoni =

French footballer and manager (born 1976)

Personal information
- Date of birth: 5 March 1976 (age 50)
- Place of birth: Saint-Mihiel, France
- Height: 1.80 m (5 ft 11 in)
- Position: Left-back

Senior career*
| Years | Team | Apps | (Gls) |
| 1993–1998 | Metz B | | |
| 1998–2000 | Bristol Rovers | 38 | (0) |
| 2000–2001 | Dundee United | 6 | (0) |
| 2001–2002 | Sedan | 8 | (0) |
| 2002–2003 | AS Beauvais | 36 | (0) |
| 2003–2004 | SpVgg Greuther Fürth | 0 | (0) |
| 2004–2005 | FC Rouen | | |
| 2005–2006 | FC Sète | | |
| 2006–2009 | Metz | 36 | (0) |
| 2009–2010 | AS Cannes | 17 | (0) |
| 2010–2012 | FC Differdange 03 | 34 | (0) |

Managerial career
- 2012–2013: Amiens (assistant)
- 2013: Amiens (caretaker)
- 2015–2018: FC Trémery
- 2018–2020: Sarre-Union
- 2020–2022: Progrès Niederkorn
- * Club domestic league appearances and goals

Stéphane Léoni (born 5 March 1976) is a French former footballer, who was most recently manager of Progrès Niederkorn.

== Playing career ==
Léoni was born in Saint-Mihiel. A defender, he initially joined Metz as a youth player but failed to break through to the first team. After leaving the club in 1998 he sought to continue his career in England, signing for Bristol Rovers, where he spent two seasons and scored his only goal for the club in an FA Cup tie against Rotherham United in January 1999. In 2000, he had a four-month spell with Dundee United in the Scottish Premier League before returning to France. Since then, he has spent a season each with CS Sedan Ardennes, AS Beauvais Oise, FC Rouen and FC Sète prior to rejoining his first club, Metz, in June 2006, before signed in summer 2009 for AS Cannes.

== Coaching career ==
Returning to FC Metz in June 2012, Léoni was hired as a playing assistant coach. After manager Francis De Taddeo was fired on 15 September 2013, Léoni was appointed manager on interim basis. Léoni left Amiens 10 days later, as Olivier Echouafni was hired.

After a three-year spell as FC Trémery's manager, Léoni was appointed manager of US Sarre-Union in June 2018. He left the club in May 2020, in the wake of financial difficulties caused by the COVID-19 pandemic. At the end of November 2020, Léoni was appointed manager of Luxembourgish club FC Progrès Niederkorn, signing a deal until June 2023. However, after difficult second part of the 2021-22 season, Leóni left the club at the end of the campaign, one year before his contract expired.
