= John Licina =

French footballer (born 1976)

Personal information
- Full name: John Licina
- Date of birth: 6 August 1976 (age 50)
- Place of birth: France
- Height: 1.85 m (6 ft 1 in)
- Position: Defender

Team information
- Current team: US Valdoie

Youth career
- 1994–1998: FC Sochaux

Senior career*
Years	Team	Apps	(Gls)
1998–2000	FC Sochaux	9	(0)
2000–2001	Dundee United	7	(0)
2001–2003	Belfort	43	(0)
2004–2009	SR Delémont	120	(4)
2010–	US Valdoie	8	(0)
- * Club domestic league appearances and goals

John Licina (born 6 August 1976) is a French footballer, who plays for US Valdoie.

== Career ==
Licina started his career with FC Sochaux. He signed for Scottish club Dundee United in September 2000 following a successful trial. After initially appearancing in the first team he lost his place in the side and was placed on the transfer list in May 2001. After a proposed loan move to Arbroath, Licina was once again told he could leave Dundee United in October 2001.

Licina moved to Belfort then spent three years with SR Delémont before leaving at the end of the 2006–07 season. Licina returned in December 2007 and vowed to stay until at least the end of the season.
