= Carlos Marcora =

Uruguayan footballer (born 1976)

Personal information
- Full name: Carlos Eduardo Marcora De Santis
- Date of birth: 1 February 1976 (age 50)
- Place of birth: Montevideo, Uruguay
- Height: 1.69 m (5 ft 7 in)
- Position: Midfielder

Senior career*
| Years | Team | Apps | (Gls) |
| 1998–1999 | Deportivo Maldonado | | |
| 1999–2000 | Tigres | | |
| 2000 | Dundee United | 1 | (0) |
| 2000 | Real España | | |
| 2001–2003 | Deportivo Maldonado | | |
| 2003–2004 | Paniliakos | | |
| 2004–2005 | Panionios | | |
| 2005–2006 | Panserraikos | | |
| 2007–2009 | Thraysvoulos | | |
| 2009–2010 | Preveza | | |
| 2010 | Club Deportes Concepción | | |
- * Club domestic league appearances and goals

Carlos Eduardo Marcora De Santis (born 1 February 1976 in Montevideo) is a former Uruguayan footballer.

Marcora was signed by the Tangerines on 30 September 2000, along with Marcelino Galoppo. He made his only appearance for the Tangerines, in a 4–0 loss against Hearts on 14 October 2000. Shortly after, Marcora were among six South American players to leave Dundee United.
