= Marcelino Galoppo =

Argentine footballer

Personal information
- Full name: Marcelino Galoppo
- Date of birth: 1970 (age 55–56)
- Place of birth: Freyre, Córdoba Province, Argentina
- Position: Midfielder

Senior career*
Years	Team	Apps	(Gls)
1990–1991	Racing de Córdoba	-	
1991	Deportivo Español	7	(0)
1991–1993	Platense	29	(0)
1993–1995	Quilmes	-	
1995–1996	Huracán de Corrientes	-	
1996–1997	Chacarita Juniors	-	
1997–1998	Talleres	-	
1998–1999	Club Atlético Tucumán	-	
1999–2000	Club Almirante Brown	-	
2000–2001	Dundee United	2	(0)
2001–?	Sanremese		
?–2003	Ventimiglia		
2003	Argentinos Juniors		

International career
- Argentina U-20
- Argentina U-23
- * Club domestic league appearances and goals

Marcelino Galoppo is an Argentine former footballer who represented his country at under-20 and under-23 level.

Galoppo was mainly a 2nd division player, but he had spells in the Primera Division Argentina and in the Scottish Premier League with Dundee United. Galoppo was signed by the Tangerines on 30 September 2000, along with Carlos Marcora. He made his debut for Dundee United, starting a match and played 79 minutes before being substituted, in a 3-0 loss against Rangers on 2 October 2000. After making another appearance for the Tangerines, Galoppo were among six South American players to leave Dundee United.

His son, Giuliano, is a professional footballer.
