= Lee Richardson (footballer) =

English footballer and manager

Personal information
- Full name: Lee James Richardson
- Date of birth: 12 March 1969 (age 57)
- Place of birth: Halifax, England
- Position: Midfielder

Senior career*
Years	Team	Apps	(Gls)
1987–1989	Halifax Town	72	(4)
1989–1990	Watford	44	(1)
1990–1992	Blackburn Rovers	67	(5)
1992–1994	Aberdeen	77	(10)
1994–1997	Oldham Athletic	101	(24)
1997	→ Stockport County (loan)	6	(0)
1997–2000	Huddersfield Town	38	(5)
1999	→ Bury (loan)	5	(1)
2000	Livingston	7	(0)
2000–2004	Chesterfield	55	(2)
Total		409	(50)

Managerial career
- 2003: Chesterfield (caretaker)
- 2007–2009: Chesterfield
- * Club domestic league appearances and goals

Lee James Richardson (born 12 March 1969 in Halifax, Yorkshire) is a former professional footballer and until 6 May 2009 he was manager of Chesterfield. He is the younger brother of Nick Richardson, who briefly played alongside him for Halifax Town.

== Playing career ==
Richardson, an energetic midfield player, began his career at his local club Halifax Town, before enjoying spells at a number of clubs throughout Britain. He had particularly successful seasons at Aberdeen and Oldham Athletic in the mid nineties, and ended his playing career at Chesterfield.

Whilst at Aberdeen he was part of a team which finished second to Rangers in all three domestic competitions in 1992–93.

== Management career ==
Richardson was appointed as Chesterfield manager in April 2007, following a spell as caretaker. He was unable to stop them from being relegated to League Two. In April 2008, with Chesterfield lying 8th in League Two, Richardson was linked with the vacant managerial position at League One side Huddersfield Town. On 3 November 2008, it was announced that Richardson was up for nomination for the League Two manager of the month for October but was beaten by Peter Jackson of Lincoln City. Richardson was nominated for the same award in March 2009 and won it after his team took 18 points to push towards the play-offs.

On 6 May 2009 Richardson left Chesterfield after the club decided not to renew his contract, after he was unable to guide the club to promotion from League Two. Richardson, fresh from his Chesterfield days, then announced his interest in the vacant posts at Burton Albion and Port Vale, but neither clubs decided to appoint him.

Richardson now works as a psychologist with Lancashire C.C.C and Liverpool F.C. He also runs a business called AIM-FOR along with his brother Nick also a former professional footballer.

== Honours ==
=== As a player ===
Blackburn Rovers

- Football League Second Division play-offs: 1992

=== As a manager ===
Individual

- Football League Two Manager of the Month: March 2009
