= Anastasios Venetis =

Greek footballer (born 1980)

Tasos Venetis
Personal information
- Full name: Anastasios Venetis
- Date of birth: 24 March 1980 (age 46)
- Place of birth: Larissa, Greece
- Height: 1.88 m (6 ft 2 in)
- Position: Defender

Youth career
- –1996: Apollon Larissa

Senior career*
Years	Team	Apps	(Gls)
1996–1997	Iraklis	0	(0)
1997–1999	AEL	41	(1)
1999–2003	Dundee United	57	(2)
2003	Ross County	9	(1)
2003–2004	Akratitos	23	(0)
2005–2006	Kallithea	24	(1)
2006–2008	AEL	19	(0)
2008–2009	OFI	5	(0)
2009–2013	Kerkyra	89	(3)
2013–2017	AOK Kerkyra	104	(3)

International career^{‡}
2000	Greece U21	6	(0)
- * Club domestic league appearances and goals as of 1 October 2017 ‡ National team caps and goals as of 10 October 2000

Anastasios "Tasos" Venetis (Greek: Αναστάσιος "Τάσος" Βενέτης; born 24 March 1980) is a Greek former professional footballer who played as a defender.

== Club career ==
Born in Larissa, Venetis began his career with Apollon Larissa and he was transferred to Iraklis at the age of 16. The next season moved to AEL after failing to make an appearance. After two years, he moved to Scotland and spent three-and-a-half years with Scottish Premier League side Dundee United, with a further six months at Ross County. At Ross County he scored once against Inverness Caledonian Thistle. Venetis moved back to his homeland Greece in 2003, where he would play for Akratitos, Kallithea, AEL and OFI in the Super League.

Venetis played for the Greece national under-21 football team, making his debut in 2000.
