= Hugh Davidson (footballer) =

Scottish footballer

Personal information
- Full name: Hugh Davidson
- Date of birth: 3 August 1980 (age 46)
- Place of birth: Dundee, Scotland
- Position: Midfielder

Youth career
- –1997: Dundee United

Senior career*
Years	Team	Apps	(Gls)
1997–2003	Dundee United	34	(1)
2002	→ Raith Rovers (loan)	11	(1)
2002–2003	→ Stirling Albion (loan)	16	(0)
2003–2005	Forfar Athletic	52	(3)
2005–2006	Arbroath	14	(1)
2006–2011	Montrose	148	(4)

International career
1999–2000	Scotland under-21	4	(0)
- * Club domestic league appearances and goals

Hugh Norman Davidson (born 3 August 1980 in Dundee) is a Scottish retired footballer who played as a midfielder. During his career he played for Dundee United, Forfar Athletic, Arbroath and Montrose and had loan spells with Raith Rovers and Stirling Albion. He made four appearances for the Scotland under-21 team.

== Career ==
Having been developed as a player through Dundee United's youth scheme, Davidson made his debut in the 1999-00 season. Davidson made 23 league appearances in his first season, mostly from the start, although he failed to score from his right midfield position. The following season, he made only eleven league appearances, and despite scoring his first league goal, would not feature again in the United first team as of injuries. Davidson spent all of 2002 on loan at Raith Rovers and Stirling Albion, and it was no surprise when he moved away permanently to Forfar Athletic again due to injuries in time for the 2003-04 season. Davidson spent two seasons at Station Park before moving to Arbroath for the 2005-06 season. In January 2006, he moved, this time to Montrose. In January 2009, Davidson signed a contract extension until 2011. At the end of the 2010/11 season, Davidson announced his retirement from football.

== Career statistics ==
Club	Season	League		Cup		Lg Cup		Other		Total	
Club	Season	Apps	Goals	Apps	Goals	Apps	Goals	Apps	Goals	Apps	Goals
Dundee United	1999–00	23	0	3	0	3	1	0	0	29	1
Dundee United	2000–01	11	1	0	0	1	0	0	0	12	1
Dundee United	Total	34	1	3	0	4	1	0	0	41	2
Raith Rovers (loan)	2001–02	11	1	0	0	0	0	0	0	11	1
Raith Rovers (loan)	Total	11	1	0	0	0	0	0	0	11	1
Stirling Albion (loan)	2002–03	16	0	0	0	2	0	0	0	18	0
Stirling Albion (loan)	Total	16	0	0	0	2	0	0	0	18	0
Forfar Athletic	2003–04	34	3	2	0	3	0	3	1	42	4
Forfar Athletic	2004–05	18	0	0	0	0	0	0	0	18	0
Forfar Athletic	Total	52	3	2	0	3	0	3	1	60	4
Arbroath	2005–06	14	1	1	0	1	0	1	0	17	1
Arbroath	Total	14	1	1	0	1	0	1	0	17	1
Montrose	2005–06	15	1	0	0	0	0	0	0	15	1
Montrose	2006–07	25	0	1	0	1	0	0	0	27	0
Montrose	2007–08	25	0	1	0	2	0	4	0	32	0
Montrose	2008–09	22	2	1	0	1	0	0	0	24	2
Montrose	Total	87	3	3	0	4	0	4	0	98	3
Career total		214	9	9	0	14	1	8	1	245	11
