= Andy Roddie =

Scottish footballer

Personal information
- Full name: Andrew Robert Roddie
- Date of birth: 4 November 1971 (age 54)
- Place of birth: Glasgow, Scotland
- Position: Midfielder

Youth career
- Glasgow United

Senior career*
Years	Team	Apps	(Gls)
1988–1994	Aberdeen	27	(5)
1994–1997	Motherwell	55	(0)
1997	Panos Ljungskile SK	22	(2)
1997–1998	St Mirren	19	(1)
1998–1999	Yee Hope	30	(1)
1999	Carlisle United	2	(0)
1999	Clydebank	4	(0)
1999–2000	Stranraer	9	(3)
2000	Ross County	1	(0)
2000–2001	Yee Hope	30	(8)
2001	KR Reykjavik	9	(2)
2002	Partick Thistle	3	(0)
2002	Arbroath	4	(0)
2002–2004	Peterhead	58	(14)
2004–2005	Elgin City	26	(3)
2005–2008	Inverurie Locos	90	(22)
Total		380	(50)

International career
1992–1993	Scotland U21	5	(1)

Managerial career
- 2012–2016: Colony Park
- 2016–2017: Huntly
- 2020–2021: Keith
- * Club domestic league appearances and goals

Andrew Robert Roddie (born 4 November 1971) is a Scottish former footballer, who played in the Scottish Premier Division for Aberdeen and Motherwell. Most recently, he was manager of Keith in the Highland League.

== Career ==
Born and brought up in Glasgow, Roddie joined Aberdeen as a 16-year-old and spent seven years at Pittodrie before signing for Motherwell in 1994 under the management of former teammate Alex McLeish. Failing to score in two and a half seasons at the Lanarkshire club, Roddie left for Notts County and began a peripatetic career which took in Sweden, Hong Kong, Northern Ireland and Iceland as well as further spells in Scotland and England. He finished his career in the Highland League with Inverurie Loco Works.

After retirement, Roddie became involved in youth football in the North East of Scotland founding Kintore United. He joined the coaching staff at Colony Park in August 2012 as co-manager before assuming sole responsibility in January 2014.
