= Stephen McConalogue =

Scottish footballer

Personal information
- Date of birth: 16 June 1981 (age 45)
- Place of birth: Glasgow, Scotland
- Position: Striker

Team information
- Current team: Sutherland Sharks

Senior career*
Years	Team	Apps	(Gls)
1997–2003	Dundee United	40	(2)
2001	→ Greenock Morton (loan)	4	(0)
2002–2003	→ Clyde (loan)	15	(5)
2003–2004	Clyde	21	(7)
2004–2005	St Johnstone	9	(0)
2005–2007	Partick Thistle	60	(16)
2007–2008	Cowdenbeath	14	(2)
2008	→ Stranraer (loan)	14	(5)
2008–2009	Stranraer	34	(6)
2010–	Sutherland Sharks		
- * Club domestic league appearances and goals

Stephen McConalogue (born 16 June 1981) is a Scottish retired footballer who last played as a striker for Sutherland Sharks.

== Career ==
McConalogue began his career with Dundee United and made his debut on the final day of the 1998–99 season, appearing as a substitute in the 2–1 home defeat to Celtic. The following season, McConalogue featured in just under twenty matches, starting in most of the final matches of the season, he scored a hat-trick in a 2000 League Cup tie at the start of the following season and immediately signed a new three-year contract, scoring his first league goal a month later. further goals materialised and McConalogue had a loan spell with Greenock Morton in the early part of 2001.

In November 2001, McConalogue's first appearance for United in just under a year saw him net a last-minute equaliser in a league match away to Dunfermline Athletic but after another dozen appearances that season, McConalogue spent the entire 2002–03 season on loan to Clyde, scoring five goals. Following the end of his loan spell, McConalogue was allowed to leave Tannadice at the end of his contract under new manager Ian McCall and returned to Clyde for another year, scoring seven times. In 2004, McConalogue had a six-month spell with St Johnstone before arriving at Partick Thistle in January 2005, going on to be one of the main parts of the Thistle side which won promotion back to the First Division via the play-off final in May 2006. After two-and-a-half years at Firhill, McConalogue left the club and joined Cowdenbeath in July 2007, and after having a successful loan spell with Stranraer in January 2008 and having mutually agreed his release from Central Park at the end of the 2007–08 season, returned to Stair Park in June 2008 to sign a one-year deal, where he picked up player of the year. McConalogue in 2009 moved to Australia and has since retired from football.

McConalogue has been capped by Scotland from under-15 to under-21 level and remains Scotland's highest capped schoolboy internationalist, also holding the record for goals scored.

== Career statistics ==
After 21 June 2009

Club performance			League		Cup		League Cup		Total			
Season	Club	League	Apps	Goals	Apps	Goals	Apps	Goals	Apps	Goals		
Scotland			League		Scottish Cup		League Cup		Total			
1998–99	Dundee United	Scottish Premier League	1	0	-		-		1	0		
1999-00	Dundee United	Scottish Premier League	16	0	1	0	1	0	18	0		
2000–01	Dundee United	Scottish Premier League	11	1	-		3	3	14	4		
2000–01	Greenock Morton (loan)	Scottish First Division	4	0	-		-		4	0		
2001–02	Dundee United	Scottish Premier League	12	1	1	0	1	0	14	1		
2002–03	Clyde (loan)	Scottish First Division	15	5	2	0	1	0	18	5		
2003–04	Clyde	Scottish First Division	21	7	1	0	2	0	24	7		
2004–05	St Johnstone	Scottish First Division	9	0	-		-		9	0		
2004–05	Partick Thistle	Scottish First Division	11	4	-		-		11	4		
2005–06	Partick Thistle	Scottish Second Division	31	8	6	1	2	0	39	9		
2006–07	Partick Thistle	Scottish First Division	18	4	3	0	-		21	4		
2007–08	Cowdenbeath	Scottish Second Division	14	2	1	0	2	0	17	2		
2007–08	Stranraer (loan)	Scottish Third Division	16	3	-					-	16	5
2008–09	Stranraer	Scottish Second Division	34	6	-		-		34	6		
Career total			211	39	15	1	12	3	238	44		
