= Andy Gibson (footballer, born 1969) =

Scottish footballer

Personal information
- Date of birth: 2 February 1969 (age 57)
- Place of birth: Dechmont, Scotland
- Position: Midfielder

Youth career
- Gairdoch United

Senior career*
Years	Team	Apps	(Gls)
1987–1988	Stirling Albion	17	(1)
1988–1993	Aberdeen	8	(1)
1993	→ Stockport County (loan)		
1993–1996	Partick Thistle	44	(2)
1996–1998	Clyde	68	(6)
1998–1999	Forfar Athletic	9	(1)
1999–2001	Peterhead	26	(1)
Total		172	(12)
- * Club domestic league appearances and goals

Andy Gibson (born 2 February 1969) is a Scottish former footballer, who played for Stirling Albion, Aberdeen, Stockport County (on loan), Partick Thistle, Clyde, Forfar Athletic and Peterhead.
