= Theo ten Caat =

Dutch footballer

Personal information
- Full name: Pieter Theodoor ten Caat
- Date of birth: 8 December 1964 (age 61)
- Place of birth: Hollandscheveld, Netherlands
- Height: 5 ft 11 in (1.80 m)
- Position: Midfielder

Youth career
- SV HODO
- Hoogeveen
- Twente

Senior career*
Years	Team	Apps	(Gls)
1984–1987	Twente	80	(10)
1987–1988	Veendam	36	(16)
1988–1991	Groningen	76	(10)
1991–1994	Aberdeen	48	(5)
1994–1995	Vitesse	13	(2)
1995–1999	Twente	100	(8)
1999–2002	Veendam	60	(3)
Total		413	(54)
- * Club domestic league appearances and goals

Pieter Theodoor "Theo" ten Caat (born 8 December 1964) is a Dutch retired footballer who played as a midfielder for FC Twente, BV Veendam, FC Groningen, Aberdeen and Vitesse Arnhem.

== Club career ==
After nearly 200 matches in the Dutch league, Ten Caat moved abroad to play for Scottish side Aberdeen in 1991.

In 1999, Ten Caat returned to former club Veendam.

== Managerial career ==
Between 2004 and 2011 and again since summer 2016, Ten Caat works for the FC Twente youth academy and was coach at amateur sides WHC and Achilles '94. He also coached FC Klazienaveen and published his biography in 2025.

== Personal life ==
His brother Fred(dy) also played professionally, for Twente and Emmen.
