= 1996–97 Heart of Midlothian F.C. season =

Heart of Midlothian
1996–97 season
- Manager: Jim Jefferies
- Stadium: Tynecastle Stadium
- Scottish Premier Division: 4th
- Cup Winners' Cup: Qualifying round
- Scottish Cup: Fourth Round replay
- League Cup: Final
- Top goalscorer: League: John Robertson (14); All: John Robertson (19)
- Highest home attendance: 15,424 v Celtic Scottish Premier Division 11 January 1997
- Lowest home attendance: 9,303 v Stenhousemuir League Cup 14 August 1996
- Average home league attendance: 12,349

The 1996–97 season was Heart of Midlothian F.C.'s 14th consecutive season of play in the Scottish Premier Division. Hearts also competed in the Scottish Cup and the Scottish League Cup.

== Fixtures ==
=== Friendlies ===
19 July 1996 Friendly	Dundalk	1–3	Hearts	Oriel Park
	Goal		Colquhoun Robertson Cameron	Attendance: 200

21 July 1996 Friendly	Shamrock Rovers	1–1	Hearts
	Goal		Thomas	Attendance: 2,000

27 July 1996 Friendly	Berwick Rangers	0–5	Hearts	Shielfield Park
			McPherson Fulton Pointon Robertson Lawrence	Attendance: 1,159

31 July 1996 Friendly	Hearts	1–3	Porto	Tynecastle Stadium
	Thomas 73'		Jardel 36' (41) Edgar 85'	Attendance: 9,986; Referee: AW Waddell

3 August 1996 Friendly	Hearts	1–0	Southampton	Tynecastle Stadium
	Thomas 80'			Attendance: 8,542; Referee: I Taylor

27 March 1997 Friendly	Ross County	4–4	Hearts	Victoria Park
	Goal		McCann Weir	Attendance: 1,308

=== Cup winners' cup ===
8 August 1996 Uefa Cup Winners' Cup qualifying round	Red Star Belgrade	0–0	Hearts	Stadion FK Crvena Zvezda
				Attendance: 28,000

22 August 1996 Uefa Cup Winners' Cup qualifying round	Hearts	1–1	Red Star Belgrade	Tynecastle Stadium
	McPherson 44'		Marinovic 59'	Attendance: 15,062; Referee: Karl-Erik Nilsson

=== League Cup ===
14 August 1996 League Cup R2	Hearts	1–1 (a.e.t.) (5–4 p)	Stenhousemuir	Tynecastle Stadium
	McCann		Sprott 42' (pen.)	Attendance: 9,303; Referee: George Clyde

3 September 1996 League Cup R3	St Johnstone	1–3 (a.e.t.)	Hearts	McDiarmid Park
	O'Boyle 51'		Cameron 15' Beckford 105' Robertson 107'	Attendance: 6,806; Referee: Jim McCluskey

17 September 1996 League Cup QF	Hearts	1–0 (a.e.t.)	Celtic	Tynecastle Stadium
	Robertson 110'			Attendance: 14,442; Referee: Kenny Clark

23 October 1996 League Cup SF	Hearts	3–1	Dundee	Easter Road
	Beckford 20' Cameron 30' (pen.) Paille 60'		Hamilton 73'	Attendance: 15,653; Referee: Willie Young

24 November 1996 League Cup Final	Hearts	3–4	Rangers	Celtic Park
	Fulton 44' Robertson 59' Weir 88'		Alistair McCoist 11' (27), 66' Gascoigne 64'	Attendance: 48,559; Referee: Hugh Dallas

=== Scottish Cup ===
25 January 1997 Scottish Cup R3	Hearts	5–0	Cowdenbeath	Tynecastle Stadium
	Cameron 8' Weir 12' Robertson 22' (pen.), 63' Pointon 68'			Attendance: 11,485

16 February 1997 Scottish Cup R4	Hearts	1–1	Dundee United	Tynecastle Stadium
	Hamilton 81'		McManus 67' (og.)	Attendance: 14,833; Referee: Hugh Dallas

25 February 1997 Scottish Cup R4 Replay	Dundee United	1–0	Hearts	Tannadice Park
	Winters 5'			Attendance: 12,283; Referee: Hugh Dallas

=== Scottish Premier Division ===
17 August 1996 Scottish Premier Division	Hearts	3–2	Kilmarnock	Tynecastle Stadium
	Ritchie 12' (63) Weir 14'		Wright 43' Lauchlan 88'	Attendance: 10,854

25 August 1996 Scottish Premier Division	Aberdeen	4–0	Hearts	Pittodrie
	Joseph Miller 44' Dodds 53' Windass 76' Glass 84'			Attendance: 13,515; Referee: Jim Herald

7 September 1996 Scottish Premier Division	Hearts	1–0	Dundee United	Tynecastle Stadium
	Robertson 74' (pen.)			Attendance: 11,848

10 September 1996 Scottish Premier Division	Dunfermline Athletic	2–1	Hearts	Pittodrie
	Tod 54' Smith 62'		Weir 2'	Attendance: 7,787; Referee: Bobby Tait

14 September 1996 Scottish Premier Division	Rangers	3–0	Hearts	Ibrox
	Durie 40' Gascoigne 48' McCoist 81'			Attendance: 47,240; Referee: Gerry Evans

21 September 1996 Scottish Premier Division	Hearts	1–1	Motherwell	Tynecastle Stadium
	Weir 58'		Arnott 46'	Attendance: 10,932

28 September 1996 Scottish Premier Division	Hibs	1–3	Hearts	Easter Road
	Jackson 59' (pen.)		Cameron 19' (30) Robertson 40'	Attendance: 14,217

12 October 1996 Scottish Premier Division	Raith Rovers	1–1	Hearts	Stark's Park
	Thomson 70'		Robertson 2'	Attendance: 6,037

20 October 1996 Scottish Premier Division	Hearts	2–2	Celtic	Tynecastle Stadium
	Cameron 52' McPherson 90'		Van Hooijdonk 38' (51)	Attendance: 13,352; Referee: Jim McCluskey

26 October 1996 Scottish Premier Division	Dundee United	1–0	Hearts	Tannadice Park
	Winters 67'			Attendance: 9,393

2 November 1996 Scottish Premier Division	Hearts	2–0	Dunfermline Athletic	Tynecastle Stadium
	Weir 27' Cameron 44'			Attendance: 12,517

11 November 1996 Scottish Premier Division	Motherwell	0–2	Hearts	Fir Park
	Paille 54' Robertson 88'			Attendance: 5,441; Referee: G Alison

16 November 1996 Scottish Premier Division	Hearts	0–0	Hibs	Tynecastle Stadium
				Attendance: 15,129; Referee: John Rowbotham

30 November 1996 Scottish Premier Division	Celtic	2–2	Hearts	Celtic Park
	O'Neil 43' Di Canio 77' (pen.)		Cameron 31' McCann 64'	Attendance: 49,804; Referee: Stuart Dougal

7 December 1996 Scottish Premier Division	Hearts	0–0	Raith Rovers	Tynecastle Stadium
				Attendance: 1,719

11 December 1996 Scottish Premier Division	Hearts	1–2	Aberdeen	Tynecastle Stadium
	Cameron 7'		Shearer 75' Windass 78'	Attendance: 11,477

14 December 1996 Scottish Premier Division	Kilmarnock	2–0	Hearts	Rugby Park
	McKee 52' Mitchell 86'			Attendance: 5,832; Referee: Willie Young

21 December 1996 Scottish Premier Division	Hearts	1–4	Rangers	Tynecastle Stadium
	Robertson 57'		Robertson 23' Laudrup 48' Albertz 67' (pen.) Gascoigne 84'	Attendance: 15,139

26 December 1996 Scottish Premier Division	Dunfermline Athletic	2–3	Hearts	East End Park
	Fleming 25' Moore 68'		Mackay 57' Fulton 60' Robertson 80' (pen.)	Attendance: 9,736

28 December 1996 Scottish Premier Division	Hearts	4–1	Motherwell	Tynecastle Stadium
	Robertson 22' (pen.), 75' Weir 53' Hamilton 63'		Wright 43'	Attendance: 11,164; Referee: John Rowbotham

1 January 1997 Scottish Premier Division	Hibs	0–4	Hearts	Easter Road
			Robertson 33' Hamilton 62' (87) Cameron 65'	Attendance: 15,749

4 January 1997 Scottish Premier Division	Raith Rovers	1–2	Hearts	Stark's Park
	Lennon 1'		Robertson 5' Hamilton 72'	Attendance: 6,460

11 January 1997 Scottish Premier Division	Hearts	1–2	Celtic	Tynecastle Stadium
	Hamilton 38'		Cadete 28' (68)	Attendance: 15,424

18 January 1997 Scottish Premier Division	Hearts	1–2	Dundee United	Tynecastle Stadium
	Robertson 23'		Olafsson 14' McKinnon 82'	Attendance: 12,777

1 February 1997 Scottish Premier Division	Rangers	0–0	Hearts	Ibrox Park
				Attendance: 50,024

8 February 1997 Scottish Premier Division	Hearts	2–0	Kilmarnock	Tynecastle Stadium
	Ritchie 22' McCann 71'			Attendance: 11,020

10 February 1997 Scottish Premier Division	Aberdeen	0–0	Hearts	Pittodrie
				Attendance: 8,642; Referee: Stuart Dougal

22 February 1997 Scottish Premier Division	Hearts	3–2	Raith Rovers	Tynecastle Stadium
	Weir 24' McCann 35' (37)		Craig 4' Makela 41'	Attendance: 10,341

1 March 1997 Scottish Premier Division	Celtic	2–0	Hearts	Celtic Park
	Cadete 28' Di Canio 61'			Attendance: 49,578

15 March 1997 Scottish Premier Division	Hearts	1–0	Hibs	Tynecastle Stadium
	McCann 82'			Attendance: 15,136

22 March 1997 Scottish Premier Division	Motherwell	0–1	Hearts	Fir Park
			Paille 12'	Attendance: 6,245

5 April 1997 Scottish Premier Division	Kilmarnock	1–0	Hearts	Rugby Park
	Wright 5'			Attendance: 7,877

12 April 1997 Scottish Premier Division	Hearts	0–0	Aberdeen	Tynecastle Stadium
				Attendance: 11,186

19 April 1997 Scottish Premier Division	Hearts	1–1	Dunfermline Athletic	Tynecastle Stadium
	Robertson 90'		Young 27'	Attendance: 10,174; Referee: Bobby Tait

3 May 1997 Scottish Premier Division	Dundee United	1–0	Hearts	Tannadice Park
	McSwegan 72'			Attendance: 7,405

10 May 1997 Scottish Premier Division	Hearts	3–1	Rangers	Tynecastle Stadium
	Cameron 80' Robertson 82' (pen.), 86'		McInnes 81'	Attendance: 13,097; Referee: Jim McCluskey

== Scottish Premier Division table ==
Pos	Team	Pld	W	D	L	GF	GA	GD	Pts	Qualification or relegation
2	Celtic	36	23	6	7	78	32	+46	75	Qualification for the UEFA Cup first qualifying round (Note: As the League Cup winners Rangers had qualified for European competition via their league position, the place in the UEFA Cup was passed to the next highest placed team in the league, Dundee United.)
3	Dundee United	36	17	9	10	46	33	+13	60	Qualification for the UEFA Cup first qualifying round
4	Heart of Midlothian	36	14	10	12	46	43	+3	52	
5	Dunfermline Athletic	36	12	9	15	52	65	−13	45	
6	Aberdeen	36	10	14	12	45	54	−9	44	

Source: Soccerbase
Rules for classification: 1) Points; 2) Goal difference; 3) Goals scored

== Stats ==
=== Scorers ===
Pos	PLayer	SPL	SC	LC	CWC	Total
FW	(Scotland) John Robertson	14	2	3	0	19
MF	(Scotland) Colin Cameron	8	1	2	0	11
DF	(Scotland) David Weir	6	1	1	0	8
FW	(Scotland) Jim Hamilton	5	1	0	0	6
MF	(Scotland) Neil McCann	5	0	1	0	6
DF	(Scotland) Paul Ritchie	3	0	0	0	3
FW	(France) Stephane Paille	2	0	1	0	3
MF	(Scotland) Steve Fulton	1	0	1	0	2
DF	(Scotland) Dave McPherson	1	0	0	1	2
FW	(England) Darren Beckford	0	0	2	0	2
MF	(Scotland) Gary Mackay	1	0	0	0	1
DF	(England) Neil Pointon	0	1	0	0	1

== See also ==
- List of Heart of Midlothian F.C. seasons
