= 1996–97 Dundee United F.C. season =

Dundee United
1996–97 season
- Chairman: Jim McLean
- Manager: Billy Kirkwood (until 10 September); Tommy McLean (from 10 September)
- Stadium: Tannadice Park
- Premier Division: Third place
- Scottish Cup: Semi-finals
- League Cup: Third round
- Top goalscorer: League: Kjell Olofsson (12); All: Kjell Olofsson (13)
- Highest home attendance: 12,600 vs. Celtic, Premier Division, 1 February 1997
- Lowest home attendance: 6,387 (vs Raith Rovers, Premier Division, 22 March 1997
Home colours	Away colours

The 1996–97 season was the 88th year of football played by Dundee United, and covered the period from 1 July 1996 to 30 June 1997. United finished in third place in the league following their promotion from the First Division and qualified for the UEFA Cup in the process. The club lost in the semi-finals of the Scottish Cup after a replay and were knocked out of the League Cup in a third round penalty shootout by rivals Dundee.

== Summary ==
United finished the Scottish Premier Division 1996–97 season in third place with 60 points, in the first season back in the top flight after the single season in the First Division. Despite taking just one point from the first six games, United finished third, with the appointment of Tommy McLean starting an immediate six-game unbeaten run, bettered later by a thirteen-game unbeaten succession, which included eight straight league wins.

Dundee United played a total of 44 competitive matches during the 1996–97 season. The team finished third in the Premier Division.

The cup campaigns saw a 3rd round League Cup penalty shootout defeat to rivals Dundee and a semi-final Scottish Cup defeat (after a replay) to eventual winners Kilmarnock.

Off the pitch, United started a four-year successive run of 'Premier League Programme of the Year'.

The club signed twelve players during the season with approximately £650k spent on transfer fees. In addition, three players were promoted from youth contracts: Paul Black, Craig Easton, Steven Thompson, with all three featuring at least once during the season.

Ten players left the club during the season, with the club receiving over £1.35m in transfer sales, representing an overall transfer profit of around £700k.

The jerseys were sponsored for the first time by Telewest.

== Fixtures and results ==
All results are written with Dundee United's score first.

=== Scottish Premier Division ===
Date	Opponent	Venue	Result	Attendance	Scorers
10 August 1996	Motherwell	H	1–1	8,127	McSwegan
17 August 1996	Hibernian	H	0–1	8,589	
24 August 1996	Rangers	A	0–1	48,285	
7 September 1996	Heart of Midlothian	A	0–1	11,858	
14 September 1996	Celtic	H	1–2	12,152	McSwegan
21 September 1996	Raith Rovers	A	2–3	5,077	McSwegan, Hannah
28 September 1996	Aberdeen	H	1–0	10,359	McSwegan
12 October 1996	Kilmarnock	H	0–0	7,365	
19 October 1996	Dunfermline Athletic	A	1–1	6,982	Winters
26 October 1996	Heart of Midlothian	H	1–0	9,353	Winters
2 November 1996	Motherwell	A	3–1	5,814	Olofsson, McKinnon, Winters
16 November 1996	Aberdeen	A	3–3	13,800	McLaren, Winters, Olofsson
23 November 1996	Raith Rovers	H	1–2	8,028	Duffy
30 November 1996	Dunfermline Athletic	H	1–1	7,646	Winters
7 December 1996	Kilmarnock	A	2–0	5,814	Olofsson (2)
10 December 1996	Rangers	H	1–0	12,529	Gough
14 December 1996	Hibernian	A	1–1	8,250	McLaren
21 December 1996	Celtic	A	0–1	46,590	
26 December 1996	Motherwell	H	2–0	8,072	McSwegan, Hannah
28 December 1996	Raith Rovers	A	1–0	5,762	Olofsson
1 January 1997	Aberdeen	H	4–0	9,736	Winters, Pressley (2), Olofsson
4 January 1997	Kilmarnock	H	2–0	8,508	Malpas, McKinnon
11 January 1997	Dunfermline Athletic	A	3–1	7,698	Olofsson (2), McInally
18 January 1997	Heart of Midlothian	A	2–1	12,777	Olofsson, McKinnon
1 February 1997	Celtic	H	1–0	12,600	McSwegan
8 February 1997	Hibernian	H	0–0	9,219	
22 February 1997	Kilmarnock	A	3–2	6,054	McKinnon (3)
1 March 1997	Dunfermline Athletic	H	2–1	8,160	McLaren, Olofsson
12 March 1997	Rangers	A	2–0	49,192	Winters, Olofsson
15 March 1997	Aberdeen	A	1–1	13,645	Olofsson
22 March 1997	Raith Rovers	H	2–1	6,387	Winters (2)
5 April 1997	Hibernian	A	0–2	11,010	
19 April 1997	Motherwell	A	1–1	5,500	Zetterlund
3 May 1997	Heart of Midlothian	H	1–0	7,405	McSwegan
7 May 1997	Rangers	H	0–1	12,180	
10 May 1997	Celtic	A	0–3	46,758	

=== Scottish Cup ===
Date	Round	Opponent	Venue	Result	Attendance	Scorers
25 January 1997	Third round	Stirling Albion	A	2–0	3,300	Winters, McSwegan
16 February 1997	Fourth round	Heart of Midlothian	A	1–1	14,833	McManus
25 February 1997	Fourth round replay	Heart of Midlothian	H	1–0	12,283	Winters
8 March 1997	Quarter–finals	Motherwell	H	4–1	12,283	McLaren (2), Winters, Olofsson
14 April 1997	Semi–finals	Kilmarnock	N	0–0	12,391	
22 April 1997	Semi–finals replay	Kilmarnock	N	0–1	9,225	

=== Scottish League Cup ===
Date	Opponent	Venue	Result	Attendance	Scorers	
13 August 1996	Second round	Stirling Albion	A	2–1	1,683	Winters, Coyle
3 September 1996	Third round	Dundee	H	2–2	11,839	Coyle, McSwegan

Dundee beat United 4–3 on penalty kicks

== Player statistics ==
During the 1996–97 season, United used 31 different players comprising five nationalities. The table below shows the number of appearances and goals scored by each player.

No.	Pos	Nat	Player	Total		Premier Division		Scottish Cup		League Cup	
No.	Pos	Nat	Player	Apps	Goals	Apps	Goals	Apps	Goals	Apps	Goals
	GK	(Netherlands) NED	Sieb Dykstra	28	0	22	0	6	0	0	0
	GK	(England) ENG	Lance Key	3	0	3	0	0	0	0	0
	GK	(Scotland) SCO	Ally Maxwell	12	0	10	0	0	0	2	0
	DF	(Netherlands) NED	Armand Benneker	9	0	7	0	0	0	2	0
	DF	(Scotland) SCO	Neil Duffy	17	1	13	1	2	0	2	0
	DF	(Scotland) SCO	Stewart McKimmie	7	0	6	0	1	0	0	0
	DF	(Scotland) SCO	Jamie McQuilken	11	0	9	0	0	0	2	0
	DF	(Scotland) SCO	Maurice Malpas	32	1	26	1	6	0	0	0
	DF	(Norway) NOR	Erik Pedersen	31	0	25	0	6	0	0	0
	DF	(Scotland) SCO	Mark Perry	43	0	35	0	6	0	2	0
	DF	(Scotland) SCO	Steven Pressley	43	2	36	2	5	0	2	0
	DF	(Scotland) SCO	Rab Shannon	10	0	9	0	0	0	1	0
	MF	(Scotland) SCO	Paul Black	1	0	1	0	0	0	0	0
	MF	(Scotland) SCO	Dave Bowman	30	0	27	0	1	0	2	0
	MF	(Scotland) SCO	Jamie Dolan	19	0	13	0	6	0	0	0
	MF	(Scotland) SCO	Craig Easton	2	0	2	0	0	0	0	0
	MF	(Scotland) SCO	David Hannah	11	2	11	2	0	0	0	0
	MF	(Scotland) SCO	Grant Johnson	9	0	8	0	0	0	1	0
	MF	(Scotland) SCO	Jim McInally	20	1	16	1	4	0	0	0
	MF	(Scotland) SCO	Ray McKinnon	31	6	24	6	5	0	2	0
	MF	(Scotland) SCO	Andy McLaren	41	6	34	4	6	2	1	0
	MF	(Scotland) SCO	Sandy Robertson	4	0	4	0	0	0	0	0
	MF	(Scotland) SCO	David Sinclair	8	0	6	0	2	0	0	0
	MF	(Scotland) SCO	Paul Walker	4	0	3	0	1	0	0	0
	MF	(Sweden) SWE	Jonas Wirmola	3	0	3	0	0	0	0	0
	MF	(Sweden) SWE	Lars Zetterlund	32	0	25	0	1	0	6	0
	FW	(Republic of Ireland) IRL	Owen Coyle	11	2	9	0	0	0	2	2
	FW	(Scotland) SCO	Gary McSwegan	38	9	30	7	6	1	2	1
	FW	(Sweden) SWE	Kjell Olofsson	31	13	25	12	6	1	0	0
	FW	(Scotland) SCO	Steven Thompson	1	0	1	0	0	0	0	0
	FW	(Scotland) SCO	Robbie Winters	43	12	36	8	5	3	2	1

=== Goalscorers ===
United had 12 players score with the team scoring 58 goals in total. The top goalscorer was Kjell Olofsson, who finished the season with 13 goals.

Name	League	Cups	Total
Kjell Olofsson	12	1	13
Robbie Winters	8	4	12
Gary McSwegan	7	2	9
Ray McKinnon	6		6
Andy McLaren	3	2	5
Own goal	2	1	3
David Hannah	2		2
Steven Pressley	2		2
Owen Coyle		2	2
Neil Duffy	1		1
Jim McInally	1		1
Maurice Malpas	1		1
Lars Zetterlund	1		1

=== Discipline ===
United had three players sent off and seventeen players received at least one caution. In total, the team received three red cards and

Name	Cautions	Dismissals
Dave Bowman	(yellow card) 4	(red card) 1
Stewart McKimmie	(yellow card) 1	(red card) 1
Steven Pressley		(red card) 1
Ray McKinnon	(yellow card) 7	
Mark Perry	(yellow card) 4	
Lars Zetterlund	(yellow card) 4	
Erik Pedersen	(yellow card) 3	
Armand Benneker	(yellow card) 2	
Jamie Dolan	(yellow card) 2	
Jim McInally	(yellow card) 2	
Andy McLaren	(yellow card) 2	
Gary McSwegan	(yellow card) 2	
Sieb Dykstra	(yellow card) 1	
Craig Easton	(yellow card) 1	
Grant Johnson	(yellow card) 1	
Maurice Malpas	(yellow card) 1	
Kjell Olofsson	(yellow card) 1	
Jonas Wirmola	(yellow card) 1	

Note: disciplinary statistics are missing for Coca-Cola match vs Dundee and Scottish Cup matches vs Kilmarnock

== Competitions ==
=== League table ===
Pos	Team	Pld	W	D	L	GF	GA	GD	Pts	Qualification or relegation
1	Rangers (C)	36	25	5	6	85	33	+52	80	Qualification for the Champions League first qualifying round
2	Celtic	36	23	6	7	78	32	+46	75	Qualification for the UEFA Cup first qualifying round (Note: As the League Cup winners Rangers had qualified for European competition via their league position, the place in the UEFA Cup was passed to the next highest placed team in the league, Dundee United.)
3	Dundee United	36	17	9	10	46	33	+13	60	Qualification for the UEFA Cup first qualifying round
4	Heart of Midlothian	36	14	10	12	46	43	+3	52	
5	Dunfermline Athletic	36	12	9	15	52	65	−13	45	

Source: Soccerbase
Rules for classification: 1) Points; 2) Goal difference; 3) Goals scored
(C) Champions

== Transfers ==
=== In ===
Date	Player	From	Fee
26 July 1996	(England) Lance Key	(England) Sheffield Wednesday	Free
1 August 1996	(Scotland) Neil Duffy	(Scotland) Dundee	Unknown
1 August 1996	(Netherlands) Armand Benneker	(Netherlands) MVV Maastricht	Free
3 October 1996	(Scotland) Jim McInally	(Scotland) Raith Rovers	Unknown
30 October 1996	(Sweden) Lars Zetterlund	(Sweden) Örebro SK	£100,000
1 November 1996	(Sweden) Kjell Olofsson	(Sweden) Moss FK	£400,000
1 November 1996	(Norway) Erik Pedersen	(Norway) Viking	Unknown
4 December 1996	(Netherlands) Sieb Dijkstra	(England) Queen's Park Rangers	£50,000
7 January 1997	(Scotland) Jamie Dolan	(Scotland) Motherwell	Swap
1 January 1997	(Sweden) Jonas Wirmola	(Sweden) Malmö FF	Loan
31 January 1997	(Scotland) David Sinclair	(England) Millwall	£90,000
19 March 1997	(Scotland) Stewart McKimmie	(Scotland) Aberdeen	Free

=== Out ===
Date	Player	To	Fee
1 July 1996	(Scotland) Craig Brewster	(Greece) Ionikos	Free
7 August 1996	(Scotland) Brian Welsh	(Scotland) Hibernian	£200,000
12 August 1996	(Scotland) Christian Dailly	(England) Derby County	£500,000
6 September 1996	(Republic of Ireland) Kelham O'Hanlon	(England) Preston North End	£30,000
20 October 1996	(Scotland) Rab Shannon	(Scotland) Hibernian	Unknown
28 December 1996	(Scotland) David Hannah	(Scotland) Celtic	£650,000
7 January 1997	(Republic of Ireland) Owen Coyle	(Scotland) Motherwell	Swap
19 January 1997	(Scotland) Scott Crabbe	(Scotland) Falkirk	Unknown
14 March 1997	(England) Lance Key	(England) Sheffield United	Free
