= 1996–97 Celtic F.C. season =

Celtic
1996–97 season
- Chairman: Fergus McCann
- Manager: Tommy Burns (until 2 May); Billy Stark (caretaker)
- Ground: Celtic Park; Glasgow, Scotland (capacity: 60,355)
- Scottish Premier Division: 2nd
- Scottish Cup: Semi-finals
- Scottish League Cup: Quarter-finals
- UEFA Cup: First round
- Top goalscorer: League: Jorge Cadete (25); All: Jorge Cadete (33)
Home colours	Away colours

The 1996-97 season was the 103rd season of competitive football by Celtic.

Celtic finished the League second to Rangers same as the previous season; despite getting more points than their rivals against the rest of the teams in the league, they lost all four Old Firm derbies to end five points off the Govan club, equaling Celtic's 1966-74 record of nine-in-a-row league titles.

Manager and former player Tommy Burns was sacked shortly after losing the Scottish Cup semi-final to Falkirk, and Billy Stark finished the season as caretaker. It was the second season in a row with no major honours for the Glasgow club, and the ninth in a row in which they failed to win the League.

== Pre-season and friendlies ==
Win Draw Loss Postponed

23 July 1996 Friendly	VV Reünie	0–16	Celtic	Borculo, Netherlands
19:00 CEST		Match Report	Cadete 21', 22', 55', 61', 72', 85'; Hooijdonk 11', 49' (pen.), 63', 68'; Di Canio 48', 60', 76', 87'; McLaughlin 15'; Thom 87'	Stadium: Sportcomplex De Wildbaan; Referee: J. Floors

24 July 2014 Friendly	GSV Gouda	0–8	Celtic	Gouda, Netherlands
19:00 CEST		Match Report	Donnelly 29'; Thom 33'; Wieghorst 36'; Cadete 66'; Grant 67'; McLaughlin 76'; Hooijdonk 80', 89'	Referee: Mario van Der Ende

26 July 2014 Friendly	V.V. Veere	1–9	Celtic	Veere, Netherlands
19:00 CEST	Gladdines 47'	Match Report	Hooijdonk 2'; O'Donnell 9', 10'; Cadete; McLaughlin; Thom 89'; Hooijdonk 2'	Stadium: Sportpark Bieweg; Referee: W Vermeulen

27 July 1996 Friendly	SC Halsteren	0–3	Celtic	Halesteren, Netherlands
19:00 GMT		Match Report	van Hooijdonk 8'; Stubbs 14'; van Hooijdonk 60' (pen.)	Stadium: Sportpark De Beek; Attendance: Unknown; Referee: M. Koopman

29 July 1996 Friendly	Berkum Thuis	1–8	Celtic	Zwolle, Netherlands
19:45 GMT	Kouwen 19'	Match Report	Di Canio 5'; Thom 16'; Di Canio 27'; Thom 35'; Cadete 46'; Di Canio 60'; Thom 63'; Hughes 86'	Stadium: Sportpark De Vegtlust; Attendance: Unknown; Referee: B. Slot

31 July 1996 Friendly	Celtic	2–1	Arsenal	Glasgow, Scotland
19:45 GMT	Donnelly 83'; O'Donnell 89'	Match Report	Dixon 25'	Stadium: Celtic Park; Attendance: 47,300; Referee: R. Tait

3 August 1996 Friendly	Celtic	2–2	Sporting CP	Glasgow, Scotland
15:00 GMT	Cadete 40'; Donnelly 60'	Match Report	Filipe 80' Hughes 82' (o.g.)	Stadium: Celtic Park; Attendance: 42,400; Referee: Kenny Clark

26 November 1996 Friendly	Celtic	0–1	Barcelona	Glasgow, Scotland
19:45 GMT		Match Report	Óscar García 20'	Stadium: Celtic Park; Attendance: 26,623; Referee: J McCluskey

== Season summary ==
Once again, the season saw a very close title race between the two Old Firm teams. Celtic consistently remained second, only topping the table for a few days at the start of November, but stayed hot on the heels of Rangers, usually only being a couple of points behind them, and sometimes only by goal difference. However, points dropped on consecutive weekends in late November and early December saw the gap increase. Both sides endured turbulent runs of form in March, the pressure of the "Nine In A Row" - one seeking to achieve it, the other stopping it - telling. Following a 1-0 victory at Celtic Park during the final meeting of the two that season Rangers pulled decisively ahead in the title race, and this led to the dismissal of manager Tommy Burns three games before the end of the season.

== Competitions ==
=== Scottish Premier Division ===
==== League table ====
Pos	Team	Pld	W	D	L	GF	GA	GD	Pts	Qualification or relegation
1	Rangers (C)	36	25	5	6	85	33	+52	80	Qualification for the Champions League first qualifying round
2	Celtic	36	23	6	7	78	32	+46	75	Qualification for the UEFA Cup first qualifying round (Note: As the League Cup winners Rangers had qualified for European competition via their league position, the place in the UEFA Cup was passed to the next highest placed team in the league, Dundee United.)
3	Dundee United	36	17	9	10	46	33	+13	60	Qualification for the UEFA Cup first qualifying round
4	Heart of Midlothian	36	14	10	12	46	43	+3	52	
5	Dunfermline Athletic	36	12	9	15	52	65	−13	45	

Source: Soccerbase
Rules for classification: 1) Points; 2) Goal difference; 3) Goals scored
(C) Champions

==== Results by round ====
Round	1	2	3	4	5	6	7	8	9	10	11	12	13	14	15	16	17	18	19	20	21	22	23	24	25	26	27	28	29	30	31	32	33	34	35	36
Ground	A	H	A	H	A	H	A	H	A	A	H	H	H	A	H	A	H	A	H	H	A	A	H	A	A	H	A	H	A	A	A	A	H	A	H	H
Result	D	W	W	W	W	W	L	W	D	W	W	L	D	L	W	W	W	L	W	W	W	W	W	W	L	W	W	W	L	L	D	D	W	W	D	W
Position	4	2	2	2	2	2	2	2	2	2	1	2	2	2	2	2	2	2	2	2	2	2	2	2	2	2	2	2	2	2	2	2	2	2	2	2

Source: Competitive matches
A = Away; H = Home; W = Win; D = Draw; L = Loss

==== Matches ====
10 August 1996 Premier League	Aberdeen	2–2	Celtic	Aberdeen
15:00 GMT	Windass 74' (pen.); Shearer 80'	Match Report	van Hooijdonk 28'; Thom 90'	Stadium: Pittodrie Stadium; Attendance: 18,500; Referee: Hugh Dallas

17 August 1996 Premier League	Celtic	4–1	Raith Rovers	Glasgow
15:00 GMT	van Hooijdonk 16'; Thom 25' 50'; Donnelly 87'	Match Report	Duffield 67'	Stadium: Celtic Park; Attendance: 47,200; Referee: Sandy Roy

24 August 1996 Premier League	Kilmarnock	1–3	Celtic	Kilmarnock
15:00 GMT	Reilly 27'	Match Report	Di Canio 61'; Thom 64'; Cadete 89'	Stadium: Rugby Park; Attendance: 15,900; Referee: Ian Taylor

7 September 1996 Premier League	Celtic	5–0	Hibernian	Glasgow
15:00 GMT	McGinlay 4' (o.g.); Cadete 14' 45'; O'Neil 51'; van Hooijdonk 72'	Match Report		Stadium: Celtic Park; Attendance: 47,042; Referee: J Rowbotham

14 September 1996 Premier League	Dundee United	1–2	Celtic	Dundee, Scotland
15:00 GMT	McSwegan 87'	Match Report	van Hooijdonk 45'; Malky MacKay 90'	Stadium: Tannadice Park; Attendance: 12,152; Referee: W Crombie

21 September 1996 Premier League	Celtic	5–1	Dunfermline Athletic	Glasgow
15:00 GMT	Cadete 32'; Di Canio 35' 41'; van Hooijdonk 72' 89'	Match Report	Britton 65'	Stadium: Celtic Park; Attendance: 50,032; Referee: Clyde

28 September 1996 Premier League	Rangers	2–0	Celtic	Glasgow, Scotland
15:00 GMT	Gough 51'; Gascoigne 89'	Match Report		Stadium: Ibrox Stadium; Attendance: 50,124; Referee: W Young

12 October 1996 Premier League	Celtic	1–0	Motherwell	Glasgow
15:00 GMT	van Hooijdonk 90'	Match Report		Stadium: Celtic Park; Attendance: 49,422; Referee: R Orr

20 September 1996 Premier League	Heart of Midlothian	2–2	Celtic	Edinburgh, Scotland
15:00 GMT		Match Report		Stadium: Tynecastle Stadium; Attendance: 13,352

26 September 1996 Premier League	Hibernian	0–4	Celtic	Edinburgh, Scotland
15:00 GMT		Report		Stadium: Easter Road Stadium; Attendance: 13,930

2 November 1996 Premier League	Celtic	1–0	Aberdeen	Glasgow
15:00 GMT		Match Report		Stadium: Celtic Park; Attendance: 50,124

14 November 1996 Premier League	Celtic	0–1	Rangers	Glasgow
15:00 GMT		Match Report	Laudrup 8'	Stadium: Celtic Park; Attendance: 50,009

30 November 1996 Premier League	Celtic	2–2	Hearts	Glasgow
15:00 GMT		Match Report		Stadium: Celtic Park; Attendance: 49,804

7 December 1996 Premier League	Motherwell	2–1	Celtic	Motherwell, Scotland
15:00 GMT		Report		Stadium: Fir Park; Attendance: 11,589

21 December 1996 Premier League	Celtic	1–0	Dundee United	Glasgow
15:00 GMT		Match Report		Stadium: Celtic Park; Attendance: 46,483

26 December 1996 Premier League	Aberdeen	1–2	Celtic	Aberdeen, Scotland
15:00 GMT		Report		Stadium: Pittodrie Stadium; Attendance: 16,748

28 December 1996 Premier League	Celtic	4–2	Dunfermline Athletic	Glasgow
15:00 GMT		Match Report		Stadium: Celtic Park; Attendance: 45,751

2 January 1997 Premier League	Rangers	3–1	Celtic	Glasgow
15:00 GMT				Stadium: Ibrox Stadium; Attendance: 50,019

4 January 1997 Premier League	Celtic	5–0	Motherwell	Glasgow
15:00 GMT				Stadium: Celtic Park; Attendance: 45,259

8 January 1997 Premier League	Celtic	6–0	Kilmarnock	Glasgow
19:45 GMT				Stadium: Celtic Park; Attendance: 45,535

11 January 1997 Premier League	Heart of Midlothian	1–2	Celtic	Edinburgh
15:00 GMT				Stadium: Tynecastle Park; Attendance: 15,424

14 January 1997 Premier League	Raith Rovers	1–2	Celtic	Kirkcaldy
19:45 GMT				Stadium: Stark's Park; Attendance: 8,544

18 January 1997 Premier League	Celtic	4–1	Hibernian	Glasgow
15:00 GMT				Stadium: Celtic Park; Attendance: 48,986

29 January 1997 Premier League	Dunfermline Athletic	0–2	Celtic	Dunfermline
19:45 GMT				Stadium: East End Park; Attendance: 17,919

1 February 1997 Premier League	Dundee United	1–0	Celtic	Dundee
15:00 GMT				Stadium: Tannadice Park; Attendance: 12,483

6 February 1997 Premier League	Celtic	2–0	Raith Rovers	Glasgow
19:45 GMT				Stadium: Celtic Park; Attendance: 44,770

22 February 1997 Premier League	Motherwell	0–1	Celtic	Motherwell
15:00 GMT				Stadium: Fir Park; Attendance: 12,131

1 March 1997 Premier League	Celtic	2–0	Heart of Midlothian	Glasgow
15:00 GMT				Stadium: Celtic Park; Attendance: 49,578

11 March 1997 Premier League	Kilmarnock	2–0	Celtic	Kilmarnock
19:45 GMT				Stadium: Rugby Park; Attendance: 15,087

16 March 1997 Premier League	Celtic	0–1	Rangers	Glasgow
15:00 GMT				Stadium: Celtic Park; Attendance: 49,733

22 March 1997 Premier League	Dunfermline Athletic	2–2	Celtic	Dunfermline
15:00 GMT				Stadium: East End Park; Attendance: 13,092

5 April 1997 Premier League	Raith Rovers	1–1	Celtic	Kirkcaldy
15:00 GMT				Stadium: Stark's Park; Attendance: 7,914

20 April 1997 Premier League	Celtic	3–0	Aberdeen	Glasgow
15:00 GMT				Stadium: Celtic Park; Attendance: 46,989

4 May 1997 Premier League	Hibernian	1–3	Celtic	Edinburgh
15:00 GMT				Stadium: Easter Road; Attendance: 10,546

7 May 1997 Premier League	Celtic	0–0	Kilmarnock	Glasgow
19:45 GMT				Stadium: Celtic Park; Attendance: 42,788

10 May 1997 Premier League	Celtic	3–0	Dundee United	Glasgow
15:00 GMT				Stadium: Celtic Park; Attendance: 46,742

=== Scottish League Cup ===
13 August 1996 Second round	Clyde	1–3	Celtic	Cumbernauld
20:00 GMT	Brown 74'	Report	Cadete 11' 67'; Thom 87'	Stadium: Broadwood Stadium; Attendance: 8,000; Referee: J Fleming

4 September 1996 Third round	Alloa Athletic	1–5	Celtic	Alloa
20:00 GMT	McAneney 48'	Report	Thom 41'; Cadete 51' 62' 72'; Hooijdonk 54' (pen.)	Stadium: Recreation Park, Alloa; Attendance: 12,582; Referee: S Dougal

17 September 1996 Quarter Finals	Heart of Midlothian	1–0 (a.e.t.)	Celtic	Edinburgh
20:00 GMT	Robertson 110'	Report		Stadium: Tynecastle Stadium; Attendance: 14,442; Referee: K Clark

=== Scottish Cup ===
26 January 1997 Third round	Clydebank	0–5	Celtic	Glasgow
20:00 GMT		Report		Stadium: Firhill Park; Attendance: 16,285; Referee: J Rowbotham

17 February 1997 Fourth round	Hibernian	1–1	Celtic	Edinburgh
20:00 GMT		Report		Stadium: Easter Road; Attendance: 16,000; Referee: W Young

26 February 1997 Fourth round replay	Celtic	2–0	Hibernian	Glasgow
20:00 GMT		Report		Stadium: Celtic Park; Attendance: 46,424; Referee: W Young

6 March 1997 Quarter-finals	Celtic	2–0	Rangers	Glasgow
20:00 GMT		Report		Stadium: Celtic Park; Attendance: 49,519; Referee: J McCluskey

12 April 1997 Semi-finals	Celtic	1–1	Falkirk	Glasgow
20:00 GMT		Report		Stadium: Ibrox Stadium; Attendance: 45,261; Referee: Willie Young

23 April 1997 Semi-final replay	Falkirk	1–0	Celtic	Glasgow
20:00 GMT		Report		Stadium: Ibrox Stadium; Attendance: 35,879; Referee: Willie Young

=== UEFA Cup ===
6 August 1996 Qualifying round 1st leg	Košice (Slovakia)	0–0	(Scotland) Celtic	Košice
20:00 GMT		Report		Stadium: Štadión Lokomotívy v Čermeli; Attendance: 16,000; Referee: Konrad Plautz

20 August 1996 Qualifying round 2nd leg	Celtic (Scotland)	1–0 (1–0 agg.)	(Slovakia) Košice	Glasgow
20:00 GMT	Cadete 88'	Report		Stadium: Celtic Park; Attendance: 44,448; Referee: J Hireiniemi

10 September 1996 First round 1st leg	Celtic (Scotland)	0–2	(Germany) Hamburger SV	Glasgow
20:00 GMT		Report	Baron 2'; Schupp 71'	Stadium: Celtic Park; Attendance: 45,400; Referee: Pierluigi Collina

24 September 1996 First round2nd leg	Hamburger SV (Germany)	2–0 (4–0 agg.)	(Scotland) Celtic	Hamburg
19:45 GMT	Baron 24'; Breitenreiter 50'	Report		Stadium: Volksparkstadion; Attendance: 29.600; Referee: V Schuk

== Statistics ==
=== Disciplinary record ===
Includes all competitive matches. Players listed below made at least one appearance for Celtic first squad during the season.

N	P	Nat.	Name	League			Europe			League Cup			Scottish Cup			Total			Notes
N	P	Nat.	Name	Yellow card	Second yellow card	Red card	Yellow card	Second yellow card	Red card	Yellow card	Second yellow card	Red card	Yellow card	Second yellow card	Red card	Yellow card	Second yellow card	Red card	Notes
5	DF	(England)	Alan Stubbs										3			3			
17	MF	(Denmark)	Morten Wieghorst																
1	GK	(Scotland)	Gordon Marshall																
18	DF	(Scotland)	Malky Mackay				1	1								1	1		
5	DF	(England)	Stuart Gray																
5	DF	(Italy)	Enrico Annoni										1			1			
10	FW	(Scotland)	Phil O'Donnell																
11	FW	(Scotland)	Simon Donnelly																
16	DF	(Scotland)	John Hughes				1	1		1						2	1		
2	DF	(Scotland)	Tom Boyd							1						1			
9	FW	(Netherlands)	Pierre Van Hooijdonk							1						1			
7	MF	(Italy)	Paolo Di Canio							1			1			2			
11	FW	(Portugal)	Jorge Cadete																
14	MF	(Scotland)	Brian O'Neil																
3	DF	(Scotland)	Tosh McKinlay										1			1			
33	DF	(Scotland)	Peter Grant							1	1					1	1		
4	DF	(Scotland)	Jackie McNamara										1			1			
42	MF	(Scotland)	Paul McStay																
42	MF	(Scotland)	Brian McLaughlin																
10	FW	(Germany)	Andreas Thom							1						1			

Last updated: 22 July 2014
Source: Competitive matches
Ordered by (red card) , (second yellow card) and (yellow card)
(yellow card) = Number of bookings; (second yellow card) = Number of sending offs after a second yellow card; (red card) = Number of sending offs by a direct red card.

== Transfers ==
=== Transfers in ===
No.	Pos.	Nat.	Name	Age	EU	Moving from	Type	Transfer window	Ends	Transfer fee	Source
7	FW	(Italy)	Paolo Di Canio	28	EU	AC Milan (Italy)	Transfer	Summer	1998	£3,000,000	
6	DF	(England)	Alan Stubbs	24	EU	Bolton Wanderers (England)	Transfer	Summer	1998	£4,000,000	
16	MF	(Scotland)	David Hannah	23	EU	Dundee United (Scotland)	Transfer	Summer	1998	£650,000	
17	DF	(Italy)	Enrico Annoni	30	EU	Roma (Italy)	Transfer	Winter	1999	£300,000	Source
33	DF	(Northern Ireland)	John Convery	16	EU	Glenavon (Northern Ireland)	Transfer	Winter	1998	Free	Source
12	FW	(England)	Tommy Johnson	26	EU	Aston Villa (England)	Transfer	Winter	1998	£2,400,000	

Total spending: ▼£8.85 million

=== Players out ===
No.	Pos.	Nat.	Name	Age	EU	Moving to	Type	Transfer window	Transfer fee	Source
1	DF	(Scotland)	Mike Galloway	31	EU		Retirement	Summer	Free	Source
4	DF	(Albania)	Rudi Vata	27	EU	Apollon Limassol (Greece)	Transfer	Summer	Free	Source
11	MF	(Scotland)	John Collins	28	EU	A.S. Monaco (France)	Transfer	Summer	Bosman	Source
2	DF	(England)	Lee Martin	28	EU	Bristol Rovers (England)	Transfer	Summer	Free	Source
	DF	(Scotland)	John Hughes	32	EU	Hibernian (Scotland)	Transfer	Mid-Season	£250,000	
	MF	(Republic of Ireland)	Declan Boyle	22	EU	Derry City (Republic of Ireland)	Transfer	Winter	£20,000	Source
9	FW	(Netherlands)	Pierre Van Hooijdonk	27	EU	Nottingham Forest (England)	Transfer	Mid-Season	£3,000,000	

Total income: ▲£3.22 million

== See also ==
- List of Celtic F.C. seasons
