= 1994–95 Dundee United F.C. season =

Dundee United
1994–95 season
- Chairman: Jim McLean
- Manager: Ivan Golac (until March 14); Billy Kirkwood (from March 28)
- Stadium: Tannadice Park
- Premier Division: Tenth place (Relegated)
- Scottish Cup: Quarter-finals
- League Cup: Quarter-finals
- Cup Winners' Cup: First round
- Top goalscorer: League: Craig Brewster (7); All: Jerren Nixon (9)
- Highest home attendance: 10,845 vs. Celtic, Premier Division, 13 May 1995
- Lowest home attendance: 6,457 vs. Falkirk, Premier Division, 21 February 1995
Home colours	Away colours

The 1994–95 season was the 86th year of football played by Dundee United, and covers the period from July 1, 1994, to June 30, 1995. United finished in bottom place and were relegated to the First Division, their first spell outside the Premier Division since its inception in 1975.

== Summary ==
United were relegated, the season after winning the Scottish Cup for the first time. Ivan Golac, the man who led them to the trophy, was sacked in March and replaced with Billy Kirkwood. Kirkwood's record was less than impressive and losing nine of the final eleven games meant relegation.

Dundee United played a total of 45 competitive matches during the 1994–95 season. The team finished tenth (bottom) in the Premier Division and were relegated.

In the cup competitions, United lost in the quarter-finals of the Scottish Cup to Heart of Midlothian and lost narrowly in the League Cup quarter-finals to Celtic.

The club signed four players during the season and one at the end, for next season. Approximately £600k was spent on transfer fees. Five players were sold by the club during the season, with the club raising at least £750k in transfer sales, representing a small overall transfer profit.

The club's playing kits were sponsored by Rover Group for the first time in a two-year deal. The deal began in time for the Cup Final at the end of the previous season.

Celtic, who relegated United on the final day by beating them, actually scored the lowest number of league goals that season (39). United scored 40.

== Results and fixtures ==
All results are written with Dundee United's score first.

=== Scottish Premier Division ===
Date	Opponent	Venue	Result	Attendance	Scorers
13 August	Hibernian	A	0–5	8,849	
20 August	Celtic	A	1–2	25,817	Nixon
27 August	Aberdeen	H	2–1	9,295	Welsh, Brewster
10 September	Motherwell	H	1–1	7,440	Ristic
17 September	Heart of Midlothian	A	1–2	7,392	Nixon
24 September	Falkirk	H	1–0	6,899	Petrić
1 October	Rangers	A	0–2	43,330	
8 October	Kilmarnock	A	2–0	7,179	Welsh, Ristic
15 October	Partick Thistle	H	0–1	6,687	
22 October	Hibernian	H	0–0	7,983	
29 October	Aberdeen	A	0–3	11,744	
5 November	Celtic	H	2–2	10,393	Brewster, Dailly
8 November	Motherwell	A	1–1	6,136	Brewster
19 November	Heart of Midlothian	H	5–2	7,717	Johnson, Brewster, McKinlay, Dailly (2)
26 November	Falkirk	A	3–1	5,933	Brewster, Nixon, McKinlay
4 December	Rangers	H	0–3	10,692	
26 December	Kilmarnock	H	2–2	8,468	Hannah, Winters
31 December	Hibernian	A	0–4	7,763	
2 January	Aberdeen	H	0–0	10,580	
7 January	Celtic	A	1–1	21,429	Cleland
14 January	Heart of Midlothian	A	0–2	8,656	
21 January	Motherwell	H	6–1	7,062	McKinlay (2), Brewster, Dailly, Nixon (2)
4 February	Rangers	A	1–1	44,197	Nixon
21 February	Falkirk	H	1–0	6,457	Malpas
25 February	Partick Thistle	H	2–0	7,227	Brewster, Gomes
4 March	Kilmarnock	A	0–2	7,630	
7 March	Partick Thistle	A	0–2	2,627	
18 March	Motherwell	A	1–2	4,457	Malpas
21 March	Heart of Midlothian	H	1–1	6,862	Gomes
1 April	Rangers	H	0–2	10,842	
8 April	Falkirk	A	1–3	5,894	Gomes
15 April	Kilmarnock	H	1–2	8,723	Petrić
18 April	Partick Thistle	A	3–1	5,262	Welsh (2), Hannah
29 April	Hibernian	H	0–1	8,376	
6 May	Aberdeen	A	1–2	21,364	Winters
13 May	Celtic	H	0–1	10,845	

=== Scottish Cup ===
Date	Round	Opponent	Venue	Result	Attendance	Scorers
28 January 1995	Third round	Clyde	H	0–0	7,413	
7 February 1995	Third round replay	Clyde	A	5–1	5,387	Hannah, Bowman, McKinlay, Craig, Nixon
18 February 1995	Fourth round	Huntly	A	3–1	4,500	Brewster, Malpas, Hannah
12 March 1995	Quarter–finals	Heart of Midlothian	A	1–2	12,515	Gomes

=== Scottish League Cup ===
Date	Round	Opponent	Venue	Result	Attendance	Scorers
16 August 1994	Second round	St Mirren	A	1–0	3,470	Ristic
31 August 1994	Third round	Hamilton Academical	A	2–2	2,180	Hannah (2)
21 September 1994	Quarter–finals	Celtic	A	0–1	28,859	

United beat Hamilton 5–3 on penalty kicks

=== UEFA Cup Winners' Cup ===
Date	Round	Opponent	Venue	Result	Attendance	Scorers
15 September 1994	First round 1st leg	(Slovakia) Tatran Prešov	H	3–2	9,454	Petric, Nixon, Hannah
29 September 1994	First round 2nd leg	(Slovakia) Tatran Prešov	A	1–3	8,184	McKinlay

== Player statistics ==
During the 1994–95 season, United used 25 different players comprising five nationalities. The table below shows the number of appearances and goals scored by each player.

No.	Pos	Nat	Player	Total		Premier Division		Scottish Cup		League Cup		Cup Winners' Cup	
No.	Pos	Nat	Player	Apps	Goals	Apps	Goals	Apps	Goals	Apps	Goals	Apps	Goals
	GK	(Denmark) DEN	Henrik Jørgensen	3	0	2	0	0	0	1	0	0	0
	GK	(Scotland) SCO	Alan Main	10	0	6	0	0	0	2	0	2	0
	GK	(Republic of Ireland) IRL	Kelham O'Hanlon	33	0	31	0	2	0	0	0	0	0
	DF	(Scotland) SCO	Gary Bollan	8	0	7	0	0	0	1	0	0	0
	DF	(Scotland) SCO	Alex Cleland	21	1	18	1	0	0	2	0	1	0
	DF	(Scotland) SCO	David Craig	8	1	6	0	1	1	0	0	1	0
	DF	(Scotland) SCO	Maurice Malpas	38	3	31	2	4	1	1	0	2	0
	DF	(Scotland) SCO	Mark Perry	11	0	9	0	1	0	1	0	0	0
	DF	(Federal Republic of Yugoslavia) YUG	Gordan Petrić	42	3	33	2	4	0	3	0	2	1
	DF	(Scotland) SCO	Brian Welsh	35	4	28	4	3	0	2	0	2	0
	MF	(Scotland) SCO	Dave Bowman	38	1	31	0	4	1	2	0	1	0
	MF	(Uruguay) URU	Juan Ferreri	1	0	1	0	0	0	0	0	0	0
	MF	(Scotland) SCO	David Hannah	41	7	32	2	4	2	3	2	2	1
	MF	(Scotland) SCO	Grant Johnson	13	1	13	1	0	0	0	0	0	0
	MF	(Scotland) SCO	Jim McInally	33	0	25	0	3	0	3	0	2	0
	MF	(Scotland) SCO	Billy McKinlay	34	5	26	4	4	1	2	0	2	0
	MF	(Scotland) SCO	Andy McLaren	22	0	19	0	0	0	1	0	2	0
	MF	(Wales) WAL	Andy Moule	1	0	1	0	0	0	0	0	0	0
	MF	(England) ENG	Chris Myers	3	0	1	0	0	0	2	0	0	0
	MF	(Trinidad and Tobago) TTO	Jerren Nixon	37	9	28	6	4	1	3	0	2	2
	MF	(Federal Republic of Yugoslavia) YUG	Dragutin Ristić	17	3	10	2	3	0	3	1	1	0
	FW	(Scotland) SCO	Craig Brewster	35	8	27	7	3	1	3	0	2	0
	FW	(Scotland) SCO	Paddy Connolly	8	0	6	0	0	0	2	0	0	0
	FW	(Scotland) SCO	Scott Crabbe	10	0	9	0	1	0	0	0	0	0
	FW	(Scotland) SCO	Christian Dailly	40	4	33	4	4	0	1	0	2	0
	FW	(Brazil) BRA	Sérgio Gomes	16	4	14	3	2	1	0	0	0	0
	FW	(Scotland) SCO	Robbie Winters	12	2	12	2	0	0	0	0	0	0

=== Goalscorers ===
United had 15 players score with the team scoring 56 goals in total. The top goalscorer was Jerren Nixon, who finished the season with 9 goals.

Name	League	Cups	Total
Jerren Nixon	6	3	9
Craig Brewster	7	1	8
David Hannah	2	5	7
Billy McKinlay	4	1	5
Christian Dailly	4	0	4
Brian Welsh	4	0	4
Sergio Gomes	3	1	4
Maurice Malpas	2	1	3
Gordan Petric	2	1	3
Dragutin Ristic	2	1	3
Robbie Winters	2	0	2
Alex Cleland	1	0	1
Grant Johnson	1	0	1
Dave Bowman	0	1	1
David Craig	0	1	1

=== Discipline ===
Full disciplinary statistics are unavailable.

Name	Dismissals
Alex Cleland	(red card) 1

== Competitions ==
=== League table ===
Pos	Team	Pld	W	D	L	GF	GA	GD	Pts	Qualification or relegation
6	Heart of Midlothian	36	12	7	17	44	51	−7	43	
7	Kilmarnock	36	11	10	15	40	48	−8	43	
8	Partick Thistle	36	10	13	13	40	50	−10	43	Qualification for the Intertoto Cup group stage (Note: Partick Thistle qualified for the 1995 UEFA Intertoto Cup as the highest ranked Scottish club to apply for a place in the competition.)
9	Aberdeen (O)	36	10	11	15	43	46	−3	41	Qualification for the Play-off
10	Dundee United (R)	36	9	9	18	40	56	−16	36	Relegation to the 1995–96 Scottish First Division

Updated to match(es) played on end of season. Source: Soccerbase
Rules for classification: 1) Points; 2) Goal difference; 3) Goals scored
(O) Play-off winners; (R) Relegated

== Transfers ==
=== In ===
Date	Player	From	Fee
July 1994	(Denmark) Henrik Jørgensen	(Denmark) Viborg FF	Unknown
July 1994	(Federal Republic of Yugoslavia) Dragutin Ristić	(Scotland) Falkirk	£50,000
1 August 1994	(Scotland) David Craig	(Scotland) East Stirlingshire	Unknown
14 September 1994	(Republic of Ireland) Kelham O'Hanlon	(England) Preston North End	£30,000
January 1995	(Uruguay) Juan Ferreri	(Uruguay) Defensor Sporting	Unknown
20 January 1995	(Brazil) Sérgio Gomes	(Portugal) Amora	£300,000

=== Out ===
Date	Player	To	Fee
4 August 1994	(Scotland) John O'Neil	(Scotland) Forfar Athletic	Unknown
5 January 1995	(Scotland) Alan Main	(Scotland) St Johnstone	Unknown
21 January 1995	(Netherlands) Guido van de Kamp	(Scotland) Dunfermline Athletic	Unknown
27 January 1995	(Scotland) Gary Bollan	(Scotland) Rangers	£750,000*
27 January 1995	(Scotland) Alex Cleland	(Scotland) Rangers	£750,000*

* Cleland and Bollan were sold in a joint £750k deal

== See also ==
- 1994–95 in Scottish football
