= 1994–95 Heart of Midlothian F.C. season =

Heart of Midlothian
1994–95 season
- Manager: Tommy McLean
- Stadium: Tynecastle Stadium
- Scottish Premier Division: 6th
- Scottish Cup: Semi-final
- League Cup: Third round
- Top goalscorer: League: John Robertson (10); All: John Robertson (14)
- Highest home attendance: 12,630 v Hibs Scottish Premier Division 18 January 1995
- Lowest home attendance: 7,392 v Dundee United Scottish Premier Division 17 September 1994
- Average home league attendance: 10,123

The 1994–95 season was Heart of Midlothian F.C.'s 12th consecutive season of play in the Scottish Premier Division. Hearts also competed in the Scottish Cup and the Scottish League Cup.

== Fixtures ==
=== Friendlies ===
30 July 1994 Friendly	Clachnacuddin	0–5	Hearts
			Johnston Colquhoun Robertson (pen.) Hogg	Attendance: 550

31 July 1994 Friendly	Forres Mechanics	1–9	Hearts
	Goal		Johnston Colquhoun Johnston Robertson Millar Frail	Attendance: 1,000

4 August 1994 Friendly	Morton	1–3	Hearts
	Goal		Robertson Frail Leitch	Attendance: 500

6 August 1994 Friendly	Middlesbrough	3–1	Hearts
	Goal		Robertson (pen.)	Attendance: 11,591

9 August 1994 Friendly	Raith Rovers	2–0	Hearts
	Goal			Attendance: 2,172

14 December 1994 Friendly	West Ham United	1–0	Hearts
	Goal			Attendance: 1,200

=== League Cup ===
16 August 1994 League Cup R2	Dumbarton	0–4	Hearts	Boghead Park
			Millar 20' Robertson 44' Johnston 53' (69)	Attendance: 1,412; Referee: Eric Martindale

31 August 1994 League Cup R2	Hearts	2–4	St Johnstone	Tynecastle Stadium
	Colquhoun 2' Locke 31'		O'Neil 46' Miller 67' O'Boyle 79' Irons	Attendance: 8,467; Referee: Kenny Clark

=== Scottish Cup ===
1 February 1995 Scottish Cup R3	Clydebank	1–1	Hearts	New Kilbowie
	Eadie 33'		Robertson 30' (pen.)	Attendance: 3,606; Referee: Hugh Williamson

7 February 1995 Scottish Cup R3 Replay	Hearts	2–1	Clydebank	Tynecastle Stadium
	Robertson 9' Thomas 65'		Eadie 90'	Attendance: 8,503; Referee: Hugh Williamson

20 February 1995 Scottish Cup R4	Hearts	4–2	Rangers	Tynecastle Stadium
	Miller 22' McPherson 45' Robertson 58' Thomas 89'		Laudrup 46' Durie 57'	Attendance: 12,375; Referee: Willie Young

12 March 1995 Scottish Cup QF	Hearts	2–1	Dundee United	Tynecastle Stadium
	Millar 21'		Gomes 4'	Attendance: 12,515; Referee: W Crombie

8 April 1995 Scottish Cup SF	Hearts	0–1	Airdrieonians	Hampden Park
			Cooper 29'	Attendance: 22,538

=== Scottish Premier Division ===
13 August 1994 Scottish Premier Division	Aberdeen	3–1	Hearts	Pittodrie
	Robertson 29'; Dodds 58'; Booth 74'		Colquhoun 53'	Attendance: 14,238

20 August 1994 Scottish Premier Division	Motherwell	1–1	Hearts	Fir Park
	Coyne 79' (pen.)		Johnston 56'	Attendance: 8,249

27 August 1994 Scottish Premier Division	Hearts	0–1	Hibs	Tynecastle Stadium
			Hunter 61'	Attendance: 12,371

11 September 1994 Scottish Premier Division	Rangers	3–0	Hearts	Ibrox Stadium
	Hateley 59' (pen.), 71'; Durie 76'			Attendance: 40,653

17 September 1994 Scottish Premier Division	Hearts	2–1	Dundee United	Tynecastle Stadium
	Thomas 22'; Frail 39'		Nixon 47'	Attendance: 7,392

24 September 1994 Scottish Premier Division	Hearts	3–0	Kilmarnock	Tynecastle Stadium
	Millar 12'; McLaren 19'; Mackay 76'			Attendance: 9,302

1 October 1994 Scottish Premier Division	Falkirk	2–1	Hearts	Brockville Park
	McLaughlin 22'; McAvennie 69'		Robertson 19'	Attendance: 7,589

8 October 1994 Scottish Premier Division	Partick Thistle	0–1	Hearts	Firhill Stadium
			Robertson 25'	Attendance: 5,076; Referee: Jim Herald

15 October 1994 Scottish Premier Division	Hearts	1–0	Celtic	Tynecastle Stadium
	Robertson 42'			Attendance: 12,086

22 October 1994 Scottish Premier Division	Hearts	2–0	Aberdeen	Tynecastle Stadium
	Frail 12'; Robertson 41'			Attendance: 10,655

29 October 1994 Scottish Premier Division	Hibs	2–1	Hearts	Easter Road
	Jackson 13'; O'Neill 15'		Robertson 80' (pen.)	Attendance: 13,622; Referee: Hugh Williamson

5 November 1994 Scottish Premier Division	Hearts	1–2	Motherwell	Tynecastle Stadium
	Robertson 40'		Shannon 30'; Coyne 46'	Attendance: 8,889; Referee: Alan Freeland

9 November 1994 Scottish Premier Division	Hearts	1–1	Rangers	Tynecastle Stadium
	Colquhoun 67'		Hateley 49' (pen.)	Attendance: 12,347; Referee: Hugh Dallas

19 November 1994 Scottish Premier Division	Dundee United	5–2	Hearts	Tannadice Park
	Johnson 5'; Brewster 15'; McKinlay 19'; Dailly 45'		Thomas 4', 70'	Attendance: 7,719

26 November 1994 Scottish Premier Division	Kilmarnock	3–1	Hearts	Rugby Park
	Mitchell 60'; McKee 70'; Skilling 87'		Robertson 30'	Attendance: 8,069

3 December 1994 Scottish Premier Division	Hearts	1–1	Falkirk	Tynecastle Stadium
	Thomas 22'		McDonald 42'	Attendance: 8,960

26 December 1994 Scottish Premier Division	Hearts	3–0	Partick Thistle	Tynecastle Stadium
	Hagen 55'; Robertson 80'; Bett 88'			Attendance: 8,920; Referee: AM Roy

31 December 1994 Scottish Premier Division	Aberdeen	3–1	Hearts	Pittodrie
	Shearer 13' (52); Inglis 28'		Thomas 66'	Attendance: 11,392

8 January 1995 Scottish Premier Division	Motherwell	1–2	Hearts	Fir Park
	McGrillen 32'		Hamilton 17'; Miller 80'	Attendance: 5,117; Referee: Louis Thow

11 January 1995 Scottish Premier Division	Celtic	1–1	Hearts	Celtic Park
	Bett 58' (pen.)		Van Hooijdonk 12'	Attendance: 26,491; Referee: Hugh Dallas

14 January 1995 Scottish Premier Division	Hearts	2–0	Dundee United	Tynecastle Stadium
	Millar 45'; Jamieson 73'			Attendance: 8,656

18 January 1995 Scottish Premier Division	Hearts	2–0	Hibs	Tynecastle Stadium
	McPherson 37'; Millar 82'			Attendance: 12,630; Referee: AW Waddell

21 January 1995 Scottish Premier Division	Rangers	1–0	Hearts	Ibrox Stadium
	Miller 1'			Attendance: 44,231

4 February 1995 Scottish Premier Division	Falkirk	2–0	Hearts	Brockville Park
	Fulton 29'; Henderson 87'			Attendance: 6,028

11 February 1995 Scottish Premier Division	Hearts	2–2	Kilmarnock	Tynecastle Stadium
	Millar 29'; Mackay 31'		Maskrey 5' (18)	Attendance: 8,374

25 February 1995 Scottish Premier Division	Hearts	1–1	Celtic	Tynecastle Stadium
	Jamieson 89'		O'Donnell 52'	Attendance: 11,185

4 March 1995 Scottish Premier Division	Partick Thistle	0–0	Hearts	Firhill Stadium

18 March 1995 Scottish Premier Division	Hearts	2–1	Rangers	Tynecastle Stadium
	Robertson 9'; Millar 30'		Laudrup 44'	Attendance: 9,806

21 March 1995 Scottish Premier Division	Dundee United	1–1	Hearts	Tannadice Park
	Gomes 67'		Johnston 28'	Attendance: 6,862; Referee: M Pocock

1 April 1995 Scottish Premier Division	Hearts	0–1	Falkirk	Tynecastle Stadium
			McGrillen 41'	Attendance: 9,003

4 April 1995 Scottish Premier Division	Partick Thistle	3–1	Hearts	Firhill Stadium
	Pittman 63'; McDonald 73'; McWilliams 81'		Millar 6'	Attendance: 4,526; Referee: Jim McCluskey

12 April 1995 Scottish Premier Division	Kilmarnock	3–2	Hearts	Rugby Park
	Anderson 1'; Henry 16'; Whitworth 60'		Cramb 26'; Jamieson 85'	Attendance: 7,239; Referee: Eric Martindale

15 April 1995 Scottish Premier Division	Hearts	0–1	Partick Thistle	Tynecastle Stadium
			Dinnie 54'	Attendance: 9,007

19 April 1995 Scottish Premier Division	Celtic	0–1	Hearts	Hampden Park
			Hagen 86'	Attendance: 18,638; Referee: W Clark

29 April 1995 Scottish Premier Division	Hearts	1–2	Aberdeen	Tynecastle Stadium
	McPherson 64'		Dodds 61' (pen.), 85'	Attendance: 11,466

6 May 1995 Scottish Premier Division	Hibs	3–1	Hearts	Easter Road
	Weir 62'; Wright 65'; Harper 69'		Hagen 34'	Attendance: 7,122

13 May 1995 Scottish Premier Division	Hearts	2–0	Motherwell	Tynecastle Stadium
	Hamilton 51'; Robertson 89' (pen.)			Attendance: 11,172

== League table ==
Pos	Team	Pld	W	D	L	GF	GA	GD	Pts	Qualification or relegation
4	Celtic	36	11	18	7	39	33	+6	51	Qualification for the Cup Winners' Cup first round (Note: Celtic qualified for the 1995–96 UEFA Cup Winners' Cup by winning the 1994–95 Scottish Cup.)
5	Falkirk	36	12	12	12	48	47	+1	48	
6	Heart of Midlothian	36	12	7	17	44	51	−7	43	
7	Kilmarnock	36	11	10	15	40	48	−8	43	
8	Partick Thistle	36	10	13	13	40	50	−10	43	Qualification for the Intertoto Cup group stage (Note: Partick Thistle qualified for the 1995 UEFA Intertoto Cup as the highest ranked Scottish club to apply for a place in the competition.)

Updated to match(es) played on end of season. Source: Soccerbase
Rules for classification: 1) Points; 2) Goal difference; 3) Goals scored

== Stats ==
=== Scorers ===
Pos	PLayer	SPL	SC	LC	Total
FW	(Scotland) John Robertson	10	3	1	14
MF	(Scotland) John Millar	6	2	1	9
FW	(Scotland) Kevin Thomas	5	2	0	7
MF	(Scotland) David Hagen	3	0	0	3
MF	(Scotland) Willie Jamieson	3	0	0	3
DF	(Scotland) Dave McPherson	2	1	0	3
MF	(Scotland) John Colquhoun	2	0	1	3
MF	(Scotland) Allan Johnston	1	0	2	3
MF	(Scotland) Stephen Frail	2	0	0	2
MF	(Scotland) Jim Bett	2	0	0	2
MF	(Scotland) Brian Hamilton	2	0	0	2
MF	(Scotland) Gary Mackay	2	0	0	2
DF	(Canada) Colin Miller	1	1	0	2
FW	(Scotland) Maurice Johnston	1	0	0	1
FW	(Scotland) Colin Cramb	1	0	0	1
DF	(Scotland) Alan McLaren	1	0	0	1
MF	(Scotland) Gary Locke	0	0	1	1

== See also ==
- List of Heart of Midlothian F.C. seasons
