= Neil Caldwell =

Neil Caldwell may refer to:

- Neil Caldwell (footballer) (born 1975), Scottish footballer
- Neil Caldwell (politician) (born 1929), American politician in Texas
