= Sergio Gómez =

Sergio Gómez may refer to:

- Sergio Gómez (singer) (1973–2007), Mexican singer
- Sergio Gómez (footballer, born 1981), Argentine football manager and former midfielder
- Sergio Gómez (footballer, born 1991), Spanish football defensive midfielder
- Sergio Gómez (footballer, born 2000), Spanish football offensive midfielder

== See also ==
- Sérgio Gomes (born 1969), Brazilian football striker
- Sergi Gómez (born 1992), Spanish football centre back
