= 1996–97 in Scottish football =

Premier League champions
- Rangers

Division One champions
- St Johnstone

Division Two champions
- Ayr United

Division Three champions
- Inverness CT

Scottish Cup winners
- Kilmarnock

League Cup winners
- Rangers

Challenge Cup winners
- Stranraer

Junior Cup winners
- Pollok

Teams in Europe
- Aberdeen, Celtic, Heart of Midlothian, Rangers

Scotland national team
- 1998 World Cup qualification
- ← 1995–96 1997–98 →

The 1996–97 season was the 100th season of competitive football in Scotland. This season saw a playoff system introduced between the second bottom club in the Premier Division and the second-top club in Division One.

== Scottish Premier Division ==
| Pos | Team | Pld | W | D | L | GF | GA | GD | Pts | Qualification or relegation |
|---|---|---|---|---|---|---|---|---|---|---|
| 1 | Rangers (C) | 36 | 25 | 5 | 6 | 85 | 33 | +52 | 80 | Qualification for the Champions League first qualifying round |
| 2 | Celtic | 36 | 23 | 6 | 7 | 78 | 32 | +46 | 75 | Qualification for the UEFA Cup first qualifying round (Note: As the League Cup winners Rangers had qualified for European competition via their league position, the place in the UEFA Cup was passed to the next highest placed team in the league, Dundee United.) |
| 3 | Dundee United | 36 | 17 | 9 | 10 | 46 | 33 | +13 | 60 | Qualification for the UEFA Cup first qualifying round |
| 4 | Heart of Midlothian | 36 | 14 | 10 | 12 | 46 | 43 | +3 | 52 | |
| 5 | Dunfermline Athletic | 36 | 12 | 9 | 15 | 52 | 65 | −13 | 45 | |
| 6 | Aberdeen | 36 | 10 | 14 | 12 | 45 | 54 | −9 | 44 | |
| 7 | Kilmarnock | 36 | 11 | 6 | 19 | 41 | 61 | −20 | 39 | Qualification for the Cup Winners' Cup qualifying round (Note: Kilmarnock qualified for the Cup Winners' Cup as the winners of the Scottish Cup.) |
| 8 | Motherwell | 36 | 9 | 11 | 16 | 44 | 55 | −11 | 38 | |
| 9 | Hibernian (O) | 36 | 9 | 11 | 16 | 38 | 55 | −17 | 38 | Qualification for the Play-off |
| 10 | Raith Rovers (R) | 36 | 6 | 7 | 23 | 29 | 73 | −44 | 25 | Relegation to the First Division |

Source: Soccerbase
Rules for classification: 1) Points; 2) Goal difference; 3) Goals scored
(C) Champions; (O) Play-off winners; (R) Relegated
Notes:

Champions: Rangers
Relegated: Raith Rovers

=== Premier Division/Division One playoff ===
- Hibernian 1–0 Airdrieonians
- Airdrieonians 2–4 Hibernian

(Hibernian win 5–2 on aggregate)

== Scottish League Division One ==
| Pos | Team | Pld | W | D | L | GF | GA | GD | Pts | Promotion or relegation |
|---|---|---|---|---|---|---|---|---|---|---|
| 1 | St Johnstone (C, P) | 36 | 24 | 8 | 4 | 74 | 23 | +51 | 80 | Promotion to the Premier Division |
| 2 | Airdrieonians | 36 | 15 | 15 | 6 | 56 | 34 | +22 | 60 | Qualification for the Play-off |
| 3 | Dundee | 36 | 15 | 13 | 8 | 47 | 33 | +14 | 58 | |
| 4 | St Mirren | 36 | 17 | 7 | 12 | 48 | 41 | +7 | 58 | |
| 5 | Falkirk | 36 | 15 | 9 | 12 | 42 | 39 | +3 | 54 | |
| 6 | Partick Thistle | 36 | 12 | 12 | 12 | 49 | 48 | +1 | 48 | |
| 7 | Stirling Albion | 36 | 12 | 10 | 14 | 54 | 61 | −7 | 46 | |
| 8 | Morton | 36 | 12 | 9 | 15 | 42 | 41 | +1 | 45 | |
| 9 | Clydebank (R) | 36 | 7 | 7 | 22 | 31 | 59 | −28 | 28 | Relegation to the Second Division |
| 10 | East Fife (R) | 36 | 2 | 8 | 26 | 28 | 92 | −64 | 14 | Relegation to the Second Division |

Source: RSSSF
Rules for classification: 1) points; 2) goal difference; 3) number of goals scored.
(C) Champions; (P) Promoted; (R) Relegated

Promoted: St. Johnstone
Relegated: Clydebank, East Fife

== Scottish League Division Two ==
| Pos | Team | Pld | W | D | L | GF | GA | GD | Pts | Promotion or relegation |
|---|---|---|---|---|---|---|---|---|---|---|
| 1 | Ayr United (C, P) | 36 | 23 | 8 | 5 | 61 | 33 | +28 | 77 | Promotion to the First Division |
| 2 | Hamilton Academical (P) | 36 | 22 | 8 | 6 | 75 | 28 | +47 | 74 | Promotion to the First Division |
| 3 | Livingston | 36 | 18 | 10 | 8 | 56 | 38 | +18 | 64 | |
| 4 | Clyde | 36 | 14 | 10 | 12 | 42 | 39 | +3 | 52 | |
| 5 | Queen of the South | 36 | 13 | 8 | 15 | 55 | 57 | −2 | 47 | |
| 6 | Stenhousemuir | 36 | 11 | 11 | 14 | 49 | 43 | +6 | 44 | |
| 7 | Brechin City | 36 | 10 | 11 | 15 | 36 | 49 | −13 | 41 | |
| 8 | Stranraer | 36 | 9 | 9 | 18 | 29 | 51 | −22 | 36 | |
| 9 | Dumbarton (R) | 36 | 9 | 8 | 19 | 44 | 66 | −22 | 35 | Relegation to the Third Division |
| 10 | Berwick Rangers (R) | 36 | 4 | 11 | 21 | 32 | 75 | −43 | 23 | Relegation to the Third Division |

Source: "1996-1997 Second Division - SPFL Archive". SPFL.
Rules for classification: 1) points; 2) goal difference; 3) number of goals scored.
(C) Champions; (P) Promoted; (R) Relegated

Promoted: Ayr United, Hamilton Academical
Relegated: Dumbarton, Berwick Rangers

== Scottish League Division Three ==
| Pos | Team | Pld | W | D | L | GF | GA | GD | Pts | Promotion |
|---|---|---|---|---|---|---|---|---|---|---|
| 1 | Inverness Caledonian Thistle (C, P) | 36 | 23 | 7 | 6 | 70 | 37 | +33 | 76 | Promotion to the Second Division |
| 2 | Forfar Athletic (P) | 36 | 19 | 10 | 7 | 74 | 45 | +29 | 67 | Promotion to the Second Division |
| 3 | Ross County | 36 | 20 | 7 | 9 | 58 | 41 | +17 | 67 | |
| 4 | Alloa Athletic | 36 | 16 | 7 | 13 | 50 | 47 | +3 | 55 | |
| 5 | Albion Rovers | 36 | 13 | 10 | 13 | 50 | 47 | +3 | 49 | |
| 6 | Montrose | 36 | 12 | 7 | 17 | 46 | 62 | −16 | 43 | |
| 7 | Cowdenbeath | 36 | 10 | 9 | 17 | 38 | 51 | −13 | 39 | |
| 8 | Queen's Park | 36 | 9 | 9 | 18 | 46 | 59 | −13 | 36 | |
| 9 | East Stirlingshire | 36 | 8 | 9 | 19 | 36 | 58 | −22 | 33 | |
| 10 | Arbroath | 36 | 6 | 13 | 17 | 31 | 52 | −21 | 31 | |

Source: Soccerway
Rules for classification: 1) points; 2) goal difference; 3) number of goals scored.
(C) Champions; (P) Promoted

Promoted: Inverness CT, Forfar Athletic

== Other honours ==
=== Cup honours ===
| Competition | Winner | Score | Runner-up | Report |
|---|---|---|---|---|
| Scottish Cup 1996–97 | Kilmarnock | 1 – 0 | Falkirk | Wikipedia article |
| League Cup 1996–97 | Rangers | 4 – 3 | Heart of Midlothian | Wikipedia article |
| Challenge Cup 1996–97 | Stranraer | 1 – 0 | St Johnstone | Wikipedia article |
| Youth Cup | Celtic | 3 – 2 | Rangers | |
| Junior Cup | Pollok | 3 – 1 | Tayport | |

=== Individual honours ===
==== SPFA awards ====
| Award | Winner | Club |
|---|---|---|
| Players' Player of the Year | (Italy) Paolo di Canio | Celtic |
| Young Player of the Year | (Scotland) Robbie Winters | Dundee United |

==== SFWA awards ====
| Award | Winner | Club |
|---|---|---|
| Footballer of the Year | (Denmark) Brian Laudrup | Rangers |
| Young Player of the Year | (Scotland) Alex Burke | Kilmarnock |
| Manager of the Year | (Scotland) Walter Smith | Rangers |

== Scottish clubs in Europe ==
| Club | Competition(s) | Final round | Coef. |
|---|---|---|---|
| Rangers | UEFA Champions League | Group stage | 5.00 |
| Heart of Midlothian | UEFA Cup Winners' Cup | Qualifying round | 1.00 |
| Aberdeen | UEFA Europa League | Second round | 5.00 |
| Celtic | UEFA Europa League | First round | 1.50 |

Average coefficient – 3.125

== Scotland national team ==
| Date | Venue | Opponents | Score | Competition | Scotland scorer(s) |
|---|---|---|---|---|---|
| 31 August 1996 | Ernst-Happel-Stadion, Vienna (A) | Austria | 0–0 | WCQG4 | |
| 5 October 1996 | Daugava Stadium, Riga (A) | Latvia | 2–0 | WCQG4 | John Collins, Darren Jackson |
| 10 November 1996 | Ibrox Stadium, Glasgow (H) | Sweden | 1–0 | WCQG4 | John McGinlay |
| 11 February 1997 | Stade Louis II, Monaco (A) | Estonia | 0–0 | WCQG4 | |
| 29 March 1997 | Rugby Park, Kilmarnock (H) | Estonia | 2–0 | WCQG4 | Tom Boyd, own goal |
| 2 April 1997 | Celtic Park, Glasgow (H) | Austria | 2–0 | WCQG4 | Kevin Gallacher (2) |
| 30 April 1997 | Ullevi, Gothenburg (A) | Sweden | 1–2 | WCQG4 | Kevin Gallacher |
| 27 May 1997 | Rugby Park, Kilmarnock (H) | Wales | 0–1 | Friendly | |
| 1 June 1997 | Ta' Qali Stadium, Ta' Qali (A) | Malta | 3–2 | Friendly | Darren Jackson (2), Christian Dailly |
| 8 June 1997 | Dinamo Stadium, Minsk (A) | Belarus | 1–0 | WCQG4 | Gary McAllister (pen.) |

Key:

- (H) = Home match
- (A) = Away match
- WCQG4 = World Cup qualifying – Group 4

== Notable events ==
- Rangers matched Celtic's record of nine successive top division titles.
- Tommy Burns was sacked as Celtic manager after the end of the season, having won just one trophy in his three years in charge.
- Mark Hateley briefly returned to Rangers after a year in England to provide cover in attack during the title run-in, before moving back to England as player-manager of Hull City.
- Kilmarnock won the Scottish Cup to end their 32-year wait for a major trophy.
- Veteran goalkeeper Jim Leighton transferred from Hibernian to Aberdeen at the end of the season.
- Former Scotland striker Mo Johnston moved to America at the start of the season to play for Kansas City Wizards in the American Major League.
- Trevor Steven, the former England winger, retired from playing at the end of the season after winning seven league titles with Rangers since first joining them in 1989.
- St Johnstone returned to the Premier Division by winning the Division One title by a 20-point margin.
- Brian Laudrup was voted SFWA Footballer of the Year.
- Paolo di Canio was voted SPFA Players' Player of the Year after scoring 15 league goals for Celtic after joining them from AC Milan in his native Italy, but during the close season left them to join Sheffield Wednesday for £4.7million.
