= Ben Honeyman =

Australian soccer player

Personal information
- Date of birth: 14 February 1977 (age 49)
- Place of birth: Adelaide, Australia
- Height: 5 ft 9 in (1.75 m)
- Position: Striker

Youth career
- 1993–1994: Dundee United

Senior career*
Years	Team	Apps	(Gls)
1994–1996	Dundee United	1	(0)
1996–1999	Forfar Athletic	92	(35)
1999	East Fife	8	(3)
1999–2002	Brechin City	56	(17)
Total		157	(55)

Managerial career
- 2005–2006: Arniston Rangers
- * Club domestic league appearances and goals

Ben Honeyman (born 14 February 1977 in Adelaide) is a former Australian football (soccer) player who currently plays cricket for Glenrothes Cricket Club.

== Football career ==
Honeyman began his career with Dundee United but made just two appearances, scoring on his début in the 1–0 Scottish Challenge Cup quarter-final away win over Clydebank in September 1995 and appearing as a substitute in the league defeat at Dumbarton eleven days later. Honeyman failed to appear in another matchday squad and began the following season with Forfar Athletic, where he stayed for three years. After a short spell at East Fife in 1999, Honeyman spent three years with Brechin City, where he finished his senior career in 2002. Following this, Honeyman spent time in junior football, earning a player/manager role with Arniston Rangers, which made him the league's youngest manager at 28 years old.

== Cricket career ==
In 2006, Honeyman turned his back on football and began playing cricket in Fife for Glenrothes, being appointed captain at the start of the 2008 season.

== Career statistics ==
Club	Season	League		Cup		Lg Cup		Other		Total	
Club	Season	Apps	Goals	Apps	Goals	Apps	Goals	Apps	Goals	Apps	Goals
Dundee United	1995–96	1	0	0	0	0	0	1	1	2	1
Dundee United	Total	1	0	0	0	0	0	1	1	2	1
Forfar Athletic	1996–97	36	16	N/A		0	0	N/A		36	16
Forfar Athletic	1997–98	34	12	1	1	2	1	2	0	39	14
Forfar Athletic	1998–99	22	6	3	0	1	0	0	0	26	6
Forfar Athletic	Total	92	35	4	1	3	1	2	0	101	36
East Fife	1998–99	3	2	0	0	0	0	0	0	3	2
East Fife	1999–00	5	1	0	0	2	0	1	0	8	1
East Fife	Total	8	3	0	0	2	0	1	0	11	3
Brechin City	1999–00	22	11	4	2	0	0	0	0	26	13
Brechin City	2000–01	16	3	0	0	1	0	3	0	20	3
Brechin City	2001–02	18	3	1	0	1	0	3	0	23	3
Brechin City	Total	56	17	5	2	2	0	6	0	69	19
Career total		213	11	9	0	14	1	7	1	243	13
