= Henrik Jørgensen (footballer) =

Danish footballer and coach (born 1966)

Personal information
- Full name: Henrik Jørgensen
- Date of birth: 16 February 1966 (age 60)
- Place of birth: Denmark
- Position: Goalkeeper

Team information
- Current team: Vejle Boldklub (Goalkeeping coach)

Senior career*
Years	Team	Apps	(Gls)
1992	Boldklubben 1909	17	(0)
1993	AGF		
1994	Viborg FF		
1994–1995	Dundee United	2	(0)
1996	Suwon Samsung Bluewings	0	(0)
1997	Rajpracha		
- * Club domestic league appearances and goals

Henrik Jørgensen (born 16 February 1966) is a Danish former footballer who played as a goalkeeper. He is currently goalkeeping coach at Vejle Boldklub.

Jørgensen spent the first few years of his career in his native Denmark, playing for sides such as Boldklubben 1909, AGF and Viborg FF. Jørgensen moved to Scottish side Dundee United at the start of the 1994-95 season, joining the Scottish Cup winners as replacement for Guido van de Kamp. In his first game, Jorgensen conceded five goals and although he featured in the following Scottish League Cup match, keeping a clean sheet, his only other first-team appearance was as a substitute. His transfer to United from Viborg was brought into question some months later when it was reported that the transfer was the centre of 'bung' allegations, with United denying the earlier sacking of manager Ivan Golac was related to the incident. Several months later, the Scottish FA announced it would ask the Danish FA for information regarding the transfer. Jorgensen moved on to South Korean side Suwon Samsung Bluewings and only appeared League Cup 5 matches and stayed in Asia for a spell with Thai side Rajpracha.

In September 2008, Jorgensen joined Vejle Boldklub as goalkeeping coach after being "away for a few years".

== See also ==
- Dundee United F.C. season 1994-95
