= Paul Black (Scottish footballer) =

Scottish footballer

Personal information
- Full name: Paul Alexander Black
- Date of birth: 30 October 1977 (age 49)
- Place of birth: Aberdeen, Scotland
- Positions: Winger; full-back

Youth career
- 1993–1994: Dundee United

Senior career*
Years	Team	Apps	(Gls)
1994–1997	Dundee United	1	(0)
1997–2003	Huntly		
- * Club domestic league appearances and goals

Paul Alexander Black (born 30 October 1977 in Aberdeen) is a Scottish former footballer who was once a player with Dundee United in the Scottish Premier Division.

== Career ==
Black signed professional terms in 1994 and was given his debut in 1996–97, in the final day 3–0 defeat at Celtic, coming on as a 77th-minute substitute. Black was released that summer and moved to Huntly, where – as a full-back – he won the resulting Highland Football League title. Black stayed with Huntly before retiring due to injury.
