= Armand Benneker =

Dutch footballer (born 1969)

Personal information
- Date of birth: 25 June 1969 (age 57)
- Place of birth: Tongeren, Belgium
- Height: 1.89 m (6 ft 2 in)
- Position: Defender

Team information
- Current team: Manchester United (first team scout)

Senior career*
Years	Team	Apps	(Gls)
1987–1996	MVV	159	(5)
1996–1997	Dundee United	7	(0)
1999–2000	Austria Lustenau	46	(2)
2000–2001	Bregenz	22	(0)
2001–2002	Austria Lustenau		
2003–2005	Rheindorf Altach		
2005–2007	RW Rankweil		

Managerial career
- 2007: RW Rankweil
- 2008-2011: Dornbirn 1913
- * Club domestic league appearances and goals

Armand Benneker (born 25 June 1969) is a Dutch former professional footballer who played as a defender. He is a first team scout for English club Manchester United. As a player, he appeared for MVV Maastricht in the Netherlands, Dundee United in Scotland and several Austrian clubs, including Austria Lustenau.

== Playing career ==
Benneker was born in Tongeren, Belgium, and began his career with Dutch side MVV, before leaving in 1996 to join Scottish side Dundee United. Benneker only played seven league matches for United in the 1996–97 season and was released in 1997, where he moved to Austria Lustenau to play alongside compatriot Erik Regtop. Further spells in Austria ensued with Bregenz, also with Regtop, another with Austria Lustenau and his final playing days at Rheindorf Altach, where he retired in 2004.

== Coaching and scouting career ==
After retiring as a player, Benneker worked as a coach with Austrian clubs RW Rankweil and Dornbirn and the Swiss FC St. Gallen under-18 teams. He lives in the Austrian town Lustenau near the Swiss border.

In October 2016, Benneker joined Premier League club Manchester United as a first team scout, as part of an overhaul of their scouting network.
