= Dale Gray =

Scottish footballer

Personal information
- Date of birth: 15 February 1978 (age 48)
- Place of birth: Edinburgh, Scotland
- Height: 6 ft 0 in (1.83 m)
- Positions: Defender; midfielder

Youth career
- 1994–1995: Dundee United

Senior career*
Years	Team	Apps	(Gls)
1995–1999	Dundee United	0	(0)
1999–2000	Sligo Rovers	6	(3)
2000	Cowdenbeath	10	(4)
2000–2003	Berwick	41	(0)
- * Club domestic league appearances and goals

Dale Gray (born 15 February 1978 in Edinburgh) is a retired Scottish footballer who played in centre-back or midfielder.

== Career ==
Gray began his career with Dundee United and made two appearances in the 1995–96 Scottish Challenge Cup campaign, featuring in the quarter- and semi-final victories, but failed to appear in the league. Following his release from Dundee United in June 1999, Gray moved to Ireland with Sligo Rovers, who were managed by his former United teammate Jim McInally, before coming back to Scotland to finish the season with Cowdenbeath. In September 2000, Gray moved to Berwick Rangers, where he spent three seasons before his release in June 2003.

== See also ==
- Dundee United F.C. season 1995-96
