= Sandy Robertson (footballer, born 1971) =

Scottish footballer (born 1971)

Personal information
- Full name: Alexander Robertson
- Date of birth: 26 April 1971 (age 55)
- Place of birth: Edinburgh, Scotland
- Position: Midfielder

Youth career
- 1987–1988: Rangers

Senior career*
Years	Team	Apps	(Gls)
1988–1994	Rangers	26	(1)
1994–1995	Coventry City	4	(0)
1995–1997	Dundee United	8	(0)
1997	Airdrieonians	3	(0)
1997–1998	Inverness Caledonian Thistle	16	(1)
1998	Livingston	6	(0)
1998	Clydebank	11	(1)
1999–2000	Morwell Falcons	22	(0)
2000–2001	Joondalup		
2001	Cowdenbeath	1	(0)
2001–2002	Berwick Rangers	8	(1)
2002	Raith Rovers	0	(0)

International career
1991	Scotland U21	2	(0)
- * Club domestic league appearances and goals

Alexander Robertson (born 26 April 1971) is a Scottish former footballer who played in midfield.

== Early life ==
His father, Malcolm Robertson, was also a professional footballer, with Ayr United, Heart of Midlothian and Hibernian.

== Club career ==
Robertson began his career with Rangers where manager Graeme Souness labelled him as the best young player in Britain. He scored the first goal for Rangers' under manager Walter Smith in a 1–0 victory over St Mirren on 20 April 1991 at Love Street.

Robertson then joined Coventry City in England. In July 1995 he returned to Scotland, Dundee United buying him and Steven Pressley for a joint fee of £1 million.

== International career ==
Robertson made two appearances for the Scotland under-21 team at the 1991 Toulon Tournament.

== Personal life ==
In August 1997 he was jailed for assaulting a restaurant doorman in Edinburgh while drunk. He had a previous conviction for assault in 1991. Robertson later received facial scarring in a bottle attack.

== See also ==
- 1995–96 Dundee United F.C. season
- 1996–97 Dundee United F.C. season
