= Stuart Gilmour =

Scottish footballer

Personal information
- Date of birth: 17 August 1977 (age 49)
- Place of birth: Broxburn, Scotland
- Position: Midfielder

Youth career
- Dundee United

Senior career*
Years	Team	Apps	(Gls)
1994–1996	Dundee United	0	(0)
1996–1998	West Calder United		
1998–2003	Whitburn		
- * Club domestic league appearances and goals

Stuart Gilmour (born 17 August 1977 in Broxburn) is a Scottish footballer who plays as a midfielder.

Gilmour began his career with Dundee United but made just one appearance, playing the whole match in the 1-0 Scottish Challenge Cup quarter-final away win over Clydebank in September 1995. Gilmour failed to appear in another matchday squad and was released the following close season. He subsequently played at Junior level, firstly with West Calder United, before signing for Whitburn in July 1998. Gilmour spent five years at Whitburn, winning the Scottish Junior Cup in 1999 and representing Scotland in junior internationals before retiring in 2003 at the age of 26.
