= John Millar (footballer, born 1966) =

Scottish footballer

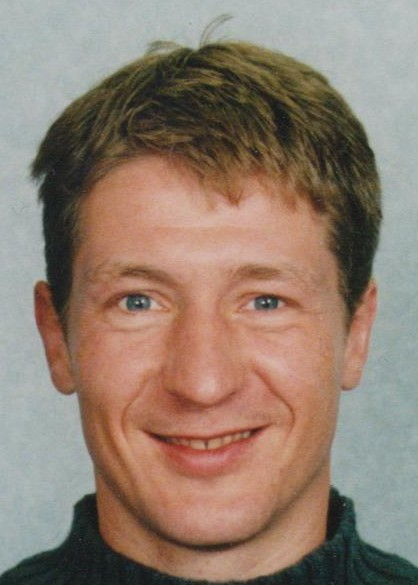

Personal information
- Full name: John Millar
- Date of birth: 8 December 1966 (age 59)
- Place of birth: Coatbridge, Scotland
- Height: 5 ft 7 in (1.70 m)
- Positions: Midfielder; left-back

Youth career
- Clyde Amateurs
- 1984–1986: Chelsea

Senior career*
Years	Team	Apps	(Gls)
1986–1987	Chelsea	11	(0)
1986–1987	→ Hamilton Academical (loan)	10	(0)
1987	→ Northampton Town (loan)	1	(0)
1987–1991	Blackburn Rovers	126	(1)
1991–1996	Heart of Midlothian	133	(21)
1996–1998	Raith Rovers	56	(1)
1998–2000	Livingston	60	(6)
2000–2001	Stirling Albion	31	(4)
Total		428	(33)
- * Club domestic league appearances and goals

John Millar (born 8 December 1966) is a Scottish former professional footballer, who played as a midfielder for Chelsea, Hamilton Academical, Northampton Town, Blackburn Rovers, Heart of Midlothian, Raith Rovers, Livingston and Stirling Albion.

== Chelsea ==
Millar joined Chelsea from Clyde Amateurs in August 1984. A Scottish under-18 International, in his first season at Stamford Bridge he captained the Chelsea Youth Team, playing left back or midfield. He made his senior debut for Chelsea in February 1986.

In his first season at Hearts, he contributed 41 league appearances and seven goals as the Edinburgh side finished runners-up in the 1991–92 Scottish Premier Division.
