= Juan Ferreri =

Uruguayan footballer (born 1970)

Personal information
- Full name: Juan Francisco Ferreri Samuel
- Date of birth: 30 July 1970 (age 56)
- Place of birth: Florida, Uruguay
- Height: 1.79 m (5 ft 10 in)
- Position: Midfielder

Senior career*
| Years | Team | Apps | (Gls) |
| 1991–1994 | Defensor Sporting | | |
| 1995 | Dundee United | 1 | (0) |
| 1996 | Defensor Sporting | ? | (2) |
| 1996 | Huesca | 6 | (0) |
| 1997 | Deportes Iquique | 25 | (6) |
| 1998 | Defensor Sporting | | |
| 1999 | Deportes Iquique | 14 | (2) |
| 1999 | Tianjin Teda | 11 | (2) |
| 2000 | Wuhan Guanggu | 15 | (3) |
| 2000 | Tianjin Teda | 7 | (0) |
| 2001 | Sichuan Mianyang | 11 | (2) |
| 2001 | River Plate (Uruguay) | 12 | (0) |
| 2002 | Defensor Sporting | 12 | (0) |
| 2002 | Carrarese | 11 | (0) |
| 2002 | Bella Vista | 3 | (0) |
| 2003 | Villa Española | 10 | (0) |
| 2003–2004 | River Plate (Uruguay) | 15 | (0) |
| 2004 | Dongguan Dongcheng | 27 | (7) |
| 2005 | Sud América | | |
| 2005 | Rampla Juniors | 15 | (2) |
| 2006–2007 | Bella Vista | 31 | (0) |
| 2007 | Rampla Juniors | 14 | (0) |
| 2008 | Bella Vista | 14 | (0) |
| 2008 | Central Español | 7 | (1) |
| 2009 | Atenas | 18 | (1) |

International career
| 1993–1998 | Uruguay | 2 | (0) |
- * Club domestic league appearances and goals

Juan Francisco Ferreri Samuel (born 30 July 1970) commonly known as Juan Ferreri, is an Uruguayan football coach and former professional footballer who played as a midfielder. He spent his career in Uruguay, Scotland, Spain, Chile, China and Italy.

== Club career ==
Ferreri was born in Florida, Uruguay. He started his career at Defensor Sporting in 1991.

=== Scotland ===
He was signed by Dundee United in January 1995. He made his only appearance of the season in the 6–1 home win against Motherwell on January 21, 1995, substituted for Dave Bowman. They finally relegated from the top division and Ferreri left the club after the season.

=== Spain ===
Ferreri joined Huesca in July 1996, made 6 appearances in 1996–97 Segunda División B. He made his debut for the Spanish club in the 1–0 home defeat against Real Unión on 22 September 1996. He returned to South America in 1997.

=== Chile ===
In 1997, Ferreri moved to Deportes Iquique and played in 1997 Primera B. He made 25 appearances and scored 6 goals in the whole year. They finished 2nd and promoted back to the top league. He rejoined Deportes Iquique in 1999, played 14 games and scored twice.

=== China ===
Ferreri first came to China in 1999, joined Tianjin Teda. He made 11 appearances and scored twice. The next year, he moved to Wuhan Hongtao K of Chinese Jia-B League. He rejoined Tianjin Teda in July 2000. In 2001, he moved to another Jia-B League team Sichuan Mianyang, while the club was involved in the match-fixing scandal at the end of the season.

=== Italy ===
Ferreri came to Italy in 2002. He made 11 appearances for Carrarese in 2002–03 Serie C1. He made his Italian debut on September 15, 2002, in the 2–2 home draw against Padova.

=== Later career ===
In 2004, after playing for several teams in Uruguay, he returned to China and joined Dongguan Dongcheng of China League One. He played 27 games and scored 7 goals. However, he couldn't prevent the club from being relegated to the third-tier league.

Ferreri last played for Atenas in 2009 and was promoted to the Uruguayan Primera Division. He retired at the end of the season.

== International career ==
Ferreri made two appearances for the senior Uruguay national team. He made his debut in the 5–0 away defeat against Germany on 13 October 1993.

== After retirement ==
Ferreri is a long-time assistant coach of Jorge Giordano in Racing, Juventud, Montevideo Wanderers and River Plate.

== Honours ==
Defensor

- Uruguayan Primera División: 1990–91

Deportes Iquique

- Primera B (Chile): 1997
