= George O'Boyle =

Northern Irish footballer and manager (born 1967)

Personal information
- Date of birth: 14 December 1967 (age 58)
- Place of birth: Belfast, Northern Ireland
- Position: Striker

Senior career*
Years	Team	Apps	(Gls)
1984–1985	Manchester City	0	(0)
1985–1986	Distillery	24	(4)
1986–1987	Linfield	22	(12)
1987–1989	Bordeaux	3	(0)
1988–1989	→ Linfield (loan)	24	(9)
1989–1990	→ Dunfermline Athletic (loan)	28	(3)
1990–1994	Dunfermline Athletic	67	(26)
1994–2001	St Johnstone	146	(64)
2001	Raith Rovers	5	(0)
2001	Brechin City	5	(2)
2001–2002	Queen of the South	7	(3)
2002–2003	Glenavon	33	(9)
2003–2004	Ards	9	(0)
2004–2006	Bo'ness United	64	(24)
2006	Kelty Hearts	0	(0)
2006–2008	Carnoustie Panmure	4	(0)
Total		441	(156)

International career
1994–1998	Northern Ireland	13	(1)
1998	Northern Ireland B	1	(1)

Managerial career
- 2015–2016: Albert Foundry
- 2016–2019: Distillery (joint-manager)
- 2019: Harland & Wolff Welders (joint-manager)
- * Club domestic league appearances and goals

George O'Boyle (born 14 December 1967) is a Northern Irish former professional footballer and now manager.

== Playing career ==
=== Club football ===
O'Boyle, a striker, began his career in 1984 as a youth-team player with Manchester City. He was part of the Maine Road club's youth academy before earning a two-year contract.

After being released by City when he reached the age of 18, he returned to his native Belfast, finding a home on the Shankill Road, to join Distillery, then managed by Roy Welsh, in November 1985. The club won the County Antrim Shield in his first season.

He moved to Linfield in 1986.

O'Boyle left Northern Ireland in 1988 to join French club Bordeaux.

He returned to Linfield on loan in 1989.

In 1989 he joined Dunfermline Athletic, initially on loan for a year, before signing permanently for £250,000.

In 1994, he was signed by St Johnstone manager Paul Sturrock for a tribunal-decided £200,000 fee. He reached both the high and low points of his career during his seven years at McDiarmid Park. However, injury struck again; O'Boyle once more ruptured a cruciate ligament, while he required two operations on a groin problem.

O'Boyle played in the 1998 Scottish League Cup final defeat by Rangers.

On 5 January 2001, O'Boyle and St Johnstone teammate Kevin Thomas were sacked following drug-taking allegations. The two players, it was alleged, were found using an unidentified white powder (allegedly cocaine) at the club's Christmas 2000 party in Perth's That Bar. The SPL attempted to overturn the sacking but it was over-ruled by the SFA.

After leaving St Johnstone, O'Boyle joined Raith Rovers for four months, before moving on to Brechin City and Queen of the South, with whom he finished his professional career.

He returned to Northern Ireland to play for Glenavon and Ards, only to return to Scotland in 2004 to play for junior clubs Bo'ness and Kelty Hearts. He failed to make an appearance for the latter club, due to injury.

=== International football ===
O'Boyle's international career spanned four years. In 1996, he scored his only Northern Ireland goal in a 1–1 draw with Germany in his hometown of Belfast.

=== Honours ===
Distillery

- County Antrim Shield: 1986

Linfield

- NIFL Premier Intermediate League: 1986–87, 1988–89
- Gold Cup: 1988–89
- Irish League Cup: 1986–87

Dunfermline Athletic

- Scottish Football League First Division: 1988–89

St Johnstone

- Scottish Football League First Division: 1996–97

== Coaching career ==
O'Boyle managed Carnoustie Panmure, the final club for which he played.

He would leave football altogether until 2015, when he became assistant to manager Colin McIlwaine at Northern Amateur Football League club Albert Foundry. In the summer of 2016 O'Boyle followed McIlwaine to Lisburn Distillery, again taking up the role of assistant. The duo resigned in April 2019.

O'Boyle and McIlwaine became the new joint-managers of NIFL Championship side Harland & Wolff Welders just a couple of days after departing Distillery. They both left the club in December, seven months after their appointments.
