= Paul Walker (footballer, born 1977) =

Scottish footballer

Personal information
- Full name: Paul Walker
- Date of birth: 20 August 1977 (age 49)
- Place of birth: Kilwinning, Scotland
- Position: Winger

Youth career
- 1992–1995: Dundee United

Senior career*
Years	Team	Apps	(Gls)
1995–1998	Dundee United	6	(0)
1998–1999	St Mirren	1	(0)
1999–2001	Stranraer	58	(13)
2000	→ Queens Park (loan)	8	(2)
2001–2003	Partick Thistle	39	(4)
2003–2005	Greenock Morton	64	(9)
2005–2006	Stranraer	22	(1)
2006	Montrose	2	(0)
2006–2007	Ayr United	9	(0)
2007–2008	East Fife	9	(3)
- Irvine Meadow
- * Club domestic league appearances and goals as of 12:10, 4 February 2009 (UTC)

Paul Walker (born 20 August 1977 in Kilwinning, North Ayrshire, Scotland) is a Scottish footballer who played as a winger.

Having been developed as a player through Dundee United 's youth system, Walker made six league appearances for the United first team, his last coming in September 1997. In December 1998, he joined St Mirren but would make just one substitute league appearance before joining Stranraer three months later. His stay at Stair Park lasted two-and-a-half years, where he managed 14 goals from 61 league appearances; his stay included a short loan spell with Queens Park. In 2001, he headed to Partick Thistle, where he spent two seasons, before a similar time with Greenock Morton. A year back at Stranraer followed, before a short-lived spell at Montrose. Walker signed for Ayr United in August 2006 before joining East Fife at the start of the 2007–08 season. After playing just once in the 2008–09 season, Walker moved to Junior level with Irvine Meadow.

== Honours ==
Queen's Park

- Scottish Third Division: 1999–2000

Partick Thistle

- Scottish First Division: 2001–02
