= Kevin Thomas (footballer, born 1975) =

Scottish footballer

Personal information
- Full name: Kevin Thomas
- Date of birth: 25 April 1975 (age 51)
- Place of birth: Edinburgh, Scotland
- Height: 5 ft 11 in (1.80 m)
- Position: Striker

Youth career
- 1991–1992: Links United

Senior career*
Years	Team	Apps	(Gls)
1992–1998	Heart of Midlothian	51	(7)
1998	→ Stirling Albion (loan)	6	(0)
- → TPV Tampere (loan)
1998–1999	Greenock Morton	25	(12)
1999–2001	St Johnstone	12	(2)
2001–2002	Berwick Rangers	4	(1)
2002	Montrose	2	(0)
- Bo'ness United

International career
1993–1996	Scotland U21	9	(3)
- * Club domestic league appearances and goals

Kevin Thomas (born 25 April 1975) is a Scottish former professional footballer.

== Career ==
=== Early career ===
Thomas began his career with Heart of Midlothian, and represented the Scotland national under-21 football team. He failed to build on an exciting early breakthrough to the Hearts first team. He had initially been seen as the new John Robertson as one of the most exciting young strikers to break through for many years. He represented Scotland at Under 21 level on many occasions. His early promise was cut short by an horrific injury which kept him out for the best part of two years – an injury which he never fully recovered from. Eventually, he was loaned to Stirling Albion in 1998 and then sold to Greenock Morton later that year. Thomas found some form at Morton, scoring 12 goals in 25 league games. Sandy Clark, Thomas' former manager at Hearts, signed Thomas for St Johnstone in August 1999 for a fee of £150,000.

=== Later career ===
Thomas had suffered a cruciate ligament injury in October 2000, which meant that he had to undergo an operation to repair the ligament. He was expected to be unavailable for the rest of the 2000–01 season. However, following a cocaine arrest in December 2000, Thomas was sacked by St Johnstone, along with team-mate George O'Boyle.

After recovering from a knee injury, Thomas signed short term deals with lower league clubs Montrose and Berwick Rangers during the 2001–02 season. After leaving Berwick, he played for Edinburgh Athletic in the East of Scotland Football League and worked for an hotel booking agency run by his mother.
