= Neil Caldwell (footballer) =

Scottish footballer

Personal information
- Date of birth: 25 September 1975 (age 51)
- Place of birth: Glasgow, Scotland
- Position: Defender

Youth career
- 1992–1993: Rangers

Senior career*
Years	Team	Apps	(Gls)
1993–1995	Rangers	1	(0)
1995	Dundee United	2	(0)
- * Club domestic league appearances and goals

Neil Caldwell (born 25 September 1975 in Glasgow) is a Scottish former footballer who played in defence. Caldwell began his career with Rangers and made one league appearance before his release in 1995. Following his release from Ibrox, Caldwell moved to Dundee United, where he featured in the first four appearances of the season, scoring in the Scottish Challenge Cup match against Cowdenbeath. The goal proved to be Caldwell's only in senior football as, appearing in one further match, his last matchday appearance was as an unused substitute in September 1995.

After leaving United, Caldwell moved to junior side Petershill but left Petershill Park after one season, moving to Rutherglen Glencairn afterwards before retiring.
