= David Craig (Scottish footballer) =

Scottish footballer (born 1969)

Personal information
- Full name: David William Craig
- Date of birth: 11 June 1969 (age 57)
- Place of birth: Glasgow, Scotland
- Height: 1.80 m (5 ft 11 in)
- Position: Defender

Senior career*
Years	Team	Apps	(Gls)
1989–1991	Partick Thistle	12	(1)
1991–1994	East Stirlingshire	88	(6)
1994–1995	Dundee United	6	(0)
1995–1996	Hamilton Academical	17	(1)
1996–1997	Raith Rovers	29	(0)
1997–1998	Hamilton Academical	32	(0)
2000	Hong Kong Rangers	5	(0)
2000–2004	Ayr United	167	(10)
2004–2005	Queen of the South	19	(1)
2005	Brechin City	0	(0)
2005–2006	Partick Thistle	17	(1)
2006–2008	Dumbarton	43	(1)
2008	Montrose	2	(0)
2009	Stranraer (trial)	2	(0)
2009–2010	Elgin City	24	(0)
Total		463	(21)
- * Club domestic league appearances and goals

David William Craig (born 11 June 1969, in Glasgow) is a Scottish former professional footballer who played as a defender. He played for numerous clubs in the Scottish Football League, including East Stirlingshire, Dundee United, Hamilton Academical and Ayr United. He was named in the PFA Scotland Third Division Team of the Year for 2006–07 while playing for Dumbarton.

== Career ==
Craig began his career at the end of the 1980s with Partick Thistle, making a dozen league appearances for The Jags before joining East Stirlingshire in 1991. Spending three years with The Shire, Craig won a move to Scottish Premier Division side Dundee United in 1994, making his league debut in November as a substitute. Craig's next league appearance came in February, and although he started a further three league matches, Craig appeared in only one matchday squad following the side's relegation, joining Hamilton Academical in September 1995.

After a year with Hamilton, Craig joined Kirkcaldy side Raith Rovers, returning to Hamilton after one season. Again, Craig spent a year with Accies before beginning a six-year stint with Ayr United, where his time included finishing as Scottish First Division runners-up and League Cup runners-up in the early 2000s. In 2004, Craig moved to Queen of the South in the era of captain Jim Thomson. Craig spent a year in Dumfries, scoring once against Partick, before a short spell with Brechin City.

Returning to Partick in 2005, Craig was part of the side that won the First Division play-offs in 2005–06, winning promotion. He scored once in their promotion campaign against Stirling Albion. Instead of joining Thistle in the First Division, Craig moved to Dumbarton, spending two years with The Sons. After short spells with junior club Arthurlie and Montrose, and a trial with Stranraer, he joined Elgin City in 2009.

== Honours ==
=== Ayr United ===
Scottish League Cup Runner-up: 1

2001–02

=== Partick Thistle ===
Scottish First Division Play-offs: 1

2005–06
