= 1996–97 Scottish Premier Division =

91st season of top-tier football league in Scotland

Scottish Premier Division
- Season: 1996–97
- Dates: 10 August 1996 – 10 May 1997
- Champions: Rangers; 12th Premier Division title 47th Scottish title
- Promoted: Dunfermline; Dundee United
- Relegated: Raith Rovers
- Champions League: Rangers
- UEFA Cup: Celtic; Dundee United
- Cup Winners' Cup: Kilmarnock
- Goals: 504 (27)
- Average goals/game: 2.8
- Top goalscorer: Jorge Cadete (25)
- Biggest home win: Celtic 6–0 Kilmarnock (08 Jan)
- Biggest away win: Raith Rovers 0–6 Rangers (15 Apr)
- Highest attendance: 50,210, Rangers 2–0 Celtic (28 Sep)
- Lowest attendance: 3,052, Raith Rovers 1–5 Motherwell (18 Feb)
- Average attendance: 17,194 (2,159)

The 1996–97 Scottish Premier Division season was the penultimate season of Scottish Premier Division football before the change to the Scottish Premier League. It began on 10 August 1996.

== Overview ==
The 1996–97 Scottish Premier Division season ended in success for Rangers who won the title by five points from nearest rivals Celtic to clinch nine titles in a row, equalling Celtic's record from the 1973–74 season. Raith Rovers were relegated to the First Division after finishing bottom. As champions, Rangers qualified for the Champions League while Celtic were joined by third-placed Dundee United in qualifying for the UEFA Cup. Seventh-placed Kilmarnock qualified for the penultimate Cup Winners' Cup as Scottish Cup winners.

The season began on 10 August with the first goal of the season scored by Dundee United's Gary McSwegan as they drew 1–1 at home to Motherwell. The season ended on 10 May with Celtic's Tommy Johnson netting a late goal to cap a 3–0 win at home to Dundee United to claim the final goal of the season.

== Clubs ==
=== Promotion and relegation from 1995–96 ===
Promoted from First Division to Premier League

- Dunfermline Athletic
- Dundee United (via play-off)

Relegated from Premier Division to First Division

- Partick Thistle (via play-off)
- Falkirk

=== Stadia and locations ===
Location of clubs in the 1996–97 Scottish Premier Division

Team	Location	Stadium
Aberdeen	Aberdeen	Pittodrie Stadium
Celtic	Parkhead, Glasgow	Celtic Park
Dundee United	Dundee	Tannadice Park
Dunfermline Athletic	Dunfermline	East End Park
Heart of Midlothian	Gorgie, Edinburgh	Tynecastle Park
Hibernian	Leith, Edinburgh	Easter Road
Kilmarnock	Kilmarnock	Rugby Park
Motherwell	Motherwell	Fir Park
Raith Rovers	Kirkcaldy	Stark's Park
Rangers	Ibrox, Glasgow	Ibrox Park

=== Managers ===
Team	Manager
Aberdeen	(Scotland) Roy Aitken
Celtic	(Scotland) Billy Stark (caretaker)
Dundee United	(Scotland) Tommy McLean
Dunfermline Athletic	(Scotland) Bert Paton
Heart of Midlothian	(Scotland) Jim Jefferies
Hibernian	(Scotland) Jim Duffy
Kilmarnock	(Scotland) Bobby Williamson
Motherwell	(Scotland) Alex McLeish
Raith Rovers	(Scotland) Steve Kirk (Socialist Federal Republic of Yugoslavia) Miodrag Krivokapić (joint caretakers)
Rangers	(Scotland) Walter Smith

==== Managerial changes ====
Team	Outgoing manager	Date of vacancy	Manner of departure	Incoming manager	Date of appointment
Raith Rovers	(Scotland) Jimmy Thomson	24 August 1996	Resigned	(Scotland) Tommy McLean	2 September 1996
Hibernian	(Scotland) Alex Miller	30 September 1996	Sacked	(Scotland) Jocky Scott (interim) (Scotland) Jim Duffy (permanent)	30 September 1996; 30 December 1996
Dundee United	(Scotland) Billy Kirkwood	10 September 1996	Sacked	(Scotland) Tommy McLean	10 September 1996
Raith Rovers	(Scotland) Tommy McLean	10 September 1996	Signed by Dundee United	(Scotland) Iain Munro	20 September 1996
Kilmarnock	(Scotland) Alex Totten	4 December 1996	Sacked	(Scotland) Bobby Williamson	4 December 1996
Raith Rovers	(Scotland) Iain Munro	14 April 1997	Sacked	(Scotland) Steve Kirk (Socialist Federal Republic of Yugoslavia) Miodrag Krivokapić (joint caretakers)	16 April 1997
Celtic	(Scotland) Tommy Burns	2 May 1997	Resigned	(Scotland) Billy Stark (caretaker)	2 May 1997

== Events ==
- 17 August: Ally McCoist hits the first hat-trick of the season in a 5–2 win at Dunfermline.
- 7 May: Rangers win the title with a 1–0 win at Dundee United

== League table ==
Pos	Team	Pld	W	D	L	GF	GA	GD	Pts	Qualification or relegation
1	Rangers (C)	36	25	5	6	85	33	+52	80	Qualification for the Champions League first qualifying round
2	Celtic	36	23	6	7	78	32	+46	75	Qualification for the UEFA Cup first qualifying round (Note: As the League Cup winners Rangers had qualified for European competition via their league position, the place in the UEFA Cup was passed to the next highest placed team in the league, Dundee United.)
3	Dundee United	36	17	9	10	46	33	+13	60	Qualification for the UEFA Cup first qualifying round
4	Heart of Midlothian	36	14	10	12	46	43	+3	52	
5	Dunfermline Athletic	36	12	9	15	52	65	−13	45	
6	Aberdeen	36	10	14	12	45	54	−9	44	
7	Kilmarnock	36	11	6	19	41	61	−20	39	Qualification for the Cup Winners' Cup qualifying round (Note: Kilmarnock qualified for the Cup Winners' Cup as the winners of the Scottish Cup.)
8	Motherwell	36	9	11	16	44	55	−11	38	
9	Hibernian (O)	36	9	11	16	38	55	−17	38	Qualification for the Play-off
10	Raith Rovers (R)	36	6	7	23	29	73	−44	25	Relegation to the First Division

Source: Soccerbase
Rules for classification: 1) Points; 2) Goal difference; 3) Goals scored
(C) Champions; (O) Play-off winners; (R) Relegated

== Results ==
=== Matches 1–18 ===
During matches 1–18 each team plays every other team twice (home and away).

Home \ Away	ABE	CEL	DUN	DNF	HOM	HIB	KIL	MOT	RAI	RAN
Aberdeen		2–2	3–3	3–0	4–0	0–2	3–0	0–0	1–0	0–3
Celtic	1–0		1–0	5–1	2–2	5–0	6–0	1–0	4–1	0–1
Dundee United	1–0	1–2		1–1	1–0	0–1	0–0	1–1	1–2	1–0
Dunfermline Athletic	2–3	0–2	1–1		2–1	2–1	2–1	1–1	3–1	2–5
Heart of Midlothian	1–2	2–2	1–0	2–0		0–0	3–2	1–1	0–0	1–4
Hibernian	0–1	0–4	1–1	0–0	1–3		1–2	2–0	1–0	2–1
Kilmarnock	3–0	1–3	0–2	2–2	2–0	4–2		2–4	2–1	1–4
Motherwell	2–2	2–1	1–3	2–3	0–2	1–1	1–0		0–1	0–1
Raith Rovers	1–4	1–2	3–2	1–2	1–1	0–3	1–0	0–3		2–2
Rangers	2–2	2–0	1–0	3–1	3–0	4–3	4–2	5–0	1–0	

Source: Soccerbot
Legend: Blue = home team win; Yellow = draw; Red = away team win.

=== Matches 19–36 ===
During matches 19–36 each team plays every other team a further two times (home and away).

Home \ Away	ABE	CEL	DUN	DNF	HOM	HIB	KIL	MOT	RAI	RAN
Aberdeen		1–2	1–1	0–2	0–0	1–1	2–1	0–0	2–0	2–2
Celtic	3–0		3–0	4–2	2–0	4–1	0–0	5–0	2–0	0–1
Dundee United	4–0	1–0		2–1	1–0	0–0	2–0	2–2	2–1	0–1
Dunfermline Athletic	3–0	1–1	2–3		2–3	1–1	3–1	3–1	2–0	0–3
Heart of Midlothian	0–0	1–2	1–2	1–1		1–0	2–0	4–1	3–2	3–1
Hibernian	3–1	1–3	2–0	1–0	0–4		0–1	1–1	1–1	1–2
Kilmarnock	1–1	2–0	2–3	2–1	1–0	1–1		1–0	0–1	1–1
Motherwell	2–2	0–1	1–1	2–2	0–1	2–1	2–0		5–0	1–3
Raith Rovers	2–2	1–1	0–1	0–1	1–2	1–1	2–1	1–5		0–6
Rangers	4–0	3–1	0–2	4–0	0–0	3–1	1–2	0–2	4–0	

Source: Soccerbot
Legend: Blue = home team win; Yellow = draw; Red = away team win.

== Play-off ==
A two leg play-off took place between the 9th placed team in the Premier Division (Hibernian) and the runner-up of the First Division (Airdrieonians) for a place in the 1997–98 Scottish Premier Division.

Hibernian won the first leg 1–0 at Easter Road, and went on to win the second leg by 4 goals to 2 at Broadwood Stadium. Therefore, Hibernian maintained their Premier Division status for another season, 5–2 on aggregate.

== Top scorers ==
Player	Goals	Team
(Portugal) Jorge Cadete	25	Celtic
(Denmark) Brian Laudrup	16	Rangers
(Scotland) Paul Wright	15	Kilmarnock
(Scotland) Billy Dodds	14	Aberdeen
(Scotland) John Robertson	14	Hearts
(Netherlands) Pierre van Hooijdonk	14	Celtic
(Scotland) Gerry Britton	13	Dunfermline Athletic
(England) Paul Gascoigne	13	Rangers
(Italy) Paolo Di Canio	12	Celtic
(Sweden) Kjell Olofsson	12	Dundee United
(Republic of Ireland) Tommy Coyne	11	Motherwell
(Scotland) Darren Jackson	11	Hibernian
(Germany) Jörg Albertz	10	Rangers
(Scotland) Ally McCoist	10	Rangers
(Scotland) Andy Smith	10	Dunfermline Athletic
(England) Dean Windass	10	Aberdeen

Source: Soccerbot

== Awards ==
- Player awards

Award	Winner	Club
PFA Players' Player of the Year	(Italy) Paolo Di Canio	Celtic
PFA Young Player of the Year	(Scotland) Robbie Winters	Dundee United
SFWA Footballer of the Year	(Denmark) Brian Laudrup	Rangers

- Manager awards

Award	Winner	Club
SFWA Manager of the Year	(Scotland) Walter Smith	Rangers

== Attendances ==
#	Football club	Home games	Average attendance
1	Rangers FC	18	48,122
2	Celtic FC	18	47,691
3	Aberdeen FC	18	12,603
4	Heart of Midlothian	18	12,349
5	Hibernian FC	18	10,631
6	Dundee United	18	9,320
7	Kilmarnock FC	18	9,121
8	Dunfermline Athletic	18	8,753
9	Motherwell FC	18	7,256
10	Raith Rovers	18	5,907
