= Sérgio Gomes =

Brazilian footballer

Personal information
- Full name: Sérgio Henriques Gomes
- Date of birth: 27 July 1969 (age 57)
- Place of birth: Juiz de Fora, Brazil
- Height: 1.77 m (5 ft 10 in)
- Position: Striker

Senior career*
Years	Team	Apps	(Gls)
1990–1991	Tupi		
1991–1995	Amora	88	(33)
1995	Dundee United	14	(3)
1995–1996	Al-Kuwait		
- * Club domestic league appearances and goals

Sérgio Henriques Gomes is a former Brazilian footballer who plays as a striker. He was the first Brazilian to play in the Scottish Premier Division when he appeared for Dundee United in 1995. He made 14 league appearances for the club, scoring three goals.
