= 1996–97 Scottish Cup =

Tournament details
- Country: Scotland

Final positions
- Champions: Kilmarnock
- Runners-up: Falkirk

The 1996–97 Scottish Cup was the 112th staging of Scotland's most prestigious football knockout competition. The Cup was won by Kilmarnock who defeated Falkirk in the final.

== First round ==
| Home team | Score | Away team |
|---|---|---|
| Huntly (HL) | 1 – 1 | Clyde (3) |
| Alloa Athletic (4) | 3 – 1 | Hawick Royal Albert (ESL) |
| Elgin City (HL) | 0 – 3 | Whitehill Welfare (ESL) |
| Albion Rovers (4) | 0 – 0 | Forfar Athletic (4) |

=== Replays ===
| Home team | Score | Away team |
|---|---|---|
| Clyde (3) | 3 – 2 (a.e.t.) | Huntly (HL) |
| Forfar Athletic (4) | 4 – 0 | Albion Rovers (4) |

== Second round ==
| Home team | Score | Away team |
|---|---|---|
| Berwick Rangers | 2 – 1 | Peterhead |
| Queen's Park | 2 – 1 | Gala Fairydean |
| Ayr United | 0 – 2 | Clyde |
| East Stirlingshire | 4 – 3 | Brora Rangers |
| Spartans | 0 – 0 | Arbroath |
| Whitehill Welfare | 2 – 3 | Queen of the South |
| Brechin City | 2 – 1 | Livingston |
| Cowdenbeath | 1 – 0 | Dumbarton |
| Forfar Athletic | 0 – 1 | Alloa Athletic |
| Ross County | 3 – 0 | Montrose |
| Stenhousemuir | 1 – 2 | Hamilton Academical |
| Stranraer | 1 – 1 | Inverness CT |

=== Replays ===
| Home team | Score | Away team |
|---|---|---|
| Arbroath | 3 – 0 | Spartans |
| Inverness CT | 0 – 0 (a.e.t.); 4 – 3 (pen.) | Stranraer |

== Third round ==
| Home team | Score | Away team |
|---|---|---|
| Hibernian | 2 – 2 | Aberdeen |
| Airdrieonians | 1 – 4 | Raith Rovers |
| Clydebank | 0 – 5 | Celtic |
| Arbroath | 2 – 2 | Greenock Morton |
| Clyde | 3 – 1 | St Mirren |
| Dundee | 3 – 1 | Queen of the South |
| Dunfermline Athletic | 4 – 0 | Ross County |
| Falkirk | 1 – 1 | Berwick Rangers |
| Hearts | 5 – 0 | Cowdenbeath |
| Inverness CT | 1 – 3 | Hamilton Academical |
| Kilmarnock | 2 – 0 | East Stirlingshire |
| Partick Thistle | 0 – 2 | Motherwell |
| Queen's Park | 1 – 3 | East Fife |
| Rangers | 2 – 0 | St Johnstone |
| Stirling Albion | 0 – 2 | Dundee United |
| Brechin City | 3 – 0 | Alloa Athletic |

=== Replays ===
| Home team | Score | Away team |
|---|---|---|
| Aberdeen | 0 – 0 (a.e.t.); 3 – 5 (pen.) | Hibernian |
| Greenock Morton | 4 – 0 | Arbroath |
| Berwick Rangers | 1 – 2 | Falkirk |

== Fourth round ==
| Home team | Score | Away team |
|---|---|---|
| Hibernian | 1 – 1 | Celtic |
| Hearts | 1 – 1 | Dundee United |
| Brechin City | 1 – 2 | Raith Rovers |
| Clyde | 0 – 1 | Kilmarnock |
| Falkirk | 2 – 1 | Dunfermline Athletic |
| Greenock Morton | 2 – 2 | Dundee |
| Motherwell | 1 – 1 | Hamilton Academical |
| Rangers | 3 – 0 | East Fife |

=== Replays ===
| Home team | Score | Away team |
|---|---|---|
| Dundee | 0 – 1 (a.e.t.) | Greenock Morton |
| Celtic | 2 – 0 | Hibernian |
| Hamilton Academical | 0 – 2 | Motherwell |
| Dundee United | 1 – 0 | Hearts |

== Quarter-finals ==
| Home team | Score | Away team |
|---|---|---|
| Dundee United | 4 – 1 | Motherwell |
| Falkirk | 2 – 0 | Raith Rovers |
| Greenock Morton | 2 – 5 | Kilmarnock |
| Celtic | 2 – 0 | Rangers |

== Semi-finals ==
12 April 1997

| Celtic | 1–1 | Falkirk |
|---|---|---|
| Johnson 66' | | James 82' |

Ibrox Stadium, Glasgow
Attendance: 45,261
Referee: Willie Young

14 April 1997

| Kilmarnock | 0–0 | Dundee United |

Easter Road, Edinburgh
Attendance: 12,391
Referee: Jim McCluskey

=== Replays ===
22 April 1997

| Kilmarnock | 1–0 | Dundee United |
|---|---|---|
| McIntyre 86' |

Easter Road, Edinburgh
Attendance: 9,225
Referee: Jim McCluskey

23 April 1997

| Celtic | 0–1 | Falkirk |
|---|---|---|
| | | McGrillen 19' |

Ibrox Stadium, Glasgow
Attendance: 35,879
Referee: Willie Young

== Final ==
24 May 1997

| Kilmarnock | 1–0 | Falkirk |
|---|---|---|
| Wright 20' |

Ibrox Stadium, Glasgow
Attendance: 48,953
Referee: Hugh Dallas

== Largest Wins ==
A list of the largest wins from the competition.

| Score | Home team | Away team | Stage |
|---|---|---|---|
| 0-5 | Clydebank | Celtic | Third Round |
| 5-0 | Heart of Midlothian | Cowdenbeath | Third Round |
| 4-0 | Forfar Athletic | Albion Rovers | First Round (Replay) |
| 4-0 | Greenock Morton | Arbroath | Third Round (Replay) |
| 4-1 | Dundee United | Motherwell | Quarter Finals |
| 2-5 | Greenock Morton | Kilmarnock | Quarter Finals |
| 1-4 | Airdireonians | Raith Rovers | Third Round |
