= 1996–97 Scottish League Cup =

Tournament details
- Country: Scotland

Final positions
- Champions: Rangers
- Runners-up: Heart of Midlothian

The 1996–97 Scottish League Cup was the 51st staging of Scotland's second most prestigious football knockout competition, also known for sponsorship reasons as the Coca-Cola Cup.

The competition was won by Rangers, who defeated Heart of Midlothian 4–3 in the final, played at Celtic Park.

== First round ==
Home team	Score	Away team
Albion Rovers	4–0	Arbroath
Ayr United	5–2	Livingston
Brechin City	3–0	Montrose
Clyde	1–0	Inverness CT [aet]
Cowdenbeath	1–2	Forfar Athletic
East Stirlingshire	1–3	Alloa Athletic
Queen's Park	3–1	Ross County [aet]
Stranraer	2–0	Queen of the South

== Second round ==
Home team	Score	Away team
Clyde	1–3	Celtic
Clydebank	0–3	Rangers
Heart of Midlothian	(p)1–1	Stenhousemuir
Stranraer	1–2	Dunfermline Athletic
Airdrieonians	3–2	Raith Rovers
Brechin City	0–2	Hibernian
Dundee	2–1	Dumbarton
East Fife	1–5	St Johnstone
Falkirk	2–3	Albion Rovers
Kilmarnock	0–1	Ayr United
Morton	(p)1–1	Hamilton Academical
Motherwell	0–0(p)	Alloa Athletic
Partick Thistle	3–0	Forfar Athletic
Queen's Park	0–2	Aberdeen
St Mirren	4–0	Berwick Rangers
Stirling Albion	1–2	Dundee United

== Third round ==
Home team	Score	Away team
Alloa Athletic	1–5	Celtic
Dunfermline Athletic	3–1	St Mirren
Rangers	3–1	Ayr United
Albion Rovers	0–2	Hibernian
Dundee United	2–2(p)	Dundee
Morton	3–7	Aberdeen
Partick Thistle	1–0	Airdrieonians
St Johnstone	1–3 (a.e.t.)	Heart of Midlothian

== Quarter-finals ==
17 September 1996

Hearts	1–0 (a.e.t.)	Celtic
Robertson 110'	Report

Tynecastle Stadium, Edinburgh
Attendance: 14,442

17 September 1996

Dunfermline Athletic	2–0	Partick Thistle
Bingham 60'; Britton 79'	Report

East End Park, Dunfermline
Attendance: 5,322

17 September 1996

Dundee	2–1	Aberdeen
Paul Tosh 35'; Jim Hamilton 89'	Report	Billy Dodds 72' (pen.)

Dens Park, Dundee
Attendance: 8,650

18 September 1996

Rangers	4–0	Hibernian
Durie 29' van Vossen 47', 80'; Albertz 89'	Report

Ibrox Stadium, Glasgow
Attendance: 45,104
Referee: Jim McCluskey

== Semi-finals ==
22 October 1996

Dunfermline Athletic	1–6	Rangers
Moore 61'	Report	Laudrup 41', 69'; McInnes 56'; Andersen 63', 64'; Albertz 82'

Celtic Park, Glasgow
Attendance: 16,791

23 October 1996

Hearts	3–1	Dundee
Beckford 20'; Cameron 30' (pen.); Paille 60'		Jim Hamilton 73'

Easter Road, Edinburgh
Attendance: 15,653

== Final ==
24 November 1996

Rangers	4–3	Hearts
McCoist 11', 27'; Gascoigne 64', 66'	Report	Fulton 44'; Robertson 59'; Weir 88'

Celtic Park, Glasgow
Attendance: 48,559
