= 1997–98 Dundee United F.C. season =

Dundee United
1997–98 season
- Chairman: Jim McLean
- Manager: Tommy McLean
- Stadium: Tannadice Park
- Premier Division: Seventh place
- Scottish Cup: Quarter-finals
- League Cup: Runners-up
- UEFA Cup: First round
- Top goalscorer: League: Kjell Olofsson (18); All: Kjell Olofsson (23)
- Highest home attendance: 14,200 vs. Rangers, Premier Division, 9 May 1998
- Lowest home attendance: 6,685 vs. Dunfermline Athletic, Premier Division, 6 December 1997
| Home colours | Away colours | Third colours |

The 1997–98 season was the 89th year of football played by Dundee United, and covered the period from 1 July 1997 to 30 June 1998. United finished the Scottish Premier Division 1997–98 season in 7th place with 37 points, in the final season before the revamped Scottish Premier League. Despite finishing 3rd in the previous season, 7th would be the club's best finish for the next six years.

== Summary ==
Dundee United played a total of 49 competitive matches during the 1997–98 season. The team finished seventh in the Premier Division, consigning Hibernian to relegation – and saving themselves – in the penultimate match of the season. In the cup competitions, United lost narrowly in the quarter-finals of the Scottish Cup to Celtic, although were soundly beaten by the same team in the final of the League Cup. In the UEFA Cup, United exited in the 1st round to Trabzonspor.

Goalkeeper Sieb Dijkstra played every minute of the 1997–98 season (49 matches)

The club reached the Final of the Youth Cup this season, playing Heart of Midlothian on 12 May at Tynecastle Park, losing 2–0. The squad from the semi-finals included future professionals Kevin McDonald, Paul Gallacher, Jim Paterson, Craig Easton and Stephen McConalogue. In addition, players such as Gareth Dailly, Barry Donachie, Steven Fallon, Paul McIlravey and Chris Devine played in lower league football. It remains the last time the club reached the Final, having played in three successive Finals between 1989 and 1991, winning in 1990 and 1991.

The club's playing kits were sponsored by Telewest for a second season.

== Season review ==
=== Europe and early season ===
United's season started in July, with a trip into the Pyrenees to play against CE Principat from Andorra in the UEFA Cup. United notched up an 8–0 lead in the first leg, with Robbie Winters and Gary McSwegan both scoring hat-tricks. The home leg was won 9–0, which left United just one goal short of Rangers' 18–0 aggregate score against Maltese team Valletta in 1983.

The league started in August with Kjell Olofsson giving United a 1–1 draw with St. Johnstone at McDiarmid Park, before Gary McSwegan scored his 3rd hat-trick in 4 games in a 4–2 win over Queen of the South at Dumfries in the League Cup. After the successes of Olofsson, Pedersen and Zetterlund during the season before, manager Tommy McLean returned to Scandinavia several times during the course of the season to add to the squad. Thomas Tengstedt and Göran Marklund were the first two to arrive, but neither player would make an impact on the first team.

The next round of the UEFA Cup saw United drawn against Turkish outfit Trabzonspor, with the away leg up first where United went down 1–0. United then drew 1–1 at home to Hibernian, before beating them after extra-time in the League Cup three days later. The next game in the League was against Rangers at Ibrox, where Marco Negri equalled Paul Sturrock's record of scoring five goals in one match, as Rangers won 5–1.

Andy McLaren scored in the 2nd leg of the UEFA Cup tie against Trabzonspor at Tannadice, but the Turks scored again to win the tie 2–1 on aggregate and put an end to United's European adventure. United also drew 1–1 at Pittodrie against Aberdeen.

=== Cup run ===
September started with a surprise 1–0 win at Ibrox in the League Cup quarter-finals. United then lost the next three league games 2–1, with Kjell Olofsson scoring in each. During this time, Tommy McLean brought former Örebro defender Magnus Sköldmark to Tannadice after a spell in China, and former Dundee manager Jocky Scott was appointed as first team coach.

The first match in October was a remarkable game against Dunfermline at East End Park, where United went 3–0 up in the first half in gale force conditions. But playing with the wind in the 2nd half, Dunfermline pulled it back to 3–3 and Dave Bowman was sent off. United then took on Aberdeen at Tynecastle in the semi-finals of the League Cup, where Robbie Winters scored twice and Craig Easton scored his first goal for the club in a 3–1 win to take United through to the final.

This result saw United go on an unbeaten run, similar to the previous seasons run, as United beat Motherwell 4–0 at Tannadice in the next game. Robbie Winters scored his 5th goal in three games, and he scored again as Rangers visited Tannadice the following week, as United won 2–1 with Steven Pressley scoring from the penalty spot. This month saw Craig Easton win the Young Player of the Month award for October.

=== Wins, a Cup Final and defeats ===
Kjell Olofsson scored twice as United came from behind to beat Hibs 3–1 at Easter Road on the first day of November, and the manager bought yet another Scandinavian, with Mikael Andersson coming to Tannadice from Örebro. Aberdeen had failed to beat United since 1996, and their run got worse as United hammered them 5–0 at Tannadice with goals from Olofsson (2), McLaren, Zetterlund and Easton, with Dean Windass shown the red card three times before he left the pitch.

Roy Aitken followed Alex Smith, Willie Miller and Alex Miller by becoming the next Aberdeen manager to be sacked following a defeat at the hands of United. After falling out of favour with manager Tommy McLean, midfielder Grant Johnson was transferred to Huddersfield Town after spending a few months out on loan. United showed their fighting spirit in the next match against Kilmarnock at Rugby Park. After falling behind 1–0 and struggling to get back into the match, Mark Perry's scrambled equaliser sparked United into life and goals from Olofsson and McSwegan gave United their 6th straight win. Next up was the League cup final rehearsal, as United travelled through to Glasgow to face Celtic at Parkhead. a 4–0 hammering was not the best warm up for the Cup final the following week and also put an end to United's unbeaten run. Manager Tommy McLean then brought in former Arsenal and Sheffield Wednesday midfielder Siggi Jónsson but he would spend most of the season in and out of the first team due to injury.

United made the journey through to the West again just a week later, this time for the League Cup Final, held at Ibrox due to restructuring works at Hampden. After five appearances in the final of this competition during the 1980s, this was the club's first League Cup final in 11 years, and thousands of Arabs travelled through for the club's first major final since the Scottish Cup win in 1994. The United fans were in fine voice and there was a carnival atmosphere at the stadium, but the game itself was a disaster, as Celtic won easily 3–0.

Into December and United failed to score in their next three games, making it five games in a row without a goal. 0–0 draws against Dunfermline and Hearts at Tannadice was followed by a 1–0 defeat against Motherwell at Fir Park, but the side returned to winning ways with a 2–1 victory over St Johnstone at Tannadice with goals from Andy McLaren and Kjell Olofsson. The Christmas week match saw United travel through to Glasgow yet again, with another demoralising defeat, this time losing 4–1 to Rangers at Ibrox.

=== New Year ===
The first game in January saw United's first defeat by Aberdeen since 1995, with a 1–0 loss at Pittodrie, which was followed by a 1–1 draw with Kilmarnock at Tannadice where Robbie Winters scored for United. Winters scored again in the next match for his 16th goal of the season with the only goal of the game against Aberdeen at Tannadice, giving the team only their second win in 10 games. Kjell Olofsson scored as United were narrowly beaten 2–1 by Celtic at Tannadice, which was followed by a 2–0 defeat against Hearts at Tynecastle. Another signing brought ex-Trabzonspor striker Jean Jaque Misse-Misse back to Tannadice on a short-term contract, after impressing Tommy McLean in the UEFA Cup match back in August, but he failed to impress further and was released a couple of months later.

February started with a 1–0 win over Motherwell at Tannadice with Kjell Olofsson scoring his 15th goal of the season and United also saw off Inverness Caledonian Thistle 3–2 in a Scottish Cup replay. Gary McSwegan scored twice in a 2–2 draw with Dunfermline at East End Park, before an Andy Dow own goal gave United a 1–1 draw with Hibs at Tannadice. Robbie Winters scored in a 1–1 draw with St. Johnstone which gave United a six-game unbeaten run during the month of February.

The first match in March saw Celtic come to Tannadice for the 4th round of the Scottish Cup. A fantastic match saw Kjell Olofsson put United in front before Celtic went 2–1 up. Olofsson looked to have taken the tie to a reply with an equaliser, but a late Erik Pedersen own goal put Celtic through as United narrowly lost 3–2. After six straight defeats to Celtic in all competitions, a late Kjell Olofsson goal at Parkhead gave United a much deserved 1–1 draw in the league.

The good result in Glasgow was followed by two bad ones, with 1–0 defeats against Hearts and Motherwell. The game at Motherwell saw Iain Jenkins and Julian Alsford make their debuts after arriving from Chester City. Tommy McLean would also bring in Emanuel Omoyimni, Wayne Gill and Óscar Valles – all on loan or short-term deals – but none would make an impact on the first team.

=== Relegation battle ===
April started with another 2–2 draw with Dunfermline, with Maurice Malpas and Kjell Olofsson scoring at Tannadice, which was followed by a 0–0 home draw with Aberdeen and a 1–0 defeat away to Kilmarnock. a 2–0 defeat at home to St. Johnstone meant that United had won only 3 in 22 League matches, and were now facing a tough relegation battle with Hibs with only two games to go, with Hibs being the next opponents.

If United were to lose the match at Easter Road, they would have to take all three points from Rangers in the last game to have any chance of survival. With the League title yet to be decided, Rangers could still win the championship at Tannadice, so a United victory at Easter Road was vital. Kjell Olofsson yet again showed what a crucial part of the team he was as he scored twice as United fought back from 1–0 down to win the match, survive relegation and put Hibs down.

The final game of the season in May was now not so important to United after their win over Hibs, but Rangers still had the chance of winning the League. Rangers won 2–1, but Celtic's 2–0 victory won them the League Championship, and stopped Rangers from winning their 10th title in a row.

== Fixtures and results ==
All results are written with Dundee United's score first.

=== Scottish Premier Division ===
| Date | Opponent | Venue | Result | Attendance | Scorers |
|---|---|---|---|---|---|
| 2 August 1997 | St Johnstone | A | 1–1 | 6,592 | Olofsson |
| 17 August 1997 | Hibernian | H | 1–1 | 7,344 | Winters |
| 23 August 1997 | Rangers | A | 1–5 | 48,599 | Pressley |
| 30 August 1997 | Aberdeen | A | 1–1 | 12,060 | Winters |
| 13 September 1997 | Kilmarnock | H | 1–2 | 6,883 | Olofsson |
| 20 September 1997 | Heart of Midlothian | A | 1–2 | 13,415 | Olofsson |
| 27 September 1997 | Celtic | H | 1–2 | 11,376 | Olofsson |
| 4 October 1997 | Dunfermline Athletic | A | 3–3 | 5,829 | Winters (2), McLaren |
| 18 October 1997 | Motherwell | H | 4–0 | 7,337 | Olofsson, Winters, McSwegan, McLaren |
| 25 October 1997 | Rangers | H | 2–1 | 12,335 | Winters, Pressley |
| 1 November 1997 | Hibernian | A | 3–1 | 11,110 | Olofsson (2), McSwegan |
| 9 November 1997 | Aberdeen | H | 5–0 | 7,893 | Olofsson, Zetterlund, McLaren, Easton |
| 15 November 1997 | Kilmarnock | A | 3–1 | 7,402 | Perry, McSwegan, Olofsson |
| 22 November 1997 | Celtic | A | 0–4 | 48,581 | |
| 6 December 1997 | Dunfermline Athletic | H | 0–0 | 6,685 | |
| 9 December 1997 | Heart of Midlothian | H | 0–0 | 10,402 | |
| 13 December 1997 | Motherwell | A | 0–1 | 4,555 | |
| 20 December 1997 | St Johnstone | H | 2–1 | 7,342 | McLaren, Olofsson |
| 27 December 1997 | Rangers | A | 1–4 | 50,317 | Olofsson |
| 3 January 1998 | Aberdeen | A | 0–1 | 17,025 | |
| 10 January 1998 | Kilmarnock | H | 1–1 | 7,541 | Winters |
| 27 January 1998 | Celtic | H | 1–2 | 14,004 | Olofsson |
| 31 January 1998 | Heart of Midlothian | A | 0–2 | 14,414 | |
| 7 February 1998 | Motherwell | H | 1–0 | 6,532 | Olofsson |
| 21 February 1998 | Dunfermline Athletic | A | 2–2 | 5,250 | McSwegan (2) |
| 24 February 1998 | Hibernian | H | 1–1 | 7,989 | Dow |
| 28 February 1998 | St Johnstone | A | 1–1 | 5,637 | Winters |
| 15 March 1998 | Celtic | A | 1–1 | 48,656 | Olofsson |
| 21 March 1998 | Heart of Midlothian | H | 0–1 | 10,300 | |
| 28 March 1998 | Motherwell | A | 0–1 | 5,012 | |
| 7 April 1998 | Dunfermline Athletic | H | 2–2 | 7,769 | Olofsson, Malpas |
| 11 April 1998 | Aberdeen | H | 0–0 | 9,155 | |
| 18 April 1998 | Kilmarnock | A | 0–1 | 7,246 | |
| 25 April 1998 | St Johnstone | H | 0–2 | 8,045 | |
| 29 April 1998 | Hibernian | A | 2–1 | 13,413 | Olofsson (2) |
| 9 May 1998 | Rangers | H | 0–1 | 14,200 | |

=== Scottish Cup ===
| Date | Round | Opponent | Venue | Result | Attendance | Scorers |
|---|---|---|---|---|---|---|
| 24 January 1998 | Third round | Aberdeen | H | 1–0 | 11,488 | Winters |
| 14 February 1998 | Fourth round | Inverness CT | H | 1–1 | 8,770 | Olofsson |
| 18 February 1998 | Fourth round replay | Inverness CT | A | 3–2 | 5,821 | Olofsson, McSwegan, Zetterlund |
| 8 March 1998 | Quarter–finals | Celtic | H | 2–3 | 12,640 | Olofsson (2) |

=== Scottish League Cup ===
| Date | Round | Opponent | Venue | Result | Attendance | Scorers |
|---|---|---|---|---|---|---|
| 9 August 1997 | Second round | Queen of the South | A | 4–2 | 2,438 | McSwegan (3), Thompson |
| 20 August 1997 | Third round | Hibernian | H | 2–1 | 7,692 | Zetterlund, McSwegan |
| 9 September 1997 | Quarter–finals | Rangers | A | 1–0 | 44,440 | McSwegan |
| 15 October 1997 | Semi–finals | Aberdeen | N | 3–1 | 10,459 | Winters (2), Easton |
| 15 October 1997 | Final | Celtic | N | 0–3 | 49,305 | |

=== UEFA Cup ===
| Date | Round | Opponent | Venue | Result | Attendance | Scorers |
|---|---|---|---|---|---|---|
| 23 July 1997 | First qualifying round 1st leg | (Andorra) CE Principat | A | 8–0 | 700 | Winters (4), McSwegan (3), Zetterlund |
| 30 July 1997 | First qualifying round 2nd leg | (Andorra) CE Principat | H | 9–0 | 8,695 | McSwegan (3), Winters (2), McLaren, Olofsson, Zetterlund, Thompson |
| 12 September 1997 | Second qualifying round 1st leg | (Turkey) Trabzonspor | A | 0–1 | 16,000 | |
| 26 September 1997 | Second qualifying round 2nd leg | (Turkey) Trabzonspor | H | 1–1 | 10,232 | McLaren |

== Player statistics ==
During the 1997–98 season, United used 30 different players comprising 11 nationalities. The table below shows the number of appearances and goals scored by each player.

| No. | Pos | Nat | Player | Total | | Premier Division | | Scottish Cup | | League Cup | | UEFA Cup | |
| No. | Pos | Nat | Player | Apps | Goals | Apps | Goals | Apps | Goals | Apps | Goals | Apps | Goals |
|---|---|---|---|---|---|---|---|---|---|---|---|---|---|
| | GK | (Netherlands) NED | Sieb Dijkstra | 49 | 0 | 36 | 0 | 4 | 0 | 5 | 0 | 4 | 0 |
| | DF | (England) ENG | Julian Alsford | 4 | 0 | 4 | 0 | 0 | 0 | 0 | 0 | 0 | 0 |
| | DF | (Scotland) SCO | Neil Duffy | 10 | 0 | 7 | 0 | 0 | 0 | 1 | 0 | 2 | 0 |
| | DF | (Northern Ireland) NIR | Iain Jenkins | 7 | 0 | 7 | 0 | 0 | 0 | 0 | 0 | 0 | 0 |
| | DF | (Scotland) SCO | Maurice Malpas | 44 | 1 | 31 | 1 | 4 | 0 | 5 | 0 | 4 | 0 |
| | DF | (Scotland) SCO | Stewart McKimmie | 7 | 0 | 4 | 0 | 0 | 0 | 0 | 0 | 3 | 0 |
| | DF | (Norway) NOR | Erik Pedersen | 45 | 0 | 32 | 0 | 4 | 0 | 5 | 0 | 4 | 0 |
| | DF | (Scotland) SCO | Mark Perry | 45 | 1 | 32 | 1 | 4 | 0 | 5 | 0 | 4 | 0 |
| | DF | (Scotland) SCO | Steven Pressley | 41 | 2 | 29 | 2 | 4 | 0 | 5 | 0 | 3 | 0 |
| | DF | (Iceland) ISL | Sigurður Jónsson | 17 | 0 | 15 | 0 | 2 | 0 | 0 | 0 | 0 | 0 |
| | DF | (Sweden) SWE | Magnus Sköldmark | 25 | 0 | 19 | 0 | 4 | 0 | 2 | 0 | 0 | 0 |
| | MF | (Sweden) SWE | Mikael Andersson | 6 | 0 | 3 | 0 | 3 | 0 | 0 | 0 | 0 | 0 |
| | MF | (Scotland) SCO | Dave Bowman | 28 | 0 | 19 | 0 | 1 | 0 | 4 | 0 | 4 | 0 |
| | MF | (Republic of Ireland) IRL | Jimmy Crawford | 1 | 0 | 1 | 0 | 0 | 0 | 0 | 0 | 0 | 0 |
| | MF | (Scotland) SCO | Jamie Dolan | 35 | 0 | 26 | 0 | 3 | 0 | 3 | 0 | 3 | 0 |
| | MF | (Scotland) SCO | Craig Easton | 35 | 2 | 29 | 1 | 1 | 0 | 4 | 1 | 1 | 0 |
| | MF | (England) ENG | Wayne Gill | 2 | 0 | 2 | 0 | 0 | 0 | 0 | 0 | 0 | 0 |
| | MF | (Scotland) SCO | Ray McKinnon | 12 | 0 | 9 | 0 | 2 | 0 | 1 | 0 | 0 | 0 |
| | MF | (Scotland) SCO | Andy McLaren | 39 | 6 | 27 | 4 | 4 | 0 | 4 | 0 | 4 | 2 |
| | MF | (Nigeria) NGR | Emmanuel Omoyinmi | 5 | 0 | 4 | 0 | 1 | 0 | 0 | 0 | 0 | 0 |
| | MF | (Scotland) SCO | David Sinclair | 4 | 0 | 4 | 0 | 0 | 0 | 0 | 0 | 0 | 0 |
| | FW | (Scotland) SCO | Gary McSwegan | 42 | 17 | 31 | 5 | 3 | 1 | 4 | 5 | 4 | 6 |
| | FW | (Sweden) SWE | Göran Marklund | 4 | 0 | 3 | 0 | 1 | 0 | 0 | 0 | 0 | 0 |
| | FW | (Cameroon) CMR | Jean-Jacques Missé-Missé | 6 | 0 | 4 | 0 | 2 | 0 | 0 | 0 | 0 | 0 |
| | FW | (Sweden) SWE | Kjell Olofsson | 45 | 23 | 32 | 18 | 4 | 4 | 5 | 0 | 4 | 1 |

=== Goalscorers ===
United had 10 players score with the team scoring 78 goals in total. The top goalscorer was Kjell Olofsson, who finished the season with 23 goals.

| Name | League | Cups | Total |
|---|---|---|---|
| Kjell Olofsson | 18 | 5 | 23 |
| Robbie Winters | 9 | 8 | 17 |
| Gary McSwegan | 5 | 12 | 17 |
| Andy McLaren | 4 | 2 | 6 |
| Lars Zetterlund | 2 | 4 | 6 |
| Steven Pressley | 2 | 0 | 2 |
| Craig Easton | 1 | 1 | 2 |
| Steven Thompson | 0 | 2 | 2 |
| Maurice Malpas | 1 | 0 | 1 |
| Mark Perry | 1 | 0 | 1 |

=== Discipline ===
United had three players sent off and seventeen players received at least one caution, replicating last season's statistics. In total, the team received three red cards and 61 bookings.

| Name | Cautions | Dismissals |
|---|---|---|
| Maurice Malpas | (yellow card) 7 | (red card) 1 |
| Erik Pedersen | (yellow card) 6 | (red card) 1 |
| Dave Bowman | (yellow card) 5 | (red card) 1 |
| Gary McSwegan | (yellow card) 6 | |
| Jamie Dolan | (yellow card) 5 | |
| Andy McLaren | (yellow card) 5 | |
| Sigurður Jónsson | (yellow card) 4 | |
| Mark Perry | (yellow card) 4 | |
| Magnus Sköldmark | (yellow card) 4 | |
| Lars Zetterlund | (yellow card) 4 | |
| Sieb Dijkstra | (yellow card) 3 | |
| Craig Easton | (yellow card) 2 | |
| Ray McKinnon | (yellow card) 2 | |
| Julian Alsford | (yellow card) 1 | |
| Mikael Andersson | (yellow card) 1 | |
| Steven Thompson | (yellow card) 1 | |
| Robbie Winters | (yellow card) 1 | |

UEFA Cup statistics are not available

== Competitions ==
=== League table ===
| Pos | Team | Pld | W | D | L | GF | GA | GD | Pts |
|---|---|---|---|---|---|---|---|---|---|
| 5 | St Johnstone | 36 | 13 | 9 | 14 | 38 | 42 | −4 | 48 |
| 6 | Aberdeen | 36 | 9 | 12 | 15 | 39 | 53 | −14 | 39 |
| 7 | Dundee United | 36 | 8 | 13 | 15 | 43 | 51 | −8 | 37 |
| 8 | Dunfermline Athletic | 36 | 8 | 13 | 15 | 43 | 68 | −25 | 37 |
| 9 | Motherwell | 36 | 9 | 7 | 20 | 46 | 64 | −18 | 34 |

Source: Rec.Sport.Soccer Statistics Foundation
Rules for classification: 1) Points; 2) Goal difference; 3) Goals scored

== Transfers ==
=== In ===
| Date | Player | From | Fee |
|---|---|---|---|
| 16 August 1997 | (Sweden) Göran Marklund | (Sweden) Vasalunds IF | Unknown |
| 19 September 1997 | (Sweden) Magnus Sköldmark | (China) Dalian Wanda | Free |
| 3 November 1997 | (Sweden) Mikael Andersson | (Sweden) Örebro SK | Unknown |
| 21 November 1997 | (Iceland) Sigurður Jónsson | (Sweden) Örebro SK | £75,000 |
| 3 January 1998 | (Cameroon) Jean-Jacques Missé-Missé | (Turkey) Trabzonspor | Free |
| 20 February 1998 | (Nigeria) Emmanuel Omoyinmi | (England) West Ham United | Loan |
| 20 February 1998 | (Republic of Ireland) Jimmy Crawford | (England) Newcastle United | Loan |
| 26 March 1998 | (England) Julian Alsford | (England) Chester City | £100,000 |
| 26 March 1998 | (Republic of Ireland) Iain Jenkins | (England) Chester City | £100,000 |
| 31 March 1998 | (England) Wayne Gill | (England) Blackburn Rovers | Loan |

=== Out ===
| Date | Player | To | Fee |
|---|---|---|---|
| 9 September 1997 | (Scotland) Marino Keith | (Scotland) Falkirk | £40,000 |
| 15 November 1997 | (Scotland) Grant Johnson | (England) Huddersfield | £90,000 |
| 3 December 1997 | (Sweden) Mikael Andersson | Released | Free |
| 13 March 1998 | (Cameroon) Jean-Jacques Missé-Missé | (England) Chesterfield | Free |
