= New Firm (Scotland) =

Rivalry between Aberdeen and Dundee United football clubs

- Location: North East Scotland
- Teams: Aberdeen; Dundee United
- Latest meeting: 24 October 2026; Scottish Premiership; Dundee United 3–2 Aberdeen

Statistics
- Total meetings: 259
- Most wins: Aberdeen (102)

Aberdeen	Dundee United

The New Firm is the term used, hailing from the 1980s, to describe the rivalry between Scottish football clubs Aberdeen and Dundee United. Both clubs are located on the east coast of Scotland, in the third and fourth most populous cities respectively.

Although not traditionally a derby, with 65 miles separating both teams, the fixture was seen as a North-east of Scotland derby between the two most successful teams in Scotland outside of the Old Firm during the 1980s. Dundee United also have a more traditional rivalry with their close neighbours Dundee.

== History ==
The term originated in the 1980s, when both clubs challenged the Old Firm for domestic trophies. The term was used by Evening Times and The Glasgow Herald.

The Old Firm have more often than not been the dominant force in Scottish Football, however throughout the 1980s both Aberdeen and Dundee United were more than a match for them, regularly beating them home and away and winning many of the trophies on offer.

Aberdeen were to win the Scottish Premier Division three times, the Scottish Cup four times, the Scottish League Cup twice, the European Cup Winners' Cup and the European Super Cup, all within the 1980s. In this same period, Dundee United won the Scottish Premier Division once and the Scottish League Cup twice, as well as reaching the Scottish Cup final four times, the 1987 UEFA Cup Final, and the semi-final of the 1983–84 European Cup. Not only were the Old Firm not dominating the title race, but for three seasons in a row, 1983 through to 1985, the league title went to either Aberdeen or Dundee United, meaning for the first time two other teams were dominating Scottish Football.

Both sides' success was limited as they entered the 1990s, with Aberdeen winning both cups in 1989–90, reaching both finals in 1992–93, as well as almost winning the league in 1991, while Dundee United were Scottish Cup finalists in 1991 and finally winners in 1994. However, in the 1994–95 season both sides fought relegation (with United going down), and although Aberdeen won the Scottish League Cup in 1995 and Dundee United the Scottish Cup again in 2010, neither side has managed to be a consistent force for Rangers and Celtic to reckon with, and Aberdeen's league success in 1984–85 is the last time a non-Old Firm club won the Scottish league title.

Since 2010 however, the sides have seen a divergence in fortunes, as Aberdeen capitalised on Rangers' implosion to win the Scottish League Cup in 2014 and finish runners-up behind Celtic for four years running between 2014–15 and 2017–18 (losing three cup finals to the same club in that period), while Dundee United were relegated from the top flight in 2016 having lost the 2014 Scottish Cup Final to a local rival, St Johnstone.

=== Domestic head-to-head ===
In domestic head-to-head matches, the teams have played each other 254 times, Aberdeen winning 101 compared to United's 82. Aberdeen have won more league and Scottish Cup matches while United have won more League Cup matches between the two.

Given their mutual success particularly in the 1980s, it is perhaps surprising that the only major final featuring both clubs is the 1979–80 Scottish League Cup Final, won by Dundee United in a replay at Dens Park after a draw in Glasgow.

After 17 May 2025:

Team	League	Scottish Cup	League Cup	Total
Aberdeen	80	12	9	101
Draw	57	9	5	71
Dundee United	64	7	11	82
Totals	201	28	25	254

=== League competition ===
Scottish Premiership Table (2013/14-present – 5 Seasons)

As of 16 May 2018:

Club	Seasons	Played	W	D	L	GF	GA	GD	Pts
Aberdeen	5	190	111	30	49	302	191	111	363
Dundee United	3	114	41	22	51	168	176	−8	142

SPL Table (1998/99-2012/13 – 15 Seasons)

Club	Seasons	Played	W	D	L	GF	GA	GD	Pts
Aberdeen	15	566	188	143	235	651	785	−134	707
Dundee United	15	566	173	162	231	674	845	−171	681

=== European competition ===
As of 9 August 2012:

Team	T	P	W	D	L	F	A
Dundee United	26	110	46	30	34	168	116
Aberdeen	27	109	44	28	37	160	130

== Players at both clubs ==
Nine players have signed for Dundee United directly from Aberdeen, the last being in 2000. Ten have made the opposite journey from Tannadice to Pittodrie, with five since August 2005.

=== Aberdeen to Dundee United ===
Date	Player	Fee
1964	(Scotland) Lewis Thom	Unknown
1976	(Scotland) Billy Williamson	Unknown
1 July 1983	(Scotland) John Gardiner	Unknown
5 November 1995	(Scotland) Ray McKinnon	£200,000
19 March 1997	(Scotland) Stewart McKimmie	Free
1 July 1998	(Scotland) Joe Miller	Free
23 September 1998	(Scotland) Billy Dodds	Swap
19 January 2000	(Scotland) Jim Hamilton	£150,000
8 June 2000	(Scotland) Jamie Buchan	Free
31 January 2019	(Scotland) Mark Reynolds	Loan

=== Dundee United to Aberdeen ===
Date	Player	Fee
Oct 1966	(Scotland) Frank Munro	£10,000
9 January 1974	(Scotland) Jim Henry	£20,000
28 March 1992	(Finland) Mixu Paatelainen	£400,000
2 June 1998	(Scotland) Mark Perry	Free
23 September 1998	(Scotland) Robbie Winters	£700,000
31 August 2005	(Scotland) Stevie Crawford	Free
31 August 2006	(Scotland) Lee Miller	Free
1 June 2007	(Scotland) Lee Mair	Free
18 January 2008	(Scotland) Stuart Duff	Free
7 July 2008	(Scotland) Mark Kerr	Free

=== Complete list ===
In addition, other players have played for both clubs without moving directly between them. A list of all players to have played at least one first-team game for both clubs is displayed below.

(Scotland) Scottish

- Jim Bett
- Craig Brewster
- Jamie Buchan
- Stevie Crawford
- Billy Dodds
- Davie Dodds
- Stuart Duff
- Fraser Fyvie
- John Gardiner
- David Goodwillie
- Jim Hamilton
- Jim Henry
- Mark Kerr
- Lee Mair
- Stewart McKimmie

- Gary Mackay-Steven
- Ray McKinnon
- Jamie McQuilken
- Joe Miller
- Lee Miller
- Charlie Mulgrew
- Frank Munro
- Mark Perry
- Barry Robson
- Cammy Smith
- Derek Stillie
- Lewis Thom
- Billy Williamson
- Robbie Winters
- Stephen Wright
- Lawrence Shankland
- Peter Pawlett

(Finland) Finnish

- Mixu Paatelainen

Republic of Ireland

- Willo Flood
- Jamie McGrath

(Northern Ireland) Northern Irish

- Danny Griffin
- Michael O'Neill

== Player records ==
A list of players to have scored in derby matches between the two from 27 August 1994 up to 20 November 2021 is below:

=== For both clubs ===
Scorer	Goals
(Scotland) Robbie Winters	14
(Scotland) Billy Dodds	10
(Scotland) Barry Robson	6
(Scotland) Stevie Crawford	4
(Scotland) Gary Mackay-Steven	3
(Scotland) Lee Miller	3

=== Aberdeen goalscorers ===
Scorer	Goals
(Scotland) Darren Mackie	8
(Norway) Arild Stavrum	7
(Scotland) Robbie Winters	7
(Republic of Ireland) Adam Rooney	5
(England) Scott Vernon	5
(Scotland) Barry Nicholson	4
(Scotland) Derek Young	4
(Scotland) Stevie Crawford	3
(Scotland) Zander Diamond	3
(Scotland) Billy Dodds	3
(Northern Ireland) Niall McGinn	3
(Scotland) Phil McGuire	3
(Scotland) Paul Sheerin	3
(England) Dean Windass	3
(Iceland) Kári Árnason	2
(Scotland) Scott Booth	2
(Scotland) Andrew Considine	2
(Republic of Ireland) Jonny Hayes	2
(Scotland) Eoin Jess	2
(Scotland) Paul Kane	2
(Scotland) Kenny McLean	2
(Scotland) Gary Mackay-Steven	2
(Scotland) Lee Miller	2
(Scotland) Scott Severin	2
(Scotland) Steve Tosh	2
(Morocco) Hicham Zerouali	2
(North Macedonia) Bojan Miovski	2
(Nigeria) Sone Aluko	1
(Morocco) Rachid Belabed	1
(Republic of Ireland) Richie Byrne	1
(Scotland) Chris Clark	1
(Algeria) Mohamed Chalali	1
(Wales) Simon Church	1
(Montserrat) Donervon Daniels	1
(Scotland) Andy Dow	1
(Scotland) Ricky Foster	1
(Scotland) Brian Grant	1
(England) Leigh Hinds	1
(Scotland) Ryan Jack	1
(Bulgaria) Ilian Kiriakov	1
(France) Toni Kombouaré	1
(England) Steve Lovell	1
(Northern Ireland) Josh Magennis	1
(Scotland) Chris Maguire	1
(France) Youl Mawéné	1
(England) Leon Mike	1
(Scotland) Charlie Mulgrew	1
(Scotland) Michael Paton	1
(Scotland) Peter Pawlett	1
(United States) Christian Ramirez	1
(Scotland) Barry Robson	1
(Scotland) Duncan Shearer	1
(Scotland) Jamie Smith	1
(Norway) Thomas Solberg	1
(Scotland) John Stewart	1
(Netherlands) Karim Touzani	1
(Democratic Republic of the Congo) Calvin Zola	1
(Cape Verde) Luis Lopes	1
(Scotland) Ross McCrorie	1
(Wales) Marley Watkins	1
Own goals	3

=== Dundee United goalscorers ===
Scorer	Goals
(Sweden) Kjell Olofsson	8
(Scotland) Billy Dodds	7
(Scotland) Robbie Winters	7
(Republic of Ireland) Jon Daly	6
(Scotland) Craig Easton	5
(Scotland) Barry Robson	5
(Scotland) David Hannah	4
(Scotland) David Goodwillie	3
(Scotland) Andy McLaren	3
(Spain) Francisco Sandaza	3
(Scotland) Marc McNulty	3
(Scotland) Alan Archibald	2
(Scotland) Greg Cameron	2
(Scotland) Craig Conway	2
(Spain) David Fernandez	2
(Senegal) Morgaro Gomis	2
(Scotland) James Grady	2
(Republic of Ireland) Noel Hunt	2
(Scotland) Gary McSwegan	2
(Scotland) Charlie Miller	2
(Scotland) Joe Miller	2
(Scotland) Steven Pressley	2
(Scotland) David Robertson	2
(Trinidad and Tobago) Collin Samuel	2
(Scotland) Danny Swanson	2
(Scotland) Steven Thompson	2
(England) Rory Boulding	1
(Scotland) Craig Brewster	1
(Argentina) Damian Casalinuovo	1
(Turkey) Nadir Çiftçi	1
(Scotland) Stevie Crawford	1
(Finland) Lauri Dalla Valle	1
(Republic of Ireland) Seán Dillon	1
(Scotland) Darren Dods	1
(Scotland) Barry Douglas	1
(Scotland) Ryan Dow	1
(England) Ryan Edwards	1
(Scotland) Chris Erskine	1
(Northern Ireland) Warren Feeney	1
(Portugal) Joaquim Ferraz	1
(Northern Ireland) Danny Griffin	1
(Republic of Ireland) Gavin Gunning	1
(Scotland) Jim Hamilton	1
(United States) Ian Harkes	1
(Norway) Christian Kalvenes	1
(Scotland) Derek Lilley	1
(Scotland) Stephen McConalogue	1
(Scotland) Jim McIntyre	1
(Scotland) Paul McMullan	1
(Scotland) Gary Mackay-Steven	1
(Scotland) Lee Miller	1
(Northern Ireland) Callum Morris	1
(Scotland) Robbie Muirhead	1
(Scotland) Jim Paterson	1
(Northern Ireland) Paul Paton	1
(Scotland) John Rankin	1
(Trinidad and Tobago) Jason Scotland	1
(Scotland) John Souttar	1
(Argentina) Adrián Spörle	1
(Scotland) Sam Stanton	1
(Greece) Tassos Venetis	1
(Scotland) Brian Welsh	1
(Scotland) Mark Wilson	1
(Sweden) Lars Zetterlund	1
(Australia) Aziz Behich	1
(Scotland) Tony Watt	1
(Republic of Ireland) Jamie McGrath	1
Own goals	3

== Partial game list ==
Fixtures from 27 August 1994 to the present day featuring League games, Scottish Cup and League Cup matches. Aberdeen wins are coloured in red, United wins in tangerine and draws are grey.

Date	Competition	Venue	Result	Crowd	Scorers (Aberdeen)	Scorers (United)
27 August 1994	Premier Division	Tannadice	2–1	9,332	Grant	Welsh, Brewster
29 October 1994	Premier Division	Pittodrie	3–0	11,744	Kane (2), Booth	
2 January 1995	Premier Division	Tannadice	0–0	10,560		
6 May 1995	Premier Division	Pittodrie	2–1	20,124	Dodds, Shearer	Winters
28 September 1996	Premier Division	Tannadice	1–0	10,359		McSwegan
16 November 1996	Premier Division	Pittodrie	3–3	13,807	Kiriakov, Kombouaré, Dodds	McLaren, Winters, Olofsson
1 January 1997	Premier Division	Tannadice	4–0	9,736		Winters, Pressley (2), Olofsson
15 March 1997	Premier Division	Pittodrie	1–1	13,645	Windass	Olofsson
30 August 1997	Premier Division	Pittodrie	1–1	12,060	Dodds	Winters
15 October 1997	League Cup SF	Tynecastle	1–3	10,456	Windass	Winters (2), Easton
9 November 1997	Premier Division	Tannadice	5–0	7,893		Olofsson (2), Zetterlund, McLaren, Easton
3 January 1998	Premier Division	Pittodrie	1–0	17,025	Windass	
24 January 1998	Scottish Cup R3	Tannadice	1–0	11,488		Winters
11 April 1998	Premier Division	Tannadice	0–0	9,155		
4 October 1998	Premier League	Tannadice	1–0	8,933		McSwegan
28 November 1998	Premier League	Pittodrie	0–3	11,964		Olofsson, J.Miller, Easton
20 February 1999	Premier League	Tannadice	3–0	8,309		Olofsson, Dodds, Hannah
17 April 1999	Premier League	Pittodrie	0–4	11,603		Dodds (2), J.Miller, Olofsson
18 September 1999	Premier League	Pittodrie	1–2	11,814	Dow	Hannah, Dodds
6 November 1999	Premier League	Tannadice	3–1	8,170	Solberg	Dodds (2), Paterson
27 December 1999	Premier League	Pittodrie	3–1	16,656	Zerouali, Belabed, Stavrum	Hannah
13 February 2000	League Cup SF	Dens	1–0	9,500	Stavrum	
12 March 2000	Scottish Cup QF	Tannadice	0–1	6,738	Jess	
25 March 2000	Premier League	Tannadice	1–1	6,723	Stavrum	Ferraz
23 September 2000	Premier League	Tannadice	3–5	7,699	Winters (3), Young, Jess	Easton, McConalogue, Hannah
17 March 2001	Premier League	Tannadice	1–1	8,457	Winters	C.Miller
4 April 2001	Premier League	Pittodrie	4–1	9,962	Stavrum (3), Young	Griffin
20 May 2001	Premier League	Pittodrie	1–2	11,633	Stavrum	Venetis, Lilley
15 September 2001	Premier League	Pittodrie	2–1	12,948	Winters, Zerouali	McIntyre
15 December 2001	Premier League	Tannadice	1–1	9,129	Winters	Easton
16 February 2002	Premier League	Pittodrie	4–0	13,612	Winters, Young (2), Mike	
11 September 2002	Premier League	Pittodrie	1–2	10,724	Mackie	Thompson (2)
30 November 2002	Premier League	Tannadice	1–1	8,621	McGuire	Hamilton
16 February 2003	Premier League	Pittodrie	3–0	9,146	Sheerin (2), McGuire	
24 May 2003	Premier League	Tannadice	0–2	8,516	Mackie, Tosh	
18 October 2003	Premier League	Pittodrie	0–1	11,234		McLaren
17 January 2004	Premier League	Tannadice	3–2	8,888	Booth, Clark	Robson, C.Miller, Dodds
3 April 2004	Premier League	Pittodrie	3–0	8,449	Hinds, McGuire, Sheerin	
11 September 2004	Premier League	Tannadice	1–1	10,995	Mackie	Wilson
27 November 2004	Premier League	Pittodrie	1–0	12,038	Tosh	
27 February 2005	Scottish Cup QF	Tannadice	4–1	8,661	Byrne	Archibald, Grady (2), Crawford
2 March 2005	Premier League	Tannadice	1–2	6,688	Diamond, Stewart	Scotland
30 July 2005	Premier League	Tannadice	1–1	12,404	Nicholson	L.Miller
25 October 2005	Premier League	Pittodrie	2–0	10,720	Smith, Crawford	
7 January 2006	Scottish Cup R3	Tannadice	2–3	8,218	Crawford (2), Nicholson	Fernandez (2)
21 January 2006	Premier League	Tannadice	1–1	9,936	Mackie	Archibald
21 October 2006	Premier League	Pittodrie	3–1	10,747	Mackie, Nicholson (2)	Robson
30 December 2006	Premier League	Tannadice	3–1	12,329	Severin	Samuel (2), Robson
7 April 2007	Premier League	Pittodrie	2–4	12,148	Lovell, Mackie	Daly, Hunt, Cameron (2)
4 August 2007	Premier League	Tannadice	1–0	12,496		D.Robertson
3 November 2007	Premier League	Pittodrie	2–0	11,964	Aluko, L.Miller	
19 January 2008	Premier League	Tannadice	3–0	8,579		Hunt, Robson (2)
5 February 2008	League Cup SF	Tynecastle	1–4	12,046	Considine	Dods, Kalvenes, Conway, Gomis
3 May 2008	Premier League	Pittodrie	2–1	10,312	Foster, Touzani	Swanson
20 September 2008	Premier League	Pittodrie	0–1	11,041		Sandaza
8 November 2008	Premier League	Tannadice	2–1	9,490	Mackie	Sandaza, Feeney
21 February 2009	Premier League	Pittodrie	2–2	14,673	Severin, Diamond	Sandaza, D.Robertson
7 May 2009	Premier League	Tannadice	1–1	10,407	L.Miller	Goodwillie
24 October 2009	Premier League	Pittodrie	0–2	11,776		Casalinuovo, Gomis
2 January 2010	Premier League	Tannadice	0–1	10,032	Mulgrew	
20 March 2010	Premier League	Pittodrie	2–2	9,316	Diamond, Paton	Daly (2)
11 September 2010	Premier League	Tannadice	3–1	9,793	Vernon	Daly, Howard, og, Goodwillie
1 January 2011	Premier League	Pittodrie	1–1	12,487	Maguire	Goodwillie
7 March 2011	Premier League	Tannadice	3–1	7,416	Magennis	Douglas, Conway, Swanson
15 October 2011	Premier League	Pittodrie	3–1	10,256	Árnason, Mawéné, Considine	Dalla Valle
2 January 2012	Premier League	Tannadice	1–2	11,471	Chalali, Árnason	Daly
7 April 2012	Premier League	Pittodrie	3–1	8,439	Mackie, Clark, Jack	Daly
20 October 2012	Premier League	Tannadice	1–1	9,858	McGinn	Rankin
2 January 2013	Premier League	Pittodrie	2–2	13,176	Vernon, McGinn	Gunning, Langfield, og
6 April 2013	Premier League	Tannadice	1–0	8,577		Boulding
19 October 2013	Premiership	Pittodrie	1–0	12,654	Zola	
1 January 2014	Premiership	Tannadice	1–2	12,601	Robson, Pawlett	Souttar
29 March 2014	Premiership	Pittodrie	1–1	14,627	McGinn	Paton
6 May 2014	Premiership	Tannadice	1–3	8,677	Vernon (3)	Dillon
10 August 2014	Premiership	Pittodrie	0–3	16,471		Dow, Mackay-Steven, Erskine
13 December 2014	Premiership	Tannadice	0–2	11,196	Rooney (2)	
31 January 2015	League Cup SF	Hampden	2–1	29,608	Daniels	Morris, Ciftci
18 April 2015	Premiership	Pittodrie	1–0	12,619	Rooney	
2 May 2015	Premiership	Tannadice	1–0	8,686		Muirhead
2 August 2015	Premiership	Tannadice	0–1	10,706	McLean	
7 November 2015	Premiership	Pittodrie	2–0	12,805	Rooney, Hayes	
2 March 2016	Premiership	Tannadice	0–1	9,737	Church	
11 February 2018	Scottish Cup R5	Pittodrie	4–2	11,611	Rooney, Mackay-Steven (2), McLean	Stanton, McMullan
17 October 2020	Premiership	Tannadice	0–0			
2 January 2021	Premiership	Pittodrie	0–0			
20 March 2021	Premiership	Tannadice	1–0			Spörle
25 April 2021	Scottish Cup QF	Pittodrie	0–3			McNulty (2), Edwards
1 August 2021	Premiership	Pittodrie	2–0	6,305	Hayes, Ramirez	
20 November 2021	Premiership	Tannadice	1–0	9,927		Harkes
26 February 2022	Premiership	Pittodrie	1–1	18,719	Edwards, og	McNulty
8 October 2022	Premiership	Tannadice	4–0	11,010		Behich, Watt, McGrath, McCrorie, og
12 November 2022	Premiership	Pittodrie	1–0	17,035	Miovski	
4 March 2023	Premiership	Tannadice	1–3	11,048	Duk, McCrorie, Watkins	McGrath
26 October 2024	Premiership	Pittodrie	1–0	19,274	Ambrose	
29 December 2024	Premiership	Tannadice	1-0	13,581		Holt
2 March 2025	Premiership	Pittodrie	2–2	17,862	Nisbet (2)	Ševelj, Dalby
17 May 2025	Premiership	Tannadice	2–1	11,490	Okkels	Gallagher, Dalby
23 September 2025	Premiership	Tannadice	2–0	11,052		Dolček, Esselink
27 December 2025	Premiership	Pittodrie	1–1		Karlsson	Fatah
24 February 2026	Premiership	Tannadice	0–0			
9 May 2026	Premiership	Pittodrie	2–0		Armstrong, Olusanya	
24 October 2026	Premiership	Tannadice	3–2		Guinness-Walker, Ronan	Iqbal, Tait, Sapsford
