= Dundee United F.C. in the 1990s =

Scottish football club seasons

This covers the seasons from 1990–91 to 1999–00 which saw the club win the Scottish Cup at the seventh attempt, lose another three Cup Finals, get relegated and win immediate promotion.

== 1990–91 ==
United finished the league season in fourth place, missing out on European football for the first time in fifteen years. In a season which saw Christian Dailly and Duncan Ferguson make their débuts, United made it to the semi-finals of the League Cup and the Scottish Cup Final, where they lost 4–3 to Motherwell in extra time.

Only one player, Gijs Steinmann, was signed during the season and he was the only departure at the end of the campaign.

Home colours	Away colours

Pos	Team	Pld	W	D	L	GF	GA	GD	Pts	Qualification or relegation
3	Celtic	36	17	7	12	52	38	+14	41	Qualification for the UEFA Cup first round
4	Dundee United	36	17	7	12	41	29	+12	41	
5	Heart of Midlothian	36	14	7	15	48	55	−7	35	

Source: Statto.com
Rules for classification: 1) points; 2) goal difference; 3) number of goals scored.

== 1991–92 ==
The club finished fourth for a second time, again missing out on a European slot and failing to get past the quarter-finals in the League Cup. Having made the Scottish Cup final last season, United fell out of the competition in the third round, going down at Celtic Park.

With youngsters Grant Johnson and Andy McLaren making their debuts this season, a host of players also left Tannadice, including Billy Thomson, Darren Jackson, Ray McKinnon and Mixu Paatelainen.

Home colours	Away colours

Pos	Team	Pld	W	D	L	GF	GA	GD	Pts	Qualification or relegation
3	Celtic	44	26	10	8	88	42	+46	62	Qualification for the UEFA Cup first round
4	Dundee United	44	19	13	12	66	50	+16	51	
5	Hibernian	44	16	17	11	53	45	+8	49	Qualification for the UEFA Cup first round

Rules for classification: 1) points; 2) goal difference; 3) number of goals scored.

== 1992–93 ==
United finished the season in fourth place for a third time in what was Jim McLean's final season in charge. During twenty years, the manager led the club to the Premier Division title and a number of domestic Cup Finals, plus the UEFA Cup Final. Ironically, after failing to win the Scottish Cup on so many occasions, the club would do it without him the following season. This season saw David Hannah and Mark Perry emerge from youth while Miodrag Krivokapic's ties were finally severed after not playing a single game the previous season due to a contract dispute.

In the cups, United made the League Cup quarter-finals again and could only make it to the Scottish Cup fourth round.

Home colours	Away colours

Pos	Team	Pld	W	D	L	GF	GA	GD	Pts	Qualification or relegation
3	Celtic	44	24	12	8	68	41	+27	60	Qualification for the UEFA Cup first round
4	Dundee United	44	19	9	16	56	49	+7	47	Qualification for the UEFA Cup first round
5	Heart of Midlothian	44	15	14	15	46	51	−5	44	Qualification for the UEFA Cup first round

Source: RSSSF
Rules for classification: 1) points; 2) goal difference; 3) number of goals scored.

== 1993–94 ==
United finished sixth in the league – their lowest finish for several years – but Ivan Golac won the Scottish Cup in his first season.

Home colours	Away colours

Pos	Team	Pld	W	D	L	GF	GA	GD	Pts	Qualification or relegation
5	Hibernian	44	16	15	13	53	48	+5	47	
6	Dundee United	44	11	20	13	47	48	−1	42	Qualification for the Cup Winners' Cup first round
7	Heart of Midlothian	44	11	20	13	37	43	−6	42	

Source: RSSSF
Rules for classification: 1) points; 2) goal difference; 3) number of goals scored.

== 1994–95 ==
United finished bottom of the Premier Division and were relegated for the first time since the division's inception in the mid-1970s. Ivan Golac was sacked towards the end of the season and the appointment of former player Billy Kirkwood failed to prevent the side being relegated on the final day of the season.

Home colours	Away colours

Pos	Team	Pld	W	D	L	GF	GA	GD	Pts	Qualification or relegation
9	Aberdeen (O)	36	10	11	15	43	46	−3	41	Qualification for the Play-off
10	Dundee United (R)	36	9	9	18	40	56	−16	36	Relegation to the 1995–96 Scottish First Division

Updated to match(es) played on end of season. Source: Soccerbase
Rules for classification: 1) Points; 2) Goal difference; 3) Goals scored
(O) Play-off winners; (R) Relegated

== 1995–96 ==
United spent heavily in an attempt to win promotion, spending nearly £2.5m during the first few months of the season, although £3.25m was brought in player sales. Gordan Petric and Billy McKinlay were the big departures, while players such as Owen Coyle and Gary McSwegan were brought in to provide attacking options, with ex-Rangers players Steven Pressley and Ally Maxwell some of the defensive signings.

United finished the season in second place, qualifying for the promotion/relegation playoff, which they won over two legs, beating Partick Thistle 3–2 on aggregate and ensuring promotion back to the Premier Division at the first attempt. The club were knocked out of the Scottish Cup by Celtic after conceding two last-minute goals to lose 2–1, while Motherwell won in the third round of the Coca-Cola Cup.

Home colours	Away colours	Third colours

Pos	Team	Pld	W	D	L	GF	GA	GD	Pts	Promotion or relegation
1	Dunfermline Athletic (C, P)	36	21	8	7	73	41	+32	71	Promotion to the Premier Division
2	Dundee United (P)	36	19	10	7	73	37	+36	67	Qualification for the Play-off
3	Greenock Morton	36	20	7	9	57	39	+18	67	

Source: RSSSF
Rules for classification: 1) points; 2) goal difference; 3) number of goals scored.
(C) Champions; (P) Promoted

== 1996–97 ==
United finished third in the Premier Division, qualifying for the UEFA Cup in the process. After a poor start to the season, Billy Kirkwood was sacked and replaced with Tommy McLean, who had taken a job with Raith Rovers only a week earlier. McLean guided United to eight successive league wins, which formed part of a thirteen-game unbeaten run in the league.

The club signed three players from Scandinavia for £0.5m, making a big impression – Kjell Olofsson, Erik Pedersen and Lars Zetterlund, with Olofsson finishing as top scorer. Players to leave included Scottish Cup winners Craig Brewster, Christian Dailly, David Hannah and Brian Welsh, bringing in over £1.25m in revenue.

Kilmarnock defeated the club in the Scottish Cup semi-final after a replay, going on to win the competition, and rivals Dundee knocked United out of the Coca-Cola Cup with a penalty shootout win in the third round.

Home colours	Away colours

Pos	Team	Pld	W	D	L	GF	GA	GD	Pts	Qualification or relegation
2	Celtic	36	23	6	7	78	32	+46	75	Qualification for the UEFA Cup first qualifying round (Note: As the League Cup winners Rangers had qualified for European competition via their league position, the place in the UEFA Cup was passed to the next highest placed team in the league, Dundee United.)
3	Dundee United	36	17	9	10	46	33	+13	60	Qualification for the UEFA Cup first qualifying round
4	Heart of Midlothian	36	14	10	12	46	43	+3	52	

Source: Soccerbase
Rules for classification: 1) Points; 2) Goal difference; 3) Goals scored

== 1997–98 ==
Home colours	Away colours	Third colours

Pos	Team	Pld	W	D	L	GF	GA	GD	Pts
6	Aberdeen	36	9	12	15	39	53	−14	39
7	Dundee United	36	8	13	15	43	51	−8	37
8	Dunfermline Athletic	36	8	13	15	43	68	−25	37

Source: Rec.Sport.Soccer Statistics Foundation
Rules for classification: 1) Points; 2) Goal difference; 3) Goals scored

== 1998–99 ==
United finished the 1998–99 SPL season in ninth place, in what was the SPL's debut season. The cup campaigns brought mixed fortunes: a League Cup third round exit to Ross County was bettered by a Scottish Cup semi-final loss to Celtic.

There was a high turnaround of players with seventeen arriving at a total cost of £1.75m and fourteen departing for a total of £0.9m. PLayers arriving included former United player David Hannah and Scotland striker Billy Dodds, who arrived – with £0.3m – as part of a swap deal for Robbie Winters.

Home colours	Away colours

Pos	Team	Pld	W	D	L	GF	GA	GD	Pts	Qualification or relegation
8	Aberdeen	36	10	7	19	43	71	−28	37	
9	Dundee United	36	8	10	18	37	48	−11	34	
10	Dunfermline Athletic (R)	36	4	16	16	28	59	−31	28	Relegation to the 1999–2000 Scottish First Division

Updated to match(es) played on end of season. Source: Soccerway and SPL official website
Rules for classification: 1) Points; 2) Goal difference; 3) Goals scored
(R) Relegated

== 1999–00 ==
United finished the season in eighth place and were knocked out of both domestic cup competitions by Aberdeen: in the League Cup semi-finals and the Scottish Cup quarter-finals, both by a score of 1–0.

United sold top scorer Billy Dodds to Rangers at the start of December and immediately the club's fortunes changed. Sitting third in the league, the club won only one of the next fourteen league games and three in total for the rest of the season. In fact, United lost 11 of the last 13 matches, consigning them to eighth place. Such was Dodds' impact that despite playing only the first four months of the season with the club, he finished top scorer with ten goals.

Home colours	Away colours

Pos	Team	Pld	W	D	L	GF	GA	GD	Pts
7	Dundee	36	12	5	19	45	64	−19	41
8	Dundee United	36	11	6	19	34	57	−23	39
9	Kilmarnock	36	8	13	15	38	52	−14	37

Updated to match(es) played on end of season. Source: Scottish Professional Football League
Rules for classification: 1) Points; 2) Goal difference; 3) Goals scored
