= 1997 Scottish League Cup final =

- Event: 1997–98 Scottish League Cup
Celtic	Dundee United
3	0
- Date: 30 November 1997
- Venue: Ibrox Stadium, Glasgow
- Man of the Match: Morten Wieghorst
- Referee: Jim McCluskey
- Attendance: 49,305

The 1997 Scottish League Cup final was played on 30 November 1997, at Ibrox Stadium in Glasgow and was the final of the 52nd Scottish League Cup competition. The final was contested by Celtic and Dundee United. Celtic won the match 3–0 thanks to goals by Marc Rieper, Henrik Larsson and Craig Burley.

== Match details ==
30 November 1997

Celtic	3–0	Dundee United
Rieper 21'; Larsson 24'; Burley 59'

Ibrox Stadium, Glasgow
Attendance: 49,305
Referee: Jim McCluskey

CELTIC:
GK	1	(Scotland) Jonathan Gould
DF	2	(Scotland) Tom Boyd (c)
DF	3	(France) Stéphane Mahé
MF	4	(Scotland) Jackie McNamara	(substituted off) 90'
DF	5	(Denmark) Marc Rieper
DF	6	(England) Alan Stubbs
FW	7	(Sweden) Henrik Larsson
MF	8	(Scotland) Craig Burley
FW	9	(Germany) Andreas Thom	(substituted off) 80'
MF	10	(Denmark) Morten Wieghorst
MF	11	(Netherlands) Regi Blinker	(substituted off) 88'
Substitutes:
FW	12	(Scotland) Simon Donnelly	(substituted on) 80'
MF	14	(Scotland) Paul Lambert	(substituted on) 88'
DF	15	(Italy) Enrico Annoni	(substituted on) 90'
Manager:
(Netherlands) Wim Jansen

DUNDEE UNITED:
GK	1	(Netherlands) Sieb Dykstra
DF	2	(Sweden) Magnus Sköldmark	(substituted off) 57'
DF	3	(Scotland) Maurice Malpas (c)
DF	4	(Scotland) Steven Pressley
DF	5	(Scotland) Mark Perry
DF	6	(Norway) Erik Pedersen
FW	7	(Sweden) Kjell Olofsson
MF	8	(Sweden) Lars Zetterlund
FW	9	(Scotland) Robbie Winters
MF	10	(Scotland) Craig Easton
MF	11	(Scotland) Dave Bowman
Substitutes:
FW	12	(Scotland) Gary McSwegan	(substituted on) 57'
MF	14	(Scotland) Jamie Dolan
MF	15	(Sweden) Mikael Andersson
Manager:
(Scotland) Tommy McLean

== See also ==
Played between same clubs:

- 2015 Scottish League Cup final
