= Sieb Dijkstra =

Dutch retired footballer

Personal information
- Full name: Sybrandus Johannes Andreas Dijkstra
- Date of birth: 20 October 1966 (age 60)
- Place of birth: Kerkrade, Netherlands
- Height: 1.96 m (6 ft 5 in)
- Position: Goalkeeper

Team information
- Current team: Fortuna Sittard (Goalkeeping coach)

Senior career*
Years	Team	Apps	(Gls)
1989–1991	Roda JC	0	(0)
1989–1990	→ AZ (loan)	11	(0)
1990–1991	→ Hasselt (loan)		
1991–1994	Motherwell	80	(0)
1994–1996	Queens Park Rangers	11	(0)
1995	→ Bristol City (loan)	8	(0)
1996	→ Wycombe Wanderers (loan)	13	(0)
1996–1999	Dundee United	86	(0)
1999	Ipswich Town	0	(0)
2000	VV Sittard		
2000–2001	RBC	34	(0)
2001–2002	Germania Teveren		
Total		243	(0)
- * Club domestic league appearances and goals

Sybrandus Johannes Andreas Dijkstra (born 20 October 1966) is a Dutch football coach and former professional footballer, who is goalkeeping coach at Fortuna Sittard.

As a player, he was a goalkeeper who notably played in the Premier League for Queens Park Rangers and in the Scottish Premiership for Motherwell and Dundee United. He also played in the Football League for Bristol City and Wycombe Wanderers, as well as in his home country for Roda JC, AZ Alkmaar, VV Sittard and RBC. He also had spells in Belgium and Germany with KSC Hasselt and Germania Teveren.

== Playing career ==
Dijkstra began his career with Roda JC but failed to make an appearance, spending time on loan at AZ and Hasselt.

In 1991, he moved to Scottish side Motherwell, where he made his debut in an August 1991 League Cup tie against Raith Rovers. He would spend the next three seasons at Fir Park, replacing Ally Maxwell in the squad and eventually winning a battle for the starting place with Billy Thomson. The club challenged for the 1993–94 Scottish Premier Division title, eventually finishing third. He was regarded as a cult hero at Motherwell.

A £250,000 move to English side Queens Park Rangers followed, but he played just 11 times in two years; the manager who signed him, Gerry Francis, soon moved on to Tottenham Hotspur and after a minor injury, Dijkstra found the new manager Ray Wilkins chose other goalkeepers ahead of him. After loan spells at other English clubs, Dijkstra moved back to Scotland with Dundee United for £50,000, reuniting with manager Tommy McLean whom he had worked under at Motherwell. Dijkstra's time in Scotland was successful again, with over 80 appearances for the Terrors, including another third-place finish in the Scottish League in 1996–97 and a Scottish League Cup runners-up medal later in 1997, after he again took the place of Ally Maxwell in the team.

After a contract dispute, Dijkstra left Tannadice in 1999 and returned to the Netherlands to play for amateur side VV Sittard (via a week's spell with Ipswich Town), although he would end the season with RBC Roosendaal as a replacement for injured Belgian goalkeeper Jurgen Belpaire. Another year with RBC followed before a final playing spell with German Verbandsliga side Germania Teveren.

== Coaching career ==
He was appointed goalkeeping coach at Fortuna Sittard in June 2017.

== Personal life ==
Dijkstra is married and has a daughter. He also has three children with his first wife. He has his own goalkeeping academy in Kerkrade. In a 2020 interview, Dijkstra reflected upon his time playing in Scotland as the happiest in his career.

== Honours ==
Dundee United

- League Cup runner-up: 1997–98
