= Magnus Sköldmark =

Swedish footballer

Personal information
- Date of birth: September 22, 1968 (age 58)
- Place of birth: Långsele, Sweden
- Height: 6 ft 1 in (1.85 m)
- Position: Defender

Team information
- Current team: GAIS (Club director)

Senior career*
Years	Team	Apps	(Gls)
- Örebro SK
1996–1997	Dalian Wanda		
1997–2000	Dundee United	55	(1)
2000–2003	GAIS		
- * Club domestic league appearances and goals

Bo Magnus Sköldmark (born September 22, 1968 in Långsele) is a Swedish former footballer who is currently club director for Swedish side GAIS. Sköldmark played for Örebro SK in his native Sweden before spells with Chinese side Dalian Wanda and Scottish side Dundee United. During his spell at Dundee United he is remembered for scoring in a 2-1 league win over rivals Dundee. He scored one other goal for United in the Scottish Cup against Ayr United to send them into the semi-finals. Following his release in 2000, Sköldmark returned to Sweden in 2000 and finished his career with GAIS before he got the role of club director in Gais. Between 2016 and 2019 Sköldmark was working as club director for his former club Örebro SK Since 2020 he is the club director of GAIS.

== Honours ==
- Scottish League Cup: Runner-up

1997-98

== See also ==
- Dundee United F.C. season 1997-98
- Dundee United F.C. season 1998-99
- Dundee United F.C. season 1999-00
