= Jean-Jacques Missé-Missé =

Cameroonian footballer

Personal information
- Full name: Jean-Jacques Missé-Missé
- Date of birth: 7 August 1968 (age 58)
- Place of birth: Yaoundé, Cameroon
- Height: 1.80 m (5 ft 11 in)
- Position: Striker

Senior career*
Years	Team	Apps	(Gls)
1986–1989	Canon Yaoundé		
1990–1991	Diamant Yaoundé		
1991–1993	Andenne-Seilles		
1993–1996	Charleroi	93	(37)
1996–1997	Sporting CP	4	(0)
1997	Trabzonspor	10	(1)
1998	Dundee United	4	(0)
1998	Chesterfield	1	(0)
1998–1999	Louviéroise	29	(9)
1999–2000	Ethnikos Asteras	30	(9)
2000–2002	Louviéroise	41	(5)
2002–2003	Oostende	27	(18)
2003–2004	Mechelen	23	(9)

International career
1984–1987	Cameroon	10	(4)
Medal record
Men's football
Representing Cameroon
Africa Cup of Nations
Runner-up	1986 Egypt
Afro-Asian Cup of Nations
Winner	1985 Cameroon
- * Club domestic league appearances and goals

Jean-Jacques Missé-Missé (born 7 August 1968) is a Cameroonian former footballer who played as a striker.

During his professional career – and not counting his native years – which spanned 13 years, he played in six countries, notably in Belgium.

== Football career ==
Missé-Missé was born in Yaoundé. After playing in his country for hometown's Canon Sportif and Diamant, he moved to Belgium at the age of 23, first representing amateurs US Andenne-Seilles.

In 1993 Missé-Missé switched to the country's top flight, with R. Charleroi SC. In his first season, he scored a career-best 15 goals as the Zebras finished a best-ever fourth; during his three-year spell, he netted nearly 50 official goals.

Missé-Missé joined Sporting Clube de Portugal in 1996, but failed to adjust at the Lisbon side. In the following years his career faded into obscurity, as he hardly received any playing time: during the 1997–98 season he played for three clubs, including Chesterfield in England and Dundee United in Scotland (five games combined).

After a good season with Ethnikos Asteras in Greece – the club was then in the top division– Missé-Missé returned to Belgium, playing for R.A.A. Louviéroise, K.V. Oostende and KV Mechelen (nine second level goals for the latter), closing out his career at nearly 36.

== Honours ==
Cameroon

- African Cup of Nations: runner-up, 1986
- Afro-Asian Cup of Nations: 1985

== See also ==
- 1997–98 Dundee United F.C. season
