= Thomas Tengstedt =

Danish footballer (born 1975)

Personal information
- Date of birth: 15 May 1975 (age 51)
- Place of birth: Aalborg, Denmark
- Height: 1.87 m (6 ft 2 in)
- Position: Left-back

Senior career*
Years	Team	Apps	(Gls)
1995–1997	Aalborg Chang		
1997–1998	Dundee United	0	(0)
1998–2009	Viborg	190	(4)
- * Club domestic league appearances and goals

Thomas Tengstedt (born 15 May 1975) is a Danish former professional footballer who most prominently played as a left-back for Viborg FF.

== Career ==
Born in Aalborg, Tengstedt started his career with amateur club Aalborg Chang. He moved abroad to play the 1997-98 season with Scottish Premier Division club Dundee United, but made no first team appearances. He moved back to Denmark in 1998 to play for Viborg FF in the Danish Superliga, with whom he won the 2000 Danish Cup tournament. He played 190 games and scored four goals for Viborg FF in the Superliga, over the span of ten seasons, before the club was relegated to the Danish 1st Division in the summer 2008. In May 2009, Tengstedt ended his career due to injury, having played a total 233 games and scored 12 goals for Viborg FF.

== Personal life ==
His son Casper Tengstedt is also a footballer.

== Honours ==
Viborg FF

- Danish Super Cup
  - 2000
