= 1997–98 Scottish League Cup =

Tournament details
- Country: Scotland

Final positions
- Champions: Celtic
- Runners-up: Dundee United

Tournament statistics
- Top goal scorer: Gary McSwegan (5)

The 1997–98 Scottish League Cup was the 52nd staging of Scotland's second most prestigious football knockout competition. The competition was won by Celtic, who defeated Dundee United 3–0 in the Final. The Final was played at Ibrox Stadium because Hampden Park was being redeveloped, work which was completed in time for the 1999 Scottish Cup Final.

== First round ==
Home team	Score	Away team
Arbroath	0–4	Queen of the South
Berwick Rangers	2–0	Brechin City
Cowdenbeath	0–2	Alloa Athletic
Dumbarton	(p)1 – 1	Queen's Park
East Stirlingshire	3–1	Stranraer
Forfar Athletic	1–0	Albion Rovers
Inverness Caledonian Thistle	5–1	Stenhousemuir
Ross County	2–1	Montrose

== Second round ==
Home team	Score	Away team
Berwick Rangers	0–7	Celtic
Dumbarton	1–5	Aberdeen
Dundee	1–0	East Stirlingshire
Dunfermline Athletic	5-1	Ayr United
East Fife	0–2	Kilmarnock
Hibernian	3–1	Alloa Athletic
Livingston	0–2	Heart of Midlothian
Morton	4–1	Airdrieonians
Motherwell	(p)2 – 2	Inverness Caledonian Thistle
Partick Thistle	2–3	Stirling Albion
Queen of the South	2–4	Dundee United
Raith Rovers	5–0	Forfar Athletic
Ross County	0–3	Falkirk
St Johnstone	3–0	Clyde
St Mirren	2–0	Clydebank
Hamilton Academical	0–1	Rangers

== Third round ==
Home team	Score	Away team
Dundee United	2–1	Hibernian
Dunfermline Athletic	2–0	St Mirren
Motherwell	3–0	Morton
Stirling Albion	6–2	Kilmarnock
Dundee	0–3	Aberdeen
Raith Rovers	1–2	Heart of Midlothian
Rangers	4–1	Falkirk
St Johnstone	0–1	Celtic

== Quarter-finals ==
Home team	Score	Away team
Celtic	1–0	Motherwell
Stirling Albion	0–2	Aberdeen
Dunfermline Athletic	1–0(AET)	Heart of Midlothian
Rangers	0–1	Dundee United

== Semi-finals ==
14 October 1997

Dunfermline Athletic	0–1	Celtic
	Report	Burley 70'

Ibrox Stadium, Glasgow
Attendance: 27,796

15 October 1997

Aberdeen	1–3	Dundee United
Windass 49'	Report	Winters 35'; Easton 53'; Winters 75'

Tynecastle Stadium, Edinburgh
Attendance: 10,459

== Final ==
30 November 1997

Celtic	3–0	Dundee United
Rieper 21'; Larsson 24'; Burley 59'

Ibrox Stadium, Glasgow
Attendance: 49,305
