= Sigurður Jónsson =

Sigurður Jónsson may refer to:

- Sigurður Jónsson (alpine skier) (1959-1996), Icelandic skier
- Sigurður Jónsson (footballer) (born 1966), Icelandic footballer and coach
- Sigurður Jónsson (swimmer) (1922–2019), Icelandic swimmer
- Sigurður Páll Jónsson (born 1958), Icelandic politician
- Sigurður Th. Jónsson (1924–2003), Icelandic swimmer
- Sigurður Örn Jónsson (born 1973), Icelandic footballer

== See also ==
- Sigurd Jonsson, Norwegian nobleman
