= Mikael Andersson (footballer, born 1972) =

Swedish footballer

Personal information
- Full name: Mikael Andersson
- Date of birth: 3 February 1972 (age 54)
- Place of birth: Örebro, Sweden
- Height: 5 ft 11 in (1.80 m)
- Position: Midfielder

Senior career*
Years	Team	Apps	(Gls)
1989–2003	Örebro	274	(32)
1997	→ Dundee United (loan)	3	(0)
- * Club domestic league appearances and goals as of 20:13, 8 December 2011 (UTC)

Mikael Andersson (born February 3, 1972, in Örebro) is a Swedish footballer who plays as a midfielder. Andersson was playing for Örebro before joining Dundee United on loan for one month in November 1997. After making three appearances, Andersson returned to Sweden. After the season 2003 he ended his football career.

== See also ==
- Dundee United F.C. season 1997-98
