= John Gardiner (footballer, born 1958) =

Scottish footballer (born 1958)

Personal information
- Full name: John Gardiner
- Date of birth: 2 April 1958 (age 68)
- Place of birth: Glasgow, Scotland
- Height: 1.85 m (6 ft 1 in)
- Position: Goalkeeper

Senior career*
Years	Team	Apps	(Gls)
1978–1979	Aberdeen	2	(0)
1983–1984	Dundee United	2	(0)
1980–1981	→ Airdrieonians (on loan)	10	(0)
1981–1982	→ Forfar Athletic (loan)	5	(0)
1984–1987	Motherwell	78	(0)
1987–1988	Montrose	1	(0)
- Peterhead
- Huntly

Managerial career
- 1998–1999: Huntly
- –2006: Inverurie Loco Works
- 2007–: Formartine United
- * Club domestic league appearances and goals

John Gardiner (born 2 April 1958) is a Scottish former footballer who played most of his career with Motherwell. He historically managed Formartine United. Gardiner's son Ross, like his father, also played for Dundee United.
