= David Hannah =

Scottish footballer and coach

Personal information
- Date of birth: 4 August 1973 (age 53)
- Place of birth: Coatbridge, Scotland
- Height: 1.82 m (5 ft 11 1/2 in)
- Position: Defensive midfielder

Senior career*
Years	Team	Apps	(Gls)
1990–1996	Dundee United	93	(12)
1996–1999	Celtic	41	(0)
1999–2002	Dundee United	124	(13)
2002–2003	AEL Limassol	8	(1)
2003–2004	Ross County	38	(3)
2004–2006	St Johnstone	42	(4)
2006	Bury	2	(0)
2006	Brechin City	7	(1)
2006–2007	Grindavik	14	(0)
2007	Cowdenbeath (loan)	22	(0)
2007–2008	Fylkir	32	(1)
2008	→ Cowdenbeath (loan)	3	(0)
2008	Montrose	4	(0)
Total		502	(36)

International career
1993–1995	Scotland U21	17	(3)

Managerial career
- 2008: Montrose (Caretaker)
- 2011–2012: Einherji
- 2018–: PS Kemi
- 2023: Penicuik Athletic
- * Club domestic league appearances and goals as of 11:04, 22 February 2009 (UTC)

David Hannah (born 4 August 1973) is a Scottish footballer and coach who played in central midfield. He began his career with Dundee United, transferred to Celtic in 1996 and rejoined Dundee United from 1999 to 2002. He then had short spells with a number of Scottish clubs, including Ross County and St Johnstone, as well as playing for clubs in Cyprus, England and Iceland. He also represented the Scotland under-21 team. During his career, Hannah won all three major honours in Scottish football – the Scottish Cup with Dundee United and the Premier Division title and League Cup with Celtic.

As a coach, Hannah was with Montrose – including a spell as caretaker manager in 2008 – and went on to manage Einherji in Iceland from 2011 to 2012.

== Career ==
=== Club ===
Hannah was born in Coatbridge, and began his career with Dundee United, making his league début in February 1993 and winning a Scottish Cup winners' medal in 1994. In December 1996, after scoring in his final match, Hannah moved to Celtic in a £650,000 deal. Hannah went on to make over sixty appearances for the Bhoys, picking up a League winners' medal and a League Cup medal during the 1997–98 season, and completing a clean sweep of domestic honours. He scored once during his spell at Celtic in a UEFA Cup qualifying tie with Inter Cable Tel in July 1997.

In February 1999, Hannah returned to Tannadice in a £550,000 deal, just over two years since his departure. Scoring in his second match after returning, Hannah went on to make over 200 league appearances during his second spell before leaving in March 2002, just over three years later. Hannah moved to Cypriot side AEL Limassol before returning to Scotland in 2003 with Ross County and being reunited with former United manager Alex Smith. At Ross County he scored once against Inverness Caledonian Thistle. In 2004, Hannah moved to St Johnstone where he spent two seasons before a succession of short-term moves within Britain and Iceland. During his brief spell at Brechin City he scored once against former club Ross County.

In October 2007, following the end of the Icelandic season, Hannah returned to Cowdenbeath on loan for the second time in a year. Following the conclusion of the Icelandic season, Hannah joined Montrose in October 2008 as temporary caretaker player/manager to fill the gap created by the departures of Jim Weir and Kevin McGowne. In December 2008, he left Montrose after eight games in charge, Hannah then joined Highland League side Nairn County in August 2010.

=== Managerial ===
On 30 June 2018, Hannah was appointed as PS Kemi's new head coach, whilst continuing his role as their sporting director.

Hannah then took on a role as Technical Director at Halifax Dunbrack Soccer Club based in Halifax. Nova Scotia.

He was appointed manager of Penicuik Athletic in May 2023. He left the role in July 2023.

== Honours ==
Dundee United

- Scottish Cup (1): 1993–94
- SFL Reserve League (2): 1991–92, 1992–93
- Scottish Youth Cup (2): 1989–90, 1990–91

Celtic:

- Scottish Premier Division (1): 1997–98
- Scottish League Cup (1): 1997–98
