= Andy McLaren =

Scottish footballer

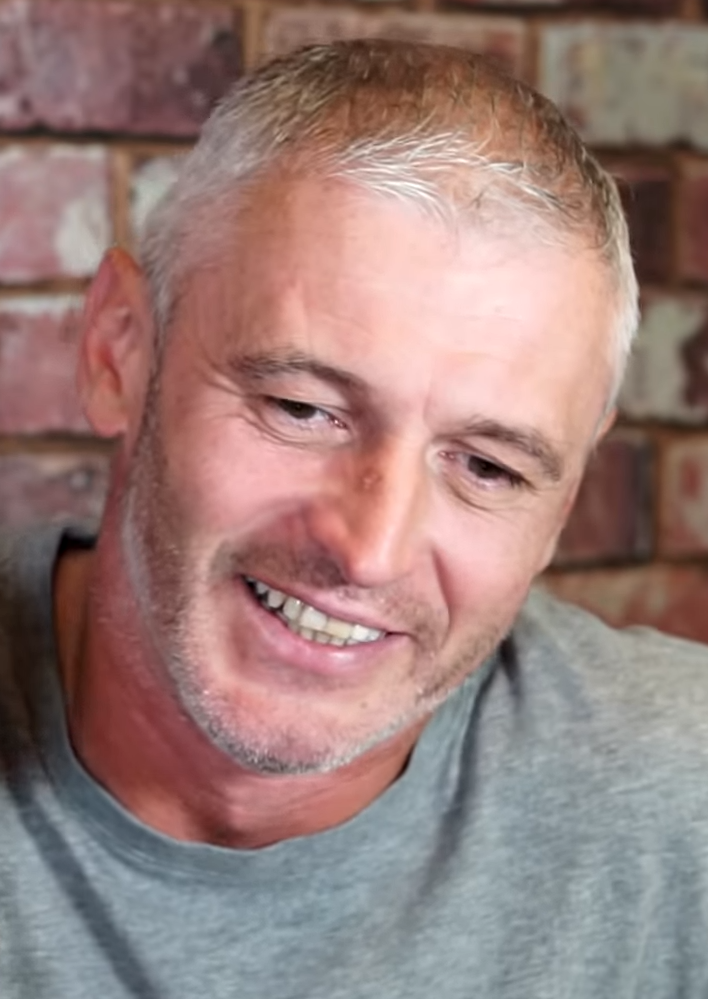
- McLaren in 2018

Personal information
- Full name: Andrew McLaren
- Date of birth: 5 June 1973 (age 53)
- Place of birth: Glasgow, Scotland
- Position: Winger

Senior career*
Years	Team	Apps	(Gls)
1989–1999	Dundee United	164	(11)
1999–2000	Reading	9	(1)
1999	→ Livingston (loan)	9	(0)
2000–2003	Kilmarnock	83	(13)
2003–2005	Dundee United	33	(4)
2004–2005	→ Partick Thistle (loan)	9	(0)
2005	→ Greenock Morton (loan)	12	(3)
2005–2006	Greenock Morton	34	(7)
2006	Dundee	12	(3)
2007–2008	Ayr United	18	(3)
2008	Lesmahagow		
2009	Pollok	1	(0)
2009	Petershill		

International career
1993	Scotland U21	3	(0)
2001	Scotland	1	(0)
- * Club domestic league appearances and goals

Andy McLaren (born 5 June 1973) is a Scottish former professional footballer.

He began his career in 1989 with Dundee United where he was for 10 years and was part of the team when they won the Scottish Cup in 1994. He left for Reading in 1999 and had a spell on loan with Livingston, but had trouble with cannabis and cocaine and spent time in rehab before returning to football in June 2000, signing for Kilmarnock. He returned to Dundee United in 2003 and later played for Partick Thistle, Greenock Morton, Dundee and Ayr United.

== Career ==
McLaren, a winger, began his career in 1989 with Dundee United, and made his first team debut at the beginning of the 1991–92 season, where he remained for 10 years, helping them win the Scottish Cup in 1994. He left Tannadice for English club Reading in 1999 and during his spell had a brief loan spell at Livingston. On returning to Reading in February 2000, he tested positive for cannabis and cocaine and admitted to alcoholism, and was released by the club.

After spending time in rehabilitation, he returned to football in June 2000 when he was signed for Kilmarnock by the then manager Bobby Williamson. During his time at Rugby Park, he won his only Scotland cap, a substitute appearance in a 1–1 draw against Poland in April 2001.

He left Kilmarnock in summer 2003 after rejecting a new contract and, after spells training with Hibernian and Falkirk, appearing in the league with the latter, he returned to Dundee United on a four-month deal in August 2003. He played for one season at Dundee United team, before being loaned to Partick Thistle in November 2004, and later to Greenock Morton in February 2005. He left Dundee United by mutual consent in July 2005, and joined Morton on a permanent deal.

After a season at Cappielow, he joined Dundee in July 2006. In his side's defeat at Clyde on 16 December 2006, McLaren was sent off for aiming a blow at a Clyde player, before getting a second red after striking another opponent on the way off the pitch. Once into the dressing rooms he received his third red card for kicking a hole in the door of the referee's room. As a consequence of his actions, Dundee decided to release him from his contract on 20 December 2006.

In February 2007, McLaren signed for Ayr United on a part-time deal until the end of 2006–07, scoring on his début a month later. McLaren was released from Somerset Park in May 2008, and in August 2008 spent a few games on trial at Bathgate Thistle, before a short spell at Lesmahagow and a short trial at Pollok, whom he left on the back of yet another red card. McLaren joined Petershill in 2009.

On 12 May 2016, McLaren signed for Tynecastle F.C. as a player-coach.

== Personal life ==
McLaren was raised in Castlemilk neighborhood of Glasgow.

McLaren gave a positive drugs test in 2000 during his time at Reading and was immediately banned from football. After receiving treatment for drug addiction and alcoholism, McLaren returned to football with Kilmarnock, continuing to receive treatment upon returning to first club Dundee United in 2004. Upon signing for Morton permanently in 2005, McLaren admitted to then manager Jim McInally he had suffered from abuse as a child, which had led to his drug and alcohol problems. He later announced he had considered suicide, including crashing into a lorry at 80 mph.

McLaren's life is detailed in his autobiography, Tormented, where he chronicles his abuse as a child. As highlighted in his autobiography, Andy wanted to help young people avoid the pitfalls that have affected his life and career, he delivered presentations and talks to young people on his life both in and out of football.

== Career statistics ==
Appearances and goals by club, season and competition
Club	Season	League			National cup (Note: Includes Scottish Cup, FA Cup)		League cup (Note: Includes Scottish League Cup, Football League Cup)		Europe		Total	
Club	Season	Division	Apps	Goals	Apps	Goals	Apps	Goals	Apps	Goals	Apps	Goals
Dundee United	1991–92	Scottish Premier Division	13	0	—		3	0	—		16	0
Dundee United	1992–93	Scottish Premier Division	5	0	1	0	—		—		6	0
Dundee United	1993–94	Scottish Premier Division	27	2	4	1	4	1	1	0	36	4
Dundee United	1994–95	Scottish Premier Division	19	0	—		1	0	2	0	22	0
Dundee United	1995–96	Scottish First Division	34	3	—		2	0	—		36	3
Dundee United	1996–97	Scottish Premier Division	34	3	6	2	1	0	—		41	5
Dundee United	1997–98	Scottish Premier Division	27	4	3	0	4	0	4	2	38	6
Dundee United	1998–99	Scottish Premier League	8	0	3	0	1	0	—		12	0
Dundee United	Total		167	12	17	3	16	1	7	2	207	18
Reading	1998–99	Football League Second Division	7	1	—		—		—		7	1
Reading	1999–00	Football League Second Division	2	0	—		2	0	—		4	0
Reading	Total		9	1	0	0	2	0	0	0	11	1
Livingston (loan)	1999–00	Scottish First Division	9	0	—		—		—		9	0
Kilmarnock	2000–01	Scottish Premier League	32	6	3	0	5	2	—		40	8
Kilmarnock	2001–02	Scottish Premier League	26	2	1	0	1	2	3	0	31	2
Kilmarnock	2002–03	Scottish Premier League	25	5	1	0	—		—		26	5
Kilmarnock	Total		83	13	5	0	6	4	3	0	97	15
Dundee United	2003–04	Scottish Premier League	30	4	1	0	2	1	—		33	5
Dundee United	2004–05	Scottish Premier League	6	0	—		2	0	—		8	0
Dundee United	Total		36	4	1	0	4	1	0	0	41	5
Partick Thistle (loan)	2004–05	Scottish First Division	9	0	—		—		—		9	)
Greenock Morton (loan)	2004–05	Scottish Second Division	12	3	—		—		—		12	3
Greenock Morton	2005–06	Scottish Second Division	34	7	2	0	1	0	—		37	7
Dundee	2006–07	Scottish First Division	12	3	—		—		—		12	3
Ayr United	2006–07	Scottish Second Division	9	2	—		—		—		9	2
Ayr United	2007–08	Scottish Second Division	8	1	—		1	0	—		9	1
Ayr United	Total		17	3	0	0	1	0	0	0	18	3
Career total			378	46	25	3	30	6	10	2	443	57

== Personal awards and achievements ==
- Scottish Premier League Player of the Month: August 2000
