= 1997–98 in Scottish football =

Sportseason of a football competition

Premier League champions
- Celtic

Division One champions
- Dundee

Division Two champions
- Stranraer

Division Three champions
- Alloa Athletic

Scottish Cup winners
- Heart of Midlothian

League Cup winners
- Celtic

Challenge Cup winners
- Falkirk

Junior Cup winners
- Arthurlie

Teams in Europe
- Celtic, Dundee United, Kilmarnock, Rangers

Scotland national team
- 1998 World Cup qualification, 1998 World Cup
- ← 1996–97 1998–99 →

The 1997–98 season was the 101st season of competitive football in Scotland. Celtic won the Premier Division championship, preventing rivals Rangers from winning a record 10th successive championship.

== Scottish Premier Division ==
| Pos | Team | Pld | W | D | L | GF | GA | GD | Pts | Qualification or relegation |
|---|---|---|---|---|---|---|---|---|---|---|
| 1 | Celtic (C) | 36 | 22 | 8 | 6 | 64 | 24 | +40 | 74 | Qualification for the Champions League first qualifying round |
| 2 | Rangers | 36 | 21 | 9 | 6 | 76 | 38 | +38 | 72 | Qualification for the UEFA Cup first qualifying round |
| 3 | Heart of Midlothian | 36 | 19 | 10 | 7 | 70 | 46 | +24 | 67 | Qualification for the Cup Winners' Cup qualifying round |
| 4 | Kilmarnock | 36 | 13 | 11 | 12 | 40 | 52 | −12 | 50 | Qualification for the UEFA Cup first qualifying round |
| 5 | St Johnstone | 36 | 13 | 9 | 14 | 38 | 42 | −4 | 48 | |
| 6 | Aberdeen | 36 | 9 | 12 | 15 | 39 | 53 | −14 | 39 | |
| 7 | Dundee United | 36 | 8 | 13 | 15 | 43 | 51 | −8 | 37 | |
| 8 | Dunfermline Athletic | 36 | 8 | 13 | 15 | 43 | 68 | −25 | 37 | |
| 9 | Motherwell | 36 | 9 | 7 | 20 | 46 | 64 | −18 | 34 | |
| 10 | Hibernian (R) | 36 | 6 | 12 | 18 | 38 | 59 | −21 | 30 | Relegation to the First Division |

Source: Rec.Sport.Soccer Statistics Foundation
Rules for classification: 1) Points; 2) Goal difference; 3) Goals scored
(C) Champions; (R) Relegated

=== Top scorers ===
| Player | Goals | Team |
|---|---|---|
| (Italy) Marco Negri | 32 | Rangers |
| (Sweden) Kjell Olofsson | 18 | Dundee United |
| (Sweden) Henrik Larsson | 16 | Celtic |
| (Scotland) Andy Smith | 16 | Dunfermline Athletic |
| (Republic of Ireland) Tommy Coyne | 14 | Motherwell |
| (Scotland) Jim Hamilton | 14 | Heart of Midlothian |
| (Republic of Ireland) Owen Coyle | 11 | Motherwell |
| (Germany) Jörg Albertz | 10 | Rangers |
| (Scotland) Craig Burley | 10 | Celtic |
| (Scotland) Billy Dodds | 10 | Aberdeen |
| (Scotland) Simon Donnelly | 10 | Celtic |
| (Scotland) Neil McCann | 10 | Heart of Midlothian |
| (Northern Ireland) George O'Boyle | 10 | St Johnstone |
| (Scotland) Paul Wright | 10 | Kilmarnock |

Source: Soccerbot Archived 2008-10-07 at the Wayback Machine

== Scottish League Division One ==
=== Table ===
| Pos | Team | Pld | W | D | L | GF | GA | GD | Pts | Promotion or relegation |
|---|---|---|---|---|---|---|---|---|---|---|
| 1 | Dundee (C, P) | 36 | 20 | 10 | 6 | 52 | 24 | +28 | 70 | Promotion to the Premier League |
| 2 | Falkirk | 36 | 19 | 8 | 9 | 56 | 41 | +15 | 65 | |
| 3 | Raith Rovers | 36 | 17 | 9 | 10 | 51 | 33 | +18 | 60 | |
| 4 | Airdrieonians | 36 | 16 | 12 | 8 | 42 | 35 | +7 | 60 | |
| 5 | Greenock Morton | 36 | 12 | 10 | 14 | 40 | 47 | −7 | 46 | |
| 6 | St Mirren | 36 | 11 | 8 | 17 | 41 | 53 | −12 | 41 | |
| 7 | Ayr United | 36 | 10 | 10 | 16 | 40 | 56 | −16 | 40 | |
| 8 | Hamilton Academical | 36 | 9 | 11 | 16 | 43 | 56 | −13 | 38 | |
| 9 | Partick Thistle (R) | 36 | 8 | 12 | 16 | 45 | 55 | −10 | 36 | Relegation to the Second Division |
| 10 | Stirling Albion (R) | 36 | 8 | 10 | 18 | 40 | 56 | −16 | 34 | Relegation to the Second Division |

Source: RSSSF
Rules for classification: 1) points; 2) goal difference; 3) number of goals scored.
(C) Champions; (P) Promoted; (R) Relegated

=== Top scorers ===
| P | Name | Goals |
|---|---|---|
| 1 | (Scotland) James Grady (Dundee) | 15 |
| 2 | (Scotland) Alex Bone (Stirling Albion) | 13 |
| 3 | (Scotland) Eddie Annand (Dundee) | 12 |
| = | (Scotland) Brian McPhee (Airdrieonians) | 12 |
| = | (England) David Moss (Falkirk) | 12 |
| 6 | (England) Stephen Cooper (Airdrieonians) | 11 |
| 7 | (Benin) Laurent D'Jaffo (Ayr United) | 10 |
| = | (Scotland) Paul Hartley (Raith Rovers) | 10 |
| = | (England) Warren Hawke (Morton) | 10 |
| = | (Scotland) Marino Keith (Falkirk) | 10 |

== Scottish League Division Two ==
=== Table ===
| Pos | Team | Pld | W | D | L | GF | GA | GD | Pts | Promotion or relegation |
|---|---|---|---|---|---|---|---|---|---|---|
| 1 | Stranraer (C, P) | 36 | 18 | 7 | 11 | 62 | 44 | +18 | 61 | Promotion to the First Division |
| 2 | Clydebank (P) | 36 | 16 | 12 | 8 | 48 | 31 | +17 | 60 | Promotion to the First Division |
| 3 | Livingston | 36 | 16 | 11 | 9 | 56 | 40 | +16 | 59 | |
| 4 | Queen of the South | 36 | 15 | 9 | 12 | 57 | 51 | +6 | 54 | |
| 5 | Inverness CT | 36 | 13 | 10 | 13 | 65 | 51 | +14 | 49 | |
| 6 | East Fife | 36 | 14 | 6 | 16 | 51 | 59 | −8 | 48 | |
| 7 | Forfar Athletic | 36 | 12 | 10 | 14 | 51 | 61 | −10 | 46 | |
| 8 | Clyde | 36 | 10 | 12 | 14 | 40 | 53 | −13 | 42 | |
| 9 | Stenhousemuir (R) | 36 | 10 | 10 | 16 | 44 | 53 | −9 | 40 | Relegation to the Third Division |
| 10 | Brechin City (R) | 36 | 7 | 11 | 18 | 42 | 73 | −31 | 32 | Relegation to the Third Division |

Source: "1997-1998 Second Division - SPFL Archive". SPFL (in Malay).
Rules for classification: 1) points; 2) goal difference; 3) number of goals scored.
(C) Champions; (P) Promoted; (R) Relegated

=== Top scorers ===
| P | Name | Goals |
|---|---|---|
| 1 | (Scotland) Iain Stewart (Inverness CT) | 16 |
| 2 | (Scotland) Graham Harvey (Livingston) | 15 |
| = | (Scotland) Ian Little (Stenhousemuir) | 15 |
| 4 | (Scotland) Martin McLauchan (Forfar Athletic) | 14 |
| 5 | (Scotland) Colin McDonald (Clydebank) | 13 |
| = | (Scotland) B Thomson (Inverness CT) | 13 |
| 7 | (Australia) Ben Honeyman (Forfar Athletic) | 12 |
| 8 | (Scotland) Tommy Bryce (Queen of the South) | 11 |
| = | (Scotland) Matthew Dyer (East Fife) | 11 |
| = | (Scotland) Gordon Young (Stranraer) | 11 |

== Scottish League Division Three ==
=== Table ===
| Pos | Team | Pld | W | D | L | GF | GA | GD | Pts | Promotion |
|---|---|---|---|---|---|---|---|---|---|---|
| 1 | Alloa Athletic (C, P) | 36 | 24 | 4 | 8 | 78 | 39 | +39 | 76 | Promotion to the Second Division |
| 2 | Arbroath (P) | 36 | 20 | 8 | 8 | 67 | 39 | +28 | 68 | Promotion to the Second Division |
| 3 | Ross County | 36 | 19 | 10 | 7 | 71 | 36 | +35 | 67 | |
| 4 | East Stirlingshire | 36 | 17 | 6 | 13 | 50 | 48 | +2 | 57 | |
| 5 | Albion Rovers | 36 | 13 | 5 | 18 | 60 | 73 | −13 | 44 | |
| 6 | Berwick Rangers | 36 | 10 | 12 | 14 | 47 | 55 | −8 | 42 | |
| 7 | Queen's Park | 36 | 10 | 11 | 15 | 42 | 55 | −13 | 41 | |
| 8 | Cowdenbeath | 36 | 12 | 2 | 22 | 33 | 57 | −24 | 38 | |
| 9 | Montrose | 36 | 10 | 8 | 18 | 53 | 80 | −27 | 38 | |
| 10 | Dumbarton | 36 | 7 | 10 | 19 | 42 | 61 | −19 | 31 | |

Source: Soccerway
Rules for classification: 1) points; 2) goal difference; 3) number of goals scored.
(C) Champions; (P) Promoted

=== Top scorers ===
| Pos | Player | Club | Goals |
|---|---|---|---|
| 1 | (Scotland) Colin McGlashan | Montrose | 20 |
| 2 | (Scotland) Willie Irvine | Alloa Athletic | 18 |
| 3 | (Scotland) Billy Spence | Arbroath | 16 |
| 4 | (Scotland) Derek Adams | Ross County | 15 |
| 5 | (Scotland) Willie Watters | Albion Rovers | 13 |
| 5 | (Scotland) Davie Watt | East Stirlingshire | 13 |
| 7 | (Scotland) Paul Forrester | Berwick Rangers | 10 |
| 7 | (Scotland) Lee Gardner | Albion Rovers | 10 |
| 7 | (Scotland) Brian Grant | Arbroath | 10 |
| 7 | (Scotland) Colin McKinnon | Dumbarton | 10 |

== Other honours ==
=== Cup honours ===
| Competition | Winner | Score | Runner-up | Report |
|---|---|---|---|---|
| Scottish Cup 1997–98 | Heart of Midlothian | 2 – 1 | Rangers | Wikipedia article |
| League Cup 1997–98 | Celtic | 3 – 0 | Dundee United | Wikipedia article |
| Challenge Cup 1997–98 | Falkirk | 1 – 0 | Queen of the South | Wikipedia article |
| Youth Cup | Heart of Midlothian | 2 – 0 | Dundee United | |
| Junior Cup | Arthurlie | 4 – 0 | Pollok | |

=== Individual honours ===
==== SPFA awards ====
| Award | Winner | Club |
|---|---|---|
| Players' Player of the Year | (Scotland) Jackie McNamara | Celtic |
| Young Player of the Year | (Scotland) Gary Naysmith | Heart of Midlothian |

==== SFWA awards ====
| Award | Winner | Club |
|---|---|---|
| Footballer of the Year | (Scotland) Craig Burley | Celtic |
| Young Player of the Year | (Sweden) Henrik Larsson | Celtic |
| Manager of the Year | (Netherlands) Wim Jansen | Celtic |

== Scottish clubs in Europe ==
| Club | Competition(s) | Final round | Coef. |
|---|---|---|---|
| Rangers | UEFA Champions League; UEFA Europa League | Second qualifying round First round | 2.50 |
| Kilmarnock | UEFA Cup Winners' Cup | First round | 2.50 |
| Celtic | UEFA Europa League | First round | 5.00 |
| Dundee United | UEFA Europa League | Second qualifying round | 2.50 |

Average coefficient – 3.125

== Scotland national team ==
| Date | Venue | Opponents | Score | Competition | Scotland scorer(s) |
|---|---|---|---|---|---|
| 7 September | Pittodrie, Aberdeen (H) | Belarus | 4–1 | WCQG4 | Kevin Gallacher (2), David Hopkin (2) |
| 11 October | Celtic Park, Glasgow (H) | Latvia | 2–0 | WCQG4 | Kevin Gallacher, Gordon Durie |
| 12 November | Stade Geoffroy-Guichard, St Etienne (A) | France | 1–2 | Friendly | Gordon Durie |
| 25 March | Ibrox Stadium, Glasgow (H) | Denmark | 0–1 | Friendly | |
| 22 April | Easter Road, Edinburgh (H) | Finland | 1–1 | Friendly | Darren Jackson |
| 23 May | Giants Stadium, East Rutherford NJ (A) | Colombia | 2–2 | Friendly | John Collins, Craig Burley |
| 30 May | RFK Memorial Stadium, Washington DC (A) | (United States) USA | 0–0 | Friendly | |
| 10 June | Stade de France, Saint-Denis (N) | Brazil | 1–2 | WCGA | John Collins (pen.) |
| 16 June | Stade Lescure, Bordeaux (N) | Norway | 1–1 | WCGA | Craig Burley |
| 23 June | Stade Geoffroy-Guichard, St Etienne (N) | Morocco | 0–3 | WCGA | |

Key:

- (H) = Home match
- (A) = Away match
- WCQG4 = World Cup qualifying – Group 4
- WCGA = World Cup – Group A

== Notable events ==
- After the end of the season, the 10 Premier Division clubs formed a breakaway Scottish Premier League similar to the one formed in England six years earlier.
- Celtic won the Premier Division title after nine successive title wins by Rangers.
- Walter Smith resigned as manager of Rangers after seven years to be succeeded by Dutchman Dick Advocaat.
- Rangers lost the Scottish Cup final 2–1 to Hearts, leaving them without a major trophy for the first time since 1986.
- Paul Gascoigne left Rangers in March to return to England in a £3.4million move to Middlesbrough.
- Ally McCoist left Rangers after 15 years and more than 300 goals to sign for Kilmarnock on a free transfer.
- Goalkeeper Andy Goram left Rangers after seven years, having just walked out of the Scotland squad for the World Cup in France.
- Also leaving Rangers after seven years was Stuart McCall, who moved to England and signed for Bradford City.
- After signing from Perugia in a £3.5million deal at the start of the season, Italian striker Marco Negri had a dream start to his career at Rangers – scoring 23 goals in his first 10 league games. However, after playing 27 league games and scoring 32 goals, his season was ended by a serious eye injury off the field in March.
- Brian Laudrup ended his four-year spell with Rangers and signed for Chelsea at the end of the season.
