= Craig Easton (footballer) =

Scottish footballer (born 1979)

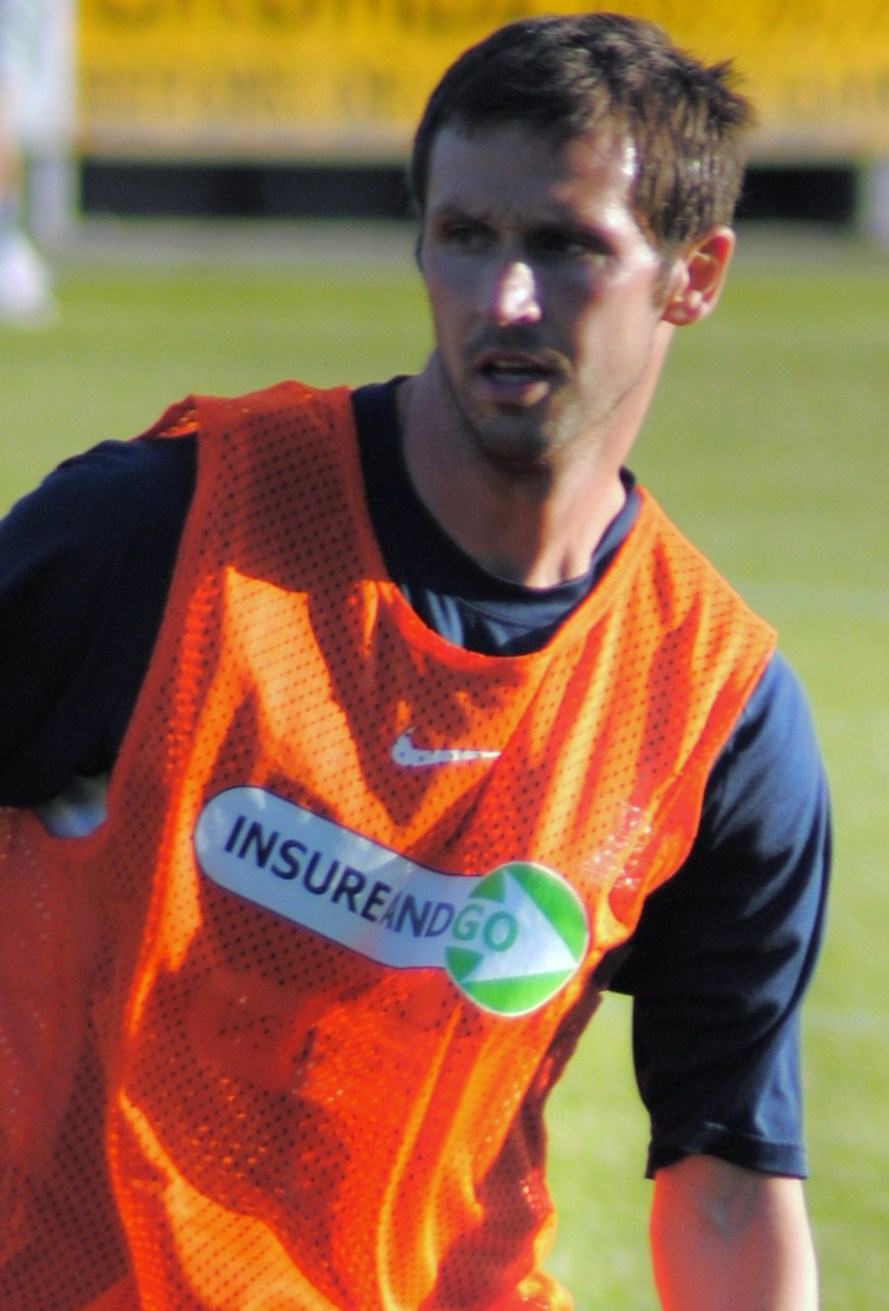
- Easton with Southend United in 2010

Personal information
- Full name: Craig Easton
- Date of birth: 26 February 1979 (age 47)
- Place of birth: Bellshill, Scotland
- Position: Central midfielder

Youth career
- 1995–1996: Dundee United

Senior career*
Years	Team	Apps	(Gls)
1996–2004	Dundee United	221	(12)
2004–2005	Livingston	30	(3)
2005–2007	Leyton Orient	71	(5)
2007–2010	Swindon Town	75	(8)
2010–2011	Southend United	31	(4)
2011–2012	Dunfermline Athletic	3	(0)
2012–2013	Torquay United	21	(0)
2016–2018	Raith Rovers	0	(0)
2020–2021	Cowdenbeath	0	(0)

International career^{‡}
1998–2001	Scotland U21	22	(2)
- * Club domestic league appearances and goals as of 23:01, 31 August 2016 (UTC) ‡ National team caps and goals as of 26 March 2010

Craig Easton (born 26 February 1979) is a Scottish football former player and coach. He began his playing career with Dundee United in 1996 and went on to play over 200 first team matches, before leaving the club in 2004. He subsequently played for Livingston, Leyton Orient, Swindon Town, Southend United, Dunfermline Athletic and Torquay United before retiring as a player in 2013. After becoming a coach at Raith Rovers in July 2016, Easton decided to re-register as a player. Easton also represented the Scotland under-21 team between 1998 and 2001, making 22 appearances.

== Career ==
=== Dundee United ===
Easton began his career with Dundee United, signing full-time terms at the start of the 1996–97 season and making two league appearances in his first season. In 1997–98, Easton was more of a first team regular, featuring in thirty-five matches, with notable firsts including playing in a UEFA Cup match and scoring his first goal in the League Cup semi-final win over Aberdeen. The following season, Easton continued to play in the majority of matches and repeated this trend over the next few seasons.

In 2003–04, Easton played fewer games, with manager Ian McCall – in his first full season as United manager – demoting his squad number from 7 to 18. In April 2004, McCall announced Easton's contract would be allowed to expire at the season's end, although Easton had made the same decision a few months earlier.

=== Livingston ===
Livingston was to be Easton's new club with the midfielder joining the West Lothian club on a one-year deal in July, scoring on his début a month later. Although Easton played regularly during his season at Almondvale, his contract was not renewed. He scored the goal which secured SPL football for Livingston and sent Dundee F.C down to division one.

=== Leyton Orient ===
Despite interest from Motherwell, moved to English side Leyton Orient on a two-year deal in July 2005. Six months after joining Orient, Easton scored the opening goal in the shock 2–1 FA Cup win over Premier League side Fulham when his "deflected shot looped high into the top corner". Three days afterwards, Easton reflected on his short time in England, saying the "new challenge" had "worked out". Easton went on to score on the final day of the season as Orient won promotion to League One. Easton played the majority of games for Orient during the following season.

I would put that down as my greatest achievement and also my most enjoyable moment in football so far.

— Easton after helping Leyton Orient beat Fulham in the FA Cup, BBC Sport website

=== Swindon Town ===
Easton refused a new contract with Orient to sign for Swindon Town in June 2007 on a two-year deal, reuniting him with manager Paul Sturrock who previously managed Easton whilst at Dundee United. Subsequent to Sturrock's departure in late 2007, Easton was reunited with another former Dundee United colleague when Maurice Malpas was appointed as Swindon manager. Easton was a regular fixture in Town's side throughout the season, making 40 league appearances and was named runner-up in the Player of the Year awards.

The following season was less of a success and Easton found himself in and out of the side being utilised in a number of different positions. With his two-year deal set to expire at the end of the season Easton was one of only four players offered a contract extension. In June 2009 he signed a one-year contract extension at the club. At the end of the 2009–10 season, Easton rejected the offer of a new contract and left the club.

=== Southend United ===
On 16 July 2010, Easton signed a pre-contract agreement with Southend United and was named club captain. When the clubs transfer embargo was lifted on the eve of the new season Easton's registration was submitted to the FA and he was eligible to make his debut against Stockport County on 7 August 2010.

Easton scored his first goal for the club against Wolverhampton Wanderers in the League Cup on 24 August 2010. His first league goal came against Chesterfield on 8 January 2011. Easton failed to agree a new deal with Southend and became a free agent when his contract expired on 30 June 2011.

=== Dunfermline Athletic ===
Easton joined Dunfermline Athletic on 26 August 2011, on an initial six-month contract. After three league appearances, Easton's contract ended at the end of January and he became a free agent.

=== Torquay United ===
On 26 June 2012, Easton signed for Torquay United on a free transfer, having completed a two-week trial with the club. Manager Martin Ling claimed Easton was a perfect addition to his squad. The pair had previously worked together at Leyton Orient. In May 2013, Torquay confirmed that Easton was one of seven players who had been released by new manager Alan Knill.

== Coaching career ==
=== Raith Rovers ===
In July 2016, Easton was appointed head coach of the Raith Rovers development team. Easton was also registered as a player at the club, to fill in where needed in development matches. Easton guided Raith Rovers U20s to consecutive SPFL Development League East titles in 2016–17 and 2017–18.

=== Dundee United ===
On 1 June 2018, it was announced that Easton had returned to Dundee United to take the new position of Reserve Team Manager. He said that while the decision to leave Raith Rovers was difficult, "the opportunity to come back to the place where it all began for me and to take on a new challenge at an exciting time for everyone involved, was one I couldn't turn down."

=== Cowdenbeath ===
Easton was appointed assistant manager at Cowdenbeath in August 2019. In October 2020, he registered as a player.

He left the club in October 2021 when manager Gary Bollan left the club by mutual consent.

Montserrat National Team

Easton was an Assistant Coach for Montserrat's National Team in their CONCACAF Nations League games against Haiti and Guyana in March 2023.

== Personal life ==
He graduated from Staffordshire University with a First class degree in Professional Sports Writing and Broadcasting.

== Career statistics ==
Appearances and goals by club, season and competition
Club	Season	League			National cup (Note: Includes Scottish Cup, FA Cup)		League cup (Note: Includes Scottish League Cup, Football League Cup)		Continental		Total	
Club	Season	Division	Apps	Goals	Apps	Goals	Apps	Goals	Apps	Goals	Apps	Goals
Dundee United	1996–97	Scottish Premier Division	2	0	–		–		–		2	0
Dundee United	1997–98	Scottish Premier Division	29	1	1	0	4	1	1	0	35	2
Dundee United	1998–99	Scottish Premier League	30	1	6	0	–		–		36	1
Dundee United	1999–00	Scottish Premier League	31	1	3	0	3	1	–		37	2
Dundee United	2000–01	Scottish Premier League	34	5	4	1	1	0	–		39	6
Dundee United	2001–02	Scottish Premier League	36	3	4	1	3	1	–		43	5
Dundee United	2002–03	Scottish Premier League	36	1	1	0	4	0	–		41	1
Dundee United	2003–04	Scottish Premier League	23	0	1	0	1	0	–		25	0
Dundee United	Total		221	12	20	2	16	3	1	0	258	17
Livingston	2004–05	Scottish Premier League	30	3	2	1	3	1	–		35	5
Leyton Orient	2005–06	Football League Two	41	4	3	1	1	0	–		45	5
Leyton Orient	2006–07	Football League One	30	1	3	0	1	0	–		34	1
Leyton Orient	Total		71	5	6	1	2	0	0	0	79	6
Swindon Town	2007–08	Football League One	40	6	3	0	1	0	–		44	6
Swindon Town	2008–09	Football League One	23	2	0	0	1	0	–		24	2
Swindon Town	Total		63	8	3	0	2	0	0	0	68	8
Career total			385	28	31	4	23	4	1	0	440	36
