= Lars Zetterlund =

Swedish footballer and coach

Personal information
- Full name: Lars Åke Zetterlund
- Date of birth: 11 February 1964 (age 62)
- Place of birth: Härnösand, Sweden
- Height: 1.88 m (6 ft 2 in)
- Position: Midfielder

Team information
- Current team: Örebro SK (coach)

Senior career*
Years	Team	Apps	(Gls)
1979–1980	IF Älgarna	0	(0)
1980–1986	AIK	91	(12)
1986–1989	IFK Göteborg	62	(7)
1989–1996	Örebro SK	137	(10)
1996–1999	Dundee United F.C.	79	(4)
1999–2001	Örebro SK	58	(4)
2003–2004	IF Heimer	0	(0)
Total		418	(38)

International career
1983–1987	Sweden U21	25	(0)

Managerial career
- 2003–2005: IF Heimer
- 2006: IFK Eskilstuna
- * Club domestic league appearances and goals

Lars Åke Zetterlund (born 11 February 1964 in Härnösand) is a Swedish former footballer. He is currently a development coach at Örebro SK.

== Playing career ==
Zetterlund started his career in 1979 at IF Älgarna staying one year.

He made his way to AIK Fotboll where he won the Swedish Cup in 1985.

In 1986, he moved to IFK Göteborg where he won the 1987 Swedish championship and the UEFA Cup in 1987. The UEFA medal was won in a thrilling game 2-1 on aggregate against Scottish club Dundee United. The winning and losing teams were cheered by the United fans at the end of the second leg at Tannadice Park.

He signed for Örebro SK in 1989 because of the guaranteed first-team football. He spent seven years at the Behrn Arena playing almost 150 matches.

In 1996 he moved to Dundee United where he joined up with fellow Swede Kjell Olofsson. He played 79 games for United, scoring four goals, including one in the New Firm derby.

He returned to Sweden and to Örebro in 1999 and retired in 2001. He did come out of retirement in 2003 as player-manager of IF Heimer.

== Coaching career ==
Zetterlund took over the reins of IF Heimer as player-manager in 2003 until 2005. He also had a short spell as manager of IFK Eskilstuna in 2006. In 2007, he became a youth development coach at Örebro SK.

== Honours ==
Sweden:

- Swedish Cup winner: 1984-85
- Swedish football champions: 1987
- UEFA Cup winner: 1986-87

Scotland:

- Scottish League Cup runner-up: 1997-98
