= Erik Pedersen =

Norwegian footballer (born 1967)

Personal information
- Date of birth: 11 October 1967 (age 59)
- Place of birth: Porsgrunn, Norway
- Position: Left-back

Youth career
- Storms
- Eidanger

Senior career*
Years	Team	Apps	(Gls)
1984–1987	Odd		
1988–1990	Tromsø	59	(9)
1991–1993	Viking	61	(7)
1994	Odd	19	(5)
1994–1995	Viking	46	(5)
1996–1999	Dundee United	63	(0)
1999–2001	Odd	36	(0)
2002–2005	Pors		

International career
1990–1992	Norway	10	(0)
- * Club domestic league appearances and goals

Erik Stensrud Pedersen (born 11 October 1967) is a Norwegian former footballer who played as a left-back. Pedersen spent most of his career in Norway, but had a spell in Scotland with Dundee United.

== Playing career ==
Pedersen played youth football for Storms and Eidanger before joining Odds in 1984. He moved to Tromsø in 1988 and then Viking in 1991. He made ten appearances for Norway between 1990 and 1992 and won the 1991 Tippeligaen with Viking, but his career began to be disrupted by injuries. Pedersen rejoined Odds (now known as Odd Grenland) for a year in 1994 before returning to Viking.

On 26 October 1996, Pedersen appeared as a trialist for Dundee United in a Scottish Premier Division match against Hearts, subsequently signing a contract with the club. He quickly became a cult hero with United supporters, playing in all but one of the remaining fixtures of the 1996–97 season and helping the club to a third-placed finish in the league. In November 1997, Pedersen collected a runners-up medal in the Scottish League Cup when he played in Dundee United's 3–0 final defeat against Celtic. After an injury-hit third season in Scotland, during which he made only eight appearances, he left United when his contract expired. Although Pedersen's time in Scotland was relatively short, his popularity was such that he was inducted into the Dundee United Hall of Fame in 2011. His own affection for United is demonstrated by a tattoo of the club badge.

Returning to Norway in 1999, Pedersen joined Odd Grenland for a third time. He won his second major trophy with them in 2000 when Odd defeated Viking 2–1 in the Norwegian Cup final. When he was not offered a new contract by Odd for 2002, he joined Pors Grenland, playing for their first team until 2005.

== Honours ==
=== Club ===
Viking

- Tippeligaen: 1991

Odd Grenland

- Norwegian Football Cup: 2000
