= Mark Perry (Scottish footballer) =

Scottish footballer (born 1971)

Personal information
- Full name: Mark George Perry
- Date of birth: 7 February 1971 (age 55)
- Place of birth: Aberdeen, Scotland
- Position: Defender

Senior career*
Years	Team	Apps	(Gls)
1987–88	Cove Rangers		
1988–98	Dundee United	123	(4)
1998–00	Aberdeen	59	(5)
2000–03	Ross County	76	(1)
2003–07	Peterhead	134	(1)
2007–09	Keith		
2013	Cove Rangers		
- * Club domestic league appearances and goals

Mark George Perry (born 7 February 1971) is a Scottish retired footballer who played professionally as a defender for Dundee United, Aberdeen, Ross County and Peterhead in the Scottish Football League and Scottish Premier League, as well as for Cove Rangers and Keith at Highland League level.

== Playing career ==
Born in Aberdeen, Mark Perry began his senior career with Cove Rangers in the Highland Football League. In August 1988, Scottish Football League Premier Division club Dundee United signed him for a £3000 transfer fee. After spending four seasons playing in the youth and reserve teams and being transfer listed in April 1992, he made his competitive first team debut in a Premier Division match against Aberdeen in December 1992. He played regularly through the rest of the 1992-93 season, but less often over the following two seasons and was again transfer listed in 1994. From 1995 onwards he became more established in the team, helping the club to promotion from the First Division in 1996 after being relegated a year earlier. He also played for Dundee United in the 1997 Scottish League Cup Final defeat against Celtic. Having made over 150 appearances for United, Perry left the club on a free transfer in May 1998 following the expiry of his contract.

Perry then moved to his home-town club Aberdeen, spending the next two seasons there and picking up another League Cup runners-up medal against Celtic, in the 2000 Final. With the club unwilling to offer Perry a new contract, he had a trial with English club Notts County at the beginning of the 2000–01 season, only for it to be cut short due to injury problems at Aberdeen. He joined Ross County later in 2000 and subsequently moved to Third Division club Peterhead in February 2003. He returned to the Highland League with Keith in 2007 and retired in 2009 but later made a playing comeback with his first club, Cove Rangers, in 2013.

== After football ==
After retiring from professional football, Perry worked as a library custodian at the University of Aberdeen.
