= Robbie Winters =

Scottish footballer (born 1974)

Personal information
- Full name: Robert Winters
- Date of birth: 4 November 1974 (age 51)
- Place of birth: East Kilbride, Scotland
- Height: 5 ft 10 in (1.78 m)
- Position: Striker

Youth career
- 1991–1992: Muirend Amateurs

Senior career*
| Years | Team | Apps | (Gls) |
| 1992–1998 | Dundee United | 119 | (26) |
| 1998–2002 | Aberdeen | 132 | (41) |
| 2002 | Luton Town | 1 | (0) |
| 2002–2008 | Brann | 134 | (42) |
| 2009 | Clyde | 6 | (0) |
| 2009 | Ayr United | 1 | (0) |
| 2009–2011 | Livingston | 63 | (18) |
| 2011 | Grindavik | 14 | (3) |
| 2011–2012 | Alloa Athletic | 25 | (5) |
| 2012–2013 | Peterhead | 20 | (3) |
| 2013 | Albion Rovers | 3 | (2) |
| 2013 | Dumbarton | 3 | (0) |
| 2014–2015 | Rossvale | | |
| 2015 | Pollok | 8 | (3) |
| 2015 | East Kilbride | | |
| 2015–2016 | Pollok | 17 | (2) |
| 2016 | East Kilbride | | |
| 2017 | Pollok | 11 | (2) |
| 2017–2018 | Cumbernauld United | | |

International career
| 1999 | Scotland | 1 | (0) |
- * Club domestic league appearances and goals as of 01:34, 24 August 2016 (UTC)

Robert Winters (born 4 November 1974) is a Scottish former footballer who played as a striker. He made one appearance for the Scotland national team in 1999.

Winters started his career in Scotland and played for Dundee United between 1992 and 1997 and Aberdeen between 1998 and 2002. After a short spell at English club Luton Town, Winters played for the Norwegian club Brann between 2002 and 2008 where he won the Norwegian Cup and the Norwegian Premier League.

Winters has later played for Clyde, Ayr United, Livingston, Grindavik, Alloa Athletic, Peterhead and Albion Rovers.

== Early life ==
Winters was born in East Kilbride on 4 November 1974, he played as a youth for Mallard Swifts and started his career with amateur club Muirend. His younger brother David, who would also become a professional footballer, was born in 1983.

== Career ==
=== Club ===
Winters began his senior career with Dundee United in 1992 and played 118 league games for the club, scoring 27 times. A move to Aberdeen beckoned, which saw Billy Dodds and cash come to Tannadice in exchange for Winters. His time at Pittodrie was fruitful, with 41 goals from 132 league appearances. In the 2000 Scottish Cup Final, Winters came on as a 2nd-minute substitute to replace injured goalkeeper Jim Leighton, who suffered a fractured cheekbone. Playing virtually the whole match in an unfamiliar position, Winters let in four goals as Rangers beat Aberdeen 4–0.

After leaving in 2002 when his contract expired, Winters played one match for Luton Town, appearing in the first half of the first match of the season, before moving to Norway with Brann. After several seasons with hints about leaving Bergen due to family issues, Winters stated on 31 October that he no longer had the motivation needed to play for SK Brann, and that he wished to leave the club in January. He was seeking a club, preferably in Scotland, but he also stated that an English Championship club would be interesting. With no contract offer, Winters returned to SK Brann to make peace with manager Mons Ivar Mjelde and fulfil his contract until December 2007. Winters' Scottish teammate Charlie Miller did leave and subsequently joined Belgian side Lierse.

Winters left Brann after the 2008 season, to join his family who had moved back to Scotland during the summer, due to his children starting school. Winters played 178 matches for Brann, scoring 70 goals. He signed a short-term deal with Clyde until the end of the season in April 2009. Winters was released by Clyde in June 2009 along with the rest of the out of contract players, due to the club's financial position.

After an impressive performance as a trialist against Falkirk, Winters signed a professional contract with Livingston on 28 August 2009.

Winters played for Icelandic club Grindavík in 2011. He scored on his debut against Thor. He then played for Alloa Athletic during the 2011–12 season and helped them win the Scottish Third Division championship. In the summer of 2012, Winters signed for Peterhead, before being released in February 2013 and going on a 3-game trial with Albion Rovers. He chose not to sign a contract at the expiration of the trial. He joined Dumbarton in March 2013.

Winters signed for Rossvale in August 2014 and scored two goals on his debut. He then signed for Pollok in April 2015, where he joined his younger brother David. He joined Lowland League team East Kilbride in July 2015, but left the club the following month after "a difference of opinion" with manager Billy Ogilvie. Returning to Junior football, he made one appearance assisting Kilbirnie Ladeside before rejoining Pollok in September 2015.

Winters came off the substitutes bench and scored with his first touch in the 2015–16 Scottish Junior Cup final for Pollok against Beith Juniors. He also scored in the penalty shootout which Pollok eventually lost. In August 2016, Winters rejoined East Kilbride for a second spell, this time in a player-coach role and was reunited with his former Rossvale manager, Martin Lauchlan. However, similarly to his first spell with the side, Winters time with the club was brief and he left in November 2016, due to a combination of work commitments and a lack of playing time.

Winters joined Cumbernauld United in August 2017. He retired from playing in 2018.

=== International ===
Winters made one appearance for Scotland, in a 1–0 friendly win against Germany in Bremen, April 1999.

== Career statistics ==
As of 15 January 2015

| Season | Club | Division | League | | National Cup | | League Cup | | Europe | | Other | | Total | |
| Season | Club | Division | Apps | Goals | Apps | Goals | Apps | Goals | Apps | Goals | Apps | Gpals | Apps | Goals |
|---|---|---|---|---|---|---|---|---|---|---|---|---|---|---|
| 1994–95 | Dundee United | Scottish Premier Division | 12 | 2 | 0 | 0 | — | | — | | — | | 12 | 2 |
| 1995–96 | Dundee United | Scottish First Division | 38 | 7 | 3 | 0 | 2 | 1 | — | | 4 | 2 | 47 | 10 |
| 1996–97 | Dundee United | Scottish Premier Division | 36 | 8 | 6 | 3 | 2 | 1 | — | | — | | 44 | 12 |
| 1997–98 | Dundee United | Scottish Premier Division | 30 | 8 | 3 | 1 | 5 | 2 | 4 | 6 | — | | 42 | 17 |
| 1998–99 | Dundee United | SPL | 3 | 1 | 0 | 0 | 1 | 0 | — | | — | | 4 | 1 |
| Total | | | 119 | 26 | 12 | 4 | 10 | 4 | 4 | 6 | 4 | 2 | 149 | 42 |
| 1998–99 | Aberdeen | Premier League | 28 | 12 | 1 | 0 | — | | — | | — | | 29 | 12 |
| 1999–00 | Aberdeen | Premier League | 33 | 7 | 4 | 0 | 5 | 0 | — | | — | | 42 | 7 |
| 2000–01 | Aberdeen | Premier League | 37 | 9 | 3 | 1 | 1 | 1 | 2 | 1 | — | | 43 | 12 |
| 2001–02 | Aberdeen | Premier League | 34 | 13 | 3 | 1 | 1 | 0 | — | | — | | 38 | 14 |
| Total | | | 132 | 41 | 11 | 2 | 7 | 1 | 2 | 1 | — | | 152 | 45 |
| 2002–03 | Luton Town | Second Division | 1 | 0 | 0 | 0 | — | | — | | — | | 1 | 0 |
| 2002 | Brann | Tippeligaen | 8 | 1 | 0 | 0 | — | | — | | — | | 8 | 1 |
| 2003 | Brann | Tippeligaen | 16 | 7 | 1 | 0 | — | | — | | — | | 17 | 7 |
| 2004 | Brann | Tippeligaen | 23 | 13 | 6 | 12 | — | | — | | — | | 29 | 25 |
| 2005 | Brann | Tippeligaen | 26 | 8 | 4 | 0 | — | | 4 | 1 | — | | 34 | 9 |
| 2006 | Brann | Tippeligaen | 25 | 7 | 3 | 1 | — | | 2 | 0 | — | | 30 | 8 |
| 2007 | Brann | Tippeligaen | 19 | 5 | 4 | 3 | — | | 5 | 7 | — | | 28 | 15 |
| 2008 | Brann | Tippeligaen | 17 | 1 | 3 | 3 | — | | 5 | 0 | — | | 25 | 4 |
| Total | | | 135 | 42 | 21 | 19 | — | | 16 | 8 | — | | 172 | 69 |
| Career total | | | 386 | 109 | 43 | 25 | 16 | 5 | 18 | 9 | 4 | 2 | 473 | 156 |

=== International ===
Appearances and goals by national team and year
| National team | Year | Apps | Goals |
|---|---|---|---|
| Scotland | 1999 | 1 | 0 |
| Total | | 1 | 0 |

== Honours ==
Dundee United

- Scottish League Cup: runner-up 1997–98
- Scottish Challenge Cup: runner-up 1995–96
- Scottish First Division: runner-up 1995–96
- Scottish Premier Division play-offs: 1996

Aberdeen

- Scottish Cup: runner-up 1999–2000
- Scottish League Cup: runner-up 1999–2000

SK Brann

- Norwegian Premier League: 2007; runner-up 2006
- Norwegian Cup: 2004

Livingston

- Scottish Second Division: 2010–11
- Scottish Third Division: 2009–10

Alloa Athletic

- Scottish Third Division: 2011–12

Pollok

- Scottish Junior Cup: runner-up 2015–16
- West of Scotland Cup: 2016–17
- Evening Times Champions Cup: 2014–15
- Central League Cup: 2015–16
- WOS Super League First Division: 2014–15

Rossvale

- WOS Second Division Central: 2014–15

Individual

- SPFA Young Player of the Year: 1996–97
- Verdens Gang NPL Player of the Year: 2004
- PFAS Third Division Player of the Year: 2010–11
