= Gary McSwegan =

Scottish footballer

Personal information
- Full name: Gary John McSwegan
- Date of birth: 24 September 1970 (age 56)
- Place of birth: Glasgow, Scotland
- Position: Striker

Youth career
- Rangers

Senior career*
Years	Team	Apps	(Gls)
1986–1993	Rangers	18	(4)
1993–1995	Notts County	62	(21)
1995–1998	Dundee United	92	(32)
1998–2002	Heart of Midlothian	82	(25)
2001–2002	→ Barnsley (loan)	5	(0)
2002	→ Luton Town (loan)	3	(0)
2002–2004	Kilmarnock	63	(17)
2004–2006	Ross County	34	(1)
2006–2007	Inverness Caledonian Thistle	9	(0)
2008–2009	Clyde	23	(2)

International career
1999	Scotland	2	(1)
- * Club domestic league appearances and goals

Gary John McSwegan (born 24 September 1970) is a Scottish former professional footballer. A striker, he began his career with Rangers, leaving to join Notts County in England. He returned to Scotland and had spells with Dundee United, Heart of Midlothian and Kilmarnock. Later in his career he went on to play for Ross County, Inverness Caledonian Thistle, and Clyde. He made two international appearances for Scotland whilst a Hearts player.

== Career ==
=== Domestic ===
McSwegan was born in Glasgow and started his career with Rangers, where he scored 5 goals in only 24 appearances during his six years at Ibrox, including a goal against Marseille in the 1992-93 Champions League. His first team opportunities at Rangers, however, appeared to be limited and in 1993 he joined Notts County for £400,000. One of his highlights at Notts County was scoring twice as they knocked Premier League side Tottenham Hotspur out of the 1994–95 Football League Cup. After two seasons in England he returned to Scotland with Dundee United for £375,000 where he remained for three seasons, scoring 42 goals.

He joined Hearts in 1998 on a free transfer where he scored 31 goals in 98 appearances. By 2002, however, McSwegan had fallen out of favour at Hearts and subsequently had loan spells in England with Barnsley and Luton Town before joining Kilmarnock where he remained for two seasons, scoring 17 goals.

His next professional club was Ross County where he played 39 games, scoring just 1 goal against Queen of the South in two injury-ravaged seasons. Despite these problems, McSwegan returned to top flight football, when signed by Inverness Caledonian Thistle in September 2006 on a short-term deal. McSwegan left Inverness Caledonian Thistle at the end of the 2006–07 season and joined Peterhead.

McSwegan joined Clyde on 14 March 2008, after previously training with the club and appearing in reserve games. He made his debut the following day, in a 1–1 draw against Stirling Albion in the Scottish First Division. He scored his first goal for the club in the final league game of the season, scoring the first in a 3–0 win over Stirling Albion. He then went on to score two goals in their successful relegation playoffs in ties against Alloa and Airdrie. In June 2008, McSwegan signed a one-year contract extension with the Broadwood side. He scored three goals in his second season, with two goals against Queen's Park in the League Cup and a late winner in the league against Livingston. This meant that all six of his goals for Clyde came in the Broadwood Stadium. McSwegan was released by Clyde in June 2009 along with the rest of the out of contract players, due to the club's financial position.

=== International ===
McSwegan won two caps for Scotland in 1999. He won his first cap on 5 October 1999, coming on as a late substitute in a EURO 2000 qualifier against Bosnia and Herzegovina, which Scotland won 1–0. His second and final cap came four days later, against Lithuania. McSwegan started the game, and scored Scotland's second goal in a 3–0 victory.

==== International goals ====
Scores and results list Scotland's goal tally first.

#	Date	Venue	Opponent	Score	Result	Competition
1	9 October 1999	Hampden Park, Glasgow, Scotland	Lithuania	2–0	3–0	UEFA Euro 2000 Qual.

== Career statistics ==
After 25 October 2008

Club performance			League		Cup		League Cup		Continental		Total	
Season	Club	League	Apps	Goals	Apps	Goals	Apps	Goals	Apps	Goals	Apps	Goals
Scotland			League		Scottish Cup		League Cup		Europe		Total	
1987–88	Rangers	Scottish Premier Division	18	4	N/A		N/A		N/A		18	4
1988–89	Rangers	Scottish Premier Division	18	4	N/A		N/A		N/A		18	4
1989–90	Rangers	Scottish Premier Division	18	4	N/A		N/A		N/A		18	4
1990–91	Rangers	Scottish Premier Division	18	4	N/A		N/A		N/A		18	4
1991–92	Rangers	Scottish Premier Division	18	4	N/A		N/A		N/A		18	4
1992–93	Rangers	Scottish Premier Division	18	4	N/A		N/A		N/A		18	4
England			League		FA Cup		League Cup		Europe		Total	
1993–94	Notts County	Football League First Division	62	21	N/A		N/A		-		62	21
1994–95	Notts County	Football League First Division	62	21	N/A		N/A		-		62	21
1995–96	Notts County	Football League Second Division	62	21	N/A		N/A		-		62	21
Scotland			League		Scottish Cup		League Cup		Europe		Total	
1995–96	Dundee United	Scottish First Division	26	17	3	0	-		-		29	17
1996–97	Dundee United	Scottish Premier Division	30	7	6	1	2	1	-		38	9
1997–98	Dundee United	Scottish Premier Division	32	5	2	1	5	5	4	6	43	17
1998–99	Dundee United	Scottish Premier League	5	3	-		2	1	-		7	4
1998–99	Heart of Midlothian	Scottish Premier League	20	8	1	0	-		-		21	8
1999–00	Heart of Midlothian	Scottish Premier League	31	13	3	2	3	0	-		37	15
2000–01	Heart of Midlothian	Scottish Premier League	26	5	4	1	1	0	4	1	35	7
2001–02	Heart of Midlothian	Scottish Premier League	5	0	-		-		-		5	0
England			League		FA Cup		League Cup		Europe		Total	
2001–02	Barnsley (loan)	Football League First Division	5	0	-		-		-		5	0
2001–02	Luton Town (loan)	Football League Second Division	3	0	-		-		-		3	0
Scotland			League		Scottish Cup		League Cup		Europe		Total	
2002–03	Kilmarnock	Scottish Premier League	32	11	1	0	-		-		33	11
2003–04	Kilmarnock	Scottish Premier League	31	5	2	1	1	0	-		34	6
2004–05	Ross County	Scottish First Division	17	0	-		2	0	-		19	0
2005–06	Ross County	Scottish First Division	16	1	1	0	-		-		17	1
2006–07	Inverness Caledonian Thistle	Scottish Premier League	9	0	2	0	-		-		11	0
2007–08	Clyde	Scottish First Division	6	1	-		-		-		6	1
2008–09	Clyde	Scottish First Division	7	1	-		1	2	-		8	3

== See also ==
- Clyde F.C. season 2007–08 | 2008–09
