= 1999–2000 in Scottish football =

Premier Division champions
- Rangers

First Division champions
- St Mirren

Second Division champions
- Clyde

Third Division champions
- Queen's Park

Scottish Cup winners
- Rangers

League Cup winners
- Celtic

Challenge Cup winners
- Alloa Athletic

Junior Cup winners
- Whitburn

Teams in Europe
- Celtic, Kilmarnock, Rangers, St Johnstone

Scotland national team
- UEFA Euro 2000 qualifying
- ← 1998–99 2000–01 →

The 1999–2000 season was the 103rd season of competitive football in Scotland.

== League Competitions ==
=== Scottish Premier League ===
Pos	Team	Pld	W	D	L	GF	GA	GD	Pts	Qualification or relegation
1	Rangers (C)	36	28	6	2	96	26	+70	90	Qualification for the Champions League second qualifying round
2	Celtic	36	21	6	9	90	38	+52	69	Qualification for the UEFA Cup qualifying round
3	Heart of Midlothian	36	15	9	12	47	40	+7	54	Qualification for the UEFA Cup qualifying round
4	Motherwell	36	14	10	12	49	63	−14	52	
5	St Johnstone	36	10	12	14	36	44	−8	42	
6	Hibernian	36	10	11	15	49	61	−12	41	
7	Dundee	36	12	5	19	45	64	−19	41	
8	Dundee United	36	11	6	19	34	57	−23	39	
9	Kilmarnock	36	8	13	15	38	52	−14	37	
10	Aberdeen	36	9	6	21	44	83	−39	33	Qualification for the UEFA Cup qualifying round (Note: Since Rangers, the winners of the 1999–2000 Scottish Cup, already qualified for the UEFA Champions League, Aberdeen, the losing finalist, earned a spot in the 2000–01 UEFA Cup. As the bottom team, Aberdeen were also due to take part in a three-team play-off with Dunfermline Athletic and Falkirk, but as Falkirk's stadium did not meet SPL criteria, the play-off did not take place.)

Updated to match(es) played on end of season. Source: Scottish Professional Football League
Rules for classification: 1) Points; 2) Goal difference; 3) Goals scored
(C) Champions

=== Scottish First Division ===
Pos	Team	Pld	W	D	L	GF	GA	GD	Pts	Promotion or relegation
1	St Mirren (C, P)	36	23	7	6	75	39	+36	76	Promotion to the Premier League
2	Dunfermline Athletic (P)	36	20	11	5	66	33	+33	71	Promotion to the Premier League
3	Falkirk	36	20	8	8	67	40	+27	68	
4	Livingston	36	19	7	10	60	45	+15	64	
5	Raith Rovers	36	17	8	11	55	40	+15	59	
6	Inverness CT	36	13	10	13	60	55	+5	49	
7	Ayr United	36	10	8	18	42	52	−10	38	
8	Morton	36	10	6	20	45	61	−16	36	
9	Airdrieonians	36	7	8	21	29	69	−40	29	
10	Clydebank (R)	36	1	7	28	17	82	−65	10	Relegation to the Second Division

Source: "1999-2000 First Division - SPFL Archive". SPFL.
Rules for classification: 1) points; 2) goal difference; 3) number of goals scored.
(C) Champions; (P) Promoted; (R) Relegated

=== Scottish Second Division ===
Pos	Team	Pld	W	D	L	GF	GA	GD	Pts	Promotion or relegation
1	Clyde (C, P)	36	18	11	7	65	37	+28	65	Promotion to the First Division
2	Alloa Athletic (P)	36	17	13	6	58	38	+20	64	Promotion to the First Division
3	Ross County (P)	36	18	8	10	57	39	+18	62	Promotion to the First Division
4	Arbroath	36	11	14	11	52	55	−3	47	
5	Partick Thistle	36	12	10	14	42	44	−2	46	
6	Stranraer	36	9	18	9	47	46	+1	45	
7	Stirling Albion	36	11	7	18	60	72	−12	40	
8	Stenhousemuir	36	10	8	18	44	59	−15	38	
9	Queen of the South	36	8	9	19	45	75	−30	33	
10	Hamilton Academical (R)	36	10	14	12	39	44	−5	29 (Note: 15 points deducted)	Relegation to the Third Division

Source: SPFL Archive
Rules for classification: 1) points; 2) goal difference; 3) number of goals scored.
(C) Champions; (P) Promoted; (R) Relegated

=== Scottish Third Division ===
In the 1999–2000 Scottish Third Division, Queen's Park pipped Berwick Rangers to the title on the final day of the season with a 3–2 victory at Cowdenbeath despite facing the threat of administration four months earlier, Berwick finished second and due to league reconstruction Forfar Athletic were also promoted in third place.

Pos	Team	Pld	W	D	L	GF	GA	GD	Pts	Promotion
1	Queen's Park (C, P)	36	20	9	7	54	37	+17	69	Promotion to the Second Division
2	Berwick Rangers (P)	36	19	9	8	53	30	+23	66	Promotion to the Second Division
3	Forfar Athletic (P)	36	17	10	9	64	40	+24	61	Promotion to the Second Division
4	East Fife	36	17	8	11	45	39	+6	59	
5	Cowdenbeath	36	15	9	12	59	43	+16	54	
6	Dumbarton	36	15	8	13	53	51	+2	53	
7	East Stirlingshire	36	11	7	18	28	50	−22	40	
8	Brechin City	36	10	8	18	42	51	−9	38	
9	Montrose	36	10	7	19	39	54	−15	37	
10	Albion Rovers	36	5	7	24	33	75	−42	22	

Source: "1999-2000 Third Division - SPFL Archive". SPFL (in Malay).
Rules for classification: 1) points; 2) goal difference; 3) number of goals scored.
(C) Champions; (P) Promoted

== Other honours ==
=== Cup honours ===
Competition	Winner	Score	Runner-up	Report
1999–2000 Scottish Cup	Rangers	4 – 0	Aberdeen	Wikipedia article
League Cup 1999–2000	Celtic	2 – 0	Aberdeen	
Challenge Cup 1999–2000	Alloa Athletic	4 – 4 (a.e.t.) (5 – 4 pen.)	Inverness CT	
Youth Cup	Heart of Midlothian	5 – 3	Rangers	
Junior Cup	Whitburn	2 – 2 (a.e.t.) (4 – 3 pen.)	Johnstone Burgh	

=== Individual honours ===
==== SPFA awards ====
Award	Winner	Club
Players' Player of the Year	(Australia) Mark Viduka	Celtic
Young Player of the Year	(Scotland) Kenny Miller	Hibernian

==== SFWA awards ====
Award	Winner	Club
Footballer of the Year	(Scotland) Barry Ferguson	Rangers
Young Player of the Year	Unknown	Unknown
Manager of the Year	(Netherlands) Dick Advocaat	Rangers

== Scottish clubs in Europe ==
Club	Competition(s)	Final round	Coef.
Rangers	UEFA Champions League; UEFA Europa League	Group stage Third round	11.00
Celtic	UEFA Europa League	Second round	6.00
St Johnstone	UEFA Europa League	First round	2.50
Kilmarnock	UEFA Europa League	First round	1.00

Average coefficient – 5.125

== Scotland national team ==
Date	Venue	Opponents	Score	Competition	Scotland scorer(s)	Report
4 September	Olimpijski Stadion, Sarajevo (A)	Bosnia and Herzegovina	2–1	ECQG9	Don Hutchison, Billy Dodds	BBC Sport
8 September	Kadrioru Stadium, Tallinn (A)	Estonia	0–0	ECQG9		BBC Sport
5 October	Ibrox Stadium, Glasgow (H)	Bosnia and Herzegovina	1–0	ECQG9	John Collins (pen.)	BBC Sport
9 October	Hampden Park, Glasgow (H)	Lithuania	3–0	ECQG9	Don Hutchison, Gary McSwegan, Colin Cameron	BBC Sport
13 November	Hampden Park, Glasgow (H)	England	0–2	ECQPO		BBC Sport
17 November	Wembley Stadium, London (A)	England	1–0	ECQPO	Don Hutchison	BBC Sport
29 March	Hampden Park, Glasgow (H)	France	0–2	Friendly		BBC Sport
26 April	Gelredome, Arnhem (A)	Netherlands	0–0	Friendly		BBC Sport
30 May	Lansdowne Road, Dublin (A)	Republic of Ireland	2–1	Friendly	Don Hutchison, Barry Ferguson	BBC Sport

Key:

- (A) = Away match
- (H) = Home match
- ECQG6 = European Championship Qualifying – Group 6
- ECQPO = European Championship Qualifying – Playoff
