= Kjell Olofsson =

Swedish footballer (born 1965)

Personal information
- Full name: Kjell Olofsson
- Date of birth: 23 July 1965 (age 61)
- Place of birth: Gothenburg, Sweden
- Height: 1.85 m (6 ft 1 in)
- Position: Striker

Senior career*
Years	Team	Apps	(Gls)
1984–1987	Knippla		
1988–1990	Västra Frölunda		
1991–1993	Warta		
1994	Örgryte		
1994–1995	Moss		
1996–1999	Dundee United	91	(38)
2000–2002	Moss	66	(14)
- * Club domestic league appearances and goals

Kjell Olofsson (born 23 July 1965) is a Swedish former footballer who played as a striker.

== Career ==
=== Dundee United ===
==== 1996–97 season ====
Olofsson joined Scottish club Dundee United during the 1996–97 season. Brought in by then manager Tommy McLean, he made his debut as a trialist in the 1–0 victory over Hearts at Tannadice on 26 October 1996, along with fellow Scandinavian Erik Pedersen. Kjell scored his first goal seven days later in a 3–1 win over Motherwell at Fir Park and he instantly became a fan-favourite. In his first season, he finished top goal scorer with a total of 13 goals in 28 games. He played his part in impressive wins over both Rangers and Celtic and United only lost four matches in which he appeared and finished in third place in the Premier Division, having been promoted from the First Division the previous season.

==== 1997–98 season ====
In his second season, he again finished top goalscorer with 23 goals. The season started promisingly for United, with an early 17–0 aggregate UEFA cup win over Andorran side CE Principat which saw Olofsson score his first, and only, European goal for the club. However, despite Kjell's goals United failed to live up to the glory of the previous season and only finished 7th in the Premier Division. He scored both goals in a 2–1 victory over Hibernian, which condemned the Edinburgh side to relegation to the First Division. The season did provide Kjell a medal, sadly for him and United fans it was only a runners up medal in the Scottish League Cup (they lost a distinctly one-sided final 3–0 to Celtic).

==== 1998–99 season ====
His final season at United was less successful. He failed to score and United failed to win in the opening six games and this was followed by the sacking of manager Tommy McLean. However, he was firmly in the plans of new manager Paul Sturrock, and in Sturrock's second game in charge (a 2–2 draw with local rivals Dundee) he netted his first goal of the season. Though 7 days later, in a match that would be United's first win of the season, it would turn sour for Kjell as he received only his second caution and first ever red card in Scottish football in the 3–1 win over St Johnstone on 26 September 1998. He was suspended for the following game, a 1–0 win over Aberdeen, though despite the win he was straight back in the team the next week. United fans had to wait another seven games to see his second goal of the season, which came in the 3–0 win against Aberdeen on 28 November 1998. On 2 January 1999 Kjell scored his third goal of the season in the 3–1 win over Dundee, a game that would trigger Kjell's scoring form as he scored seven goals in the next 12 games. His final goal for the club came at Pittodrie against Aberdeen in the 4–0 win on 17 April 1999, while his final appearance was in a 2–1 loss to Celtic on the final day of the season (23 May 1999).

Several years later Kjell made a cameo appearance at Tannadice, dressed as Terry The Terror (the club mascot) before a home league game.

=== Moss FK ===
Olofsson's last known club was the club from which he joined Dundee United - Norwegian club Moss F.K. He retired as a professional player in 2002 and returned to his family's furniture business.
