= 1995–96 Dundee F.C. season =

Dundee
1995–96 season
- Manager: Jim Duffy
- Stadium: Dens Park
- First Division: 5th
- Scottish Cup: 3rd round
- League Cup: Finalists
- Challenge Cup: Quarter-finals
- Top goalscorer: League: Jim Hamilton (14); All: Jim Hamilton (19)
Home colours

The 1995–96 season was the 94th season in which Dundee competed at a Scottish national level, playing in the Scottish First Division. Dundee would finish in 5th place, their lowest league position since the 1938–39 season. Dundee would also compete in the Scottish League Cup, the Scottish Cup and the Scottish Challenge Cup, where they were knocked out by Clyde in the 3rd round of the Scottish Cup, and by Stenhousemuir in the quarter-finals of the Challenge Cup. They would make it to the final of the League Cup, before being defeated by Aberdeen at Hampden Park.

== Scottish First Division ==
Statistics provided by Dee Archive.

Match day	Date	Opponent	H/A	Score	Dundee scorer(s)	Attendance
1	12 August	St Johnstone	A	2–0	Main (o.g.), Britton	5,263
2	26 August	Airdrieonians	H	1–1	Cargill	3,536
3	2 September	Clydebank	A	1–1	Hamilton	1,390
4	9 September	Greenock Morton	A	2–2	Tosh, Farningham	4,500
5	16 September	Hamilton Academical	H	1–1	Shaw	2,395
6	23 September	Dumbarton	A	5–1	Shaw (2), Martin (o.g.), Bain, Hamilton	1,207
7	30 September	Dundee United	H	2–3	Hamilton (2) (pen.)	10,395
8	7 October	St Mirren	H	3–1	Tosh, Hamilton, Wieghorst	3,555
9	14 October	Dunfermline Athletic	A	1–0	Tosh	6,700
10	21 October	Clydebank	H	1–1	N. Duffy	2,708
11	28 October	Airdrieonians	A	3–2	Wieghorst (2), Hamilton	1,952
12	4 November	Hamilton Academical	A	2–1	Tosh, N. Duffy	1,131
13	11 November	Greenock Morton	H	0–0		4,060
14	18 November	Dundee United	A	3–2	Shaw (2), Wieghorst	10,752
15	2 December	St Mirren	A	2–1	Shaw, Tosh	2,364
16	5 December	Dumbarton	H	1–1	Tosh	2,804
17	9 December	Dunfermline Athletic	H	2–4	Shaw, Hamilton (pen.)	4,642
18	16 December	St Johnstone	H	0–1		3,034
19	6 January	Hamilton Academical	H	2–1	Charnley, Farningham	2,020
20	9 January	Dundee United	H	0–2		9,199
21	13 January	Greenock Morton	A	0–1		4,500
22	16 January	Clydebank	A	1–0	Britton	603
23	20 January	St Mirren	H	1–2	Charnley	2,698
24	23 January	Dumbarton	A	2–1	Hamilton (2)	737
25	13 February	St Johnstone	A	2–3	McKeown, Farningham	3,952
26	24 February	Airdrieonians	H	2–0	McCann, Hamilton	2,116
27	2 March	Dumbarton	H	3–0	Hamilton (2), Tosh	1,712
28	6 March	Dunfermline Athletic	A	1–1	N. Duffy	5,500
29	16 March	Dundee United	A	0–2		9,831
30	23 March	Hamilton Academical	A	1–0	Tosh	828
31	30 March	Greenock Morton	H	1–1	Tosh	2,734
32	6 April	St Mirren	A	1–2	Hamilton	2,115
33	13 April	Dunfermline Athletic	H	1–1	O'Driscoll	3,218
34	20 April	Clydebank	H	3–0	Charnley, Hamilton, McCann	1,403
35	27 April	Airdrieonians	A	0–0		1,454
36	4 May	St Johnstone	H	0–0		2,710

=== League table ===
Pos	Team	Pld	W	D	L	GF	GA	GD	Pts
3	Greenock Morton	36	20	7	9	57	39	+18	67
4	St Johnstone	36	19	8	9	60	36	+24	65
5	Dundee	36	15	12	9	53	40	+13	57
6	St Mirren	36	13	8	15	46	51	−5	47
7	Clydebank	36	10	10	16	39	58	−19	40

Source: RSSSF
Rules for classification: 1) points; 2) goal difference; 3) number of goals scored.

== Scottish League Cup ==
Statistics provided by Dee Archive.

Match day	Date	Opponent	H/A	Score	Dundee scorer(s)	Attendance
2nd round	19 August	East Stirlingshire	A	6–0	Wieghorst, Hamilton, McCann (4)	1,163
3rd round	30 August	Kilmarnock	H	3–1	Shaw, Wieghorst, Hamilton	4,103
Quarter-finals	20 September	Heart of Midlothian	H	4–4	Shaw (2), Tosh, Wieghorst	9,528
Dundee win 5–4 on penalties
Semi-finals	25 October	Airdrieonians	N	2–1	Tosh, McCann	8,930
Final	6 November	Aberdeen	N	0–2		33,096

== Scottish Cup ==
Statistics provided by Dee Archive.

Match day	Date	Opponent	H/A	Score	Dundee scorer(s)	Attendance
3rd round	31 January	Clyde	A	1–3	N. Duffy	2,000

== Scottish Challenge Cup ==
Statistics provided by Dee Archive.

Match day	Date	Opponent	H/A	Score	Dundee scorer(s)	Attendance
1st round	22 August	East Fife	A	4–2	Anderson, Hamilton (3)	1,157
2nd round	11 September	Cowdenbeath	H	3–0	Cargill, Anderson, Shaw	1,001
Quarter-finals	25 September	Stenhousemuir	H	1–3	Cargill	1,112

== Player statistics ==
Statistics provided by Dee Archive

No.	Pos	Nat	Player	Total		First Division		Scottish Cup		League Cup		Challenge Cup	
No.	Pos	Nat	Player	Apps	Goals	Apps	Goals	Apps	Goals	Apps	Goals	Apps	Goals
	MF	(Poland) POL	Dariusz Adamczuk	13	0	8+5	0	0	0	0	0	0	0
	MF	(Scotland) SCO	Iain Anderson	24	2	9+8	0	0	0	0+4	0	3	2
	DF	(Scotland) SCO	Kevin Bain	16	1	7+3	1	0	0	2+1	0	2+1	0
	FW	(Scotland) SCO	Gerry Britton	31	2	15+9	2	1	0	2+2	0	0+2	0
	MF	(Scotland) SCO	Graeme Cadger	1	0	0	0	0	0	0	0	0+1	0
	MF	(Scotland) SCO	Andy Cargill	25	3	11+7	1	1	0	3	0	3	2
	MF	(Scotland) SCO	Chic Charnley	12	3	12	3	0	0	0	0	0	0
	MF	(Scotland) SCO	Marcus Dailly	1	0	0	0	0	0	0	0	1	0
	DF	(Scotland) SCO	Jim Duffy	23	0	19	0	0	0	2+1	0	1	0
	DF	(Scotland) SCO	Neil Duffy	37	4	31	3	1	1	4	0	1	0
	MF	(Scotland) SCO	Ray Farningham	23	3	13+5	3	0	0	2+1	0	2	0
	FW	(Scotland) SCO	Jim Hamilton	42	19	30+3	14	1	0	5	2	3	3
	DF	(Scotland) SCO	Mark Hutchison	2	0	0+1	0	0	0	0	0	1	0
	MF	(Scotland) SCO	Darren Magee	2	0	0+1	0	1	0	0	0	0	0
	DF	(Scotland) SCO	Roddy Manley	22	0	17	0	0	0	4	0	1	0
	GK	(Scotland) SCO	Paul Mathers	3	0	1	0	1	0	0	0	1	0
	DF	(Scotland) SCO	Andy Matheson	1	0	0	0	0	0	0	0	1	0
	MF	(Scotland) SCO	Roy McBain	8	0	3+3	0	0	0	0	0	2	0
	FW	(Scotland) SCO	Neil McCann	29	7	22	2	0	0	5	5	2	0
	MF	(England) ENG	Gary McKeown	18	1	13+4	1	1	0	0	0	0	0
	DF	(Scotland) SCO	Tommy McQueen	28	0	21	0	1	0	3+1	0	2	0
	FW	(Scotland) SCO	Jerry O'Driscoll	6	1	1+4	1	0	0	0	0	0+1	0
	GK	(France) FRA	Michel Pageaud	42	0	35	0	0	0	5	0	2	0
	MF	(Scotland) SCO	Gavin Rae	6	0	4+2	0	0	0	0	0	0	0
	FW	(Scotland) SCO	George Shaw	45	11	33+3	7	1	0	4+1	3	2+1	1
	DF	(Scotland) SCO	Barry Smith	21	0	20	0	1	0	0	0	0	0
	MF	(Scotland) SCO	Mike Teasdale	2	0	1	0	0	0	0	0	0+1	0
	FW	(Scotland) SCO	Paul Tosh	37	11	29+1	9	0+1	0	4+1	2	1	0
	DF	(Scotland) SCO	Craig Tully	4	0	2	0	0+1	0	0	0	0+1	0
	DF	(Slovakia) SVK	Dušan Vrťo	35	0	25+2	0	1	0	5	0	2	0
	MF	(Denmark) DEN	Morten Wieghorst	20	7	14	4	0	0	5	3	0+1	0

== See also ==
- List of Dundee F.C. seasons
