= 1993–94 Dundee F.C. season =

Dundee
1993–94 season
- Manager: Simon Stainrod (until Aug. 1993); Jim Duffy (from Aug. 1993)
- Stadium: Dens Park
- Premier Division: 12th (relegated)
- Scottish Cup: Quarter-finals
- League Cup: 3rd round
- Top goalscorer: League: Dragutin Ristić & George Shaw (6); All: George Shaw (8)
Home colours

The 1993–94 season was the 92nd season in which Dundee competed at a Scottish national level, playing in the Scottish Premier Division. Dundee would finish 12th, and would be relegated to the First Division. Dundee would also compete in both the Scottish League Cup and the Scottish Cup, where they were knocked out by Hibernian in the 3rd round of the League Cup, and by Kilmarnock in the quarter-finals of the Scottish Cup.

== Scottish Premier Division ==
Statistics provided by Dee Archive.

Match day	Date	Opponent	H/A	Score	Dundee scorer(s)	Attendance
1	7 August	Kilmarnock	A	0–1		8,162
2	14 August	Motherwell	H	1–2	Dijkstra (o.g.)	4,356
3	21 August	Aberdeen	H	1–1	Dodds	7,655
4	28 August	Hibernian	A	0–2		5,491
5	4 September	Rangers	H	1–1	Paterson	14,364
6	11 September	Dundee United	A	0–1		10,664
7	18 September	Raith Rovers	H	0–1		4,654
8	25 September	St Johnstone	A	1–2	Ristić	4,203
9	2 October	Heart of Midlothian	H	2–0	Paterson, Ristić	5,021
10	5 October	Partick Thistle	H	2–2	Dodds, Pittman	4,690
11	9 October	Celtic	A	1–2	Dodds (pen.)	16,994
12	16 October	Motherwell	A	0–1		5,126
13	23 October	Kilmarnock	H	1–0	Adamczuk	4,537
14	30 October	Aberdeen	A	0–1		11,886
15	6 November	Hibernian	H	3–2	Pittman, Ristić, Ritchie	4,685
16	10 November	Rangers	A	1–3	Dodds	39,477
17	13 November	Heart of Midlothian	A	2–1	Ritchie, Czachowski	7,884
18	20 November	St Johnstone	H	0–1		4,884
19	1 December	Raith Rovers	A	1–2	Wieghorst	3,609
20	4 December	Partick Thistle	A	2–3	Tosh, Dodds	3,595
21	7 December	Dundee United	H	1–2	Farningham	9,156
22	11 December	Celtic	H	1–1	Ristić	8,730
23	18 December	Motherwell	H	1–3	Ristić	4,337
24	1 January	Aberdeen	H	0–1		7,406
25	4 January	Kilmarnock	A	0–1		7,415
26	8 January	Hibernian	A	0–2		5,369
27	15 January	Rangers	H	1–1	Wieghorst	11,014
28	22 January	Raith Rovers	H	2–2	Shaw (pen.), Blake	3,934
29	5 February	Dundee United	A	1–1	Ristić	10,622
30	12 February	St Johnstone	A	1–1	Farningham	5,517
31	26 February	Heart of Midlothian	H	0–2		4,115
32	5 March	Partick Thistle	H	1–0	Shaw	3,360
33	19 March	Motherwell	A	1–3	McQuillan	6,127
34	26 March	Kilmarnock	H	3–0	Britton, Blake, McCann	3,348
35	29 March	Dundee United	H	1–1	N. Duffy	12,574
36	2 April	Raith Rovers	A	1–1	Shaw	2,200
37	6 April	Celtic	A	1–1	Martin (o.g.)	16,552
38	9 April	St Johnstone	H	0–1		3,586
39	16 April	Heart of Midlothian	A	2–0	Shaw (2)	7,028
40	23 April	Celtic	H	0–2		5,982
41	27 April	Partick Thistle	A	0–1		3,604
42	30 April	Aberdeen	A	1–1	N. Duffy	7,568
43	7 May	Hibernian	H	4–0	McKeown, Shaw, Pittman, Anderson (pen.)	3,012
44	14 May	Rangers	A	0–0		41,620

=== League table ===
Pos	Team	Pld	W	D	L	GF	GA	GD	Pts	Qualification or relegation
8	Kilmarnock	44	12	16	16	36	45	−9	40	
9	Partick Thistle	44	12	16	16	46	57	−11	40	
10	St Johnstone (R)	44	10	20	14	35	47	−12	40	Relegation to the 1994–95 Scottish First Division
11	Raith Rovers (R)	44	6	19	19	46	80	−34	31	Relegation to the 1994–95 Scottish First Division
12	Dundee (R)	44	8	13	23	42	57	−15	29	Relegation to the 1994–95 Scottish First Division

Source: RSSSF
Rules for classification: 1) points; 2) goal difference; 3) number of goals scored.
(R) Relegated

== Scottish League Cup ==
Statistics provided by Dee Archive.

Match day	Date	Opponent	H/A	Score	Dundee scorer(s)	Attendance
3rd round	11 August	Meadowbank Thistle	A	1–1	Davidson (o.g.)	811
Dundee won 3–1 on penalties
4th round	24 August	Hibernian	A	1–2	Neilsen	6,473

== Scottish Cup ==
Statistics provided by Dee Archive.

Match day	Date	Opponent	H/A	Score	Dundee scorer(s)	Attendance
3rd round	29 January	Clydebank	A	1–1	Tosh	2,170
3R replay	8 February	Clydebank	N	2–1	Britton, Shaw	856
4th round	20 February	St Mirren	H	3–1	Britton (2) (pen.), Shaw	6,040
Quarter-final	12 March	Kilmarnock	A	0–1		10,446

== Player statistics ==
Statistics provided by Dee Archive

No.	Pos	Nat	Player	Total		First Division		Scottish Cup		League Cup	
No.	Pos	Nat	Player	Apps	Goals	Apps	Goals	Apps	Goals	Apps	Goals
	MF	(Poland) POL	Dariusz Adamczuk	11	1	7+3	1	0	0	1	0
	MF	(Scotland) SCO	Iain Anderson	2	1	0+2	1	0	0	0	0
	MF	(Australia) AUS	Lachie Armstrong	1	0	0+1	0	0	0	0	0
	DF	(Scotland) SCO	Kevin Bain	7	0	4+3	0	0	0	0	0
	DF	(Jamaica) JAM	Noel Blake	27	2	23	2	4	0	0	0
	FW	(Scotland) SCO	Gerry Britton	20	4	15+2	1	3	3	0	0
	MF	(Scotland) SCO	Max Christie	2	0	1	0	0	0	1	0
	MF	(Poland) POL	Piotr Czachowski	18	1	18	1	0	0	0	0
	DF	(France) FRA	Lionel David	2	0	1	0	0	0	1	0
	DF	(Scotland) SCO	Alan Dinnie	10	0	7	0	3	0	0	0
	FW	(Scotland) SCO	Billy Dodds	26	5	23+1	5	0	0	2	0
	DF	(Scotland) SCO	Jim Duffy	35	0	32	0	3	0	0	0
	DF	(Scotland) SCO	Neil Duffy	12	2	12	2	0	0	0	0
	MF	(Scotland) SCO	Ray Farningham	28	2	20+4	2	1+3	0	0	0
	DF	(Scotland) SCO	Stephen Frail	36	0	28+4	0	2+1	0	1	0
	FW	(Scotland) SCO	Jim Hamilton	1	0	0+1	0	0	0	0	0
	GK	(Scotland) SCO	Paul Mathers	39	0	33	0	4	0	2	0
	FW	(Scotland) SCO	Neil McCann	25	1	20+1	1	4	0	0	0
	DF	(England) ENG	Jamie McGowan	16	0	11+3	0	0	0	2	0
	MF	(England) ENG	Gary McKeown	20	1	18+1	1	0	0	1	0
	MF	(Scotland) SCO	Grant McMartin	4	0	1+2	0	0	0	1	0
	DF	(Scotland) SCO	John McQuillan	39	1	27+7	1	4	0	1	0
	FW	(Canada) CAN	Domenic Mobilio	2	0	0+2	0	0	0	0	0
	FW	(Denmark) DEN	Henrik Neilsen	1	1	0	0	0	0	0+1	1
	GK	(France) FRA	Michel Pageaud	11	0	11	0	0	0	0	0
	DF	(Scotland) SCO	Gary Paterson	19	3	17+2	2	0	1	0	0
	DF	(United States) USA	Steve Pittman	41	3	35+1	3	4	0	1	0
	FW	(Croatia) CRO	Dragutin Ristić	18	6	16+1	6	0+1	0	0	0
	FW	(Scotland) SCO	Paul Ritchie	19	2	10+7	2	1	0	1	0
	FW	(Scotland) SCO	George Shaw	21	8	17	6	4	2	0	0
	FW	(England) ENG	Simon Stainrod	1	0	1	0	0	0	0	0
	MF	(Scotland) SCO	Mike Teasdale	5	0	2+3	0	0	0	0	0
	FW	(Scotland) SCO	Paul Tosh	31	2	14+12	1	0+3	1	2	0
	DF	(Scotland) SCO	Craig Tully	1	0	1	0	0	0	0	0
	DF	(Slovakia) SVK	Dušan Vrťo	43	0	38	0	3	0	2	0
	MF	(Denmark) DEN	Morten Wieghorst	29	2	21+2	2	4	0	2	0

== See also ==
- List of Dundee F.C. seasons
