= 1994–95 Dundee F.C. season =

Dundee
1994–95 season
- Manager: Jim Duffy
- Stadium: Dens Park
- First Division: 3rd
- Scottish Cup: 4th round
- League Cup: 3rd round
- Challenge Cup: Finalists
- Top goalscorer: League: George Shaw (16); All: George Shaw (20)
Home colours

The 1994–95 season was the 93rd season in which Dundee competed at a Scottish national level, playing in the Scottish First Division after being relegated the previous season. Dundee would finish in 3rd place and miss out a chance for promotion by goal difference. Dundee would also compete in both the Scottish League Cup and the Scottish Cup, where they were knocked out by Celtic in the 3rd round of the League Cup, and by Raith Rovers in the 4th round of the Scottish Cup. They would also compete in the Scottish Challenge Cup and would reach the final, before being defeated by Airdrieonians.

== Scottish First Division ==
Statistics provided by Dee Archive.

Match day	Date	Opponent	H/A	Score	Dundee scorer(s)	Attendance
1	13 August	St Mirren	H	2–0	Shaw, Britton	4,125
2	20 August	Stranraer	H	3–1	Britton (2), McCaffrey (o.g.)	3,186
3	27 August	St Johnstone	A	1–0	Pittman	6,021
4	3 September	Airdrieonians	H	1–1	Farningham	4,020
5	10 September	Clydebank	H	2–5	Britton (2)	1,593
6	24 September	Ayr United	A	2–3	Britton, Hamilton	1,901
7	1 October	Dunfermline Athletic	H	4–4	Shaw (2), Tosh, Britton	4,784
8	8 October	Hamilton Academical	H	2–0	Hamilton, Britton	2,370
9	15 October	Raith Rovers	A	1–1	Anderson	3,834
10	22 October	St Mirren	A	2–1	McCann (2)	2,758
11	29 October	St Johnstone	H	1–0	Shaw	4,160
12	12 November	Clydebank	H	2–0	Bain (pen.), Shaw	2,240
13	19 November	Airdrieonians	A	1–2	Britton	2,051
14	23 November	Stranraer	A	2–0	Tosh, Cargill	850
15	26 November	Ayr United	H	1–1	Tosh	2,506
16	3 December	Dunfermline Athletic	A	1–0	Ritchie	6,065
17	10 December	Raith Rovers	H	2–1	Hamilton, Wieghorst	3,482
18	26 December	Hamilton Academical	A	1–0	Hamilton	1,552
19	31 December	St Mirren	H	4–0	Hamilton, Shaw (3)	3,500
20	7 January	Stranraer	H	2–0	N. Duffy, Ritchie	2,615
21	11 January	St Johnstone	A	2–2	Hamilton, Britton	5,632
22	14 January	Airdrieonians	H	0–1		4,030
23	21 January	Clydebank	A	3–0	Jack (o.g.), N. Duffy, Hamilton	967
24	4 February	Dunfermline Athletic	H	2–3	Tosh, Britton	5,896
25	11 February	Ayr United	A	0–1		2,042
26	25 February	Raith Rovers	A	0–0		5,885
27	4 March	Hamilton Academical	H	2–0	Britton, Teasdale	2,342
28	18 March	Clydebank	H	3–2	Shaw (2), Farningham	1,788
29	25 March	Airdrieonians	A	3–0	Farningham, Shaw (2)	2,528
30	1 April	Dunfermline Athletic	A	1–1	Shaw	8,407
31	8 April	Ayr United	H	1–1	N. Duffy	2,765
32	15 April	Hamilton Academical	A	4–1	Shaw, Hamilton (3)	1,471
33	22 April	Raith Rovers	H	0–2		7,828
34	29 April	St Mirren	A	0–1		2,976
35	6 May	St Johnstone	H	2–1	Hamilton (pen.), Shaw	3,906
36	13 May	Stranraer	A	5–0	Hamilton (pen.), Wieghorst (2), Shaw, Tosh	1,530

=== League table ===
Pos	Team	Pld	W	D	L	GF	GA	GD	Pts	Promotion or relegation
1	Raith Rovers (C, P)	36	19	12	5	54	32	+22	69	Promotion to the Premier Division and qualification for UEFA Cup Preliminary round (Note: Raith Rovers qualified for the UEFA Cup as League Cup winners)
2	Dunfermline Athletic	36	18	14	4	73	37	+36	68	Qualification for the Play-off
3	Dundee	36	20	8	8	65	36	+29	68	
4	Airdrieonians	36	17	10	9	50	33	+17	61	
5	St Johnstone	36	14	14	8	59	39	+20	56	

Source: RSSSF and statto
Rules for classification: 1) points; 2) goal difference; 3) number of goals scored.
(C) Champions; (P) Promoted

== Scottish League Cup ==
Statistics provided by Dee Archive.

Match day	Date	Opponent	H/A	Score	Dundee scorer(s)	Attendance
2nd round	17 August	Inverness CT	H	3–0	Shaw, Tosh (2)	3,112
3rd round	31 August	Celtic	H	1–2	Farningham	11,431

== Scottish Cup ==
Statistics provided by Dee Archive.

Match day	Date	Opponent	H/A	Score	Dundee scorer(s)	Attendance
3rd round	29 January	Partick Thistle	A	2–1	Shaw, Hamilton	6,320
4th round	18 February	Raith Rovers	H	1–2	Shaw	7,622

== Scottish Challenge Cup ==
Statistics provided by Dee Archive.

Match day	Date	Opponent	H/A	Score	Dundee scorer(s)	Attendance
1st round	17 September	Arbroath	H	5–0	Britton (4), Shaw	2,205
2nd round	28 September	Inverness CT	A	1–1	Wieghorst	2,000
Dundee win 4–3 on penalties
Quarter-finals	4 October	Greenock Morton	H	2–1	Britton, Wieghorst	2,199
Semi-finals	18 October	Dunfermline Athletic	A	2–1	Bain (pen.), McCann	7,154
Final	6 November	Airdrieonians	N	2–3 (A.E.T.)	Hay (o.g.), Britton	8,844

== Player statistics ==
Statistics provided by Dee Archive

No.	Pos	Nat	Player	Total		First Division		Scottish Cup		League Cup		Challenge Cup	
No.	Pos	Nat	Player	Apps	Goals	Apps	Goals	Apps	Goals	Apps	Goals	Apps	Goals
	MF	(Scotland) SCO	Iain Anderson	12	1	4+6	1	0	0	1	0	1	0
	DF	(Scotland) SCO	Kevin Bain	28	4	20	1	4	2	0	0	4	1
	DF	(Jamaica) JAM	Noel Blake	37	0	29+2	0	1	0	2	0	3	0
	FW	(Scotland) SCO	Gerry Britton	35	18	23+3	12	2	0	2	0	5	6
	MF	(Scotland) SCO	Andy Cargill	14	1	10+4	1	0	0	0	0	0	0
	MF	(Scotland) SCO	Marcus Dailly	2	0	1	0	0	0	0	0	1	0
	DF	(Scotland) SCO	Alan Dinnie	2	0	1	0	0	0	1	0	0	0
	DF	(Scotland) SCO	Jim Duffy	24	0	16	0	2	0	1	0	5	0
	DF	(Scotland) SCO	Neil Duffy	29	3	23+1	3	2	0	2	0	1	0
	MF	(Scotland) SCO	Ray Farningham	35	4	25+2	3	1	0	1+1	1	5	0
	FW	(Scotland) SCO	Jim Hamilton	33	13	23+5	12	1	1	0	0	1+3	0
	DF	(Scotland) SCO	Mark Hutchison	10	0	7	0	0	0	0	0	2+1	0
	GK	(Scotland) SCO	Paul Mathers	4	0	2+1	0	0	0	0	0	1	0
	FW	(Scotland) SCO	Neil McCann	38	3	29+3	2	2	0	2	0	2	1
	MF	(England) ENG	Gary McKeown	2	0	0+1	0	0	0	1	0	0	0
	DF	(Scotland) SCO	John McQuillan	39	0	30+2	0	1	0	2	0	4	0
	GK	(France) FRA	Michel Pageaud	42	0	34	0	2	0	2	0	4	0
	DF	(United States) USA	Steve Pittman	4	1	3	1	0	0	1	0	0	0
	FW	(Scotland) SCO	Paul Ritchie	16	2	6+9	2	0+1	0	0	0	0	0
	FW	(Scotland) SCO	George Shaw	43	20	33+1	16	2	2	2	1	5	1
	MF	(Scotland) SCO	Mike Teasdale	20	1	13+4	1	0	0	0+1	0	1+1	0
	FW	(Scotland) SCO	Paul Tosh	34	7	13+14	5	0+1	0	0+2	2	4	0
	DF	(Slovakia) SVK	Dušan Vrťo	28	0	22	0	2	0	1	0	2+1	0
	MF	(Denmark) DEN	Morten Wieghorst	36	5	29	3	2	0	1	0	4	2

== See also ==
- List of Dundee F.C. seasons
