= 1996–97 Dundee F.C. season =

Dundee
1996–97 season
- Manager: Jim Duffy (1996); John McCormack (1997)
- Stadium: Dens Park
- First Division: 3rd
- Scottish Cup: 4th round
- League Cup: Semi-finals
- Challenge Cup: Quarter-finals
- Top goalscorer: League: Jerry O'Driscoll (10); All: Jerry O'Driscoll (11)
Home colours

The 1996–97 season was the 95th season in which Dundee competed at a Scottish national level, playing in the Scottish First Division. Dundee would finish in 3rd place, 2 points away from the promotion play-offs. Dundee would also compete in the Scottish League Cup, the Scottish Cup and the Scottish Challenge Cup, where they were knocked out by Greenock Morton in the 4th round of the Scottish Cup, by St Johnstone in the quarter-finals of the Challenge Cup, and by Heart of Midlothian in the semi-finals of the League Cup.

== Scottish First Division ==
Statistics provided by Dee Archive.

Match day	Date	Opponent	H/A	Score	Dundee scorer(s)	Attendance
1	17 August	Partick Thistle	A	0–0		3,160
2	24 August	Greenock Morton	H	2–1	Charnley, Tosh	3,561
3	31 August	Stirling Albion	A	1–1	Shaw	1,791
4	7 September	Airdrieonians	H	0–1		2,756
5	14 September	St Mirren	A	1–0	Ferguson	2,591
6	21 September	East Fife	H	2–0	Raeside, Hamilton	2,511
7	28 September	St Johnstone	A	1–0	Shaw	5,112
8	5 October	Clydebank	H	2–1	Shaw, Adamczuk	2,585
9	12 October	Falkirk	A	1–0	Raeside	2,855
10	19 October	Partick Thistle	H	0–2		3,303
11	26 October	Greenock Morton	A	0–0		3,320
12	2 November	St Mirren	H	0–1		2,631
13	9 November	Airdrieonians	A	0–0		2,173
14	16 November	St Johnstone	H	0–1		3,840
15	30 November	Clydebank	A	0–0		470
16	7 December	Falkirk	H	2–0	Anderson, Rae	2,198
17	14 December	Stirling Albion	H	1–1	O'Driscoll	1,828
18	17 December	East Fife	A	7–1	Winnie, O'Driscoll, Rae, Anderson (2), Raeside, Tosh	725
19	26 December	Partick Thistle	A	2–2	Anderson, Tosh	2,695
20	28 December	East Fife	H	6–0	Tosh, Power (2), Charnley, O'Driscoll (2)	2,312
21	1 January	St Johnstone	A	2–7	Charnley, O'Driscoll (pen.)	7,087
22	11 January	Airdrieonians	H	2–1	O'Driscoll, Power	2,469
23	18 January	Clydebank	H	1–0	O'Driscoll	1,954
24	28 January	St Mirren	A	2–3	Shaw, Robertson	2,407
25	1 February	Falkirk	A	1–1	O'Driscoll	2,502
26	8 February	Stirling Albion	A	1–0	Shaw	1,452
27	22 February	Greenock Morton	H	1–0	O'Driscoll	2,264
28	1 March	East Fife	A	1–1	Power	1,147
29	15 March	St Johnstone	H	0–0		5,634
30	22 March	Clydebank	A	0–0		710
31	5 April	Falkirk	H	0–2		3,474
32	12 April	Airdrieonians	A	0–2		2,530
33	19 April	St Mirren	H	2–0	Anderson, McKeown	2,462
34	26 April	Partick Thistle	H	1–1	Annand	2,416
35	3 May	Greenock Morton	A	1–1	J. Anderson (o.g.)	1,617
36	10 May	Stirling Albion	H	4–2	Annand, Raeside, O'Driscoll, Tait (o.g.)	2,089

=== League table ===
Pos	Team	Pld	W	D	L	GF	GA	GD	Pts	Promotion or relegation
1	St Johnstone (C, P)	36	24	8	4	74	23	+51	80	Promotion to the Premier Division
2	Airdrieonians	36	15	15	6	56	34	+22	60	Qualification for the Play-off
3	Dundee	36	15	13	8	47	33	+14	58	
4	St Mirren	36	17	7	12	48	41	+7	58	
5	Falkirk	36	15	9	12	42	39	+3	54	

Source: RSSSF
Rules for classification: 1) points; 2) goal difference; 3) number of goals scored.
(C) Champions; (P) Promoted

== Scottish League Cup ==
Statistics provided by Dee Archive.

Match day	Date	Opponent	H/A	Score	Dundee scorer(s)	Attendance
2nd round	13 August	Dumbarton	H	2–1	Raeside, Hamilton	1,872
3rd round	3 September	Dundee United	A	2–2	Hamilton (2) (pen.)	11,902
Dundee win 4–2 on penalties
Quarter-finals	17 September	Aberdeen	H	2–1	Tosh, Hamilton	8,650
Semi-finals	23 October	Heart of Midlothian	N	1–3	Hamilton	15,653

== Scottish Cup ==
Statistics provided by Dee Archive.

Match day	Date	Opponent	H/A	Score	Dundee scorer(s)	Attendance
3rd round	25 January	Queen of the South	H	3–1	Power, O'Driscoll, Anderson	2,391
4th round	15 February	Greenock Morton	A	2–2	Power, Anderson	4,195
4R replay	18 February	Greenock Morton	H	0–1		4,346

== Scottish Challenge Cup ==
Statistics provided by Dee Archive.

Match day	Date	Opponent	H/A	Score	Dundee scorer(s)	Attendance
1st round	9 August	Stenhousemuir	A	3–0	McQueen, Magee, Tosh	1,304
2nd round	27 August	Airdrieonians	A	2–0	Tosh, Shaw	1,313
Quarter-finals	10 September	St Johnstone	H	1–5	Farningham	2,346

== Player statistics ==
Statistics provided by Dee Archive

No.	Pos	Nat	Player	Total		First Division		Scottish Cup		League Cup		Challenge Cup	
No.	Pos	Nat	Player	Apps	Goals	Apps	Goals	Apps	Goals	Apps	Goals	Apps	Goals
	MF	(Poland) POL	Dariusz Adamczuk	39	1	30	1	3	0	4	0	2	0
	MF	(Scotland) SCO	Iain Anderson	42	7	28+7	5	2+1	2	1+1	0	1+1	0
	FW	(Scotland) SCO	Eddie Annand	5	2	5	2	0	0	0	0	0	0
	DF	(Scotland) SCO	Kevin Bain	17	0	12	0	0	0	4	0	1	0
	FW	(Scotland) SCO	Graham Bayne	2	0	0+2	0	0	0	0	0	0	0
	MF	(Scotland) SCO	Andy Cargill	3	0	0+3	0	0	0	0	0	0	0
	MF	(Scotland) SCO	Chic Charnley	21	3	15	3	0	0	4	0	1+1	0
	DF	(France) FRA	Laurent Croci	1	0	1	0	0	0	0	0	0	0
	DF	(Scotland) SCO	Jim Duffy	5	0	2	0	0	0	1	0	2	0
	MF	(Scotland) SCO	John Elliot	5	0	1+3	0	0	0	0+1	0	0	0
	MF	(Scotland) SCO	Ray Farningham	13	1	3+5	0	0	0	0+3	0	2	1
	FW	(Scotland) SCO	Iain Ferguson	18	1	5+9	1	0	0	0+2	0	0+2	0
	FW	(Scotland) SCO	Jim Hamilton	19	6	12	1	0	0	4	5	3	0
	GK	(Scotland) SCO	Jamie Langfield	1	0	0	0	0	0	1	0	0	0
	MF	(Scotland) SCO	Kevin Magee	31	1	10+14	0	0+2	0	1+2	0	2	1
	GK	(Scotland) SCO	Gary McGlynn	12	0	11	0	1	0	0	0	0	0
	MF	(England) ENG	Gary McKeown	26	1	17+3	1	0+2	0	0+1	0	2+1	0
	DF	(Scotland) SCO	Tommy McQueen	23	1	15+1	0	2	0	3	0	2	1
	FW	(Scotland) SCO	Jerry O'Driscoll	24	11	18+3	10	1+2	1	0	0	0	0
	FW	(England) ENG	Lee Power	13	6	9+1	4	3	2	0	0	0	0
	MF	(Scotland) SCO	Gavin Rae	22	2	11+6	2	3	0	1	0	1	0
	DF	(Scotland) SCO	Robbie Raeside	44	5	34	4	3	0	4	1	3	0
	MF	(Scotland) SCO	Hugh Robertson	18	1	15	1	3	0	0	0	0	0
	FW	(Scotland) SCO	George Shaw	28	7	18+3	5	3	0	3	1	1	1
	FW	(Norway) NOR	Ole Petter Skonnord	4	0	1+3	0	0	0	0	0	0	0
	DF	(Scotland) SCO	Barry Smith	44	0	36	0	2	0	4	0	2	0
	GK	(Scotland) SCO	Billy Thomson	33	0	25	0	2	0	3	0	3	0
	FW	(Scotland) SCO	Paul Tosh	33	7	19+5	4	2+1	0	3	1	3	2
	DF	(Scotland) SCO	Craig Tully	25	0	16+5	0	2	0	1	0	0+1	0
	MF	(England) ENG	Mark Ward	1	0	1	0	0	0	0	0	0	0
	DF	(Scotland) SCO	David Winnie	31	1	26	1	1	0	2	0	2	0

== See also ==
- List of Dundee F.C. seasons
