= 1995 Scottish League Cup final =

- Event: 1995–96 Scottish League Cup
Aberdeen	Dundee
2	0
- Date: 26 November 1995
- Venue: Hampden Park, Glasgow
- Man of the Match: Stephen Glass
- Referee: Les Mottram
- Attendance: 33,099

The 1995 Scottish League Cup final was played on 26 November 1995, at Hampden Park in Glasgow and was the final of the 50th Scottish League Cup competition. The final was contested by Aberdeen and Dundee. Aberdeen won the match 2–0 thanks to goals by Billy Dodds and Duncan Shearer.

Due to redevelopment work at Hampden Park carried out in two stages during the decade, this was the only final to be played at the traditional venue between 1992 (the last with the old terracing on three sides) and 2000 (the first with the new south stand), both of which also featured Aberdeen.

== Match details ==
26 November 1995

Aberdeen	2 – 0	Dundee
Dodds 33'; Shearer 46'	Report

Hampden Park, Glasgow
Attendance: 33,099
Referee: Les Mottram

ABERDEEN:
GK	1	(Scotland) Michael Watt
DF	2	(Scotland) Stewart McKimmie (c)
DF	3	(Scotland) Stephen Glass
MF	4	(Scotland) Brian Grant
DF	5	(Scotland) John Inglis
DF	6	(Scotland) Gary Smith
MF	7	(Scotland) Joe Miller	(substituted off) 79'
FW	8	(Scotland) Duncan Shearer
MF	9	(Scotland) Paul Bernard
FW	10	(Scotland) Billy Dodds
MF	11	(Scotland) Eoin Jess	(substituted off) 85'
Substitutes:
MF	?	(Scotland) Peter Hetherston	(substituted on) 85'
MF	?	(Scotland) Hugh Robertson	(substituted on) 79'
GK	?	(Scotland) Derek Stillie
Manager:
(Scotland) Roy Aitken

DUNDEE:
GK	1	(France) Michel Pageaud
DF	2	(Scotland) Jim Duffy (c)
DF	3	(Scotland) Tommy McQueen
DF	4	(Scotland) Roddy Manley
MF	5	(Denmark) Morten Wieghorst
DF	6	(Scotland) Neil Duffy
MF	7	(Scotland) George Shaw
MF	8	(Slovakia) Dusan Vrto	(substituted off) 82'
FW	9	(Scotland) Paul Tosh	(substituted off) 61'
FW	10	(Scotland) Jim Hamilton
MF	11	(Scotland) Neil McCann	(substituted off) 69'
Substitutes:
MF	?	(Scotland) Ray Farningham	(substituted on) 82'
FW	?	(Scotland) Gerry Britton	(substituted on) 61'
MF	?	(Scotland) Iain Anderson	(substituted on) 69'
Manager:
(Scotland) Jim Duffy
