= Jim Hamilton (footballer, born 1976) =

Scottish footballer

Personal information
- Full name: James Hamilton
- Date of birth: 9 February 1976 (age 50)
- Place of birth: Aberdeen, Scotland
- Position: Striker

Youth career
- 1993–1994: Keith

Senior career*
Years	Team	Apps	(Gls)
1994–1996	Dundee	74	(27)
1996–1999	Heart of Midlothian	74	(25)
1999–2000	Aberdeen	14	(1)
2000–2003	Dundee United	70	(12)
2003	Dunfermline Athletic	2	(0)
2003–2004	Ross County	20	(5)
2004–2005	Livingston	21	(4)
2005–2006	Motherwell	51	(11)
2006–2008	Dunfermline Athletic	46	(5)
2008–2009	St Mirren	38	(4)
2009–2010	Partick Thistle	9	(0)
2010	Livingston	11	(2)
2010–2011	Arbroath	7	(0)
2011	East Fife	9	(1)
Total		446	(97)

International career
1995–1997	Scotland U21	14	(6)
- * Club domestic league appearances and goals as of 12 May 2011

James Hamilton (born 9 February 1976) is a Scottish retired footballer who played as a striker in a career that saw him appear for thirteen different league clubs, including Dundee, Heart of Midlothian, Aberdeen, Dundee United, Motherwell, Dunfermline Athletic and St Mirren in the top tier. Hamilton's only major honour in club football was winning the Scottish Cup with Hearts in 1998. He appeared for the Scotland under-21 team fourteen times, scoring six goals.

== Career ==
=== 1990s ===
Born in Aberdeen and a product of the Highland Football League, Hamilton began his senior career as a part-time player with Banffshire club Keith, before moving to Premier Division side Dundee in January 1994. He spent three years at Dens Park, during which time he established himself as a player to look out for in the future. He joined Heart of Midlothian in late 1996 and enjoyed a successful spell with them, scoring 33 goals in his two and a half years with the Edinburgh club and winning the Scottish Cup in 1998. He caught the attention of Aberdeen, and followed in the footsteps of his father (also named Jim Hamilton) when he signed for them in March 1999. Hamilton cost the Dons £300,000, however his time at Pittodrie was to prove less productive as he made few appearances and scored only one league goal.

=== 2000s ===
In January 2000, Dundee United signed him for £150,000, making them his fifth club to have played for. In November 2001, Hamilton became the first player in Scottish football to have a red card overturned after video evidence. In March 2003, Hamilton was told he could leave Tannadice, and due to transfer window restrictions, he surrendered his professional status to sign as an amateur for Dunfermline Athletic for the remainder of the season. Hamilton failed to win a full-time deal and signed for Scottish First Division side Ross County at the start of the 2003–04 season.

He made his return to the SPL in June 2004 when he signed for Livingston, becoming top scorer for 2004–05 with seven goals in fourteen starts for the Almondvale club. His career with Livingston was to prove short-lived, as Motherwell signed him in January and he only went on to score one goal for the Steelmen that season. The next season, he scored 11 goals in total, including the only goal in the 3–1 defeat to Celtic which won the SPL 'Goal of the Season' award, and later the SPL 'Goal of the Decade' Award.

On 29 August 2006, Hamilton re-signed for Dunfermline for an undisclosed fee, playing 34 games and scoring five goals before signing for SPL side St Mirren on 30 January 2008. After four months in Paisley, Hamilton signed a one-year contract extension.

He was released from his St Mirren contract at the end of the 2008–09 season, and signed for Partick Thistle on 9 July 2009 on a one-year contract. He scored his first goals for his new side when he scored twice in a 6–1 win at Forfar Athletic in the Scottish Challenge Cup second round. Hamilton was released by Partick Thistle in January 2010. After his release, Hamilton returned to Livingston, signing a short-term deal with the Almondvale side before being released at the end of the season.

=== 2010s ===
Into his third decade as a professional footballer, Hamilton joined Arbroath in July 2010 on a one-year deal but moved to East Fife the following January. In 2011, he began working with Total.

== International career ==
Hamilton played 14 times for the Scotland under-21 side, 11 of those selections while playing for Dundee, making him the club's most capped player at that level.

== Personal life ==
In addition to his father Jim who also played for Aberdeen and Dunfermline as well as East Fife, his son Robbie is an aspiring footballer who plays as a defender and signed a first professional contract with Hibernian in January 2021.

== Career statistics ==
Appearances and goals by club, season and competition
Club	Season	League			Scottish Cup		League Cup		Europe		Other		Total	
Club	Season	Division	Apps	Goals	Apps	Goals	Apps	Goals	Apps	Goals	Apps	Goals	Apps	Goals
Dundee	1993–94	Scottish Premier Division	1	0	0	0	0	0	—		—		1	0
Dundee	1994–95	Scottish First Division	28	12	2	1	0	0	—		4 (Note: Appearance(s) in Scottish Challenge Cup)	0	34	13
Dundee	1995–96	Scottish First Division	33	14	1	0	3	2	—		3	3	40	19
Dundee	1996–97	Scottish First Division	12	1	—		4	5	—		3	1	19	7
Dundee	Total		74	27	3	1	7	7	0	0	10	4	94	39
Heart of Midlothian	1996–97	Scottish Premier Division	17	5	3	1	—		—		—		20	6
Heart of Midlothian	1997–98	Scottish Premier Division	32	14	5	1	3	0	—		—		40	15
Heart of Midlothian	1998–99	Scottish Premier League	25	6	1	1	3	1	4 (Note: Appearance(s) in UEFA Cup Winners' Cup)	2	—		33	10
Heart of Midlothian	Total		74	25	9	3	6	1	4	2	0	0	93	31
Aberdeen	1998–99	Scottish Premier League	7	1	—		—		—		—		7	1
Aberdeen	1999–2000	Scottish Premier League	7	0	—		1	0	—		—		8	0
Aberdeen	Total		14	1	0	0	1	0	0	0	0	0	15	1
Dundee United	1999–2000	Scottish Premier League	13	1	3	3	—		—		—		16	4
Dundee United	2000–01	Scottish Premier League	20	2	3	0	1	0	—		—		24	2
Dundee United	2001–02	Scottish Premier League	24	5	1	0	3	1	—		—		28	6
Dundee United	2002–03	Scottish Premier League	13	4	1	1	2	0	—		—		16	5
Dundee United	Total		70	12	8	4	6	1	0	0	0	0	84	17
Dunfermline Athletic	2002–03	Scottish Premier League	2	0	—		—		—		—		2	0
Ross County	2003–04	Scottish First Division	20	5	—		2	0	—		2	2	24	7
Livingston	2004–05	Scottish Premier League	21	4	1	0	3	3	—		—		25	7
Motherwell	2004–05	Scottish Premier League	14	1	—		—		—		—		14	1
Motherwell	2005–06	Scottish Premier League	34	10	1	0	3	1	—		—		38	11
Motherwell	2006–07	Scottish Premier League	3	0	—		0	0	—		—		3	0
Motherwell	Total		51	11	1	0	3	1	0	0	0	0	55	12
Dunfermline Athletic	2006–07	Scottish Premier League	25	2	4	1	1	0	—		—		30	3
Dunfermline Athletic	2007–08	Scottish First Division	21	3	1	0	1	0	2 (Note: Appearance(s) in UEFA Cup)	1	2	0	27	4
Dunfermline Athletic	Total		46	5	5	1	2	0	2	1	2	0	57	7
St Mirren	2007–08	Scottish Premier League	15	1	—		—		—		—		15	1
St Mirren	2008–09	Scottish Premier League	23	3	3	2	2	0	—		—		28	5
St Mirren	Total		38	4	3	2	2	0	0	0	0	0	43	6
Partick Thistle	2009–10	Scottish First Division	9	0	0	0	2	0	—		2	2	13	2
Livingston	2009–10	Scottish Third Division	11	2	0	0	0	0	—		0	0	11	2
Arbroath	2010–11	Scottish Third Division	7	0	0	0	0	0	—		0	0	7	0
East Fife	2010–11	Scottish Second Division	9	1	0	0	0	0	—		0	0	9	1
Career total			446	97	30	11	34	13	6	3	16	8	532	132

== Honours ==
Dundee

- Scottish Challenge Cup: runner-up 1994–95
- Scottish League Cup: runner-up 1995–96

Heart of Midlothian

- Scottish Cup: winner 1997–98

Dunfermline Athletic

  - Scottish Cup: runner-up 2006–07
