= Mark McWalter =

Scottish footballer

Personal information
- Full name: Mark McWalter
- Date of birth: 20 June 1968 (age 58)
- Place of birth: Arbroath, Scotland
- Position: Forward

Youth career
- Arbroath Lads Club

Senior career*
Years	Team	Apps	(Gls)
1984–1987	Arbroath	70	(20)
1987–1991	St Mirren	80	(8)
1991–1993	Partick Thistle	19	(0)
1993–1995	Coleraine	35	(17)
1995–1996	Ballymena United	20	(8)
1996–1999	Arbroath	59	(9)
1999–2004	Arbroath Victoria	?	(?)
- * Club domestic league appearances and goals

Mark McWalter (born 20 June 1968, in Arbroath) is a Scottish former football striker.

McWalter began his career with his local club Arbroath where as a teenager he became a first team regular. His form attracted the attentions of top-flight St Mirren, who signed him in June 1987. In and out of the team at Love Street, he joined Partick Thistle in June 1991 in a swap deal that saw he and George Shaw exchanged for Chic Charnley and David Elliot. McWalter's spell at Partick was an unhappy one however as he failed to score.

After being released by Partick McWalter moved to the Irish Football League with Coleraine and became a 'cult hero' at the club. He was linked with the manager's job after the departure of Felix Healy in 1994 but lost out to Kenny Shiels, a manager with whom he would later clash, resulting in McWalter moving to Ballymena United for a year. He was the club's top scorer in his sole season.

McWalter returned to Scotland in 1996 to play three final seasons back at Gayfield Park. Unable to cope with the rigours of full-time football due a persistent knee injury McWalter left full-time football to carry on playing in the juniors with Arbroath Victoria. He spent five seasons with the club, including two as player-manager before retiring and leaving football completely. Having retired he became a youth worker, running a project from Arbroath's old supporters' club.
