= Neil Duffy (footballer, born 1937) =

Scottish footballer

Personal information
- Full name: Cornelius McQuade Duffy
- Date of birth: 7 March 1937
- Place of birth: Glasgow, Scotland
- Date of death: 17 June 2013 (aged 75–76)
- Place of death: Glasgow, Scotland
- Height: 5 ft 6 in (1.68 m)
- Position: Inside left

Senior career*
Years	Team	Apps	(Gls)
–	Ashfield		
1957	→ Hamilton Academical (trial)	1	(0)
1958–1960	East Stirlingshire		
1960–1964	Partick Thistle	134	(55)
1964–1967	St Johnstone	59	(22)

International career
1964	SFL trial v SFA	1	(0)
- * Club domestic league appearances and goals

Cornelius McQuade Duffy (7 March 1937 – 17 June 2013) was a Scottish footballer who played as an inside left. His most prominent spell was with Partick Thistle, and he was inducted into their 'Hall of Fame' in 2009.

== Career ==
Duffy began his career in the SJFA with north Glasgow team Ashfield alongside future European Cup winner Stevie Chalmers, who stated in his autobiography that he felt Duffy was the more skilled of the pair of them. Both were selected for the Scotland team at that level before stepping up to senior football.

Other than a single Scottish Football League appearance on trial for Hamilton Academical, his first senior club was East Stirlingshire, followed by five years at Partick Thistle, during which the club made a challenge for the Scottish League title in the 1962–63 season, but lost form after delays caused by a very harsh winter. In late 1964 he moved on to St Johnstone in a swap deal involving Dan McLindon, resuming a playing partnership with Gordon Whitelaw.

Duffy then immigrated to South Africa where continued to be involved in football as a player and a coach. His son, also named Neil Duffy, likewise became a footballer, growing up in South Africa and initially playing there before establishing himself in the Scottish leagues.
