= Dan McLindon =

Scottish footballer and manager

Dan McLindon (born 3 March 1940) is a Scottish former football player and manager. McLindon was signed by Dunfermline, then managed by Jock Stein, from junior club Bellshill in 1960. McLindon was part of the Dunfermline team that won the 1961 Scottish Cup Final. He moved to St Johnstone in 1964, in exchange for Alex Ferguson. Later that year he was again exchanged, to Partick Thistle, for Neil Duffy. Thistle were relegated in 1970, after which McLindon left the club.

McLindon then became player/manager of Stranraer for a year. McLindon then moved to East Stirlingshire as a player. McLindon then became a coach and manager, working for Alloa, Cowdenbeath, East Stirlingshire, Airdrie, Motherwell and Partick Thistle.
