= Lee Power =

Footballer (born 1972)

Personal information
- Full name: Lee Michael Power
- Date of birth: 30 June 1972 (age 54)
- Place of birth: Lewisham, London, England
- Position: Forward

Youth career
- –1990: Norwich City

Senior career*
Years	Team	Apps	(Gls)
1990–1994	Norwich City	44	(10)
1992	→ Charlton Athletic (loan)	5	(0)
1993	→ Sunderland (loan)	3	(0)
1993	→ Portsmouth (loan)	2	(0)
1994–1995	Bradford City	30	(5)
1995	→ Millwall (loan)	0	(0)
1995–1996	Peterborough United	38	(6)
1996–1997	Dundee	10	(4)
1997–1998	Hibernian	11	(2)
1998	Ayr United	4	(0)
1998	Plymouth Argyle	16	(0)
1998–1999	Halifax Town	25	(5)
1999–2001	Boston United	19	(5)
Total		163	(27)

International career
1990–1993	Republic of Ireland U21	13	(2)
1992	Republic of Ireland B	1	(0)

Managerial career
- 2006: Cambridge United
- 2015: Swindon Town (caretaker)
- * Club domestic league appearances and goals

Lee Michael Power (born 30 June 1972) is a former professional footballer and former chairman of Swindon Town. Born in England, his Irish ancestry allowed him to be capped by Republic of Ireland at youth, U21 and B levels. Power played in three qualifiers in the 1990 UEFA European Under-18 Football Championship qualifying campaign and in the 1990 UEFA European Under-18 Football Championship as well as the 1991 FIFA World Youth Championship.

== Playing career ==
Power was born in Lewisham, London. He began his career as a trainee with Norwich City, making his first-team debut against Aston Villa in April 1990, before turning professional in June the same year. His initial form was good enough to earn a call-up to the Republic of Ireland Under-21 side and he went on to make a then record number of appearances (13) for them.

Despite a promising start to his Norwich career, Power struggled to maintain a regular place in the first team, particularly with competition from the likes of Chris Sutton and Efan Ekoku. He requested a transfer and moved to Charlton Athletic on loan in December 1992. Further loan spells with Sunderland (in August 1993) and Portsmouth (in October 1993) followed before a £200,000 move to Bradford City in March 1994.

He scored on his Bradford debut, a 2–1 win at home to Swansea City on 12 March 1994, but his progress was impeded by a virus that threatened his career.

In July 1995 he moved to Peterborough United for a fee of £80,000, subsequently moving to Scottish League side Dundee in December 1996. He scored twice on his Dundee debut, a 6–0 victory over East Fife, and his form soon attracted the attention of other clubs.

After Dundee's manager Jim Duffy moved to Hibernian he signed Power and his teammate Paul Tosh for a combined fee of £200,000 in March 1997. Power was a Hibs regular for the remainder of the 1996–97 season, but lost his place when Alex McLeish took over as manager and was allowed to join Ayr United on a free transfer in March 1998 until the end of the season.

In July 1998, Power had a trial with Carlisle United, playing in a friendly against Rangers, but joined Plymouth Argyle later that month. He struggled to settle at Plymouth and in December 1998 joined Halifax Town on loan, the move becoming permanent in January 1999.

His final footballing move, on the playing side, came in November 1999 when he joined Southern League side Boston United for a fee of £25,000. He also coached Boston, but left in January 2001. His early retirement from football came at the relatively early age of 28, though was not entirely surprising after two broken legs.

== Post-playing career ==
Power worked as a football agent before joining forces with Danny Lake and setting up the sports publishing company CRE8. Power is also a racehorse owner.

In May 2003, Power was part of a consortium that aimed to take over Luton Town. The proposed move was not well received by Luton fans, particularly as it involved sacking the popular manager Joe Kinnear.

He subsequently joined the board at Cambridge United and took over as chairman of the-then Conference National side in August 2006. In September 2006 he acted as caretaker manager following the dismissal of manager Rob Newman and his assistant Tony Spearing. On 22 January 2008, on the same night that Cambridge United beat Droylsden 5–0, Power resigned as chairman of the club, citing personal differences with fellow board members as the chief reason. In April 2008, Power joined the board of Cambridge's Conference rivals Rushden and Diamonds.

=== Swindon Town ===
Power joined the board of directors at Swindon Town and took an ownership stake in the club in April 2013. He invested £1.2 million in the club, which enabled a transfer embargo to be lifted. Power took full control of Swindon Town in December 2013. On 18 October 2015, Power took 'temporary' control over Swindon's first-team affairs following Mark Cooper's departure from the club. In 2020, the COVID-19 pandemic created financial difficulties for the club. Power warned of potential bankruptcy in February 2021, and, in April 2021, was charged with breaching FA regulations concerning the club's ownership and/or funding.

On 30 June 2021, the Official Supporters Club was told that a deal to transfer Power's ownership to Australian businessman Clem Morfuni's Axis would be completed "in the next couple of weeks", though the club later complained that Axis was delaying payment. In early July 2021, it emerged that the club's 11 contracted players plus backroom staff had not received their June wages, and that the County Ground's owner, Swindon Borough Council, was taking legal action after receiving no rent since April 2020.

=== Waterford F.C. ===
In November 2016 Power agreed a deal to become owner and chairman of Irish club Waterford United. He said there were a number of reasons behind the deal, claiming that the facilities in Waterford were Premier League standard and better than Swindon's. Power also said he was attracted by the club's highly successful youth system. In addition, Power had family from Waterford, his Irish descent having enabled him to play for the Republic of Ireland at international level, so the deal was, in his words, "a no-brainer". He went on to appoint Pat Fenlon as director of football and Alan Reynolds as head coach for the 2017 season. He also changed the club's crest and changed the club's name back to its original identity of Waterford FC. On 4 June 2021, it was announced that Power had sold the club to R&S Holdings Ltd, fronted by UK entrepreneur Richard Forrest who had bought the remaining stakes in the club having previously bought 33% earlier in the year.
