= Dragutin Ristić =

Croatian footballer (born 1964)

Dragan Ristić
Personal information
- Full name: Dragutin Ristić
- Date of birth: 5 August 1964 (age 62)
- Place of birth: Pula, SFR Yugoslavia
- Height: 1.83 m (6 ft 0 in)
- Position: Striker

Senior career*
Years	Team	Apps	(Gls)
1984	Istra Pula		
1985	Obilić		
1985	Partizan	0	(0)
1986–1990	Acri	105	(43)
1989	Crotone	2	(1)
1990–1991	Matera	33	(23)
1991–1992	Virtus Chianciano Terme	28	(8)
1992–1993	Benevento	31	(20)
1993–1994	Dundee	18	(6)
1994	Falkirk	12	(4)
1994–1995	Dundee United	10	(2)
1995–1996	Tirsense	11	(4)
1996–1997	Castrovillari	13	(2)
1997	ÍA	10	(3)
1997	Narnese	10	(1)
1998–1999	Sestrese	20	(3)
1999	Rende	13	(6)
1999–2000	Campobasso	15	(5)
2000–2001	Brindisi 1912	30	(8)
2001–2002	Ravenna	32	(21)
2002–2003	Suzzara	30	(10)
2003–2004	Virtus Pavullese	10	(3)

Managerial career
- 2012: Kras Repen
- 2017-2018: Istra Pula
- NK Medulin 1921
- * Club domestic league appearances and goals

Dragutin Ristić (born 5 August 1964) is a Croatian former footballer who played as a striker, currently coach of NK Medulin 1921.

== Career ==
=== Player ===
He spent most of his career playing for lower division clubs in Italy, and also played in Scotland, Portugal and Iceland. He was the first Croatian footballer to play in the Scottish Premier League.

=== Coach ===
On 30 October 2012 he was named new coach of Kras in Serie D.
