= David Elliot (footballer) =

Scottish footballer

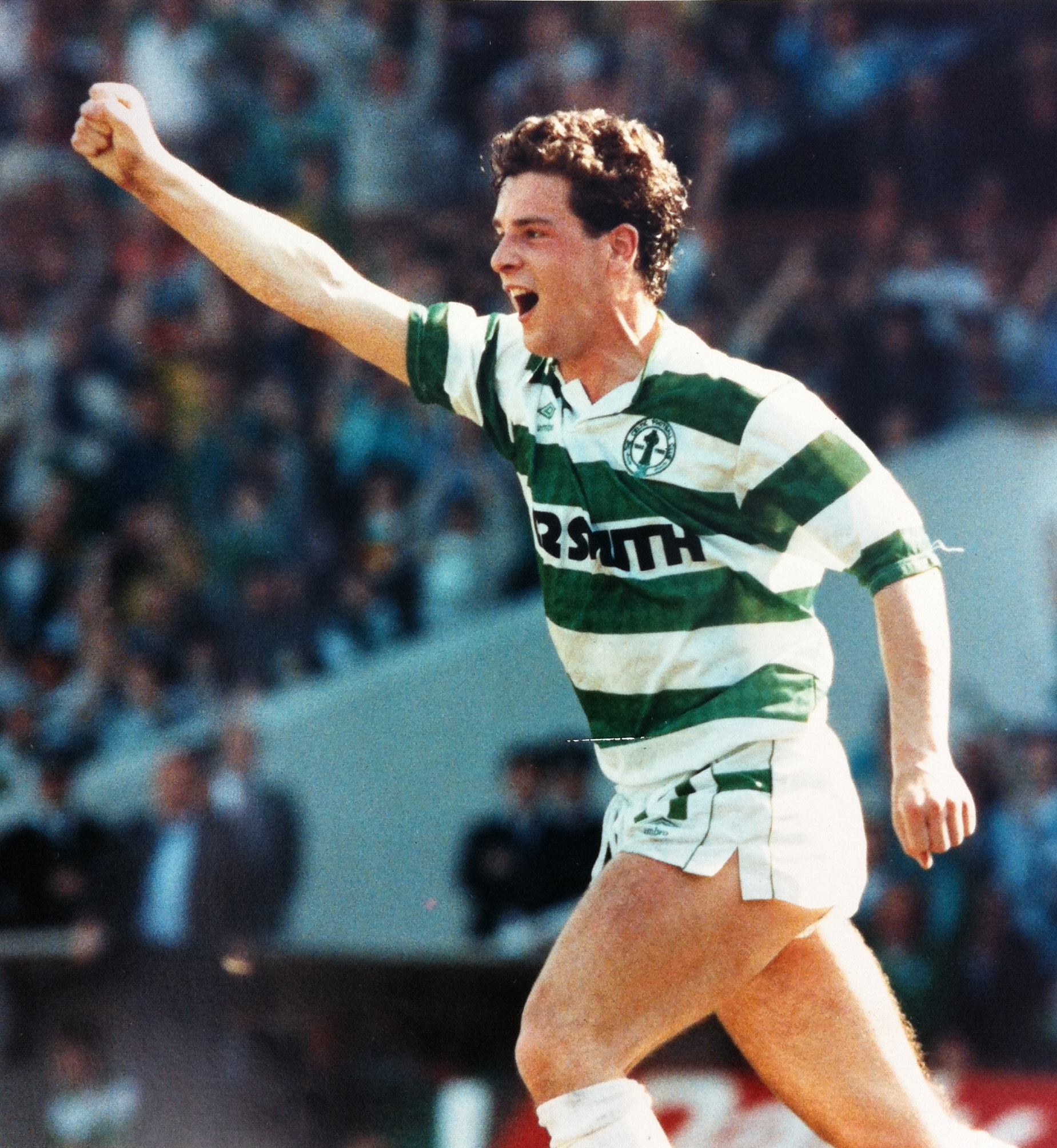
- Elliot playing for Celtic.

Personal information
- Date of birth: 13 November 1969 (age 56)
- Place of birth: Glasgow, Scotland
- Height: 5 ft 9 in (1.75 m)
- Positions: Left back; left winger

Youth career
- Celtic Boys Club
- 1987–1989: Celtic

Senior career*
Years	Team	Apps	(Gls)
1989–1990	Celtic	6	(0)
1990–1991	Partick Thistle	37	(13)
1991–1995	St Mirren	132	(17)
1995–1997	Falkirk	49	(1)
1997–1999	Hibernian	19	(0)
1999–2000	Partick Thistle	11	(2)
Total		254	(33)
- * Club domestic league appearances and goals

David Elliot (born 13 November 1969 in Glasgow) is a Scottish former footballer who played for Celtic, Partick Thistle, St Mirren, Falkirk and Hibernian.

== Career ==
Early in his career, Elliot was a pacy winger who could also score goals. He gained his football education at Celtic Boys Club where he was coached by Celtic legends Davie Provan, Bobby Murdoch and Jimmy Johnstone after which he signed for his boyhood heroes in 1987. He managed six first team appearances in the 1988–89 season, making his debut at the age of just 19 years old.

Elliot then moved to Partick Thistle where he finished top scorer in season 1990–91, scoring 13 times in his 37 league appearances. He was also voted by his fellow professionals as their Player of the Year and nominated as 1st Division Player of the Year that season. He then moved on to St Mirren along with his good friend Chic Charnley where he played in a more attacking full back role before moving to Falkirk and then Hibernian.

Recurring injury problems caught up with Elliot later in his career limiting his appearances but he returned to Partick Thistle before retiring. He later became a police officer.
