= Roddy Manley =

Scottish footballer

Personal information
- Date of birth: 23 July 1965 (age 61)
- Place of birth: Glasgow, Scotland
- Position: Defender

Senior career*
Years	Team	Apps	(Gls)
1984–1989	Falkirk	159	(2)
1989–1993	St Mirren	100	(0)
1993–1995	Instant-Dict		
1995–1996	Dundee	17	(0)
- * Club domestic league appearances and goals

Roddy Manley (born 23 July 1965) is a Scottish former footballer. He mainly played in defence for Falkirk, St Mirren, Instant-Dict and Dundee.
