= George Shaw (footballer, born 1969) =

Scottish footballer and manager

Personal information
- Date of birth: 10 February 1969 (age 57)
- Place of birth: Glasgow, Scotland
- Position: Forward

Youth career
- Ayresome North

Senior career*
Years	Team	Apps	(Gls)
1987–1991	St Mirren	68	(4)
1991–1993	Partick Thistle	91	(21)
1993–1997	Dundee	108	(34)
1997–1999	Dunfermline Athletic	41	(4)
1999–2000	Ross County	38	(14)
2000–2001	Partick Thistle	13	(3)
2001	Clydebank	1	(0)
2001–2002	Stranraer	29	(4)
2002–2003	Forfar Athletic	13	(0)
2003–2004	Arbroath	1	(0)
2004	Shettleston		
Total		403	(84)

Managerial career
- 2006–2007: Forfar Athletic
- 2016: Cumbernauld United
- * Club domestic league appearances and goals

George Shaw (born 10 February 1969) is a Scottish former football player who last managed Cumbernauld United in the Scottish Junior Football Association, West Region. He played in the Scottish Football League Premier Division for four clubs.

== Career ==
Shaw began his career with St Mirren but left the club in June 1991 for Partick Thistle when he and Mark McWalter were exchanged for Chic Charnley and David Elliot. He joined Dundee along with fellow Thistle player Gerry Britton in January 1994 for a combined fee of £250,000, but the club were relegated to the First Division at the end of the season. After three years in the second tier, which also included a Scottish League Cup final defeat to Aberdeen in 1995, Shaw returned to the Premier Division in 1997 with Dunfermline Athletic. He later had spells at Ross County, Partick Thistle for a second time, Clydebank, Stranraer, Forfar Athletic and Arbroath before dropping out of the Scottish Football League to play for Junior sides Shettleston and Cumbernauld United.

Shaw returned to Forfar Athletic under manager Ray Farningham, initially serving as his assistant before succeeding him in the role. The team struggled, ultimately finishing bottom of the Second Division although Shaw was sacked in March before the season had ended.

Shaw was playing for and managing amateur team Kilsyth United AFC, and also scouting opponents for Partick Thistle, before joining Craig Tully's management team at East Stirlingshire in the summer of 2014. With Tully sacked after Shire's relegation to the Lowland Football League in 2016, Shaw joined the coaching team at Cumbernauld United as assistant to John Queen that summer and following Queen's resignation in September, was appointed manager after a short interim period in charge.

Shaw was sacked following heavy losses to Kilsyth and Shotts Bon Accord.
