= Chic Charnley =

Scottish footballer

Personal information
- Full name: James Callaghan Charnley
- Date of birth: 11 June 1963 (age 63)
- Place of birth: Glasgow, Scotland
- Position: Midfielder

Youth career
- Possil Villa
- 1981–1982: Rutherglen Glencairn

Senior career*
Years	Team	Apps	(Gls)
1982–1983	St Mirren	1	(0)
1983–1984	Ayr United	17	(3)
1984–1987	Pollok	8	(2)
1987–1988	Clydebank	31	(11)
1988	Hamilton Academical	14	(0)
1988–1991	Partick Thistle	73	(22)
1991–1992	St Mirren	42	(5)
1992	→ Bolton Wanderers (loan)	3	(0)
1992–1993	Djurgårdens IF	12	(3)
1993–1995	Partick Thistle	46	(2)
1995	Cork City	3	(0)
1995–1996	Dumbarton	18	(1)
1996–1997	Dundee	27	(6)
1997–1998	Hibernian	29	(4)
1998	Clydebank (trial)	1	(0)
1998	Partick Thistle	5	(0)
1998	Tarff Rovers	5	(0)
1998–1999	Portadown	13	(0)
1999–2002	Kirkintilloch Rob Roy	0	(0)
2002–2003	Partick Thistle	2	(0)
Total		350	(59)

Managerial career
- 2003–2004: Partick Thistle (coach)
- 2011–2014: Clyde (assistant)
- * Club domestic league appearances and goals

James Callaghan "Chic" Charnley (born 11 June 1963) is a Scottish former football player and coach. Charnley's playing career lasted nearly 20 years, with spells at Hamilton Academical, St Mirren, Hibernian and Dundee, however he is perhaps best known for his numerous spells at Partick Thistle. He also was a coach at Thistle for a short time and was briefly assistant manager of Clyde. Throughout his career, Charnley had a reputation as being a hot-head; he was sent off 17 times in a senior career which lasted for nearly 20 years.

== Club career ==
Charnley played for a number of clubs, including Ayr United, Clydebank, Hamilton Accies, Partick Thistle, St Mirren, Bolton (on loan), Djurgårdens IF, Dumbarton, Dundee, Hibernian and Cork City.

He also played for Junior clubs Rutherglen Glencairn, Pollok, Tarff Rovers and Kirkintilloch Rob Roy.

Charnley acquired his nickname in his youth when he would sell poultry door-to-door in the Possilpark district of northern Glasgow, where he was brought up as a supporter of Celtic. In 1994, he had a trial for Celtic playing one game for them in a friendly against Manchester Utd at Old Trafford. Many rated him as the best player in the game and it was rumoured that he had done enough to win a contract. However, Celtic's manager Lou Macari was sacked not long after this friendly game and rumours of a move to Celtic came to nothing.

=== Partick Thistle ===
As a player, he is best remembered for his time at Partick Thistle. He played for the club on a few different occasions and is considered something of a cult hero at Firhill, as well as a member of their Hall of Fame. He initially left Partick for St Mirren in June 1991 in a swap deal that saw he and David Elliot exchange for Mark McWalter and George Shaw.

Charnley was an inconsistent performer with displays ranging from poor to outstanding and occasional outbursts of indiscipline and violence. At many points in his career, it seemed that top-flight football was beyond him. He was freed by Partick Thistle when the Glasgow club was in the Premier Division.

During his time at Thistle, he and two other players were approached by two teenage boys during a training session in a Glasgow Park. Despite suffering a stab wound to his hand when one of the boys brandished a Samurai sword, Charnley was able to disable his attacker with a punch.

=== Hibernian ===
He made his Hibernian debut in August 1997 against Celtic, where late on in the second half he latched on to a misplaced pass from fellow debutant Henrik Larsson and struck the winning goal from 25 yards. During his first few months at Hibs, many called for his inclusion in the Scotland squad, though this did not materialise. Despite a good start to the league campaign, Hibs' form soon faltered and they ended up being relegated at the end of the season. By this stage Alex McLeish had already replaced Jim Duffy as manager at Hibernian, and had dropped Charnley from the side.

=== Back to Thistle ===
His final season as a player was with Partick Thistle in the 2002–03 Scottish Premier League season. Chic was approaching the age of 40, and made just two more appearances for Thistle after their promotion. His final match was perhaps fittingly against Hibernian at Easter Road. He came on as a substitute in a 3–2 victory for Thistle.

== Coaching career ==
The next season (2003–04) he was appointed coach at Thistle under manager Gerry Collins, but when Collins was sacked by the Thistle board he resigned in protest at their decision.

Chic returned to Firhill during the 2006/2007 pre-season for ex-teammate Kenny Arthur's testimonial match versus a Celtic XI. With the game in injury time and Thistle losing 2–1, Chic rifled home a 25-yard strike to draw level. Charnley was appointed assistant manager of Clyde in February 2011 by Jim Duffy.

== Honours ==
St Mirren

- Renfrewshire Cup: 1982–83

Partick Thistle

- Glasgow Cup: 1988–89

Portadown

- Irish Cup: 1998–99
