= Paul Mathers =

Scottish footballer and coach

Personal information
- Full name: Paul Andrew Mathers
- Date of birth: 17 January 1970 (age 56)
- Place of birth: Aberdeen, Scotland
- Position: Goalkeeper

Team information
- Current team: Dundee United (goalkeeping coach)

Senior career*
Years	Team	Apps	(Gls)
1986-1996	Dundee	132	(0)
1996-1999	Falkirk	91	(0)
1999-2001	Linfield	63	(0)
2001–2002	Dundee	0	(0)
2001–2002	→ Peterhead (loan)	10	(0)
2002	→ Berwick Rangers (loan)	6	(0)
2002–2006	Peterhead	164	(0)
2006–2007	Greenock Morton	24	(0)
2007	East Fife	0	(0)
2007–2015	St Mirren	0	(0)
Total		490	(0)
- * Club domestic league appearances and goals

Paul Mathers (born 17 January 1970) is a Scottish professional footballer and coach. He is currently the goalkeeping coach at Scottish Premiership side Dundee United, appointed in July 2023.

== Career ==
Between 1986 and 1996, Mathers made 132 appearances for Dundee, before moving to Falkirk, where he played 91 times in three years. In 1999, he moved to Linfield, making 63 appearances until a transfer back to Dundee in 2001. In his second stint at Dundee, which lasted for only one season, Mathers did not make a league appearance and was loaned out twice. He moved on in 2002 to Peterhead, where he made 164 league appearances.

Mathers signed with St Mirren in 2007. He did not make a first team appearance for St Mirren as he was employed primarily as a goalkeeping coach, but he continued to hold a playing registration. Mathers was an unused substitute for a 2-2 SPL draw at Inverness Caledonian Thistle on 29 March 2014, aged 44.

He moved to a coaching position with the Rangers academy on 6 August 2015. Later in August 2015, Mathers moved to a first team coaching position at St Johnstone.

== Honours ==
Dundee 1st division championship winners 1991/92

Falkirk

- Scottish Challenge Cup (1): 1997

Linfield

- Irish Premier League (2): Champions 1999/2000, 2000/2001
- Irish League Cup (1): Winners 2000/2001

Greenock Morton

- Scottish 2nd Division (1): Champions 2006/2007
