= Craig Tully =

Scottish footballer and manager (born 1976)

Personal information
- Date of birth: 7 January 1976 (age 50)
- Place of birth: Stirling, Scotland
- Height: 1.80 m (5 ft 11 in)
- Position: Defender

Team information
- Current team: Falkirk Women (manager)

Youth career
- Victoria Juveniles

Senior career*
Years	Team	Apps	(Gls)
1994–1999	Dundee	39	(0)
1999	→ Forfar Athletic (loan)	6	(1)
1999–2000	Ross County	21	(0)
2000–2001	Forfar Athletic	9	(0)
2001–2003	Elgin City	83	(6)
2003	Stenhousemuir	7	(0)
2003–2004	Elgin City	17	(5)
2004–2007	Peterhead	89	(10)
2007–2008	Arbroath	23	(0)
2008–2011	East Stirlingshire	60	(1)
2011	Clyde	0	(0)
2011–2014	Peterhead	0	(0)
Total		354	(25)

Managerial career
- 2014–2016: East Stirlingshire
- 2017–????: Hawick Royal Albert
- 2022–: Falkirk Women
- * Club domestic league appearances and goals

Craig Tully (born 7 January 1976) is a Scottish football coach and former professional player who is manager of Falkirk Women.

== Career ==
=== Playing career ===
Born in Stirling, Tully played as a defender for Victoria Juveniles, Dundee, Forfar Athletic, Ross County, Elgin City, Stenhousemuir, Peterhead, Arbroath, East Stirlingshire and Clyde.

=== Coaching career ===
After working as a player-coach for Peterhead, Tully was appointed manager of East Stirlingshire in April 2014.

The Shire were relegated in his second season in charge through the Scottish League Two play-offs in May 2016. Shortly after their relegation, Tully left Ochilview Park after his contract was not renewed. Tully was appointed manager of Lowland League club Hawick Royal Albert in September 2017, suffering relegation to the East of Scotland Football League in his first season with the club.

In July 2022, Falkirk Women appointed Tully as Head Coach.

=== Managerial statistics ===
As of match played 14 May 2016

Team	Nat	From	To	Record				
Team	Nat	From	To	G	W	D	L	Win %
East Stirlingshire	(Scotland)	June 2014	May 2016	80	23	10	47	28.75
