= Forfar Athletic F.C. =

Association football club in Scotland

Forfar Athletic
- Full name: Forfar Athletic Football Club
- Nicknames: The Loons; Sky Blues
- Founded: 1885; 141 years ago
- Ground: Station Park, Forfar
- Capacity: 6,777 (739 seated)
- Coordinates: 56.652187°N 2.884996°W
- Chairman: Vacant
- Manager: Jim Weir
- League: Scottish League Two
- 2025–26: Scottish League Two, 4th of 10
- Website: www.forfarathletic.co.uk
Home colours	Away colours

Forfar Athletic Football Club are a Scottish semi-professional football club from the town of Forfar, Angus. They are members of the Scottish Professional Football League and currently play in Scottish League Two. They play their home games at Station Park, in the north end of Forfar.

The club are nicknamed "the Loons" ('loon' is a Northern Scots word for a young man), although they are sometimes referred to as the "Sky Blues", which along with navy blue is one of the club colours. One explanation for the origins of the Loons' moniker is that the second string were younger than the first team, so over time people would say "I'm off to watch the Loons".

Forfar share many local rivals in Angus, including Arbroath, Brechin City and Montrose, as well as the larger clubs of Dundee, Dundee United, St Johnstone and Aberdeen in the wider east of Scotland region. As well as taking part in the Scottish Professional Football League, the club also participate in the Scottish Cup, the League Cup, the Challenge Cup and the Forfarshire Cup every season.

== History ==
=== Origins ===
The club was founded in 1885 when the second team of the older Forfar club, Angus F.C. broke away to form Forfar Athletic. Angus FC had been the town's senior club for a number of years, and on 24 September 1883, amalgamated with the Junior club Forfar West End, which became the 2nd XI, taking the name Angus Athletic.

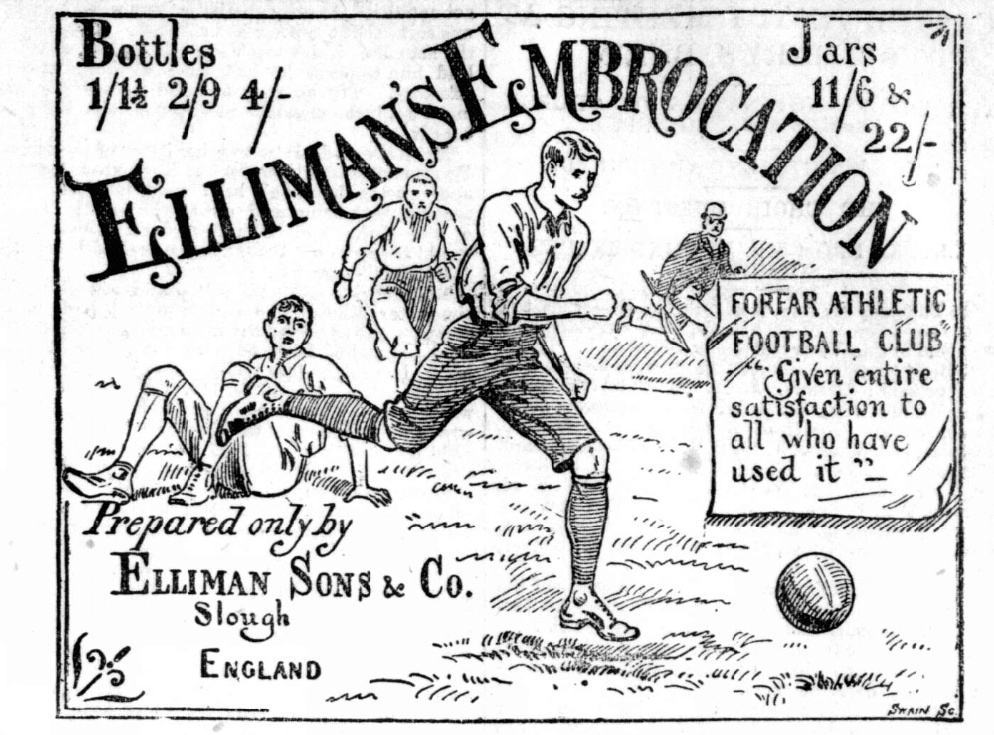
Forfar Athletic endorse Ellimans Embrocation.

The success of Angus Athletic in junior cup competitions and against other senior sides prompted the second string to go it alone, and in May 1885 it started playing as Forfar Athletic. Forfar played its first match on 16 May 1885 when it defeated Dundee Our Boys 1–0.

The new club originally played in a strip of black and white one-inch hooped jerseys with blue knickers, changing to blue and black vertical stripes (imitating the old Angus colours) in 1889. The key match shifting the balance of power was a 3–1 win over Angus in the first round of the 1885–86 Scottish Cup; Angus was dissolved shortly afterwards.

On 1 September 1888 the club recorded their record win when they defeated Lindertis, a side from nearby Kirriemuir, 14–1.

=== Into the League ===
The club were admitted into the Scottish Football League in the 1921–22 season, entering the new Second Division, finishing 14th out of 20 teams in their first season. In the 1923–24 season a third division was established, Forfar were relegated into that division in the 1924–25 season by finishing bottom of Division Two. The club were lucky; 12 of the 16 teams in that division were relegated as the division was to be scrapped the following season; Forfar however managed to gain promotion. National competitions were suspended with the outbreak of the Second World War in 1939. In this period Alex Troup was a key player for the club – he went on to play for Dundee and Everton. The club's biggest defeat also came in this period, on 2 January 1930, when they lost 2–12 to King's Park.

=== Post-war highs and lows ===
When the league resumed in the 1946–47 season Forfar found themselves in the C Division (a reconstituted Third Division) of the league. Promotion to the B Division was won in the 1948–49 season and the club remained in the B division and its successor Second Division until finally winning the divisional championship in the 1983–84 under manager Doug Houston. This was considerable progress from the 1973–74 season when the club finished bottom of the division. The late 1970s and the 1980s can probably be considered the club's most successful period – at the end of the 1985–86 season the club were just one point below promotion to the Premier Division.

This era also saw a succession of good cup runs, meeting Rangers in the League Cup semi-finals in 1977–78 (losing 5–2 after extra time) and again in the Scottish Cup semi-finals at Hampden Park in the 1981–82 competition, forcing a 0–0 draw in the first game and earning a replay which ended 3–1 to Rangers. In the 1986–87 Scottish Cup the club came within a few seconds of knocking Dundee United, then flying high after beating FC Barcelona at the Nou Camp, out of the cup in the quarter-finals, but United scored to gain a replay, which they subsequently won.

Various kit colours were used throughout this period. In the 1950s and early 1960s, a green home strip was used. Later the team adopted lighter blue with varying navy. The nickname "The Sky Blues" was introduced in the 1982–83 season to aid marketing, however it sometimes became confused with the nickname of English club Coventry City. The nickname was dropped by the club during the early 1990s, It is however still sometimes used by the media.

=== Hegarty, Campbell & McPhee (1990–2000) ===
The club continued in the First Division until 1991–92, when they finished bottom under the management of Paul Hegarty. The side won just five matches and lost twenty seven. Following a demonstration outside the main stand at Station Park, Hegarty was summarily dismissed, to be replaced by Tommy Campbell. The Loons remained in the Second Division until the close season of 1994, when league reorganisation saw the Loons find themselves in the new Third Division.

A successful campaign saw the club win the inaugural Third Division Championship with a 1–0 win at Ross County on 15 April 1995, Bobby Mann netting the goal. Despite a promising start to the 1995–96 season, Forfar were relegated back to the Third Division under the continued management of Campbell and the captaincy of Ian McPhee. In late 1996, McPhee took over as player-manager following the departure of Campbell to neighbours Arbroath, taking his side on an impressive run of results that saw them achieve promotion on goal difference ahead of Ross County.

Forfar survived a season in the Second Division, but were again relegated back to the Third Division at the end of the 1998–99 season. The club were promoted again the following season, finishing in third place as a minor league reconstruction took place, however McPhee resigned as manager in November 2000 following a poor start to the 2000–01 season, stating "I have put the club before myself – I could have been selfish, but Forfar football club is more important than Ian McPhee."

=== Neil Cooper (2000–2003) ===
McPhee was replaced by Neil Cooper, who led Forfar to Second Division safety by the end of the 2000–01 Second Division season, sending Queen's Park down on goal difference.

Cooper's only full season in charge, 2001–02, saw Forfar finish third in the Second Division. The Loons also reached the quarter-finals of the Scottish Cup, where they faced Rangers at Station Park. The match was televised live by BBC Scotland, and although the Loons lost 6–0, the club received a considerable cash bonus as a result of the tie.

Cooper remained manager until January 2003 when he moved back to become head youth coach for his former club Aberdeen, leaving the Loons in a strong league position.

=== Ray Stewart (2003–2004) ===
Between January 2003 and November 2004 The club were managed by former West Ham United and Dundee United full back Ray Stewart who had previously managerial experience with Livingston and Stirling Albion. Stewart guided Forfar to a penalty shootout win over Motherwell in the Third Round of the League Cup in October 2003, leading to another lucrative tie with Rangers at Ibrox which again finished 6–0 to Rangers. Stewart became increasingly unpopular with the fans towards the end of the 2003–04 season following a string of poor results, which left the Loons rooted in mid-table.

The 2004–05 season started with four straight wins and a 5–2 win away to St Mirren in the League Cup, leading to a tie with Dundee at Dens Park ending 4–0 to Dundee. A good run was also achieved in the Challenge Cup when the club beat Greenock Morton, Queen's Park and Clyde to reach the semi-finals only to be knocked out by Ross County in a 5–2 defeat. Unfortunately the club's performance in the league again declined and Stewart offered his resignation, following a 5–1 home defeat to Montrose in the Scottish Cup First Round – an offer which was accepted by the Forfar board.

=== Brian Fairley (2004–2005) ===
With Forfar floundering in the league, the board moved to appoint then Dumbarton manager Brian Fairley as Station Park boss, Fairley resigning from his post as Dumbarton manager earlier in the day. Fairley was to lead the club to mid-table safety by season end, cumulating in a 3–0 victory over champions Brechin City. Fairley resigned from his post in September 2005, citing the pressures of full-time work away from football.

=== Ray Farningham (2005–2006) ===
The club brought in former player Ray Farningham as manager, with another former player, George Shaw, appointed assistant manager. Despite some erratic performances, the Loons again secured 2nd Division status by season end – a season that included two victories over champions Gretna. After the season ended Ray Farningham moved to Gretna as chief scout.

=== George Shaw (2006–2007) ===
George Shaw was promoted to the position of manager, with long serving striker Paul Tosh stepping up to player-assistant manager. On 19 March 2007 Forfar Athletic parted company with Shaw after ten months in charge. Paul Tosh left shortly after, going on loan to Arbroath until the end of the 2007–08 season. This was following a spell that saw the Loons rooted to the foot of the Second Division, and having failed to progress in any of the season's cup competitions.

=== Jim Moffat (2007–2008) ===
Following Shaw's departure the club appointed former player and reserve team coach Jim Moffat as manager. A former manager of East Fife, Moffat's first game in charge was a 9–1 defeat to Greenock Morton on 7 April 2007, which saw Forfar relegated to the Third Division. The following season did not go well, and Moffat was sacked on 21 April 2008, with Forfar going on to finish bottom of the Third Division. Dick Campbell became Forfar's new manager on 8 May 2008.

=== Dick Campbell (2008–2015) ===
Dick Campbell became Forfar's manager on 8 May 2008 on a two-year deal, after Jim Moffat failed to improve the team's fortunes. Campbell's first season in charge of Forfar was full of highs and lows. The start of the season was a mixed affair with Forfar being unbeaten away from home but found lacking when playing at Station Park. With a dreadful winter and numerous games called off the months of March and April were for catch up and Dick was very close to leading the team into the play-offs for the Irn-Bru Second Division. During his first season at Station Park Dick cut the wage bill and due to good cup success took Forfar Athletic out of the red and into the black. On 13 December 2009 Campbell became embroiled in controversy regarding sectarian singing. On 16 May 2010 Dick and Ian Campbell got Forfar promoted to the second division through the playoffs with a 2–0 victory against local rivals Arbroath. On 14 May 2011, Forfar failed to reach the play-off final for First Division status, losing out to Ayr United, by an aggregate score of 7–4. The team also qualified for the play-offs at the end of the 2012–13 season. In the first leg against Dunfermline Athletic, they scored three times in the first half, eventually winning 3–1. In the second leg, however, poor discipline led to three of their players being sent off. Despite taking an early lead, they lost the match 3–1. In extra time, the eight men struggled against their full-time opponents, and Dunfermline eventually won 6–1, to go through 7–4 on aggregate.

On 3 August 2013, Forfar claimed arguably the biggest result in their history when they defeated Rangers 2–1 at Station Park in the first round of the 2013–14 Scottish League Cup, with both goals coming from Gavin Swankie.

In 2014–15 season Campbell almost led Forfar to their best achievement in modern times, a League One title, but missed out to Morton and lost a 3–1 lead to Alloa in the play-off final. After seven years in charge of the side, Campbell was sacked in December 2015, following a 1–0 defeat to Cowdenbeath left them third bottom of League One. Assistant manager Stewart Petrie was named caretaker manager.

=== Gary Bollan (2015–2017) ===
A week after Campbell was sacked, The Loons appointed former Airdrieonians manager Gary Bollan as his successor. Forfar had a disastrous season and finished bottom of League One, which meant automatic relegation to League Two. A swift return seemed to be on the cards with the team holding first place for virtually all season, only to collapse at the end and finish 2nd behind Arbroath. They had a second chance to be promoted via the play-offs, however, and they made the most of it, beating Annan Athletic and Peterhead to return to League One.

=== Jim Weir (2017–2019) ===
On 1 October 2017, Forfar appointed former Elgin City manager Jim Weir as Bollan’s successor.

Weir was involved in a car crash after a training session in September 2019. He left the club on 3 November, as he struggled to combine his work commitments and recovery from the car crash.

=== Stuart Malcolm (2019–2021) ===
On 10 November 2019, former Loons player Stuart Malcolm returned to Forfar Athletic as manager after being announced as Jim Weir's replacement.

Former club captain Malcolm had three spells with the north-east side as a central defender and most recently had been manager of Lowland League side East Kilbride, leading them to the league title the previous April.

=== Gary Irvine (2021–2022) ===
Gary Irvine joined Forfar in February 2019 until the end of the season. On 9 April 2021, Irvine agreed to take charge of the Loons after manager Stuart Malcolm and his assistants resigned from their positions. Irvine was announced as the club's new manager on 4 May. Despite coming close to promotion in the 2021–22 season, a very disappointing start to the following season which left the Loons bottom of the table led to Forfar releasing Irvine on 9 November 2022.

=== Ray McKinnon (2022–2024) ===
On 10 November 2022, Forfar Athletic confirmed the appointment of Ray McKinnon as the club’s new manager on a rolling contract until May 2025. McKinnon was sacked on 9 November 2024 with the club bottom of the SPFL. Jim Weir, previously in charge from 2017–2019, returned as manager 11 days later.

== Honours ==
- Scottish Second Division/Scottish League One:
  - Winners (1): 1983–84
- Scottish Third Division/Scottish League Two:
  - Winners (1): 1994–95
  - Runners-up (3): 1996–97, 2009–10, 2021–22
- Scottish Midlands Qualifying Cup:
  - Winners (1): 1946–47
- Forfarshire Cup:
  - Winners (9): 1905–06, 1907–08, 1930–31, 1978–79, 1983–84, 1990–91, 1994–95, 1995–96, 2014–15
- Forfarshire Charity Cup:
  - Winners (5): 1887–88, 1889–90, 1890–91, 1891–92, 1893–94
  - Runners-up (1): 1892–93
- Forfarshire County League:
  - Winners (2): 1897–98, 1898–99
  - Runners-up (1): 1899–1900

== Records ==
Record win: 14–1 v Lindertis 1 September 1888

Record defeat: 2–12 v King's Park 2 January 1930

Record home attendance: 10,780 v Rangers (7 February 1970)

Record goal scorer: John Clark (127, 1978–1991)

Most goals in a season: Dave Kilgour (45, Division II, 1929–30)

Most appearances: Ian McPhee (534, 1979–1998)

== Current squad ==
As of 10 September 2026

Note: Flags indicate national team as defined under FIFA eligibility rules; some limited exceptions apply. Players may hold more than one non-FIFA nationality.

No.	Pos.	Nation	Player
1	GK	SCO	Marc McCallum
2	DF	SCO	Aron Lynas
4	DF	SCO	Jack Wyllie (on loan from Rangers)
5	DF	SCO	Matty Allan
6	DF	SCO	Jake Dolzanski
7	MF	SCO	Ross MacLean
8	MF	SCO	Craig Slater
9	FW	SCO	Scott Shepherd
10	FW	SCO	Martin Rennie
11	MF	SCO	Adam Brown
12	MF	SCO	Blair Alston
14	DF	SCO	Angus Mailer (captain)

No.	Pos.	Nation	Player
15	DF	SCO	Mackenzie Lemon
16	MF	SCO	Aaron Arnott
18	MF	SCO	Callum Wilson
19	MF	SCO	Ethan Crombie (co-operation loan with Dundee)
20	MF	SCO	Aidan Haddow
21	GK	SCO	Neil Stafford (on loan from Hamilton Academical)
22	MF	SCO	Tyler Gadsen
23	FW	SCO	Luca Perrie (co-operation loan with Dundee)
24	MF	SCO	Rocco Hickey-Fugaccia
25	MF	SCO	Mark Whatley
26	DF	SCO	Marcus Syme (on loan from Hamilton Academical)

=== On loan ===
Note: Flags indicate national team as defined under FIFA eligibility rules; some limited exceptions apply. Players may hold more than one non-FIFA nationality.

No.	Pos.	Nation	Player
3	DF	SCO	Adam Livingstone (on loan at Johnstone Burgh)
17	FW	SCO	Jamie Richardson (on loan at Lochee United)

== Club officials ==
=== Board ===
- Chairman: Vacant
- Vice-chairman: Paul Stephen
- Directors: Scott Barn, Elaine Buchanan, David Keith, Fiona Keith, John Milne
- Secretary: Alan Shepherd
- Treasurer: Raymond Hutt
- Honorary life president: David McGregor

=== Coaching staff ===
- Manager: Jim Weir
- Assistant manager: Gavin Price
- Goalkeeping coach: Wayne Henderson
- Doctor: Dr Jane Crawford
- Sports scientist: Mark Farrell
- Therapist: Lara Jordan
- Groundsman/kitman: Martin Gray
