= Morten Wieghorst =

Danish footballer (born 1971)

Personal information
- Full name: Morten Wieghorst
- Date of birth: 25 February 1971 (age 55)
- Place of birth: Glostrup, Denmark
- Height: 1.90 m (6 ft 3 in)
- Position: Midfielder

Team information
- Current team: Denmark (assistant)

Senior career*
Years	Team	Apps	(Gls)
1989–1992	Lyngby FC	71	(4)
1992–1995	Dundee	90	(11)
1995–2002	Celtic	86	(10)
2002–2005	Brøndby IF	65	(14)
Total		312	(39)

International career
1990–1991	Denmark U-21	6	(0)
1994–2004	Denmark	30	(3)

Managerial career
- 2006–2011: FC Nordsjælland
- 2011–2013: Denmark U-21
- 2014–2015: AGF
- 2017–2018: AaB
- 2024: Denmark
Medal record
Men's football
Representing Denmark
FIFA Confederations Cup
Winner	1995 Saudi Arabia
- * Club domestic league appearances and goals

Morten Wieghorst (Danish pronunciation: [ˈmɒːtn̩ ˈviːˌhɒst]; born 25 February 1971) is a Danish association football manager and former player. He was most recently the assistant manager of the Denmark national football team from 2020 until 2026. He is the former head coach of the Denmark national under-21 football team and FC Nordsjælland in the Danish Superliga whom he guided to the 2010 and 2011 Danish Cup trophy.

During his active career, Wieghorst played as a midfielder. He started his career with Lyngby Boldklub, with whom he won the 1990 Danish Cup and 1992 Superliga titles. He then moved abroad and played ten seasons in Scottish football with Dundee and Celtic, and won the 1998 Scottish football championship with Celtic. He ended his career with Danish club Brøndby IF, after winning the 2005 Superliga and two Danish Cup trophies with the team. He played 30 matches and scored three goals for the Denmark national team from 1994 to 2004, won the 1995 Confederations Cup, and appeared in three games at the 1998 World Cup. He was named 2003 Danish Player of the Year, and received a 2003 Olympic Committee fair play award for missing a penalty kick on purpose.

== Playing career ==
=== Club ===
Born in Glostrup, he started his senior career with Lyngby Boldklub in 1989. and he was part of the 1990 Danish Cup winning Lyngby squad. He suffered an ankle injury in the summer of 1991, and returned to the team in September 1991. He played 24 games as Lyngby won the 1991–92 Danish Superliga championship. He took part in the 1992–93 UEFA Champions League qualification games against Scottish team Rangers in September 1992, and moved to play in Scotland shortly thereafter.

He joined Dundee in the Scottish Premier Division, but could not prevent the club from being relegated to the Scottish League Division One at the end of the 1993–94 season. They reached the 1995 Scottish League Cup Final in November 1995, but lost to Aberdeen. Wieghorst also lost the 1994 Scottish Challenge Cup Final with Dundee. He made 109 appearances and scored 17 goals in his time with the club.

He moved on to Premier Division team Celtic in December 1995. Injuries partly ruined his first two seasons in Glasgow. In the 1997–98 season, Wieghorst played 31 of 36 league matches for Celtic as the club won its 36th Scottish championship to end "Old Firm" archrivals Rangers' nine-year stranglehold on the title. In 2000, Wieghorst was diagnosed with the Guillain–Barré syndrome, and following treatment he spent a year in recovery before returning to play in a November 2001 Scottish Cup game. He played three league games for Celtic late in the 2001–02 season before he returned to Denmark.

He signed on a free transfer for defending Danish champions Brøndby IF in the summer 2002, as one of the first signings of new manager Michael Laudrup. In his first year at Brøndby, he most famously suffered a gashed eyebrow in the November 2002 game against Farum BK, but played on wearing a bloody head bandage and scored four goals in Brøndby's 7–1 victory. He was appointed vice-team captain behind Per Nielsen, and Wieghorst won his second Danish Cup title in 2003. In May 2004, Wieghorst suffered a knee injury in the "New Firm" local derby against archrivals F.C. Copenhagen. He returned to the starting line-up late in the 2004–05 season in April 2005, and was a part of the Brøndby team that won The Double of both league championship and cup trophy. In May 2005, less than a month after his rehabilitation, he announced his retirement at the season end on 26 June 2005.

=== International ===
Wieghorst made his international debut for the Denmark national under-21 football team in October 1990, and played six games for the team until September 1991. He made his debut for the Denmark national team in August 1994, when he came on as a half-time substitute and scored the deciding goal in the 2–1 friendly match win against Finland. He was a part of the Denmark squad that won the 1995 King Fahd Cup, where he came on as a substitute to replace the injured team captain Michael Laudrup in the 2–0 final win against Argentina. During his injured first seasons at Celtic, Wieghorst's international career went on a hiatus.

After his return to the Celtic team, Wieghorst became a mainstay in the Denmark national team from October 1997. He was selected to represent Denmark at the 1998 FIFA World Cup, and played three games at the tournament. Most remarkably, he came on as a substitute in the 82nd minute of the 1–1 draw with South Africa, only to be sent off three minutes later. In Denmark's ultimate qualification game for the 2000 European Championship, he scored in the 3–2 victory against Italy which secured Denmark's qualification for the main tournament. Having been brought on as a substitute in the 52nd minute, he scored to level the game at 2–2 in the 57th minute, before he was sent-off for his second yellow card in the 80th minute. This made him the only Denmark national team player to have been sent-off more than once. In October 1999, Wieghorst's national team career came to a halt again, due to his illness.

Wieghorst re-entered the Denmark national team in August 2002, while playing for Brøndby, as he played the 1–0 friendly match win against Scotland. In February 2003, he was selected for the Denmark League XI national football team, consisting of the best Danish players in the Superliga, to play a series of unofficial friendly matches against various Asian national teams. In the game against Iran, an Iranian player mistook a whistle from the crowd as being the referee's half-time signal, and picked the ball up with his hands in the penalty area. The referee gave a penalty kick, but following consultation with national team coach Morten Olsen, Wieghorst missed the penalty on purpose as a token of fair play, and Denmark XI lost 1–0. The incident made CNN's "Play of the Day" of 2 February 2003, and Wieghorst received an Olympic Committee fair play award. He was selected the 2003 Danish Player of the Year. He played his last national team game in April 2004, a 1–0 friendly match win against Scotland.

== Coaching career ==
=== Nordsjælland ===
After ending his active career he became assistant coach for FC Nordsjælland during the 2005–06 season. When manager Johnny Petersen was let go, Wieghorst was promoted to FC Nordsjælland manager for the following season. In his first year as manager, he led Nordsjælland to a fifth-place finish in the 2006–07 Danish Superliga season, the best finishing position since 2003. Despite finishing ninth in the 2007–08 Danish Superliga season, Nordsjælland qualified for the UEFA Cup via the UEFA Fair Play ranking. Wieghorst managed Nordsjælland to a run in the 2008–09 UEFA Cup defeating TVMK Tallinn from Estonia and Scottish club Queen of the South, before they were eliminated by Greek side Olympiacos. He managed Nordsjælland to the 2009–10 Danish Cup trophy, the first title in club history. The following year Wieghorst and Nordsjælland won the trophy again thereby defending the title.

=== Denmark U21 ===
On 28 February 2011 the Danish Football Association revealed that he would be the successor of Keld Bordinggaard as manager of the Danish national under-21 football team after the 2011 UEFA European Under-21 Football Championship in June that year. He continued as manager of FC Nordsjælland until the end of the 2010-11 Danish Superliga and led Nordsjælland to the 2010–11 Danish Cup trophy in one of his last games in charge of the team.

=== Assistant to Michael Laudrup at Swansea ===
On 7 February 2013, it was reported that he would join Swansea City as an assistant to club manager Michael Laudrup. On 4 February 2014, Swansea fired him alongside Michael Laudrup, just three days short of his year anniversary in the job.

=== AGF ===
On 30 May 2014, he was appointed as the new head coach of AGF. He signed a three-year contract. He got the team promoted to the Danish Superliga in his first season. He was sacked on 5 December 2015 due to a series of bad results in the 2015–16 Danish Superliga.

=== AaB ===
On 2 January 2017, he became the new manager of AaB in the Danish Superliga. He was sacked on 25 November 2018.

=== Danish national team ===
On 12 June 2019, it was announced that Wieghost would be assistant to Kasper Hjulmand at the Danish national team starting in July 2020. In 2023, he extended his contract to 2026.

When Hjulmand resigned following the UEFA Euro 2024, Wieghorst was made new manager of the national team on a short-term contract running for the rest of 2024. He never managed the team in a competitive game, since he had to go on sick leave on 26 August 2024, and he was replaced as caretaker by Lars Knudsen. On 24 October 2024, Brian Riemer was announced as new manager of the Danish team with Wieghorst continuing as assistant manager. He announced his departure as assistant coach in April 2026.

== Career statistics ==
=== International goals ===
Scores and results list Denmark's goal tally first, score column indicates score after each Wieghorst goal.

List of international goals scored by Morten Wieghorst
No.	Date	Venue	Opponent	Score	Result	Competition
1	17 August 1994	Copenhagen, Denmark	Finland	2–1	2–1	Friendly match
2	8 January 1995	Riyadh, Saudi Arabia	Saudi Arabia	2–0	2–0	1995 King Fahd Cup
3	8 September 1999	Naples, Italy	Italy	2–2	3–2	UEFA Euro 2000 qualifying

=== Managerial ===
As of match played 23 November 2018

Team	From	To	Record				
Team	From	To	G	W	D	L	Win %
Nordsjælland	1 July 2006	30 June 2011	195	79	45	71	40.51
Denmark U-21	1 July 2011	7 February 2013	12	5	5	2	41.67
AGF	1 July 2014	5 December 2015	57	27	17	13	47.37
AaB	2 January 2017	25 November 2018	74	24	25	25	32.43
Total			338	135	92	111	39.94

== Honours ==
=== Playing career ===
Lyngby BK

- Danish Superliga: 1991–92
- Danish Cup: 1990

Celtic

- Scottish Premier Division: 1997–98
- Scottish League Cup: 1997–98, 1999–2000
- Scottish Cup: Runner-up 1998–99

Brøndby IF

- Danish Superliga: 2004–05
- Danish Cup: 2002–03, 2004–05
- Danish Super Cup: 2002

Denmark

- King Fahd Cup: 1995

Individual

- Danish Player of the Year: 2003
- Olympic Committee fair play award: 2003
- Dundee FC Hall of Fame: 2019

=== Coaching career ===
FC Nordsjælland

- Danish Cup: 2009–10, 2010–11
