= Paul Tosh =

Scottish footballer (born 1973)

Personal information
- Full name: Paul James Tosh
- Date of birth: 18 October 1973 (age 53)
- Place of birth: Arbroath, Scotland
- Position: Striker

Senior career*
Years	Team	Apps	(Gls)
1991–1993	Arbroath	42	(13)
1993–1997	Dundee	106	(19)
1997–1999	Hibernian	22	(2)
1998–1999	→ Partick Thistle (loan)	10	(1)
1999	→ Exeter City (loan)	10	(2)
1999–2001	Raith Rovers	47	(13)
2000	→ Arbroath (loan)	3	(2)
2001–2007	Forfar Athletic	159	(68)
2007–2008	Arbroath	48	(6)
2008–2009	Cove Rangers		
2009–2011	Montrose	46	(21)
2011	Peterhead	6	(2)
Total		499	(149)
- * Club domestic league appearances and goals

Paul James Tosh (born 18 October 1973 in Arbroath) is a Scottish footballer. He started his career with his local club Arbroath before a move in 1993 to Tayside neighbours Dundee who paid £120,000 to take Paul to Dens Park.

Following three years at Dens Park, he moved to Hibernian with Lee Power for a combined fee of £200,000. However, Jim Duffy, who had signed Tosh, was soon fired from his position as manager. After struggling to get into the first team under Alex McLeish, he was sent out on loan to Partick Thistle and then Exeter City, before he moved to Raith Rovers. Paul scored 13 goals over his two seasons there but was released by the Kirkcaldy outfit.

A former Second Division player of the year, Tosh's consistent ability to score goals saw "Tosher" rack up nearly 90 goals in Forfar colours, averaging slightly better than a goal every other game. Tosh was player-assistant manager during the reign of former Forfar manager George Shaw. After only one match being caretaker manager he left on emergency loan to local rivals and his hometown team Arbroath in 2007. He returned to Arbroath in July 2007 and continued his scoring into season 2007–08.

Tosh signed for Tayport Juniors in June 2011.

Paul started working in the Construction Industry after his football career, notably spending time with Hillcrest Housing Association and Persimmon Homes North Scotland

Paul is also one of the committee members at Arbroath Victoria.
