= Neil Duffy =

Scottish footballer and coach

- Neil Duffy, when Troon F.C. Asst. Manager (October 2015)

Personal information
- Full name: Cornelius Duffy
- Date of birth: 5 June 1967 (age 59)
- Place of birth: Glasgow, Scotland
- Positions: Defender; midfielder

Senior career*
Years	Team	Apps	(Gls)
- Shamrocks
1985	Dundee United	0	(0)
1985–1989	Shamrocks		
1989–1990	Dundee United	0	(0)
1990–1993	Falkirk	121	(19)
1993–1996	Dundee	107	(11)
1996–1999	Dundee United	35	(1)
1999–2002	Ayr United	79	(12)
2002–2004	Dumbarton	32	(0)

Managerial career
- 2013–2015: Troon Under-19s
- 2015: Troon (Assistant Manager)
- 2015–2018: Whitletts Victoria
- * Club domestic league appearances and goals

Cornelius "Neil" Duffy (born 5 June 1967) is a Scottish football coach and former professional footballer who played in defence and midfield for Dundee United, Falkirk, Dundee, Ayr United and Dumbarton. He was appointed assistant manager of Troon in August 2015. He is now the manager of Viewfield Rovers in the SSMAFL.

== Early life ==
Neil Duffy was born in Glasgow on 5 June 1967, but brought up in Pietermaritzburg, South Africa. His father, also named Neil Duffy, was himself a professional footballer in Scotland and South Africa. Neil junior played local amateur football for Shamrocks, where his father was coach.

== Playing career ==
Duffy began his professional career with Dundee United at the age of 17 after passing a first team trial whilst on holiday in 1985. Soon afterwards, however, he returned to South Africa due to homesickness. In South Africa he again played for Shamrocks. He returned to Dundee United during the 1989-90 season but left for Falkirk without making a first team appearance. Duffy spent three years at Falkirk before moving to Dundee in 1993–94, where he stayed for a similar time. During his time at Dundee, he captained the side to the 1995 Scottish League Cup Final but was unsuccessful.

In August, Duffy rejoined Dundee United for a £200,000 transfer fee, finally making his first team debut in his third spell at the club. Like his previous two clubs, Duffy gave three years of service before moving on, this time to Ayr United. During his time at Ayr United, Duffy was able to help the team to two consecutive Scottish Cup semi-finals and the 2002 League Cup final. In 2002–03, Duffy moved to Dumbarton, where he stayed until retiring in 2004. His time at Dumbarton provided his one and only red card which came in his last ever appearance.

== Coaching career ==
After some time coaching at Ayr United's youth academy, Duffy was appointed as Troon under-19 coach in May 2013. He became assistant manager of the club in August 2015 before departing in December 2015.

On 15 December 2015, Duffy was named manager of Whitletts Victoria. He resigned from the role in January 2018.

== Honours ==
Falkirk

- Scottish Challenge Cup: 1993–94

== See also ==
- Dundee United F.C. season 1996-97
- Dundee United F.C. season 1997-98
- Dundee United F.C. season 1998-99
