= Michel Pageaud =

French footballer (born 1966)

Personal information
- Date of birth: 30 August 1966 (age 60)
- Place of birth: Luçon, France
- Height: 1.84 m (6 ft 0 in)
- Position: Goalkeeper

Senior career*
Years	Team	Apps	(Gls)
1987–1990	Angers	94	(0)
1990–1993	Valenciennes	94	(0)
1993–1996	Dundee	80	(0)
1996–1999	Valenciennes		
1999–2001	Stade Luconnais		
Total		268	(0)
- * Club domestic league appearances and goals

Michel Pageaud (born 30 August 1966) is a French former professional footballer who played as a goalkeeper for Angers SCO, Valenciennes and Scottish club Dundee. A month prior to joining Dundee in February 1994, he played in one reserve match for their city rivals Dundee United.

Pageaud played for Dundee in the 1995 Scottish League Cup Final defeat by Aberdeen. He returned to France at the end of the 1995–96 season under the Bosman ruling.
