= Dušan Vrťo =

Slovak footballer

Personal information
- Date of birth: 29 October 1965 (age 60)
- Place of birth: Banská Štiavnica, Czechoslovakia
- Position: Defender

Youth career
- SH Senica

Senior career*
Years	Team	Apps	(Gls)
1981–1983	SH Senica	34	(0)
1983–1984	Baník Ostrava	15	(2)
1984–1985	Dukla Banská Bystrica	5	(0)
1986–1992	Baník Ostrava	117	(2)
1992–1996	Dundee	119	(1)
1996–1999	Baník Ostrava	54	(1)
1999–2001	SKU Amstetten		

International career
1994	Slovakia	2	(0)
- * Club domestic league appearances and goals

Dušan Vrťo (Slovak pronunciation: [ˈduʂaɱ ˈʋr̩cɔ]; born 29 October 1965) is a Slovak former footballer, who played as defender for Senica, Baník Ostrava, Dukla Banská Bystrica, Dundee, SKU Amstetten and the Slovakia national football team.
