= Kevin Bain =

Scottish footballer

Personal information
- Full name: Kevin Bain
- Date of birth: 19 September 1972 (age 54)
- Place of birth: Kirkcaldy, Scotland
- Position: Central defender

Senior career*
Years	Team	Apps	(Gls)
1989–1997	Dundee	74	(2)
1997	Rotherham United	12	(0)
1997–1998	Stirling Albion	16	(0)
1998–2002	Brechin City	123	(24)
2002–2004	Peterhead	41	(11)
2004–2006	East Fife	53	(0)
- Rosyth Recreation
Total		319	(27)

International career
1992–1993	Scotland under-21	4	(0)
- * Club domestic league appearances and goals

Kevin Bain (born 19 September 1972) is a Scottish former footballer, who played for Dundee, Rotherham United, Stirling Albion, Brechin, Peterhead and East Fife.

Bain represented the Scotland national under-21 football team. He previously was a beaten finalist for the Scotland National U-16 team at 1989 FIFA U-16 World Championship and scored in the penalty shoot-out as Scotland lost to Saudi Arabia. The winning team was later accused of fielding several over-age players, but no formal investigation was conducted.[2][3]
