= Gary McKeown =

English footballer

Personal information
- Full name: Gary Joseph McKeown
- Date of birth: 19 October 1970 (age 56)
- Place of birth: Oxford, England

Youth career
- 1987–1989: Arsenal

Senior career*
Years	Team	Apps	(Gls)
1989–1992	Arsenal	0	(0)
1992	→ Shrewsbury Town (loan)	8	(1)
1992–1997	Dundee	58	(4)
1996	→ Exeter City (loan)	3	(0)
1997–1999	Yee Hope		(2)
1999	Hong Kong Rangers	0	(0)
1999–2002	Sun Hei		
2002–2003	Apollon Kalamarias		
2003–2004	Bishop's Stortford	29	(2)
2004–2005	Wealdstone	45	(8)
- * Club domestic league appearances and goals

Gary Joseph McKeown (born 19 October 1970) is an English retired professional footballer. He played in midfield for various clubs in England, Scotland, Hong Kong and Greece.
