= Iain Anderson (footballer) =

Scottish footballer

Personal information
- Full name: Iain William Anderson
- Date of birth: 23 July 1977 (age 49)
- Place of birth: Glasgow, Scotland
- Position: Midfielder

Youth career
- Dundee

Senior career*
| Years | Team | Apps | (Gls) |
| 1993–1999 | Dundee | 70 | (14) |
| 1999–2000 | Toulouse | | |
| 2000 | → Preston North End (loan) | 12 | (2) |
| 2000–2003 | Preston North End | 70 | (11) |
| 2003 | → Tranmere Rovers (loan) | 7 | (2) |
| 2003–2004 | Grimsby Town | 29 | (5) |
| 2004–2006 | Dundee | 33 | (3) |
| 2006–2007 | St Mirren | 11 | (3) |
| 2007–2008 | Ross County | 4 | (1) |
| 2008 | Ayr United | 6 | (1) |
| 2008–2009 | Elgin City | | |
| 2009 | Clydebank | | |

International career
| 1997–1999 | Scotland U21 | 13 | (1) |
- * Club domestic league appearances and goals as of 20:59, 20 October 2008 (UTC)

Iain William Anderson (born 23 July 1977) is a Scottish former professional footballer who played as a midfielder from 1993 to 2009.

He notably played for Preston North End and Dundee as well as playing in France for Ligue 1 side Toulouse. He also appeared for Tranmere Rovers, Grimsby Town, St Mirren, Ross County, Ayr United, Elgin City and Clydebank.

== Career ==
Anderson became the youngest ever scorer in the Scottish Premier Division, when he scored with a penalty at the age of 16 for Dundee against Hibernian. In 1999 he had a trial at Chelsea. His trickery, pace and powerful right foot earned him a move to the French side Toulouse, where he continued his career. In 2000 Anderson was taken on loan by then division 2 side, Preston North End. Anderson scored two goals for the club in his loan period and set many more up for another loan player, Brett Angell. Together, they are widely credited with cementing Preston North End's promotion to division 1 (now known as the Championship.) His successful loan spell earned him a then club record £500,000 permanent move to Preston North End in July 2000, and he scored a number of high quality goals for the club, most notably against Wolverhampton Wanderers and Manchester City. Anderson was famed for cutting inside whilst playing on the left-wing and unleashing powerful efforts at goal. He was also useful from set pieces and surprisingly good in the air for a winger.

His time at Preston was marred firstly by injuries and then by a change in manager, which saw Craig Brown replace David Moyes at the helm. Brown did not approve of Anderson's predominantly attacking play, and criticized him for his lack of defensive awareness. It is commonly thought that Anderson became unmotivated under Craig Brown and lost his focus. He was involved from the start in Preston North End's infamous victory in the Championship play-offs against Birmingham City (which Preston won following a penalty shootout, a game during which Birmingham City Manager, Trevor Francis, tried to take his players off the pitch in protest at the end the penalties were being taken from). Anderson also set up Richard Cresswell for Preston North End's goal against Chelsea in the FA Cup, whipping in a cross from a free kick, which Cresswell headed past Carlo Cudicini.

Subsequently, he was loaned out to Tranmere Rovers (where he scored on his debut and became very popular with the Tranmere fans), then Grimsby Town. He eventually moved from Preston North End permanently and rejoined his former club, Dundee. He then moved to St Mirren, however in March 2007 his contract with the club was terminated by mutual consent, due to numerous injuries. He has since played for Ross County (where he scored once against Queen's Park), Ayr United (where he scored once, again against Queen's Park), Elgin City and Clydebank.

== Retirement ==
Anderson retired from football aged 31 in 2009 for personal reasons.

== Honours ==
Preston North End

- Football League Second Division: 1999–2000
