= Ray Farningham =

Scottish footballer and manager

Personal information
- Full name: Raymond Farningham
- Date of birth: 10 April 1961 (age 65)
- Place of birth: Dundee, Scotland
- Position: Midfielder

Team information
- Current team: Lochee United (assistant manager)

Youth career
- Dundee United

Senior career*
Years	Team	Apps	(Gls)
1978–1986	Forfar Athletic	240	(29)
1986–1989	Motherwell	76	(12)
1989–1992	Dunfermline Athletic	45	(1)
1992–1994	Partick Thistle	72	(15)
1994–1998	Dundee	79	(8)
1998	Forfar Athletic (loan)	9	(1)

Managerial career
- 2005–2006: Forfar Athletic
- 2011–2012: Montrose
- * Club domestic league appearances and goals

Ray Farningham (born 10 April 1961) is a Scottish former footballer who played as a midfielder for a handful of Scottish clubs. He previously managed Forfar Athletic, Montrose and was the assistant manager of Dundee. Ray is now assistant manager at junior side Lochee United.

== Career ==
Farningham trained as a youth with Dundee United before beginning his senior career with Forfar Athletic, making his debut towards the end of the 1970s. In his seven years at Station Park, Farningham was part of the sides which won the 1983–84 Scottish Second Division title and which earlier reached the 1981–82 Scottish Cup semi-final, losing to Rangers after a replay. Full-time football beckoned for Farningham and he joined Motherwell for £12,000 in 1986. Farningham spent three years at Fir Park before a similar spell at East End Park with Dunfermline Athletic. In the early 1990s, Farningham joined Partick Thistle, again for three years, before returning to his hometown to join Dundee. Two years after signing, Farningham began to combine playing duties with coaching the youngsters at Dens Park, and at the end of his career, returned to first club Forfar on loan, scoring once during his temporary stay.

Following his retirement from playing, Farningham continued as a coach at Dundee, stepping up to coach the senior players before becoming assistant to Jim Duffy. In July 2001 and prior to Duffy's arrival, Farningham received a three-month dugout ban after his behaviour during an under-21 match two months previously. In September 2005, Farningham returned to Forfar as manager, taking over from Brian Fairley, who had resigned. Farningham won his first two matches and kept Forfar in the Second Division but left in May 2006 to become chief scout at divisional rivals Gretna, who had won the championship that season.

Farningham was made redundant in 2008 following Gretna's demise and was working on a building site before returning to Dundee in November 2008 as Jocky Scott's assistant.

Farningham was appointed interim manager of Montrose in March 2011, and given the post permanently in early April.

Farningham returned to Dundee as assistant manager in May 2012.

== Honours ==
=== Forfar ===
- Scottish Second Division: 1

1983–84
