= Gerry Britton =

Scottish footballer and manager (born 1970)

Personal information
- Full name: Gerard Joseph Britton
- Date of birth: 20 October 1970 (age 56)
- Place of birth: Glasgow, Scotland
- Position: Striker

Team information
- Current team: Partick Thistle (chief executive)

Youth career
- Celtic

Senior career*
Years	Team	Apps	(Gls)
1990–1992	Celtic	2	(0)
1991–1992	→ Reading (loan)	2	(0)
1992–1994	Partick Thistle	62	(15)
1994–1996	Dundee	68	(15)
1996–1999	Dunfermline Athletic	60	(18)
1998	→ Raith Rovers (loan)	5	(1)
1999–2001	Livingston	30	(9)
2001–2005	Partick Thistle	94	(21)
2005	Berwick Rangers	1	(0)
2005	Motherwell	3	(0)
2005	Dundee	2	(0)
2005–2006	Brechin City	23	(3)
2006–2008	Stranraer	1	(0)
Total		363	(82)

Managerial career
- 2003–2004: Partick Thistle
- 2006–2008: Stranraer
- 2018: Partick Thistle (caretaker)
- 2019: Partick Thistle (caretaker)
- * Club domestic league appearances and goals

Gerard Joseph Britton (born 20 October 1970 in Glasgow) is a Scottish former footballer, who played as a striker. He was last formerly the chief executive of Partick Thistle, who he previously played for and managed. He left his position at the end of the 22/23 season.

== Playing career ==
Britton began his playing career with Celtic, making two league appearances and spending time on loan with Reading, where he played the same amount games before beginning the first of two spells at Partick Thistle in 1992. In two years at Firhill, Britton played in over sixty league matches, scoring fifteen times before moving to Dundee. Again, this was to be the first in two spells at a club for Britton, and he managed a similar record at Dens Park before signing for Dunfermline Athletic in 1996. Britton managed thirteen league goals in his first season at East End Park, helping The Pars to fifth place in the league. The following season, Britton only appeared in around half as many matches and scored just three times as the club finished eighth. In 1998–99, Britton began the season in the first team but after just one goal by mid-November, had a month on loan with Raith Rovers, where he scored once in five matches. He returned to the Dunfermline team in December but with only more goal all season, found himself released in the summer.

Britton joined Second Division champions Livingston in June and played in around half the club's league fixtures, scoring five times. The following season, he played slightly fewer matches but scored a hat-trick in his final appearance as Livi won the First Division. Rather than move back into the Premier League, Britton stayed in the First Division by returning to Partick Thistle, who had just clinched the Second Division title. Britton hit twelve goals in the league as The Jags won a second successive title, ensuring he also won a second successive First Division title. Thistle finished in tenth place in 2002–03 with Britton netting five league goals. In December the following season, Britton was appointed co-manager with Derek Whyte but the pair could not prevent Thistle from relegation.

In 2004–05, Britton played once – in September – before being dismissed from Thistle in December 2004. After training with Motherwell, Britton signed a short-term deal in March, making three substitute appearances towards the end of the season. Britton then had a short second spell with Dundee at the start of 2005–06, combining his playing duties with an assistant manager role, before having his contract terminated in August. Britton, who had been acting as caretaker manager, joined Brechin City a week later and played out the season with them

== After playing ==
At the end of the 2005/06 season, Britton left Brechin to become manager of Stranraer Britton made his last senior appearance in November 2006 as an 85th-minute substitute but under his leadership, Stranraer finished in the relegation play-off place and were relegated after losing to East Fife. In January 2008, with the team lying third, Britton won the Third Division Manager of the Month award for December but resigned just a month later to return to Partick Thistle for the third time as assistant manager.

On 7 October 2013, Britton became academy director at Partick Thistle. Britton was appointed Partick Thistle chief executive in May 2018, succeeding Ian Maxwell. Following the sacking of Alan Archibald in October 2018, Britton was made caretaker manager.

He has also worked as a criminal defence lawyer.

== Honours ==
Livingston

- Scottish First Division: 2000–01

Partick Thistle

- Scottish First Division: 2001–02
