= Jim Duffy (footballer) =

Scottish footballer and manager

Personal information
- Date of birth: 27 April 1959 (age 67)
- Place of birth: Glasgow, Scotland
- Position: Defender

Youth career
- Maryhill
- 1978–1979: Celtic

Senior career*
Years	Team	Apps	(Gls)
1979–1982	Celtic	0	(0)
1982–1985	Greenock Morton	119	(3)
1985–1988	Dundee	83	(2)
1990	Dundee	8	(0)
1990–1992	Partick Thistle	72	(4)
1992–1996	Dundee	108	(0)
Total		390	(9)

International career
1986	Scotland U21	1	(0)

Managerial career
- 1988–1989: Falkirk
- 1993–1996: Dundee
- 1996–1998: Hibernian
- 2002–2005: Dundee
- 2007: Norwich City (caretaker)
- 2009–2010: Brechin City
- 2011–2014: Clyde
- 2014–2018: Greenock Morton
- 2018–2021: Dumbarton
- 2021: Ayr United
- 2022–2023: Clyde
- * Club domestic league appearances and goals

James Duffy (born 27 April 1959) is a Scottish football coach and former player, who is currently assistant head coach at Scottish Championship club Queen's Park.

During his playing career he played for Celtic, Greenock Morton, Dundee (three spells) and Partick Thistle.

His managerial career has involved spells with Falkirk, Hibernian, Dundee (two spells – first as player-manager), Brechin City, Greenock Morton, Dumbarton and Ayr United. Duffy also had a brief director of football role at Hearts and an extensive coaching career including spells in English football.

== Playing career ==
Duffy was born in Glasgow, growing up in the Maryhill area of the city (specifically the Wyndford estate) where he was a childhood friend and neighbour of Charlie Nicholas. Like Nicholas, Duffy began his senior career with Celtic. Duffy, however, was unable to follow his friend into the Celtic first team and moved to Greenock Morton. His career developed greatly there, and in 1985 he was named Scottish PFA Players' Player of the Year despite Morton being relegated.

He moved to Dundee, only for his career to apparently be ended by injury aged only 28. After brief spells as Airdrieonians assistant manager in 1988, and then as manager of Falkirk, he made a playing comeback with Dundee before joining Partick Thistle. Duffy then returned to Dundee for a third spell in 1992 as player/assistant manager to Simon Stainrod. Duffy then succeeded Stainrod to become player-manager in the autumn of 1993.

== Managerial career ==
=== Early career ===
Duffy led First Division side Dundee to the Scottish League Cup Final in November 1995, but the team lost 2–0 to Aberdeen. Duffy followed this with an unsuccessful spell as manager of Hibernian. After working for Chelsea and Portsmouth as a coach, he returned yet again to Dundee for a second stint as manager in 2002.

=== Second spell at Dundee ===
He was appointed manager on 4 July 2002. During his second spell as manager at Dens Park he again led Dundee to Hampden, this time for the 2003 Scottish Cup Final against Rangers, which Dundee lost 1–0. As Rangers also won the Scottish Premier League, Dundee qualified for the UEFA Cup.

During November 2003 the club went into administration due to the gross financial mismanagement by the club's owners, Peter and Jimmy Marr. Going into administration meant that Dundee lost most of their talented players, but the team battled on and managed to avoid relegation that season. In the following season, however, Dundee struggled with a threadbare squad and were relegated on the last day of the season. Duffy stayed on with the blessing of the board to try to get the club back into the SPL at the first attempt. However, on 24 August 2005, the board then decided to sack Duffy after just four games of the new season, even though Dundee were top of the Scottish First Division.

=== Director of football at Hearts ===
He joined the coaching staff at Hearts at the end of January 2006 and was promoted to director of football two weeks later on a contract until the end of the 2005–06 season. Duffy spent barely a month in that position, however, as he was dismissed by the club, along with manager Graham Rix, on 22 March 2006.

=== Norwich City ===
On 9 February 2007, Duffy was appointed the Assistant Manager to Peter Grant at Norwich. When Grant left Norwich on 9 October, Duffy was made caretaker manager. But after recording losses against Bristol City, Burnley and WBA he was not awarded the job on a full-time basis. Duffy left Norwich after Glenn Roeder was appointed Norwich manager on 30 October.

=== Brechin City ===
Duffy was appointed as Brechin City manager in January 2009, replacing Michael O'Neill, who had left the club to manager Shamrock Rovers a month earlier. Duffy resigned after Brechin were beaten 3–0 on aggregate by Cowdenbeath in the First Division play-offs in May 2010.

=== Clyde ===
Duffy was appointed temporary manager of Clyde on 6 February 2011. Duffy appointed his former Partick Thistle teammate Chic Charnley as his assistant two day later. He succeeded in lifting Clyde off the bottom of the Third Division briefly, but finished the season last, and agreed to stay with the club for the 2011–12 season. He was appointed permanent manager on 28 April 2011. Duffy chose to stay at Clyde because of job security in a time when an average managerial reign at a club in Britain lasted approximately less than 15 months and in agreement with the Clyde board, progression on the field would take time for the club.

At the start of the 2011–12 season, Duffy's Clyde defeated his ex managing team Brechin City 4–2 away and East Stirlingshire 7–1. On 1 February 2012, Duffy was appointed on to the club's board. His Clyde team could only muster back-to-back two ninth-place finishes in seasons 2011–12 and 2012–13. Nairn County of the Highland League knocked his Clyde team out of the Scottish Cup after a replay in October 2012.

Duffy was awarded manager of the month in League Two for October 2013 after an unbeaten month with Clyde in the league and Scottish Cup, The team stretched that unbeaten run to ten games between October and December, but a 3–1 home defeat to Peterhead on 7 December ended that run. They secured a League Two play-off spot in the penultimate league match of the season with a 4–0 home defeat of Albion Rovers, but were beaten by East Fife after a penalty shootout in the semi-finals. Soon afterwards, Duffy resigned as manager of Clyde to take a similar position at Morton.

=== Greenock Morton ===
Duffy took over from Kenny Shiels as Greenock Morton manager on 19 May 2014. He signed a two-year contract with the club. His first match was a 1–0 home win over Spartans in the Scottish Challenge Cup on 26 July 2014. Three wins and a defeat in the league saw Duffy awarded manager of the month in League One for November 2014. His Morton team, however, did suffer a shocker in the Scottish Cup at the hands of Spartans in a 2–1 defeat in November, a Spartans team that had knocked out his former club Clyde in the previous round. He eventually led the Ton to the Scottish League One title which was clinched on the final day in a closely fought contest in the 2014–15 season, his first silverware as a manager. After leading Forfar Athletic on goal difference going into the last game, Morton recovered from 1–0 down against Peterhead to win 3–1 at home on the last day to win the title by three points and clinch automatic promotion to the Scottish Championship.

After successfully keeping Morton in the Championship, Duffy signed a new two-year deal on his 57th birthday, He was awarded the Championship Manager of the Month for October 2016.

After reaching the play-offs, Duffy was nominated for the SPFL Manager of the Year. Whilst he did not win that award, he was named Ladbrokes Championship Manager of the Season in May 2017. Duffy was sacked on 29 April 2018 after a run of defeats saw Morton fail to make the Scottish Premiership playoffs, finishing 7th in the Championship.

=== Dumbarton ===
Duffy was appointed Dumbarton manager in October 2018, following the sacking of Stephen Aitken. His first match in charge was a 4–0 victory against East Fife. After a difficult start to his time with the club, the Sons ended the 2018–19 season in sixth place in Scottish League One, losing just twice in their final 15 games. They again finished sixth in the 2019-20 season, which was curtailed by the worldwide COVID-19 pandemic. Duffy left Dumbarton at the end of the 2020–21 season, when they avoided relegation by winning play-off ties with Stranraer and Edinburgh City.

=== Ayr United ===
Duffy joined Ayr United as assistant to David Hopkin, then became caretaker manager in September 2021 when Hopkin resigned. On 1 October, Duffy was appointed Ayr United manager on a permanent basis. Duffy was relieved of his duties on 20 December.

=== Second spell at Clyde and director of football ===
After eight years, Duffy was re-appointed manager of Clyde on 7 November 2022, replacing long-term manager Danny Lennon. Despite, only losing one of their final six league matches, the Bully Wee were relegated to Scottish League Two after defeat in the playoff final to Annan Athletic.

On 24 May 2023, Clyde announced that Duffy had been promoted to director of football as part of 'a review of the football department' with the implementation of a 'new approach'. Three months later, on 18 August 2023, Clyde announced that Duffy had left the club with immediate effect.

== Personal life ==
Duffy suffered a heart attack in June 2020.

== Achievements ==
=== Honours ===
==== Player ====
Greenock Morton

- Scottish First Division: 1983–84

==== Manager ====
Greenock Morton

- Scottish League One : 2014–15

Dumbarton

- Scottish League One play-offs : 2020–21

=== Individual ===
- Greenock Morton
  - Scottish PFA Players' Player of the Year: 1984–85
  - SPFL League One Manager of the Month: November 2014
  - SPFL Championship Manager of the Month: November 2016
  - PFA Scotland Manager of the Year: 2016-17 (nominee)
  - Ladbrokes Championship Manager of the Season: 2016-17
- Dundee
  - SPL Manager of the Month: January 2003
  - SPL Manager of the Month: March 2003
  - SPL Manager of the Month: January 2004
- Clyde
  - SPFL League Two Manager of the Month: October 2013

== Managerial statistics ==
As of match played 19 May 2023

Team	From	To	Record				
Team	From	To	G	W	D	L	Win %
Falkirk	September 1988	October 1989	53	27	11	15	50.94
Dundee	August 1993	December 1996	137	57	42	38	41.61
Hibernian	1 January 1997	31 January 1998	46	8	15	23	17.39
Dundee	4 July 2002	24 August 2005	142	44	38	60	30.99
Brechin City	9 January 2009	19 May 2010	45	18	10	17	40.00
Clyde	6 February 2011	19 May 2014	145	48	29	68	33.10
Greenock Morton	19 May 2014	29 April 2018	181	80	40	61	44.20
Dumbarton	21 October 2018	24 May 2021	94	33	18	43	35.11
Ayr United	9 September 2021	20 December 2021	20	7	6	7	35.00
Clyde	7 November 2022	24 May 2023	29	4	10	15	13.79
Total			892	326	219	347	36.55

- Initially caretaker and appointed permanently on 1 October 2021
- Ayr United statistics include 3-0 forfeit Challenge Cup defeat to Rangers B (ineligible player in an initial 3–0 win).
