= 1995–96 Heart of Midlothian F.C. season =

Heart of Midlothian
1995–96 season
- Manager: Jim Jefferies
- Stadium: Tynecastle Stadium
- Scottish Premier Division: 4th
- Scottish Cup: Final
- League Cup: Quarter-final
- Top goalscorer: League: John Robertson (12); All: John Robertson (14)
- Highest home attendance: 15,871 v Celtic Scottish Premier Division 17 January 1996
- Lowest home attendance: 7,732 v Alloa Athletic League Cup 19 August 1995
- Average home league attendance: 12,078

The 1995–96 season was Heart of Midlothian F.C.'s 13th consecutive season of play in the Scottish Premier Division. Hearts also competed in the Scottish Cup and the Scottish League Cup.

== Fixtures ==
=== Friendlies ===
28 July 1995 Friendly	Peterhead	0–6	Hearts
			Murie 20' Cramb 40' Leitch 45' Colquhoun Hamilton Robertson 88' (pen.)	Attendance: 400

29 July 1995 Friendly	Elgin City	0–4	Hearts
			Wright Robertson Locke	Attendance: 900

30 July 1995 Friendly	Montrose	3–3	Hearts
	Goal		Mackay Levein Hamilton	Attendance: 800

5 August 1995 Friendly	Derby County	3–3	Hearts
	Goal		Robertson Hagen	Attendance: 5,079

9 August 1995 Friendly	Hearts	0–1	Newcastle United	Tynecastle Stadium
			Beardsley 65'	Attendance: 13,337; Referee: W Crombie

12 August 1995 Friendly	Hearts	5–1	Manchester City	Tynecastle Stadium
	Hamilton 5' Johnston 19' Colquhoun 45', 51' Hagen 57'		Summerbee 21'	Attendance: 6,879

=== League Cup ===
19 August 1995 League Cup R2	Hearts	3– 0	Alloa Athletic	Tynecastle Stadium
	Hamilton 10' McPherson 40' Leitch 84'			Attendance: 7,732

30 August 1995 League Cup R3	Hearts	2– 1	Dunfermline Athletic	Tynecastle Stadium
	Hagen 2' McPherson 55'		Bieman 19'	Attendance: 12,498; Referee: Kenny Clark

20 September 1995 League Cup QF	Dundee	4– 4 (a.e.t.)	Hearts	Dens Park
	Shaw 36', 38' Tosh Wieghorst 95'		Colquhoun 54' McPherson 74' Lawrence 92' Robertson 107' (pen.)	Attendance: 9,528; Referee: Mottram

=== Scottish Cup ===
31 January 1996 Scottish Cup R3	Hearts	1–0	Partick Thistle	Tynecastle Stadium
	Ritchie 63'			Attendance: 13,770; Referee: Hugh Dallas

17 February 1996 Scottish Cup R4	Kilmarnock	1–2	Hearts	Rugby Park
	Anderson		Berry Ritchie	Attendance: 15,173

7 March 1996 Scottish Cup QF	St Johnstone	1–2	Hearts	McDiarmid Park
	O'Boyle		Lawrence McPherson	Attendance: 9,951; Referee: Jim McCluskey

6 April 1996 Scottish Cup SF	Hearts	2–1	Aberdeen	Hampden Park
	Robertson Johnston		Shearer	Attendance: 27,785

18 May 1996 1996 Scottish Cup Final	Hearts	1–5	Rangers	Hampden Park
	Colquhoun		Laudrup Durie	Attendance: 37,730; Referee: Hugh Dallas

=== Scottish Premier Division ===
26 August 1995 Scottish Premier Division	Hearts	1–1	Motherwell	Tynecastle Stadium
	Hagen 68'		Arnott 64'	Attendance: 10,971

9 September 1995 Scottish Premier Division	Hearts	4–1	Falkirk	Tynecastle Stadium
	Lawrence 14' Colquhoun 19' (51) Robertson 66' (pen.)		McDonald 33'	Attendance: 11,531; Referee: Jim McCluskey

16 September 1995 Scottish Premier Division	Partick Thistle	2–0	Hearts	Firhill Stadium
	Docherty 11' McWilliams 89'			Attendance: 5,396

23 September 1995 Scottish Premier Division	Hearts	0–4	Celtic	Tynecastle Stadium
			McLaughlin 9' Walker 47'	Attendance: 13,696; Referee: Robert Orr

1 October 1995 Scottish Premier Division	Hibs	2–2	Hearts	Easter Road
	Donald 61' McGinlay 73'		McPherson 40' Robertson 92'	Attendance: 12,374; Referee: Willie Young

4 October 1995 Scottish Premier Division	Hearts	1–2	Aberdeen	Tynecastle Stadium
	Robertson 25'		Dodds 18' Booth 60'	Attendance: 10,927; Referee: Hugh Dallas

7 October 1995 Scottish Premier Division	Kilmarnock	3–1	Hearts	Rugby Park
	Brown 43' McKee 63'		Lawrence	Attendance: 6,721

14 October 1995 Scottish Premier Division	Hearts	4–2	Raith Rovers	Tynecastle Stadium
	Millar 10' Lawrence 12', 77' Robertson 66'		Graham 64' Crawford 81'	Attendance: 10,133; Referee: AM Roy

21 October 1995 Scottish Premier Division	Rangers	4–1	Hearts	Ibrox Stadium
	Durie Gascoigne Salenko		Millar	Attendance: 45,155

28 October 1995 Scottish Premier Division	Falkirk	2–0	Hearts	Brockville Park
	Weir 24' Johnston 90'			Attendance: 6,858

4 November 1995 Scottish Premier Division	Hearts	3–0	Partick Thistle	Tynecastle Stadium
	McWilliams 10' (own goal); Millar 65'; Eskilsson 69'			Attendance: 10,094

7 November 1995 Scottish Premier Division	Motherwell	0–0	Hearts	Fir Park
				Attendance: 5,595; Referee: Willie Young

11 November 1995 Scottish Premier Division	Hearts	2–1	Kilmarnock	Tynecastle Stadium
	Locke; Robertson		McKee 85'	Attendance: 10,442

19 November 1995 Scottish Premier Division	Hearts	2–1	Hibs	Tynecastle Stadium
	Millar 31'; Robertson 55' (pen.)		Jackson 51'	Attendance: 12,074; Referee: Kenny Clark

25 November 1995 Scottish Premier Division	Celtic	3–1	Hearts	Hampden Park
	Collins		Bruno	Attendance: 34,032

2 December 1995 Scottish Premier Division	Hearts	0–2	Rangers	Tynecastle Stadium
			McCoist Pen.' John Gascoigne	Attendance: 15,105

9 December 1995 Scottish Premier Division	Raith Rovers	1–1	Hearts	Stark's Park
	Lennon		Robertson	Attendance: 6,349; Referee: M Pocock

16 December 1995 Scottish Premier Division	Aberdeen	1–2	Hearts	Pittodrie
	Windass 1'		Johnston 78' Colquhoun 80'	Attendance: 12,308

1 January 1996 Scottish Premier Division	Hibs	2–1	Hearts	Easter Road
	Pointon 7'		Harper 28' O'Neill 44'	Attendance: 14,872; Referee: W Crombie

6 January 1996 Scottish Premier Division	Partick Thistle	0–1	Hearts	Firhill Stadium
			McManus 90'	Attendance: 4,618

10 January 1996 Scottish Premier Division	Hearts	4–0	Motherwell	Tynecastle Stadium
	Fulton 17' Colquhoun 32' Johnston 50' (84)			Attendance: 9,288; Referee: A M Roy

13 January 1996 Scottish Premier Division	Hearts	2–1	Falkirk	Tynecastle Stadium
	Robertson Fulton		Kirk	Attendance: 11,560

17 January 1996 Scottish Premier Division	Hearts	1–2	Celtic	Tynecastle Stadium
	Robertson 40'		Van Hooijdonk 76' Walker 82'	Attendance: 15,871; Referee: Eric Martindale

20 January 1996 Scottish Premier Division	Rangers	0–3	Hearts	Ibrox Stadium
			Johnston	Attendance: 45,096

3 February 1996 Scottish Premier Division	Hearts	2–0	Raith Rovers	Tynecastle Stadium
	Robertson Locke			Attendance: 10,183

10 February 1996 Scottish Premier Division	Hearts	1–3	Aberdeen	Tynecastle Stadium
	Robertson		Glass Shearer Windass 68'	Attendance: 14,314; Referee: Kenny Clark

24 February 1996 Scottish Premier Division	Kilmarnock	0–2	Hearts	Rugby Park
			Colquhoun Robertson	Attendance: 8,022; Referee: Mike McCurry

2 March 1996 Scottish Premier Division	Celtic	4–0	Hearts	Celtic Park
	Donnelly McLaughlin McStay Van Hooijdonk			Attendance: 37,034

16 March 1996 Scottish Premier Division	Hearts	1–1	Hibs	Tynecastle Stadium
	Mackay		Dow	Attendance: 14,923; Referee: LW Mottram

23 March 1996 Scottish Premier Division	Hearts	2–5	Partick Thistle	Tynecastle Stadium
	Johnston Eskilsson		Cameron Lyons Macdonald Turner	Attendance: 9,610

30 March 1996 Scottish Premier Division	Falkirk	0–2	Hearts	Brockville Park
			Ritchie Locke	Attendance: 5,164

10 April 1996 Scottish Premier Division	Hearts	2–0	Rangers	Tynecastle Stadium
	Pointon Johnston			Attendance: 15,350; Referee: Hugh Dallas

13 April 1996 Scottish Premier Division	Raith Rovers	1–3	Hearts	Stark's Park
	Lennon 74' (pen.)		Cameron 42' Pointon 47' Mackay 73'	Attendance: 4,956; Referee: George Clyde

20 April 1996 Scottish Premier Division	Aberdeen	1–1	Hearts	Pittodrie
	Windass (pen.)		Locke	Attendance: 11,303

27 April 1996 Scottish Premier Division	Hearts	1–0	Kilmarnock	Tynecastle Stadium
	McManus			Attendance: 11,329

4 May 1996 Scottish Premier Division	Motherwell	1–1	Hearts	Fir Park
	Davies		Cameron	Attendance: 8,301

== League table ==
Pos	Team	Pld	W	D	L	GF	GA	GD	Pts	Qualification or relegation
2	Celtic	36	24	11	1	74	25	+49	83	Qualification for the UEFA Cup qualifying round (Note: Aberdeen qualified for the UEFA Cup by winning the League Cup.)
3	Aberdeen	36	16	7	13	52	45	+7	55	Qualification for the UEFA Cup qualifying round
4	Heart of Midlothian	36	16	7	13	55	53	+2	55	Qualification for the Cup Winners' Cup qualifying round (Note: As Rangers, the winners of the Scottish Cup, qualified for the Champions League via their league position, the place in the Cup Winners' Cup was passed to the cup runner-up, Heart of Midlothian.)
5	Hibernian	36	11	10	15	43	57	−14	43	
6	Raith Rovers	36	12	7	17	41	57	−16	43	

Source: Soccerbase
Rules for classification: 1) Points; 2) Goal difference; 3) Goals scored

== Stats ==
=== Scorers ===
Pos	PLayer	SPL	SC	LC	Total
FW	(Scotland) John Robertson	12	1	1	14
MF	(Scotland) Allan Johnston	8	1	0	9
FW	(Scotland) John Colquhoun	5	1	1	7
FW	(Scotland) Alan Lawrence	4	1	1	6
DF	(Scotland) Dave McPherson	1	1	3	5
MF	(Scotland) Gary Locke	4	0	0	4
MF	(Scotland) John Millar	4	0	0	4
DF	(England) Neil Pointon	3	0	0	3
DF	(Scotland) Paul Ritchie	1	2	0	3
MF	(Scotland) Gary Mackay	2	0	0	2
MF	(Scotland) Colin Cameron	2	0	0	2
FW	(Sweden) Hans Eskilsson	2	0	0	2
MF	(Scotland) Steve Fulton	2	0	0	2
DF	(Scotland) Allan McManus	2	0	0	2
MF	(Scotland) David Hagen	1	0	1	2
DF	(Italy) Pasquale Bruno	1	0	0	1
MF	(Scotland) Neil Berry	0	1	0	1
MF	(Scotland) Brian Hamilton	0	0	1	1
MF	(Scotland) Scott Leitch	0	0	1	1

== See also ==
- List of Heart of Midlothian F.C. seasons
