= 1995–96 Celtic F.C. season =

Celtic
1995–96 season
- Manager: Tommy Burns
- Stadium: Celtic Park
- Scottish Premier Division: 2nd
- Scottish Cup: Semi-finals
- Scottish League Cup: Quarter-finals
- UEFA Cup Winners' Cup: Second round
- Top goalscorer: Pierre van Hooijdonk (26)
Home colours	Away colours

During the 1995–96 Scottish football season, Celtic competed in the Scottish Premier Division.

== Season summary ==
Celtic lost only once in the league all season, but also drew eleven games and so they finished in second, four points off champions Rangers. As a result, Celtic qualified for the UEFA Cup.

Celtic had poor form in the cup competitions, being knocked out by Rangers in both domestic cups and being knocked out by eventual cup winners Paris Saint-Germain in the Cup Winners' Cup.

== Squad ==
Note: Flags indicate national team as defined under FIFA eligibility rules; some limited exceptions apply. Players may hold more than one non-FIFA nationality.

No.	Pos.	Nation	Player
—	GK	SCO	Stewart Kerr
—	GK	SCO	Gordon Marshall
—	DF	SCO	Tom Boyd
—	DF	SCO	Stuart Gray
—	DF	SCO	John Hughes
—	DF	SCO	Malky Mackay
—	DF	SCO	Tosh McKinlay
—	DF	SCO	Jackie McNamara
—	DF	ALB	Rudi Vata
—	MF	SCO	Simon Donnelly
—	MF	SCO	Peter Grant

No.	Pos.	Nation	Player
—	MF	SCO	Brian McLaughlin
—	MF	SCO	Paul McStay
—	MF	SCO	Phil O'Donnell
—	MF	SCO	Brian O'Neil
—	MF	DEN	Morten Wieghorst
—	FW	SCO	John Collins
—	FW	SCO	Willie Falconer
—	FW	SCO	Chris Hay
—	FW	SCO	Andy Walker
—	FW	GER	Andreas Thom
—	FW	NED	Pierre van Hooijdonk

=== Left club during season ===
Note: Flags indicate national team as defined under FIFA eligibility rules; some limited exceptions apply. Players may hold more than one non-FIFA nationality.

No.	Pos.	Nation	Player
—	DF	SCO	Jamie McQuilken (to Dundee United)

== Transfers ==
=== Players in ===
Player	From	Date	Fee
(Germany) Andreas Thom	(Germany) Bayer Leverkusen	4 August 1995	£2,200,000
(Scotland) John Hughes	(Scotland) Falkirk	7 August 1995	£380,000
(Scotland) Jackie McNamara	(Scotland) Dunfermline Athletic	4 October 1995	£650,000
(Denmark) Morten Wieghorst	(Scotland) Dundee	8 December 1995	£600,000 (£500,000 plus Barry Smith)
(Portugal) Jorge Cadete	(Portugal) Sporting Lisbon	30 March 1996	Free

=== Players out ===
Player	To	Date	Fee
(Scotland) Charlie Nicholas	(Scotland) Clyde	11 August 1995	Free
(Republic of Ireland) Paul Byrne	(England) Southend United	25 August 1995	£60,000
(England) Tony Mowbray	(England) Ipswich Town	5 October 1995	£300,000
(Scotland) Jamie McQuilken	(Scotland) Dundee United	4 November 1995	£150,000
(Scotland) Barry Smith	(Scotland) Dundee	8 December 1995	Exchange
(Scotland) Mark McNally	(England) Southend United	8 December 1995	£60,000
(Scotland) Willie Falconer	(Scotland) Motherwell	16 January 1996	£200,000
(Scotland) Andy Walker	(England) Sheffield United	23 February 1996	£500,000
(Scotland) Jim Slavin	(Scotland) Partick Thistle	15 March 1996	£30,000
(Scotland) John O'Neill	(England) Bournemouth	29 March 1996	Free
(Scotland) Mike Galloway		31 May 1996	Retired
(England) Lee Martin		31 May 1996	Free
(Albania) Rudi Vata		31 May 1996	Free

== Competitions ==
=== Scottish Premier Division ===
==== League table ====
Pos	Team	Pld	W	D	L	GF	GA	GD	Pts	Qualification or relegation
1	Rangers (C)	36	27	6	3	85	25	+60	87	Qualification for the Champions League qualifying round
2	Celtic	36	24	11	1	74	25	+49	83	Qualification for the UEFA Cup qualifying round (Note: Aberdeen qualified for the UEFA Cup by winning the League Cup.)
3	Aberdeen	36	16	7	13	52	45	+7	55	Qualification for the UEFA Cup qualifying round
4	Heart of Midlothian	36	16	7	13	55	53	+2	55	Qualification for the Cup Winners' Cup qualifying round (Note: As Rangers, the winners of the Scottish Cup, qualified for the Champions League via their league position, the place in the Cup Winners' Cup was passed to the cup runner-up, Heart of Midlothian.)
5	Hibernian	36	11	10	15	43	57	−14	43	

Source: Soccerbase
Rules for classification: 1) Points; 2) Goal difference; 3) Goals scored
(C) Champions

==== Matches ====
26 August 1995 Premier League	Raith Rovers	0–1	Celtic	Kirkcaldy
15:00			Pierre van Hooijdonk	Stadium: Stark's Park; Attendance: 9,300

10 September 1995 Premier League	Aberdeen	2–3	Celtic	Aberdeen
15:00				Stadium: Pittodrie Stadium; Attendance: 16,489

16 September 1995 Premier League	Celtic	1–1	Motherwell	Glasgow
15:00				Stadium: Celtic Park; Attendance: 31,365

23 September 1995 Premier League	Hearts	0–4	Celtic	Edinburgh
15:00				Stadium: Tynecastle Park; Attendance: 13,696

30 September 1995 Premier League	Celtic	0–2	Rangers	Glasgow
15:00				Stadium: Celtic Park; Attendance: 33,296

4 October 1995 Premier League	Falkirk	0–1	Celtic	Falkirk
19:45 GMT		Match Report		Stadium: Brockville Park; Attendance: 9,053

7 October 1995 Premier League	Celtic	2–1	Partick Thistle	Glasgow, Scotland
15:00 GMT		Match Report		Stadium: Celtic Park; Attendance: 29,952

14 October 1995 Premier League	Celtic	2–2	Hibernian	Glasgow
15:00 GMT				Stadium: Celtic Park; Attendance: 31,738

21 October 1995 Premier League	Kilmarnock	0–0	Celtic	Kilmarnock, Scotland
15:00 GMT				Stadium: Rugby Park; Attendance: 14,011

28 October 1995 Premier League	Celtic	2–0	Aberdeen	Glasgow
15:00 GMT				Stadium: Celtic Park; Attendance: 32,275

4 November 1995 Premier League	Motherwell	0–2	Celtic	Motherwell
15:00 GMT				Stadium: Fir Park; Attendance: 12,077

8 November 1995 Premier League	Celtic	0–0	Raith Rovers	Glasgow
19:45 GMT				Stadium: Celtic Park; Attendance: 28,382

11 November 1995 Premier League	Partick Thistle	1–2	Celtic	Glasgow
15:00 GMT				Stadium: Firhill Park; Attendance: 12,223

19 November 1995 Premier League	Rangers	3–3	Celtic	Glasgow
15:00 GMT				Stadium: Ibrox Stadium; Attendance: 46,440

25 November 1995 Premier League	Celtic	3–1	Hearts	Glasgow
15:00 GMT				Stadium: Celtic Park; Attendance: 34,032

2 December 1995 Premier League	Celtic	4–2	Kilmarnock	Glasgow
15:00 GMT				Stadium: Celtic Park; Attendance: 33,660

9 December 1995 Premier League	Hibernian	0–4	Celtic	Edinburgh
15:00 GMT				Stadium: Easter Road; Attendance: 13,626

16 December 1995 Premier League	Celtic	1–0	Falkirk	Glasgow
15:00 GMT				Stadium: Celtic Park; Attendance: 36,466

3 January 1996 Premier League	Celtic	0–0	Rangers	Glasgow
20:00 GMT				Stadium: Celtic Park; Attendance: 36,719

6 January 1996 Premier League	Celtic	1–0	Motherwell	Glasgow
15:00 GMT				Stadium: Celtic Park; Attendance: 34,629

9 January 1996 Premier League	Raith Rovers	1–3	Celtic	Kirkcaldy
19:45 GMT				Stadium: Stark's Park; Attendance: 9,300

14 January 1996 Premier League	Aberdeen	1–2	Celtic	Aberdeen
15:00 GMT				Stadium: Pittordie Stadium; Attendance: 16,760

17 January 1996 Premier League	Hearts	1–2	Celtic	Edinburgh
19:45 GMT				Stadium: Tynecastle Park; Attendance: 15,871

20 January 1996 Premier League	Kilmarnock	0–0	Celtic	Kilmarnock
15:00 GMT				Stadium: Rugby Park; Attendance: 16,101

3 February 1996 Premier League	Celtic	2–0	Hibernian	Glasgow
15:00 GMT				Stadium: Celtic Park; Attendance: 36,976

10 February 1996 Premier League	Falkirk	0–0	Celtic	Falkirk
15:00 GMT				Stadium: Brockville Park; Attendance: 10,366

24 February 1996 Premier League	Celtic	4–0	Partick Thistle	Glasgow
15:00 GMT				Stadium: Celtic Park; Attendance: 36,421

2 March 1996 Premier League	Celtic	4–0	Hearts	Glasgow
15:00 GMT				Stadium: Celtic Park; Attendance: 37,034

17 March 1996 Premier League	Rangers	1–1	Celtic	Glasgow
15:00 GMT				Stadium: Ibrox Stadium; Attendance: 47,312

23 March 1996 Premier League	Motherwell	0–0	Celtic	Motherwell
15:00 GMT				Stadium: Fir Park; Attendance: 12,394

1 April 1996 Premier League	Celtic	5–0	Aberdeen	Glasgow
20:00 GMT				Stadium: Celtic Park; Attendance: 35,284

10 April 1996 Premier League	Celtic	1–1	Kilmarnock	Glasgow
19:45 GMT				Stadium: Celtic Park; Attendance: 36,476

14 April 1996 Premier League	Hibernian	1–2	Celtic	Edinburgh
15:00 GMT				Stadium: Easter Road; Attendance: 10,742

20 April 1996 Premier League	Celtic	4–0	Falkirk	Glasgow
15:00 GMT				Stadium: Celtic Park; Attendance: 35,692

27 April 1996 Premier League	Partick Thistle	2–4	Celtic	Glasgow
15:00 GMT				Stadium: Firhill Park; Attendance: 14,693

4 May 1996 Premier League	Celtic	4–1	Raith Rovers	Glasgow
15:00 GMT				Stadium: Celtic Park; Attendance: 37,318

=== Scottish Cup ===
28 January 1996 Third round	Whitehill Welfare	0–3	Celtic	Edinburgh
15:00 GMT				Stadium: Easter Road; Attendance: 13,313

17 February 1996 Fourth round	Celtic	2–0	Raith Rovers	Glasgow
15:00 GMT				Stadium: Celtic Park; Attendance: 33,415

10 March 1996 Quarter-finals	Celtic	2–1	Dundee United	Glasgow
15:00 GMT	Pierre Van Hooijdonk; Andreas Thom		Owen Coyle	Stadium: Celtic Park; Attendance: 32,750

7 April 1996 Semi-finals	Celtic	1–2	Rangers	Glasgow
20:00 GMT	Pierre Van Hooijdonk		Brian Laudrup; Ally McCoist	Stadium: Hampden Park; Attendance: 36,333

=== Scottish League Cup ===
19 August 1995 Second round	Ayr United	0–3	Celtic	Ayr
20:00 GMT				Stadium: Somerset Park; Attendance: 9,128

31 August 1995 Third round	Celtic	2–1	Raith Rovers	Glasgow
20:00 GMT				Stadium: Celtic Park; Attendance: 27,546

19 September 1995 Quarter Finals	Celtic	0–1	Rangers	Glasgow
20:00 GMT				Stadium: Celtic Park; Attendance: 32,803

=== Cup Winners' Cup ===
14 September 1995 1st round 1st leg	Dinamo Batumi (Georgia (country))	2–3	(Scotland) Celtic	Batumi
18:00	Machutadze 8'; Tugushi 62'	Report	Thom 21', 86'; Boyd 40'	Stadium: Tsentral Stadium; Attendance: 15,200; Referee: Amit Klein (Israel)

28 September 1995 1st round 2nd leg	Celtic (Scotland)	4–0 (7–2 agg.)	(Georgia (country)) Dinamo Batumi	Glasgow
19:45 GMT	Thom 18', 21'; Donnelly 47'; Walker 89'	Report		Stadium: Celtic Park; Attendance: 31,969; Referee: Gylfi Thór Orrason (Iceland)

19 October 1995 2nd round 1st leg	Paris Saint-Germain (France)	1–0	(Scotland) Celtic	Paris
20:30	Djorkaeff 76'	Report		Stadium: Parc des Princes; Attendance: 30,010; Referee: Günter Benkö (Austria)

2 November 1995 2nd round 2nd leg	Celtic (Scotland)	0–3 (0–4 agg.)	(France) Paris Saint-Germain	Glasgow
19:45 GMT		Report	Loko 36', 42'; Nouma 68'	Stadium: Celtic Park; Attendance: 34,822; Referee: Kurt Röthlisberger (Switzerland)
