= 1995–96 in Scottish football =

Premier League champions
- Rangers

Division One champions
- Dunfermline Athletic

Division Two champions
- Stirling Albion

Division Three champions
- Livingston

Scottish Cup winners
- Rangers

League Cup winners
- Aberdeen

Challenge Cup winners
- Stenhousemuir

Junior Cup winners
- Tayport

Teams in Europe
- Celtic, Motherwell, Partick Thistle, Raith Rovers, Rangers

Scotland national team
- UEFA Euro 1996 qualifying, UEFA Euro 1996
- ← 1994–95 1996–97 →

The 1995–96 season was the 99th season of competitive football in Scotland.

== Scottish Premier Division ==
=== Summary ===
Rangers won the Premier Division with a record 87 points, finishing four ahead of rivals Celtic. Aberdeen were third with 55 points (on goal difference).

Falkirk were relegated after finishing bottom. Partick Thistle were relegated via the play-offs, losing 3–2 on aggregate to Dundee United, who returned to the Premier Division at the first attempt. This was the only occasion on which this short-lived play-off system relegated a team from the Premier Division.

Rangers qualified for the European Cup, with Celtic and Aberdeen making it into the UEFA Cup. All three clubs entered at the qualifying round stage.

Celtic's Pierre van Hooijdonk was the top scorer with 26 goals, ahead of the Rangers trio of Gordon Durie (17), Ally McCoist (16) and Paul Gascoigne (14).

Rangers recorded the biggest win of the campaign with a 7–0 home win over Hibernian, with Gordon Durie scoring four times. Incredibly, Hibs had won 1–0 at Ibrox just three months earlier, and Hearts won 3–0 there just three weeks after the 7–0 match.

Celtic went 31 games unbeaten, from 4 October to the end of the season. Motherwell had the best winning run with five consecutive successes, while Falkirk lost eight in a row.

Meadowbank Thistle, who had been relegated from the Second Division, were renamed Livingston to reflect their relocation from Edinburgh to Livingston for this season. The renamed club ended the season as Third Division champions.

=== Table ===
Pos	Team	Pld	W	D	L	GF	GA	GD	Pts	Qualification or relegation
1	Rangers (C)	36	27	6	3	85	25	+60	87	Qualification for the Champions League qualifying round
2	Celtic	36	24	11	1	74	25	+49	83	Qualification for the UEFA Cup qualifying round (Note: Aberdeen qualified for the UEFA Cup by winning the League Cup.)
3	Aberdeen	36	16	7	13	52	45	+7	55	Qualification for the UEFA Cup qualifying round
4	Heart of Midlothian	36	16	7	13	55	53	+2	55	Qualification for the Cup Winners' Cup qualifying round (Note: As Rangers, the winners of the Scottish Cup, qualified for the Champions League via their league position, the place in the Cup Winners' Cup was passed to the cup runner-up, Heart of Midlothian.)
5	Hibernian	36	11	10	15	43	57	−14	43	
6	Raith Rovers	36	12	7	17	41	57	−16	43	
7	Kilmarnock	36	11	8	17	39	54	−15	41	
8	Motherwell	36	9	12	15	28	39	−11	39	
9	Partick Thistle (R)	36	8	6	22	29	62	−33	30	Qualification for the Play-off
10	Falkirk (R)	36	6	6	24	31	60	−29	24	Relegation to the First Division

Source: Soccerbase
Rules for classification: 1) Points; 2) Goal difference; 3) Goals scored
(C) Champions; (R) Relegated
Notes:

Champions: Rangers
Relegated: Partick Thistle, Falkirk

== Scottish League Division One ==
Pos	Team	Pld	W	D	L	GF	GA	GD	Pts	Promotion or relegation
1	Dunfermline Athletic (C, P)	36	21	8	7	73	41	+32	71	Promotion to the Premier Division
2	Dundee United (P)	36	19	10	7	73	37	+36	67	Qualification for the Play-off
3	Greenock Morton	36	20	7	9	57	39	+18	67	
4	St Johnstone	36	19	8	9	60	36	+24	65	
5	Dundee	36	15	12	9	53	40	+13	57	
6	St Mirren	36	13	8	15	46	51	−5	47	
7	Clydebank	36	10	10	16	39	58	−19	40	
8	Airdrieonians	36	9	11	16	43	54	−11	38	
9	Hamilton Academical (R)	36	10	6	20	40	57	−17	36	Relegation to the Second Division
10	Dumbarton (R)	36	3	2	31	23	94	−71	11	Relegation to the Second Division

Source: RSSSF
Rules for classification: 1) points; 2) goal difference; 3) number of goals scored.
(C) Champions; (P) Promoted; (R) Relegated

Promoted: Dunfermline Athletic, Dundee United
Relegated: Hamilton Academical, Dumbarton

== Scottish League Division Two ==
Pos	Team	Pld	W	D	L	GF	GA	GD	Pts	Promotion or relegation
1	Stirling Albion (C, P)	36	24	9	3	83	30	+53	81	Promotion to the First Division
2	East Fife (P)	36	19	10	7	50	29	+21	67	Promotion to the First Division
3	Berwick Rangers	36	18	6	12	64	47	+17	60	
4	Stenhousemuir	36	14	7	15	51	49	+2	49	
5	Clyde	36	11	12	13	47	45	+2	45	
6	Ayr United	36	11	12	13	40	40	0	45	
7	Queen of the South	36	11	10	15	54	67	−13	43	
8	Stranraer	36	8	18	10	38	43	−5	42	
9	Forfar Athletic (R)	36	11	7	18	37	61	−24	40	Relegation to the Third Division
10	Montrose (R)	36	5	5	26	33	86	−53	20	Relegation to the Third Division

Rules for classification: 1) points; 2) goal difference; 3) number of goals scored.
(C) Champions; (P) Promoted; (R) Relegated

Promoted: Stirling Albion, East Fife
Relegated: Forfar Athletic, Montrose

== Scottish League Division Three ==
Pos	Team	Pld	W	D	L	GF	GA	GD	Pts	Promotion
1	Livingston (C, P)	36	21	9	6	51	24	+27	72	Promotion to the Second Division
2	Brechin City (P)	36	18	9	9	41	21	+20	63	Promotion to the Second Division
3	Caledonian Thistle	36	15	12	9	64	38	+26	57	
4	Ross County	36	12	17	7	56	39	+17	53	
5	Arbroath	36	13	13	10	41	41	0	52	
6	Queen's Park	36	12	12	12	40	43	−3	48	
7	East Stirlingshire	36	11	11	14	58	62	−4	44	
8	Cowdenbeath	36	10	8	18	45	59	−14	38	
9	Alloa Athletic	36	6	11	19	26	58	−32	29	
10	Albion Rovers	36	7	8	21	37	74	−37	29	

Source: Soccerway
Rules for classification: 1) points; 2) goal difference; 3) number of goals scored.
(C) Champions; (P) Promoted

Promoted: Livingston, Brechin City

== Other honours ==
=== Cup honours ===
Rangers won the Scottish Cup, beating Hearts 5–1 in the final, with Gordon Durie scoring a second half hat-trick.

The Coca-Cola Cup went to Aberdeen, who beat Dundee 2–0 to win the trophy for the sixth time.

The Challenge Cup was won by Stenhousemuir, who beat Dundee United on penalties after a 0–0 draw. United never conceded a goal in the competition.

Competition	Winner	Score	Runner-up	Report
Scottish Cup 1995–96	Rangers	5 – 1	Heart of Midlothian	Wikipedia article
League Cup 1995–96	Aberdeen	2 – 0	Dundee	Wikipedia article
Challenge Cup 1995–96	Stenhousemuir	0 – 0 (a.e.t.) (5 – 4 pen.)	Dundee United	Wikipedia article
Youth Cup	Celtic	4 – 1	Dundee	
Junior Cup	Tayport	2 – 0 (a.e.t.)	Camelon	

=== Individual honours ===
==== SPFA awards ====
Award	Winner	Club
Players' Player of the Year	(England) Paul Gascoigne	Rangers
Young Player of the Year	(Scotland) Jackie McNamara	Celtic

==== SFWA awards ====
Award	Winner	Club
Footballer of the Year	(England) Paul Gascoigne	Rangers
Manager of the Year	(Scotland) Walter Smith	Rangers

== Scottish clubs in Europe ==
Club	Competition(s)	Final round	Coef.
Rangers	UEFA Champions League	Group stage	5.50
Celtic	UEFA Cup Winners' Cup	Second round	4.00
Raith Rovers	UEFA Cup	Second round	3.50
Motherwell	UEFA Cup	Preliminary round	1.00

Average coefficient - 3.500

== Scotland national team ==
Scotland recorded home wins over Greece, Finland and San Marino between August and November in the European Championship qualifiers to secure qualification, keeping a clean sheet in each match. The final three friendly matches before Euro 96 were lost, including two just two weeks before the first match.

In the competition, Scotland battled to a 0–0 draw in the opener against the Netherlands at Villa Park. They were then beaten 2–0 at Wembley by hosts England in the second group match. During this match Gary McAllister had a penalty kick saved by David Seaman when the score was 1–0 to England. Moments later, Paul Gascoigne scored one of the great Wembley goals to make the score 2–0 and effectively win the match.

Going into the final match at Villa Park, Scotland had to beat Switzerland and hope that England beat the Netherlands, while also needing a five-goal swing in their favour. A goal by Ally McCoist put Scotland on their way to a 1–0 victory and with England leading 4–0 against the Dutch, Scotland were going through. But Patrick Kluivert scored a 78th-minute goal against England, which was enough to send Craig Brown's squad out of the tournament on goals scored (goal difference was tied).

Date	Venue	Opponents	Score	Competition	Scotland scorer(s)
16 August 1995	Hampden Park, Glasgow (H)	Greece	1–0	ECQG8	Ally McCoist
6 September 1995	Hampden Park, Glasgow (H)	Finland	1–0	ECQG8	Scott Booth
11 October 1995	Råsunda Stadium, Stockholm (A)	Sweden	0–2	Friendly	
15 November 1995	Hampden Park, Glasgow (H)	San Marino	5–0	ECQG8	Eoin Jess, Scott Booth, Ally McCoist, Pat Nevin, own goal
27 March 1996	Hampden Park, Glasgow (H)	Australia	1–0	Friendly	Ally McCoist
24 April 1996	Parken Stadium, Copenhagen (A)	Denmark	0–2	Friendly	
26 May 1996	Veteran's Stadium, New Britain, Connecticut (A)	(United States) USA	1–2	Friendly	Gordon Durie
29 May 1996	Orange Bowl, Miami, Florida (A)	Colombia	0–1	Friendly	
10 June 1996	Villa Park, Birmingham (N)	Netherlands	0–0	ECGA	
15 June 1996	Wembley Stadium, London (N)	England	0–2	ECGA	
18 June 1996	Villa Park, Birmingham (N)	Switzerland	1–0	ECGA	Ally McCoist

Key:

- (H) = Home match
- (A) = Away match
- ECQ8 = European Championship qualifying - Group 8
- ECGA = European Championship - Group A
