= 1996 Scottish Cup final =

1996 Scottish Cup Final
- Event: 1995–96 Scottish Cup
Rangers	Heart of Midlothian
5	1
- Date: 18 May 1996
- Venue: Hampden Park, Glasgow
- Man of the Match: Brian Laudrup
- Referee: Hugh Dallas
- Attendance: 37,730

The 1996 Scottish Cup Final sponsored by Tennents was played on 18 May 1996, at Hampden Park in Glasgow and was the final of the 111th Scottish Cup. Rangers and Hearts contested the match, Rangers won the match 5–1, thanks to a Gordon Durie hat-trick and a Brian Laudrup brace.

== Match summary ==
In the first half Laudrup put Rangers ahead with a low right foot shot into the left corner of the net after a high pass through from Gordon Durie. The second goal came in the fiftieth minute when Laudrup hit a low left footed cross in from the right which Hearts' goalkeeper Gilles Rousset allowed to slip through his hands and under his legs and into the net at the near post. Durie then put Rangers three nil up after he volleyed home with the outside of his right foot after a left wing cross by Laudrup. Colquhoun then pulled a goal back for Hearts with eleven minutes remaining with a low shot, before Durie restored Rangers' three-goal lead a minute later with a right foot shot over the goalkeeper from a Laudrup pass. Durie then completed his hat-trick with a header again from a Laudrup cross from the right. Because of his two goals and overall performance, the final has since become known as the Laudrup Final.

The same teams would contest the 1996 Scottish League Cup Final in November, again won by Rangers, and would meet again in the 1998 Scottish Cup Final with Hearts the victors.

== Match details ==
18 May 1996

Rangers	5 – 1	Heart of Midlothian
Laudrup 37', 50'; Durie 66', 80', 85'	Report	Colquhoun 79'

Hampden Park, Glasgow
Attendance: 37,730
Referee: Hugh Dallas

RANGERS:
GK	1	(Scotland) Andy Goram
DF	2	(Scotland) Alex Cleland
DF	3	(Scotland) David Robertson
DF	4	(Scotland) Richard Gough (c)
DF	5	(Scotland) Alan McLaren
DF	6	(Scotland) John Brown
MF	8	(England) Paul Gascoigne
MF	9	(Scotland) Ian Ferguson	(substituted off) 88'
MF	10	(Scotland) Stuart McCall
FW	7	(Scotland) Gordon Durie
FW	11	(Denmark) Brian Laudrup
Substitutes:
DF		(Federal Republic of Yugoslavia) Gordan Petrić
MF	14	(Scotland) Ian Durrant	(substituted in) 88'
FW		(Denmark) Erik Bo Andersen
Manager:
(Scotland) Walter Smith

HEARTS:
GK	1	(France) Gilles Rousset
DF	5	(Scotland) Dave McPherson
DF	4	(Scotland) Allan McManus
DF	6	(Italy) Pasquale Bruno	(substituted off) 58'
DF	3	(Scotland) Paul Ritchie
DF	11	(England) Neil Pointon
MF	2	(Scotland) Gary Locke (c)	(substituted off) 8'
MF	8	(Scotland) Gary Mackay
MF	10	(Scotland) Steve Fulton
FW	7	(Scotland) Allan Johnston
FW	9	(Scotland) John Colquhoun
Substitutes:
GK		(Scotland) Myles Hogarth
FW	15	(Scotland) John Robertson	(substituted in) 58'
FW	12	(Scotland) Alan Lawrence	(substituted in) 8'
Manager:
(Scotland) Jim Jefferies
