= 1998 Scottish Cup final =

1998 Scottish Cup Final
- Event: 1997–98 Scottish Cup
Heart of Midlothian	Rangers
2	1
- Date: 16 May 1998
- Venue: Celtic Park, Glasgow
- Man of the Match: Gilles Rousset
- Referee: Willie Young
- Attendance: 48,946

The 1998 Scottish Cup Final was played on 16 May 1998 at Celtic Park in Glasgow and was the final of the 113th Scottish Cup. Heart of Midlothian and Rangers contested the match which Hearts won 2–1, thanks to Colin Cameron's early penalty and Stephane Adam's goal.

The match was also notable as Ally McCoist's last game for Rangers; he went on to score their goal after coming on as a substitute. It was the end of an era for one of the Glasgow club's most successful squads, who had won a record-equalling nine consecutive league titles but finished the 1997–98 season empty-handed, losing the cup final a week after their run of championships was ended by arch-rivals Celtic; in addition to McCoist, it was the last Rangers appearance for a number of their older players including Goram, McCall, Durrant, Gough and Laudrup and the manager Walter Smith, although several would return to the club in another capacity in the years to follow.

There was an element of revenge for Hearts in the victory, as they had recently lost to Rangers in both the 1996 Scottish Cup Final and the 1996 Scottish League Cup Final. John Robertson was an unused substitute in the match, which was his last involvement as a player with the club. Gary Locke, Hearts club captain, did not play in the final due to injury.

Hampden Park, the usual venue, was being rebuilt: its next game would be the 1999 Scottish Cup Final.

== Match details ==
16 May 1998

Heart of Midlothian	2–1	Rangers
Cameron 2' (pen.); Adam 52'	Report	McCoist 81'

Celtic Park, Glasgow
Attendance: 48,946
Referee: Willie Young

HEART OF MIDLOTHIAN:
GK	1	(France) Gilles Rousset
DF	2	(Scotland) Dave McPherson
DF	4	(Scotland) David Weir
DF	5	(Scotland) Paul Ritchie
DF	3	(Scotland) Gary Naysmith
MF	6	(Italy) Stefano Salvatori
MF	7	(Scotland) Neil McCann
MF	8	(Scotland) Steve Fulton (c)
MF	10	(Scotland) Colin Cameron
MF	11	(Austria) Thomas Flögel
FW	9	(France) Stéphane Adam	(substituted off) 78'
Substitutes:
DF		(Scotland) Grant Murray
FW		(Scotland) John Robertson
FW		(Scotland) Jim Hamilton	(substituted in) 78'
Manager:
(Scotland) Jim Jefferies

RANGERS:
GK	1	(Scotland) Andy Goram
DF	2	(Italy) Sergio Porrini
DF	5	(Italy) Lorenzo Amoruso
DF	4	(Scotland) Richard Gough (c)
DF	6	(Sweden) Joachim Björklund
DF	3	(Norway) Ståle Stensaas	(substituted off) 45'
MF	7	(Italy) Gennaro Gattuso
MF	8	(Scotland) Ian Ferguson
MF	10	(Scotland) Stuart McCall	(substituted off) 68'
FW	9	(Scotland) Gordon Durie
FW	11	(Denmark) Brian Laudrup
Substitutes:
DF	15	(Australia) Craig Moore
MF	17	(Scotland) Ian Durrant	(substituted in) 68'
FW	16	(Scotland) Ally McCoist	(substituted in) 45'
Manager:
(Scotland) Walter Smith
