= 1995–96 Scottish Premier Division =

90th season of top-tier football league in Scotland

Scottish Premier Division
- Season: 1995–96
- Dates: 26 August 1995 – 4 May 1996
- Champions: Rangers; 11th Premier Division title 46th Scottish title
- Relegated: Falkirk; Partick Thistle
- Champions League: Rangers
- UEFA Cup: Celtic; Aberdeen
- Cup Winners' Cup: Heart of Midlothian
- Goals: 477
- Average goals/game: 2.65
- Top goalscorer: Pierre van Hooijdonk (26)
- Biggest home win: Rangers 7–0 Hibernian (30 Dec)
- Biggest away win: Heart of Midlothian 0–4 Celtic (23 Sep); Partick Thistle 0–4 Rangers (14 Oct); Hibernian 0–4 Celtic (9 Dec); Falkirk 0–4 Rangers (6 Jan)
- Highest attendance: 47,312, Rangers 1–1 Celtic (17 Mar)
- Lowest attendance: 2,320, Partick Thistle 0–3 Raith Rovers (3 Mar)
- Average attendance: 15,035

The 1995–96 Scottish Premier Division season was the second season involving a relegation playoff with the Scottish First Division. The season began on 26 August 1995.

== Overview ==
The 1995–96 Scottish Premier Division season ended in success for Rangers who won the title by four points from nearest rivals Celtic to clinch eight titles in a row, despite Celtic losing only one league match in the entire season. Falkirk were relegated to the First Division after finishing bottom with Partick Thistle also being relegated after losing the relegation playoff to Dundee United. As champions, Rangers qualified for the Champions League while Celtic were joined by third-placed Aberdeen in qualifying for the UEFA Cup. Fourth-placed Hearts qualified for the Cup Winners' Cup as Scottish Cup runners-up.

The season began on 26 August with the first goal of the season scored by Aberdeen's John Inglis as they won 3–2 away to Falkirk. The regular league season ended on 4 May with Hibernian's Darren Jackson netting a late winner in a 1–0 win at home to Partick Thistle to claim the final goal of the season.

== Clubs ==
=== Promotion and relegation from 1994–95 ===
Promoted from First Division to Premier League

- Raith Rovers

Relegated from Premier Division to First Division

- Dundee United

=== Stadia and locations ===
Location of clubs in the 1995–96 Scottish Premier Division

Team	Location	Stadium
Aberdeen	Aberdeen	Pittodrie Stadium
Celtic	Parkhead, Glasgow	Celtic Park
Falkirk	Falkirk	Brockville Park
Heart of Midlothian	Gorgie, Edinburgh	Tynecastle Park
Hibernian	Leith, Edinburgh	Easter Road
Kilmarnock	Kilmarnock	Rugby Park
Motherwell	Motherwell	Fir Park
Partick Thistle	Maryhill, Glasgow	Firhill Stadium
Raith Rovers	Kirkcaldy	Stark's Park
Rangers	Ibrox, Glasgow	Ibrox Park

=== Managers ===
Team	Manager
Aberdeen	(Scotland) Roy Aitken
Celtic	(Scotland) Tommy Burns
Falkirk	(Scotland) Eamonn Bannon
Heart of Midlothian	(Scotland) Jim Jefferies
Hibernian	(Scotland) Alex Miller
Kilmarnock	(Scotland) Alex Totten
Motherwell	(Scotland) Alex McLeish
Partick Thistle	(Scotland) Murdo MacLeod
Raith Rovers	(Scotland) Jimmy Thomson
Rangers	(Scotland) Walter Smith

==== Managerial changes ====
Team	Outgoing manager	Date of vacancy	Manner of departure	Incoming manager	Date of appointment
Heart of Midlothian	(Scotland) Tommy McLean	21 July 1995	Sacked	(Scotland) Jim Jefferies	4 August 1995
Falkirk	(Scotland) Jim Jefferies	4 August 1995	Signed by Heart of Midlothian	(Scotland) John Lambie	August 1995
Partick Thistle	(Scotland) John Lambie	August 1995	Signed by Falkirk	(Scotland) Murdo MacLeod	August 1995
Raith Rovers	(Northern Ireland) Jimmy Nicholl	February 1996	Signed by Millwall	(Scotland) Jimmy Thomson	February 1996
Falkirk	(Scotland) John Lambie	16 March 1996	Resigned	(Scotland) Eamonn Bannon	May 1996

== Events ==
- 14 October: Gordon Durie hits the first hat-trick of the season in a 4–0 win at Partick Thistle.
- 28 April: Rangers win the title at Ibrox as a Paul Gascoigne hat-trick helps them to a 3–1 win over Aberdeen.

== League table ==
Pos	Team	Pld	W	D	L	GF	GA	GD	Pts	Qualification or relegation
1	Rangers (C)	36	27	6	3	85	25	+60	87	Qualification for the Champions League qualifying round
2	Celtic	36	24	11	1	74	25	+49	83	Qualification for the UEFA Cup qualifying round (Note: Aberdeen qualified for the UEFA Cup by winning the League Cup.)
3	Aberdeen	36	16	7	13	52	45	+7	55	Qualification for the UEFA Cup qualifying round
4	Heart of Midlothian	36	16	7	13	55	53	+2	55	Qualification for the Cup Winners' Cup qualifying round (Note: As Rangers, the winners of the Scottish Cup, qualified for the Champions League via their league position, the place in the Cup Winners' Cup was passed to the cup runner-up, Heart of Midlothian.)
5	Hibernian	36	11	10	15	43	57	−14	43	
6	Raith Rovers	36	12	7	17	41	57	−16	43	
7	Kilmarnock	36	11	8	17	39	54	−15	41	
8	Motherwell	36	9	12	15	28	39	−11	39	
9	Partick Thistle (R)	36	8	6	22	29	62	−33	30	Qualification for the Play-off
10	Falkirk (R)	36	6	6	24	31	60	−29	24	Relegation to the First Division

Source: Soccerbase
Rules for classification: 1) Points; 2) Goal difference; 3) Goals scored
(C) Champions; (R) Relegated

== Results ==
=== Matches 1–18 ===
During matches 1–18 each team plays every other team twice (home and away).

Home \ Away	ABE	CEL	FAL	HOM	HIB	KIL	MOT	PAR	RAI	RAN
Aberdeen		2–3	3–1	1–2	1–2	4–1	1–0	3–0	3–0	0–1
Celtic	2–0		1–0	3–1	2–2	4–2	1–1	2–1	0–0	0–2
Falkirk	2–3	0–1		2–0	2–0	0–2	0–0	0–1	2–1	0–2
Heart of Midlothian	1–2	0–4	4–1		2–1	2–1	1–1	3–0	4–2	0–2
Hibernian	1–1	0–4	2–1	2–2		2–0	4–2	3–0	1–2	1–4
Kilmarnock	1–2	0–0	4–0	3–1	0–3		1–1	2–1	5–1	0–2
Motherwell	2–1	0–2	1–1	0–0	0–2	3–0		1–1	0–2	0–0
Partick Thistle	1–0	1–2	1–1	2–0	1–1	1–1	1–0		0–2	0–4
Raith Rovers	1–0	0–1	0–1	1–1	3–0	2–0	0–0	3–1		2–2
Rangers	1–1	3–3	2–0	4–1	0–1	1–0	2–1	1–0	4–0	

Source: Soccerbot
Legend: Blue = home team win; Yellow = draw; Red = away team win.

=== Matches 19–36 ===
During matches 19–36 each team plays every other team a further two times (home and away).

Home \ Away	ABE	CEL	FAL	HOM	HIB	KIL	MOT	PAR	RAI	RAN
Aberdeen		1–2	2–1	1–1	2–1	3–0	2–1	1–0	1–0	0–1
Celtic	5–0		4–0	4–0	2–1	1–1	1–0	4–0	4–1	0–0
Falkirk	1–1	0–0		0–2	1–1	4–2	0–1	1–2	2–3	0–4
Heart of Midlothian	1–3	1–2	2–1		1–1	1–0	4–0	2–5	2–0	2–0
Hibernian	1–2	1–2	2–1	2–1		1–1	0–0	1–0	1–1	0–2
Kilmarnock	1–1	0–0	1–0	0–2	3–2		0–1	2–1	2–0	0–3
Motherwell	1–0	0–0	1–0	1–1	3–0	0–1		0–2	1–0	1–3
Partick Thistle	1–1	2–4	0–3	0–1	0–0	0–1	0–2		0–3	1–2
Raith Rovers	2–2	1–3	1–0	1–3	1–0	1–1	2–0	0–2		2–4
Rangers	3–1	1–1	3–2	0–3	7–0	3–0	3–2	5–0	4–0	

Source: Soccerbot
Legend: Blue = home team win; Yellow = draw; Red = away team win.

== Play-off ==
A two leg play-off took place between the 9th placed team in the Premier Division (Partick Thistle) and the runner-up of the First Division (Dundee United) for a place in the 1996–97 Scottish Premier Division.

The first leg at Firhill Stadium finished 1–1 and the second leg at Tannadice Park four days later also finished 1–1 after 90 minutes, meaning extra time was required to separate the teams. Owen Coyle scored for Dundee United during extra time, meaning Dundee United won 3–2 on aggregate, and returned to the Premier Division and Partick Thistle were relegated to the First Division.

== Top scorers ==
Player	Goals	Team
(Netherlands) Pierre van Hooijdonk	26	Celtic
(Scotland) Gordon Durie	17	Rangers
(Scotland) Ally McCoist	16	Rangers
(England) Paul Gascoigne	14	Rangers
(Scotland) Paul Wright	13	Kilmarnock
(Scotland) John Collins	11	Celtic
(Scotland) John Robertson	11	Heart of Midlothian
(Scotland) Darren Jackson	10	Hibernian
(Scotland) Colin Cameron	10	Raith Rovers
(Scotland) Scott Booth	9	Aberdeen
(Scotland) Joe Miller	9	Aberdeen
(Scotland) Keith Wright	9	Hibernian

Source: Soccerbot

== Awards ==
- Player awards

Award	Winner	Club
PFA Players' Player of the Year	(England) Paul Gascoigne	Rangers
PFA Young Player of the Year	(Scotland) Jackie McNamara	Celtic
SFWA Footballer of the Year	(England) Paul Gascoigne	Rangers

- Manager awards

Award	Winner	Club
SFWA Manager of the Year	(Scotland) Walter Smith	Rangers

== Attendances ==
#	Football club	Home games	Average attendance
1	Rangers FC	18	44,661
2	Celtic FC	18	34,342
3	Aberdeen FC	18	12,764
4	Heart of Midlothian	18	12,077
5	Hibernian FC	18	9,842
6	Kilmarnock FC	18	8,719
7	Motherwell FC	18	7,222
8	Partick Thistle	18	6,458
9	Falkirk FC	18	5,885
10	Raith Rovers	18	5,784

== See also ==
- Nine in a row
