= 1996 Scottish League Cup final =

- Event: 1996–97 Scottish League Cup
| Rangers | Heart of Midlothian |
| 4 | 3 |
- Date: 24 November 1996
- Venue: Celtic Park, Glasgow
- Man of the Match: Paul Gascoigne
- Referee: Hugh Dallas (Motherwell)
- Attendance: 48,559

The 1996 Scottish League Cup final was a football match played at Celtic Park, Glasgow, on 24 November 1996. It was the final of the 51st Scottish League Cup competition. The final was contested by Rangers and Heart of Midlothian, who had also been the participants in the 1996 Scottish Cup Final in May of that year.

Rangers won the match 4–3 thanks to two goals each by Ally McCoist and Paul Gascoigne; Steve Fulton, John Robertson and David Weir scored for Hearts.

== Match details ==
24 November 1996

| Rangers | 4–3 | Heart of Midlothian |
|---|---|---|
| McCoist 11', 27'; Gascoigne 64', 66' | Report | Fulton 44'; Robertson 59'; Weir 90' |

Celtic Park, Glasgow
Attendance: 48,559
Referee: Hugh Dallas (Motherwell)

| GK | 1 | (Scotland) Andy Goram |
| DF | 2 | (Scotland) Alec Cleland | | (substituted off) 46' |
| DF | 3 | (Australia) Craig Moore | Booked |
| DF | 4 | (Scotland) Richard Gough (c) |
| DF | 5 | (Federal Republic of Yugoslavia) Gordan Petrić | Booked |
| DF | 6 | (Sweden) Joachim Björklund | Booked |
| MF | 7 | (Scotland) Charlie Miller | Booked |
| MF | 8 | (England) Paul Gascoigne |
| FW | 9 | (Scotland) Ally McCoist |
| MF | 10 | (Germany) Jörg Albertz |
| FW | 11 | (Denmark) Brian Laudrup | Booked |
Substitutes:
| DF | 12 | (Scotland) David Robertson | | (substituted on) 46' |
| GK | 13 | (Netherlands) Theo Snelders |
| FW | 14 | (Netherlands) Peter van Vossen |
Manager:
(Scotland) Walter Smith

| GK | 1 | (France) Gilles Rousset |
| DF | 2 | (Scotland) David Weir |
| DF | 3 | (England) Neil Pointon |
| MF | 4 | (Scotland) Gary Mackay (c) |
| DF | 5 | (Scotland) Paul Ritchie |
| DF | 6 | (Italy) Pasquale Bruno | Booked |
| MF | 7 | (France) Stéphane Paille | | (substituted off) 78' |
| MF | 8 | (Scotland) Steve Fulton |
| FW | 9 | (Scotland) John Robertson |
| MF | 10 | (Scotland) Colin Cameron |
| MF | 11 | (Scotland) Neil McCann |
Substitutes:
| MF | 12 | (Wales) Jeremy Goss |
| FW | 13 | (England) Darren Beckford | | (substituted on) 78' |
| DF | 14 | (Scotland) Allan McManus |
Manager:
(Scotland) Jim Jefferies
