= Hans Eskilsson =

Swedish footballer (born 1966)

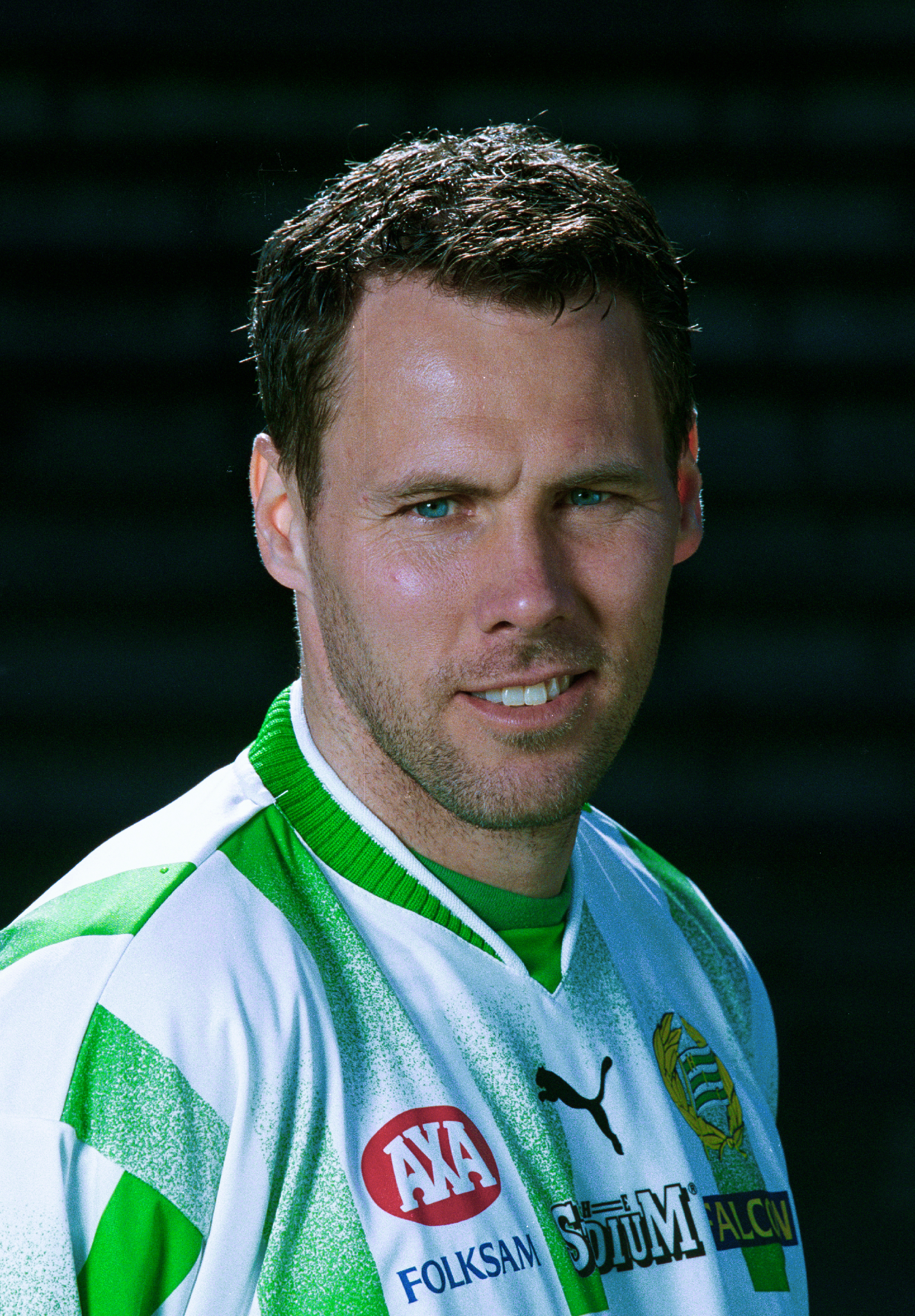

Personal information
- Full name: Hans Vimmo Eskilsson
- Date of birth: 23 January 1966 (age 60)
- Place of birth: Östersund, Sweden
- Height: 1.83 m (6 ft 0 in)
- Positions: Striker; defender

Youth career
- 1973–1975: Ope IF
- 1976–1983: IFK Östersund

Senior career*
| Years | Team | Apps | (Gls) |
| 1983–1984 | IFK Östersund | 28 | (20) |
| 1985–1987 | IFK Norrköping | 57 | (7) |
| 1988 | Hammarby IF | 15 | (1) |
| 1988–1989 | Sporting CP | 7 | (1) |
| 1989–1990 | Braga | 22 | (2) |
| 1991 | AIK | 12 | (1) |
| 1991 | Estoril | 4 | (0) |
| 1992–1995 | Hammarby IF | 73 | (47) |
| 1995 | Vasalund | 10 | (8) |
| 1995–1996 | Hearts | 11 | (2) |
| 1996–2001 | Hammarby IF | 97 | (11) |
| 2002–2003 | Östersunds FK | 5 | (0) |
| Total | | 341 | (100) |

International career
| 1986–1988 | Sweden U21/O | 16 | (3) |
| 1988–1990 | Sweden | 8 | (2) |

Managerial career
- 2002–2003: Östersunds FK
- 2004: Enköping
- * Club domestic league appearances and goals

Hans Vimmo Eskilsson (born 23 January 1966) is a Swedish former professional footballer who played as a striker and defender. Starting off his career with IFK Östersund, he went on to represent clubs such as IFK Norrköping, Hammarby IF, Sporting CP, Braga, AIK, and Hearts during a career that spanned between 1983 and 2003. A full international between 1988 and 1990, he won eight caps for the Sweden national team and scored two goals. He was a part of the Sweden Olympic team that competed at the 1988 Summer Olympics.

== Club career ==
=== Early years and Portugal ===
Eskilsson was born in Östersund, Jämtland County. After starting in the lower leagues with local IFK Östersund, he moved in 1985 to the top division with IFK Norrköping, then competed in the 1988 season with fellow league side Hammarby IF.

Eskilsson moved to Portugal at the age of 22, joining Sporting CP as an electoral asset of future president Jorge Gonçalves: during the better part of the following three seasons in the country – with a brief spell in his country with AIK Fotboll in between– he only scored three goals for as many teams, also representing S.C. Braga and G.D. Estoril Praia.

=== Hammarby IF and Hearts ===
In 1992 Eskilsson returned to former club Hammarby, netting 40 goals in his first two campaigns combined and promoting to the top level in the second. In early November 1995, after a short stint at Solna-based Vasalunds IF, he moved to Scotland to play for Heart of Midlothian in the Premier Division, being sparingly played during the season and being released as his contract was not renewed.

Aged 30, Eskilsson joined Hammarby for a third spell in 1996, finding the side in the second tier and again helping it achieve promotion. He also began featuring regularly as a central defender, forming an efficient partnership with Pétur Marteinsson; late into his final stint, however, he suffered a severe leg injury after a two-footed challenge by Daniel Hoch in a derby game against AIK, having to retire from professional football.

== International career ==
Eskilsson gained eight caps for Sweden during two years, his debut coming in 1988. Also in that year, he played Olympic football in Seoul, appearing in two matches for the eventual quarter-finalists.

== Post-retirement ==
Shortly after retiring, Eskilsson had a short spell as a manager, coaching the then lower division clubs Östersunds FK and Enköpings SK. He subsequently became a professional poker player. He has over $150,000 in live earnings.

Eskilsson is married to Swedish international footballer Malin Swedberg, and the couple have two children, including Williot Swedberg who is also a professional football player.

== Career statistics ==
=== International ===
Appearances and goals by national team and year
| National team | Year | Apps | Goals |
|---|---|---|---|
| Sweden | 1988 | 6 | 2 |
| Sweden | 1989 | 0 | 0 |
| Sweden | 1990 | 2 | 0 |
| Total | | 8 | 2 |

International goals

Scores and results list Sweden's goal tally first.

| # | Date | Venue | Opponent | Score | Result | Competition | Ref |
|---|---|---|---|---|---|---|---|
| 1. | 2 April 1988 | Olympiastadion, West Berlin, West Germany | Soviet Union | 1–0 | 2–0 | 1988 Four Nations Tournament | |
| 2. | 27 April 1988 | Råsunda, Solna, Sweden | Wales | 4–1 | 4–1 | Friendly | |
