= Jim Slavin =

Scottish footballer

Personal information
- Full name: James Slavin
- Date of birth: January 18, 1975 (age 51)
- Place of birth: Lanark, Scotland
- Height: 6 ft 2 in (1.88 m)
- Position: Central defender

Youth career
- Giffnock North
- Celtic

Senior career*
Years	Team	Apps	(Gls)
1992–1996	Celtic	3	(0)
1996–1998	Partick Thistle	26	(0)
1998	Ross County	0	(0)
- Wishaw Juniors
Total		29	(0)
- * Club domestic league appearances and goals

James Slavin (born 18 January 1975) is a Scottish retired footballer who played as a central defender. He began his senior career with Celtic, having joining the club at youth level from Giffnock North. He made his debut against Dundee United in January 1995 and made two further first team appearances, both within the next week. He was transferred by Celtic to Partick Thistle in March 1996 for a £30,000 fee, where he went on to make 26 Scottish Football League appearances. He left Partick in 1998 and was briefly with Ross County without appearing for their first team. He subsequently played in junior football with Wishaw Juniors.
