= Andrew Dow =

American football player and coach (1892–1970)

Biographical details
- Born: January 2, 1892
- Died: 1970

Playing career
- 1909–1911: Omaha

Coaching career (HC unless noted)
- 1913–1914: Omaha

Head coaching record
- Overall: 0–7

Andrew Dow (January 2, 1892 – 1970) was an American college football player and coach. He served as the head football coach at the University of Omaha—now known as the University of Nebraska at Omaha—from 1913 to 1914, compiling a record of 0–7. He later worked as a pediatrician in Omaha.

== Head coaching record ==
Year	Team	Overall	Conference	Standing	Bowl/playoffs
Omaha Cardinals (Independent) (1913–1914)
1913	Omaha	0–4			
1914	Omaha	0–3			
Omaha:		0–7			
Total:		0–7			
