= David Murie =

Scottish footballer

Personal information
- Date of birth: 21 August 1976 (age 50)
- Place of birth: Edinburgh, Scotland
- Position: Full-back

Youth career
- 1992–1996: Heart of Midlothian

Senior career*
Years	Team	Apps	(Gls)
1996–1999	Heart of Midlothian	12	(0)
1999–2001	Greenock Morton	71	(3)
2001–2006	Berwick Rangers	169	(0)
2006–2007	Stenhousemuir	16	(0)
2007–2010	Brechin City	53	(1)
2010–2011	Newtongrange Star		
2011– ????	Coldstream		
- * Club domestic league appearances and goals

David Murie (born 21 August 1976) is a Scottish former footballer

== Career ==
Murie started his career through the youth teams at Scottish Premier League side Heart of Midlothian, playing as a full-back. Murie left the club at 23 to join Scottish Football League First Division side Greenock Morton, after making a dozen appearances in the SPL.

After leaving Morton in 2001, Murie dropped through the leagues with Berwick Rangers, Stenhousemuir and Brechin City, before ending up in the juniors with Newtongrange Star and now playing for Coldstream in the Scottish Borders

== Outside of football ==
Married Murie works as a warden in the prison service.
