= Jimmy Thomson (footballer, born 1937) =

Scottish footballer and manager

Personal information
- Date of birth: 10 April 1937
- Date of death: 4 August 2012 (aged 75)
- Position: Wing half

Youth career
- Valleyfield Colliery

Senior career*
Years	Team	Apps	(Gls)
1956–1961	St Mirren	42	(0)
1961–1971	Dunfermline Athletic	218	(4)
1971–1972	Raith Rovers	11	(0)
Total		271	(4)

Managerial career
- 1975: Dunfermline Athletic (caretaker)
- 1982: Dunfermline Athletic (caretaker)
- 1987–1988: Berwick Rangers
- 1996: Raith Rovers
- 1996–1997: Berwick Rangers
- * Club domestic league appearances and goals

Jimmy Thomson (10 April 1937 – 4 August 2012) was a Scottish football player and manager. He played for St Mirren, Dunfermline Athletic and Raith Rovers, and then managed Scottish Football League clubs Berwick Rangers and Raith Rovers. Thomson was one of four Raith managers in the space of fourteen months following Jimmy Nicholl's move to Millwall in 1996. Thomson also served Raith's Fife rivals Dunfermline Athletic as caretaker manager in two different spells.
