= Pasquale Bruno =

Italian footballer (born 1962)

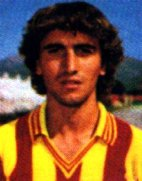
- Bruno with Lecce in the early 80s

Personal information
- Full name: Pasquale Bruno
- Date of birth: 19 June 1962 (age 64)
- Place of birth: Lecce, Italy
- Height: 1.81 m (5 ft 11 in)
- Position: Defender

Youth career
- Lecce

Senior career*
Years	Team	Apps	(Gls)
1979–1983	Lecce	111	(9)
1983–1987	Como	109	(2)
1987–1990	Juventus	67	(1)
1990–1993	Torino	74	(1)
1993–1994	Fiorentina	19	(0)
1994–1995	Lecce	17	(3)
1995–1997	Heart of Midlothian	35	(1)
1997	Wigan Athletic	1	(0)
1998	Cowdenbeath	1	(0)
Total		434	(17)

International career
1981	Italy U20	2	(0)
1981	Italy B U21	1	(2)
1987–1988	Italy Olympic	2	(0)
- * Club domestic league appearances and goals

Pasquale Bruno (born 19 June 1962) is an Italian football commentator and former professional footballer who played as a defender. He is remembered for being one of the toughest players in the history of Italian football.

Throughout his career, he made a name for himself as an aggressive, physical, and hard-tackling player, with a tendency to commit fouls and pick up cards, often attracting criticism and controversy, and earning the nickname O' animale (lit. 'The Animal'), due to his tenacious style of play; in total, he received an Italian record of over fifty days of suspension throughout his career. Bruno played for several Italian clubs throughout his career, in particular Juventus, where he won a Coppa Italia-UEFA Cup double in 1990, and subsequently for the club's inter-city rivals Torino, where he won another Coppa Italia in 1993; he also had stints with Lecce, Como and Fiorentina. Following his time in Italy, he ended his career after spells in Scotland and England with Heart of Midlothian, Wigan Athletic, and Cowdenbeath. He currently works as a football analyst for Italian television.

== Club career ==
Bruno started his career with his home-town side U.S. Lecce in 1979. The defender moved north to Como in 1983, and then four years later joined Juventus in 1987. Although his time with the Bianconeri was predominantly disappointing, due to the club's crisis following the retirement of legend Michel Platini, he won a UEFA Cup medal during the 1989–90 season, under manager Dino Zoff, as Juventus defeated Italian rivals Fiorentina in the 1990 UEFA Cup Final, and a Coppa Italia winners medal the same season, defeating Milan in the final. Although Bruno often declared that he had not formed friendships with footballers, partially due to his combative style of play and aggressive behaviour, he notably formed a close friendship with team-mate Ian Rush during his time at the club.

In 1990 Bruno joined Juve's fierce cross-city rivals Torino; despite initially being disliked by the fans, due to his past with Torino's bitter rivals Juventus, he soon became a club favourite, due to his tenacious, determined style of play, and due to his dedication and leadership. During his time at Torino, he won the Mitropa Cup in 1991, and he added another Coppa Italia medal during the 1992–93 season, knocking out his former club in the semi-finals of the tournament. The previous season he had played in his second UEFA Cup final, although on this occasion he tasted defeat as Ajax Amsterdam defeated Torino on the "away goals" rule. During his time at Torino, he attracted particular controversy in the first leg of the Turin Derby during the 1991–92 Serie A season, on 17 November 1991; after being sent-off for a double booking, Bruno refused to leave the pitch, berating and threatening the referee in protest, and needed to be restrained by his team-mates. As a result, he received a record eight-match ban for his offences.

Bruno joined Serie B side Fiorentina for the 1993–94 Serie B season, helping the team to win the Serie B title and reclaim Serie A promotion, but he remained in Serie B the following year, as a result of his transfer back to Lecce, spending a season with the club before concluding his footballing career in Italy.

Bruno left Italy in the summer of 1995, eventually joining Scottish side Hearts in November. He spent two seasons with the Edinburgh club, helping them to reach the 1996 Scottish Cup Final and the 1996 Scottish League Cup Final, both of which were lost to Rangers. Bruno left for English club Wigan in 1997 but only played 45 minutes for the Lancashire side. He also made one appearance for Cowdenbeath in 1998 under Craig Levein before retiring.

== Style of play ==
A strong, versatile, tenacious, yet controversial player, Bruno was capable of playing anywhere in defence, although he was most frequently deployed as a full-back, or also as a centre-back. Although he did not possess good technical ability, he was known for his physicality, man-marking, and concentration, and was notorious for his intense commitment, aggression, and occasional outrageous outbursts on the pitch, as well as his tendency to pick up cards. He was nicknamed the "animal" throughout his career by former Juventus president Gianni Agnelli and former Juventus team-mate Roberto Tricella, due to his physical, tenacious style of play, as well as his tendency to commit violent, and often, illegal challenges. Due to his temperamental character and his behaviour on the pitch, he was frequently involved in altercations with opponents, most notably Roberto Baggio, who often criticised Bruno for his challenges and aggression on the pitch, as well as with Massimo Crippa, Marco van Basten, Carlo Ancelotti, Pierluigi Casiraghi, Gianluca Vialli, Franco Lerda, Rubén Sosa, Florin Răducioiu, Paolo Di Canio, and Diego Maradona.

One of the most infamous disputes between Bruno and Baggio occurred during the final weeks of the 1988–89 Serie A season, on 28 May 1989, when Juventus faced rivals Fiorentina in Turin. Bruno kicked Baggio down when he was away from the ball, and Baggio subsequently retaliated, resulting in both players being sent-off and receiving a two-match suspension. According to Bruno, Baggio later confronted him in the changing rooms due to his actions, whilst Bruno apparently threatened Baggio further and accused him of diving and being a prima donna, resulting in a rivalry between the two players. Baggio's transfer to Juventus in 1990 also coincided with Bruno's departure from the club to local rivals Torino.

Although he was often out-spoken during his career, Bruno later stated that he regretted his behaviour on the pitch; he also stated that his character on the football field was completely different to his disposition off the pitch, describing his perceived change in character as a "metamorphosis"; indeed, despite his notorious reputation as a player, Bruno was also known for his composure in post-match interviews.

== Honours ==
Juventus

- UEFA Cup: 1989–90
- Coppa Italia: 1989–90

Torino

- Mitropa Cup: 1990–91
- Coppa Italia: 1992–93

Fiorentina

- Serie B: 1993–94

Individual

- Torino FC Hall of Fame: 2019
