= Thomas Brown (footballer) =

English footballer

Personal information
- Place of birth: Sunderland, England
- Height: 5 ft 8 in (1.73 m)
- Position: Inside forward

Youth career
- Sunderland Royal Rovers

Senior career*
Years	Team	Apps	(Gls)
1907–1908	Sunderland	1	(0)
1908–1910	St Mirren		
1910–191?	Hamilton Academical		
- * Club domestic league appearances and goals

Thomas Brown was an English professional footballer who played as an inside forward for Sunderland.
