= Pierre van Hooijdonk =

Dutch footballer (born 1969)

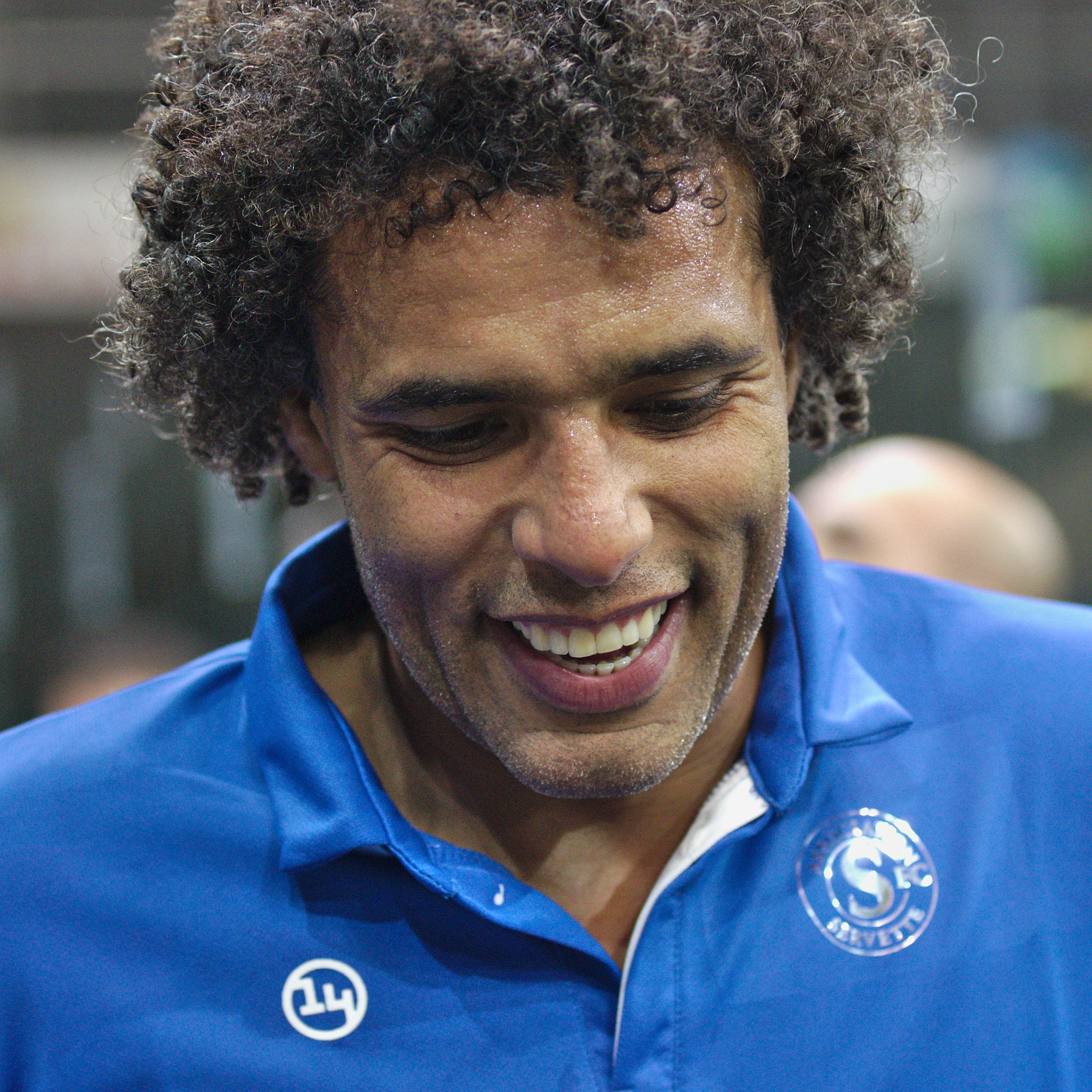
- Van Hooijdonk in 2014

Personal information
- Full name: Pierre van Hooijdonk
- Date of birth: 29 November 1969 (age 56)
- Place of birth: Steenbergen, Netherlands
- Height: 1.93 m (6 ft 4 in)
- Position: Striker

Youth career
- –1980: SC Welberg
- NAC
- 1986–1989: VV Steenbergen

Senior career*
Years	Team	Apps	(Gls)
1989–1991	RBC	69	(33)
1991–1995	NAC	115	(81)
1995–1997	Celtic	69	(44)
1997–1999	Nottingham Forest	71	(36)
1999–2000	Vitesse	29	(25)
2000–2001	Benfica	30	(19)
2001–2003	Feyenoord	61	(52)
2003–2005	Fenerbahçe	53	(32)
2005–2006	NAC	17	(5)
2006–2007	Feyenoord	37	(8)
Total		551	(335)

International career
1991	Netherlands U21	5	(0)
1994–2004	Netherlands	46	(14)

Managerial career
- 2011: Turkey (assistant)
Medal record
Men's football
Representing Netherlands
UEFA European Championship
Bronze medal – third place	2000
Bronze medal – third place	2004
- * Club domestic league appearances and goals

Pierre van Hooijdonk (Dutch pronunciation: [piˈjɛr vɑn ˈɦoːidɔŋk]; born 29 November 1969) is a Dutch retired footballer who played as a striker. He had spells with clubs across Europe where he was a prolific goal scorer. Van Hooijdonk was capped 46 times for the Netherlands national team, for which he scored 14 goals and played in the 1998 FIFA World Cup, Euro 2000 and Euro 2004. Noted for his bending free kicks, he is regarded by some as one of the greatest free kick specialists of all time.

== Early life ==
Van Hooijdonk was born in Steenbergen. His Moroccan biological father left Van Hooijdonk's mother before his birth. He grew up in Welberg (nl), a small village near Steenbergen. His favourite team was NAC Breda whose game he followed wholeheartedly. At 11 years old, while playing with local team SC Welberg's youth squad, he took part in a trial on the NAC open day, impressed their scouts and joined the club. At that time he played mainly as a right midfielder; when he was 14, he was cut from NAC's academy and he went into amateur football with VV Steenbergen. He then switched his position to become a striker, and ascended to the club's first team.

== Club career ==
=== Early career ===
As RBC Roosendaal were in financial trouble, they were obliged to have youth players feature within their senior teams. In the 1988–89 season, Van Hooijdonk made his debut for RBC as a substitute. While playing as a sub for the club, he soon scored three goals. With the club's main striker suffering from an injury, Van Hooijdonk played almost the majority of the season's second half, scoring six goals in 32 matches. He signed his first professional contract with RBC soon thereafter. Van Hooijdonk made a greater impression in the following season, becoming a key player for the team, scoring 27 times in 37 matches. Several teams went on to show interest in him, such as NAC Breda. Van Hooijdonk didn't hesitate in signing a contract with NAC and rejoined his boyhood club.

NAC paid 400,000 guilders for the transfer of Van Hooijdonk. In returning to NAC, he was both positive in his outlook and determined to illustrate his quality. Van Hooijdonk succeeded at such, going on to help the team win promotion to the Eredivisie in 1993. During his time at the club, he got his first call-up in December 1994 to play for the Netherlands. During the rest of that season, he set a scoring streak in 11 consecutive Eredivisie matches. Within the 1994–95 winter break, Celtic made a deal with NAC, which saw Van Hooijdonk join up with the Scottish outfit at once. Altogether he scored 81 goals in 115 appearances for NAC.

=== Celtic ===
Van Hooijdonk made his Celtic debut on 11 January 1995 in a league match against Hearts at Hampden Park. The striker made an instant impact for his new team by scoring a stunning opening goal. Hearts went on to equalise and so the game finished 1–1. Van Hooijdonk settled quickly at Celtic, and he became an instant favourite with the fans. When Van Hooijdonk arrived at Celtic they had not won any trophies in six years. With Van Hooijdonk in tow, Celtic won the Scottish Cup of that season with him being the only goalscorer in the final against Airdrie in May 1995.

The following 1995–96 season, saw Van Hooijdonk in outstanding form for Celtic. He scored 32 goals, including 26 in the League which saw him finish as top scorer. Of particular note was his prowess at scoring from free kicks. However, despite Van Hooijdonk's goals and the attractive football being played by manager Tommy Burns' side, Celtic still finished the season without any silverware.

Van Hooijdonk's next season at Celtic, 1996–97, was an unhappy time for both the player and the club. A row with the Celtic chairman/owner, Fergus McCann, would rumble on and as a result, he often ended up on the bench. The manager of the Netherlands national team Guus Hiddink then told him he wouldn't be selected for such as long as he was not a regular at Celtic.

He eventually left Celtic over a wage dispute towards the end of the 1996–97 season, stating that the reputed £7,000-a-week rise he was being offered might be "good enough for the homeless" to live on "but not for an international striker." In total, Van Hooijdonk scored 52 goals for Celtic in 84 appearances. He went on to join up with Nottingham Forest in a deal worth up to £4.5 million.

=== Nottingham Forest ===
Van Hooijdonk arrived as Forest were in deep relegation trouble, struggling to maintain their position in the Premier League. He made his debut for Forest in a 1–1 draw against Blackburn on 11 March 1997. It was hoped the arrival of van Hooijdonk would kick-start their survival, but he scored just one goal in his eight games for them that season. Although only one of those games was lost, the other seven were drawn, and Forest was relegated. He immediately pledged his future to help the club regain its status.

The following season was an unqualified success, both for him and Forest. Forest won the title and promotion in a competitive league (facing stiff opposition from Sunderland, Charlton and Middlesbrough), with van Hooijdonk scoring 34 goals and building up a good partnership with strike partner Kevin Campbell, who scored 23 times. During the 97–98 season, Van Hooijdonk clashed with manager Dave Bassett over the setup of the team and desired a move to PSV Eindhoven. Newcastle United also offered £7 million for him, but Bassett would only let Van Hooijdonk go for £10 million. He was a regular in the Netherlands national squad, and was named in the Dutch squad for 1998 FIFA World Cup in France where he scored as a substitute in the match against South Korea.

After the World Cup had finished he discovered that the promised strengthening to the Forest squad to enable them to cope back in the Premier League had not transpired, indeed that his strike partner Campbell (who had an ongoing back injury) had been sold to Trabzonspor for £2.5m. The club had also announced that Scot Gemmill was dropped from the first team for refusing to sign a new contract, and that club captain and terrace hero Colin Cooper was being allowed to leave to the team promoted alongside them as runners up, Middlesbrough. Van Hooijdonk asked for a transfer. The club's new owners refused. Van Hooijdonk announced that he had been told previously that he could leave the club at the end of the 1997–98 season if he so wished, that he felt betrayed by the club's owners who had failed to deliver on their promises to him regarding the strengthening of the team, and that he felt he could no longer play for his employers. Forest, desperate for a striker, refused to allow him to be transfer-listed again, so van Hooijdonk announced his intention to strike. He kept fit by training with his former club NAC Breda.

Because of his behaviour, Van Hooijdonk received criticism both from fans and from his teammates, not least from team-mate Steve Stone and manager Dave Bassett. The club refused to listen to offers for him, as they needed a top striker and the stand-off lasted until early November when van Hooijdonk, realising that he had no choice, agreed to return and played in a game against Wimbledon. By this time the club was again in relegation trouble: bottom of the league without a win in nine games. He played sporadically between then and the end of the season. He scored 6 goals in his 19 starts in the Premier League, including his first goal in his second game back against Forest's fierce rivals Derby County, helping them to a draw. Infamously after this goal, most of his team-mates refused to celebrate alongside him, instead going to Scot Gemmill, the man who crossed the ball to him. He also scored a last-minute home equaliser against rivals Liverpool with a trademark free-kick that protected Forest's proud unbeaten home run against them that went back to 1984. In another game against Leicester City he scored to put Forest 1–0 up but was then sent off as they ultimately lost 3–1. Forest ended the 1998–99 Premier League season bottom and were relegated. Ralf Rangnick, then coach of VfB Stuttgart, wanted to bring Van Hooijdonk to Germany, but chairman Gerhard Mayer-Vorfelder refused, feeling that Van Hooijdonk was too expensive at the age of 30.

=== Vitesse ===
At the end of the 1998–99 season he returned to the Netherlands with SBV Vitesse in a £3.5m move to continue his career after and did much to convince his critics of his goal-scoring abilities when he helped the Arnhem team to a UEFA Cup spot with 25 goals in one season. He also returned to the Netherlands national team in this period.

=== Benfica ===
Van Hooijdonk then signed a three-year deal for Benfica in 2000 where he joined up with one of the former Celtic F.C. 'three amigos' Jorge Cadete. He eventually only played one season for them with 19 goals. At Benfica he faced the same structural problems as he faced at Nottingham Forest and the team used three different managers throughout the season. The new chairman at the club had no faith in Van Hooijdonk and he was set back into its second team. Benfica was planning on selling him to another foreign club, but all Van Hooijdonk wanted was to return to his home country. At the end of the 2000–01 season, he signed for his fourth Dutch club, Feyenoord.

=== Feyenoord ===
While at Feyenoord, he was noted for his free-kick ability and played a key role in the club's UEFA Cup 2001–02 campaign. He scored twice against Borussia Dortmund in the final at De Kuip and also contributed in earlier rounds against SC Freiburg, Rangers, PSV, and Inter Milan.

=== Later career ===
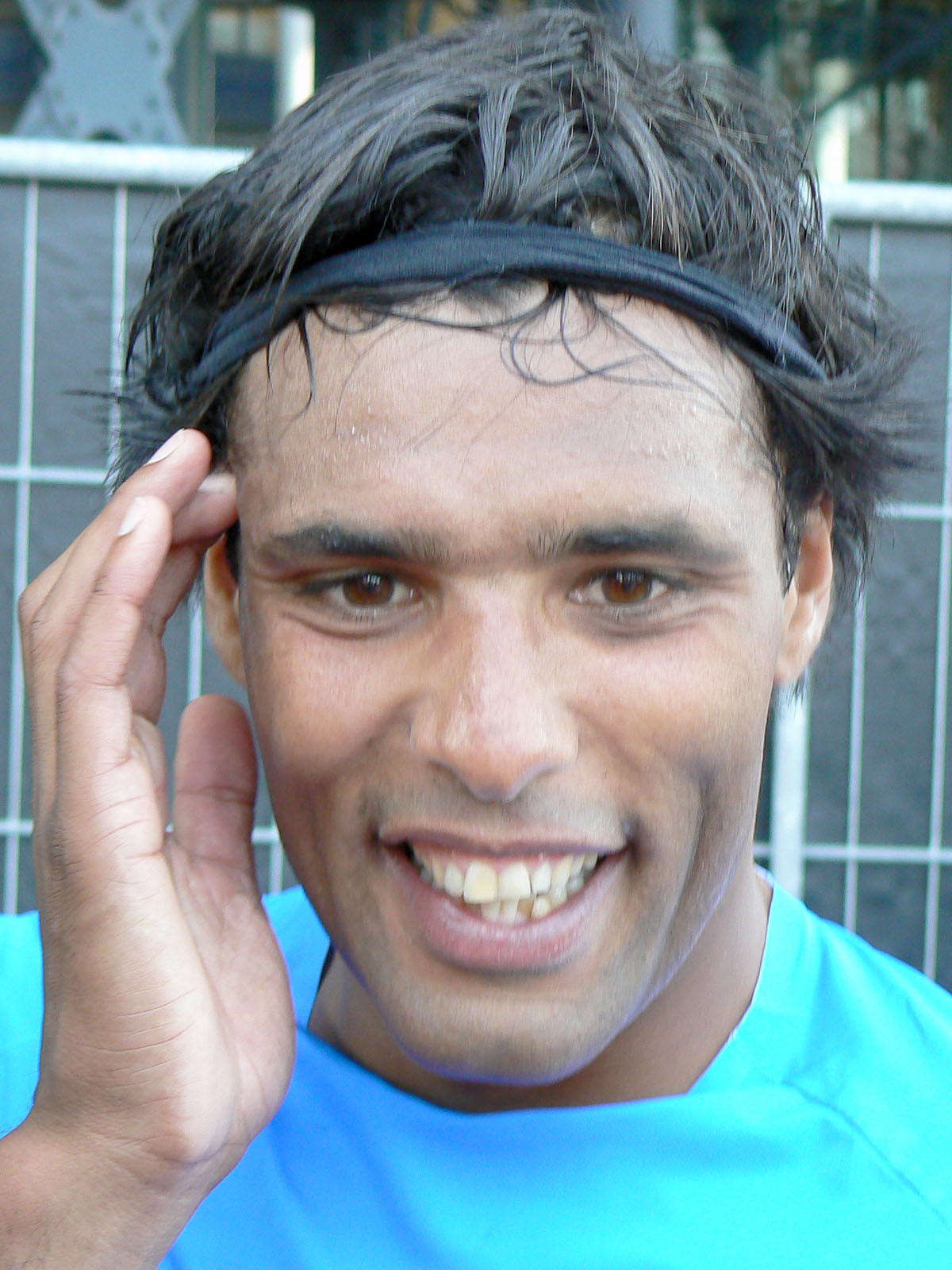
Van Hooijdonk in 2012

Never one to settle down, van Hooijdonk joined Fenerbahçe SK at the beginning of the 2003–04 season where he featured in 52 games for the Turkish club and scored 32 goals (24 in his first season). He was nicknamed Aziz Pierre (means Saint Pierre in Turkish) by fans. He wore the number 17, the same number that he wore for the national team. He won the Süper Lig title in 2003–04 (the first top-tier championship of his career) and again the following year in 2004–05 with Fenerbahçe.

In mid-2005, he signed again for his former club, NAC, playing 17 games, scoring 5 goals. During the winter transfer window of the 2005–06 season, he signed for another former club, Feyenoord, where he scored 8 goals in 37 appearances. On 17 October 2006, Van Hooijdonk announced his retirement at the end of the 2006–07 season. On 13 May 2007, he eventually played his final professional match after a draw with Feyenoord against FC Groningen in the play-offs, having played 550 games (335 goals) in the highest leagues in 18 seasons of professional football.

== International career ==
Van Hooijdonk played 5 games for the Netherlands national under-21 football team.

== Personal life ==
Van Hooijdonk has a son, Sydney, who made his debut for NAC Breda in 2018.

It was reported in May 2008 that van Hooijdonk had been a victim of fraud and had lost £2,000,000 to a scam, which involved him investing in a Chinese textile company that did not exist.

In 2011 van Hooijdonk worked as an assistant to Turkey manager Guus Hiddink. Later he worked in several positions at former club NAC but left the club after an alleged conflict of interest regarding possible involvement with a transfer of his son Sydney to Portuguese club Estrela Amadora. He was later cleared of all charges.

== Career statistics ==
=== Club ===
Appearances and goals by club, season and competition
Club	Season	League			National cup (Note: Includes KNVB Cup, Scottish Cup, FA Cup, Taça de Portugal, Turkish Cup)		League cup (Note: Includes Scottish League Cup, Football League Cup)		Europe		Other		Total	
Club	Season	Division	Apps	Goals	Apps	Goals	Apps	Goals	Apps	Goals	Apps	Goals	Apps	Goals
RBC	1989–90	Eerste Divisie	32	6			–		–		–		32	6
RBC	1990–91	Eerste Divisie	37	27			–		–		–		37	27
RBC	Total		69	33			–		–		–		69	33
NAC	1991–92	Eerste Divisie	35	20			–		–		–		35	20
NAC	1992–93	Eerste Divisie	33	26			–		–		–		33	26
NAC	1993–94	Eredivisie	31	25			–		–		–		31	25
NAC	1994–95	Eredivisie	16	10			–		–		–		16	10
NAC	Total		115	81			–		–		–		115	81
Celtic	1994–95	Scottish Premier Division	14	4	5	4	0	0	–		–		19	8
Celtic	1995–96	Scottish Premier Division	34	26	4	4	3	2	3 (Note: Appearances in UEFA Cup Winners' Cup)	0	–		44	32
Celtic	1996–97	Scottish Premier Division	21	14	2	1	2	1	4 (Note: Appearances in UEFA Cup)	0	–		29	16
Celtic	Total		69	44	11	9	5	3	7	0	–		92	56
Nottingham Forest	1996–97	Premier League	8	1	0	0	0	0	–		–		8	1
Nottingham Forest	1997–98	First Division	42	29	1	1	4	4	–		–		47	34
Nottingham Forest	1998–99	Premier League	21	6	0	0	1	0	–		–		22	6
Nottingham Forest	Total		71	36	1	1	5	4	–		–		77	41
Vitesse	1999–2000	Eredivisie	29	25	3	1	–		4	2	–		36	28
Benfica	2000–01	Primeira Liga	30	19	3	2	–		2	2	–		35	23
Feyenoord	2001–02	Eredivisie	33	24	2	0	–		12 (Note: Four appearances and one goal in UEFA Champions League, eight appearances and eight goals in UEFA Cup)	9	–		47	33
Feyenoord	2002–03	Eredivisie	28	28	4	0	–		5 (Note: Appearances in UEFA Champions League)	1	1 (Note: Appearance in UEFA Super Cup)	1	38	30
Feyenoord	Total		61	52	6	0	–		17	10	1	1	85	63
Fenerbahçe	2003–04	Süper Lig	34	24	3	1	–		–		–		37	25
Fenerbahçe	2004–05	Süper Lig	19	8	2	1	–		5 (Note: Four appearances and one goal in UEFA Champions League, one appearance in UEFA Cup)	1	–		26	10
Fenerbahçe	Total		53	32	5	2	–		5	1	–		63	35
NAC Breda	2005–06	Eredivisie	17	5	3	3	–		–		–		20	8
Feyenoord	2005–06	Eredivisie	11	3	0	0	–		0	0	1 (Note: Appearances in Eredivisie European play-offs)	0	12	3
Feyenoord	2006–07	Eredivisie	26	5	2	0	–		4	0	2	1	34	6
Feyenoord	Total		37	8	2	0	–		4	0	3	1	46	9
Career total			551	335	34	18	10	7	39	15	4	2	638	377

=== International ===
Appearances and goals by national team and year
National team	Year	Apps	Goals
Netherlands	1994	1	0
Netherlands	1995	1	0
Netherlands	1996	2	2
Netherlands	1997	5	2
Netherlands	1998	6	2
Netherlands	1999	2	1
Netherlands	2000	3	0
Netherlands	2001	8	3
Netherlands	2002	1	0
Netherlands	2003	5	1
Netherlands	2004	12	3
Total		46	14

Scores and results list Netherlands' goal tally first, score column indicates score after each van Hooijdonk goal.

List of international goals scored by Pierre van Hooijdonk
No.	Date	Venue	Opponent	Score	Result	Competition	Ref.
1	5 October 1996	Cardiff Arms Park, Cardiff, Wales	Wales	1–1	3–1	1998 FIFA World Cup qualification	
2	5 October 1996	Cardiff Arms Park, Cardiff, Wales	Wales	2–1	3–1	1998 FIFA World Cup qualification	
3	29 March 1997	Amsterdam ArenA, Amsterdam, Netherlands	San Marino	3–0	4–0	1998 FIFA World Cup qualification	
4	30 April 1997	San Marino Stadium, Serravalle, San Marino	San Marino	3–0	6–0	1998 FIFA World Cup qualification	
5	5 June 1998	Amsterdam ArenA, Amsterdam, Netherlands	Nigeria	5–1	5–1	Friendly	
6	20 June 1998	Stade Vélodrome, Marseille, France	South Korea	4–0	5–0	1998 FIFA World Cup	
7	8 June 1999	Estádio Serra Dourada, Goiânia, Brazil	Brazil	1–3	1–3	Friendly	
8	24 March 2001	Mini Estadi, Barcelona, Spain	Andorra	3–0	5–0	2002 FIFA World Cup qualification	
9	24 March 2001	Mini Estadi, Barcelona, Spain	Andorra	4–0	5–0	2002 FIFA World Cup qualification	
10	6 October 2001	GelreDome, Arnhem, Netherlands	Andorra	1–0	4–0	2002 FIFA World Cup qualification	
11	11 October 2003	Philips Stadion, Eindhoven, Netherlands	Moldova	3–0	5–0	UEFA Euro 2004 qualifying	
12	28 April 2004	Philips Stadion, Eindhoven, Netherlands	Greece	4–0	4–0	Friendly	
13	8 September 2004	Amsterdam ArenA, Amsterdam, Netherlands	Czech Republic	1–0	2–0	2006 FIFA World Cup qualification	
14	8 September 2004	Amsterdam ArenA, Amsterdam, Netherlands	Czech Republic	2–0	2–0	2006 FIFA World Cup qualification	

== Honours ==
Celtic

- Scottish Cup: 1994–95

Nottingham Forest

- Football League First Division: 1997–98

Feyenoord

- UEFA Cup: 2001–02

Fenerbahçe

- Süper Lig: 2003–04, 2004–05

Individual

- Scottish Premier Division top scorer: 1995–96
- PFA Team of the Year: 1997–98 First Division
- Football League First Division top scorer: 1997–98
- Nottingham Forest Player of the Year: 1997–98
- UEFA Cup Top Scorer: 2001–02
- Eredivisie Top Scorer: 2001–02
- Dutch Footballer of the Year: 2001–02
- Turkish Footballer of the Year: 2004
