= Paul Ritchie (footballer, born 1975) =

Scottish footballer (born 1975)

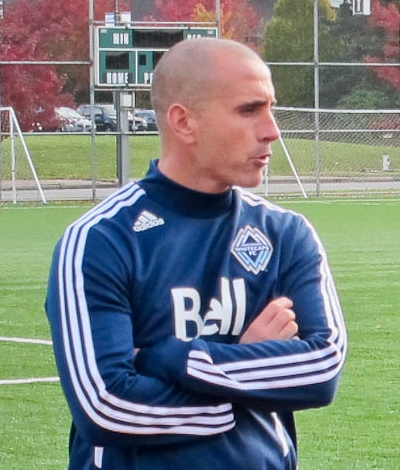
- Ritchie in 2011

Personal information
- Full name: Paul Simon Ritchie
- Date of birth: 21 August 1975 (age 51)
- Place of birth: Kirkcaldy, Scotland
- Height: 1.80 m (5 ft 11 in)
- Position: Centre-back

Senior career*
Years	Team	Apps	(Gls)
1992–2000	Heart of Midlothian	133	(6)
1999–2000	→ Bolton Wanderers (loan)	14	(0)
2000	Rangers	0	(0)
2000–2003	Manchester City	20	(0)
2002	→ Portsmouth (loan)	12	(0)
2003	→ Derby County (loan)	7	(0)
2003–2004	Walsall	33	(1)
2004–2006	Dundee United	45	(0)
2006–2007	AC Omonia	2	(0)
2009	Carolina RailHawks	1	(0)
Total		267	(7)

International career
1996–1997	Scotland U-21	7	(0)
1999–2004	Scotland	7	(1)

Managerial career
- 2010–2011: Carolina RailHawks (assistant)
- 2011–2013: Vancouver Whitecaps FC (assistant)
- * Club domestic league appearances and goals

Paul Simon Ritchie (born 21 August 1975) is a Scottish football coach and former professional player. A centre-back, he started his playing career with Heart of Midlothian, making 133 league appearances for the club and helping it win the Scottish Cup in 1998. He played for several clubs after leaving Hearts during the 1999–2000 season. Ritchie made seven appearances for the Scotland national team between 1999 and 2004, scoring one goal. Since retiring as a player he has worked as a football coach, as assistant coach with Vancouver Whitecaps FC in Major League Soccer and for San Diego, the LA Galaxy-affiliated youth soccer club.

== Club career ==
Beginning his career with Heart of Midlothian (Hearts) in 1992, Ritchie quickly gained a reputation as a promising defender, gaining a regular first team place and winning Scotland under-21 caps. The highlight of his time at Hearts was undoubtedly the club's Scottish Cup win in 1998. Persistent speculation linked him with a move to Rangers, particularly with his Hearts contract due to expire in 2000. The Tynecastle club, however, were unwilling to allow him to move to a rival cheaply, and he spent time with Bolton Wanderers on a short-term contract and appeared in both the FA Cup and League Cup Semi Finals before finally joining Rangers on a Bosman free transfer in June 2000.

However, Rangers manager Dick Advocaat then elected to sell Ritchie to Manchester City for a fee of £500,000 just two months later, without him ever playing a first team match for the club. Ritchie spent three years with City, but struggled throughout to earn a regular place in their team, spending time out on loan with Portsmouth and Derby County. While at Portsmouth he contributed 12 appearances in the first half of the 2002–03 season, at the end of which they won the First Division Championship and promotion to the Premier League. In August 2003 he left on a free transfer and joined Walsall, where despite suffering relegation he was at least able to play regular first team football again, forcing himself back into the international reckoning with some inspirational performances, scoring once against Rotherham United. However, whilst at Walsall he was caught up in a contract dispute with owner Jeff Bonser, indirectly leading to the dismissal of Saddler's manager Colin Lee.

After leaving Walsall, Ritchie signed a short-term contract with Dundee United, despite interest from Kilmarnock, Livingston and Sheffield Utd. His contract was later extended despite injury problems limiting his appearances at first. For a while he was regularly captaining the team, but in April 2006 United manager Craig Brewster announced Ritchie was free to leave the club at the end of the season, despite having a year of his contract left to run. His departure was finally confirmed in August 2006. He then moved to Omonia Nicosia but left at the end of the season because of an injury to his cruciate ligament. Ritchie moved to Dundee as youth coach in summer 2007 but left in November.

In 2009, Ritchie signed with Carolina RailHawks of the USL First Division in the United States. In June 2009 it was announced that Ritchie had left the club, having made just one first team appearance.

== International career ==
Ritchie represented Scotland seven times. He made his debut in a friendly win against Germany in April 1999. His next cap against the Czech Republic saw him score his only international goal. Within a year he had taken his cap total to six, but thereafter a lack of first team football at Manchester City saw him drop out of contention. He won only one more cap, against Wales in 2004 following some fine displays for Walsall.

== Coaching career ==
After his playing career ended in 2009, Ritchie returned to Britain to complete his coaching badges and work for the Manchester United soccer schools. He returned to Carolina RailHawks as assistant coach in 2010 and 2011 under manager Martin Rennie. Rennie moved on to Vancouver Whitecaps FC in November 2011 and brought Ritchie with him as assistant coach for the Major League Soccer club. Ritchie was released in January 2014 after Rennie was sacked.

In 2019 he was the youth soccer coach for San Diego, the MLS-affiliated youth soccer club of LA Galaxy.

== Career statistics ==
Appearances and goals by club, season and competition
Club	Season	League			National Cup		League Cup		Continental		Total	
Club	Season	Division	Apps	Goals	Apps	Goals	Apps	Goals	Apps	Goals	Apps	Goals
Heart of Midlothian	1995–96	Scottish Premier Division	28	1	5	2	0	0	–		33	3
Heart of Midlothian	1996–97	Scottish Premier Division	28	3	1	0	4	0	2	0	35	3
Heart of Midlothian	1997–98	Scottish Premier Division	34	0	5	1	3	0	–		42	1
Heart of Midlothian	1998–99	Scottish Premier League	29	1	1	0	2	0	4	0	36	1
Heart of Midlothian	1999–2000	Scottish Premier League	14	1	0	0	2	0	–		16	1
Heart of Midlothian	Total		133	6	12	3	11	0	6	0	162	9
Bolton Wanderers (loan)	1999–2000	Football League First Division	14	0	4	0	1	0	–		19	0
Manchester City	2000–01	Premier League	12	0	1	0	3	0	–		16	0
Manchester City	2001–02	Football League First Division	8	0	2	0	1	0	–		11	0
Manchester City	Total		20	0	3	0	4	0	0	0	27	0
Portsmouth	2002–03	Football League First Division	12	0	0	0	1	0	–		13	0
Derby County	2002–03	Football League First Division	7	0	0	0	0	0	–		7	0
Walsall	2003–04	Football League First Division	33	1	1	0	1	0	–		35	1
Dundee United	2004–05	Scottish Premier League	24	0	5	0	2	0	–		31	0
Dundee United	2005–06	Scottish Premier League	21	0	0	0	1	0	1	0	23	0
Dundee United	Total		45	0	5	0	3	0	1	0	54	0
AC Omonia	2006–07	Cypriot First Division	2	0							2	0
Career total			266	7	25	3	21	0	7	0	319	10

== Honours ==
Hearts

- Scottish Cup: 1998
