= 1995–96 Scottish Cup =

Tournament details
- Country: Scotland

Final positions
- Champions: Rangers
- Runners-up: Heart of Midlothian

Tournament statistics
- Top goal scorer: Pierre van Hooijdonk (4)

The 1995–96 Scottish Cup was the 111th staging of Scotland's most prestigious football knockout competition. The Cup was won by Rangers who defeated Heart of Midlothian in the final.

== First round ==
| Home team | Score | Away team |
|---|---|---|
| Albion Rovers (4) | 0 – 2 | Deveronvale (HL) |
| Glasgow University (Ama) | 0 – 1 | Spartans (ESL) |
| Stenhousemuir (3) | 2 – 2 | Arbroath (4) |
| Stranraer (3) | 0 – 3 | Livingston (4) |

=== Replay ===
| Home team | Score | Away team |
|---|---|---|
| Arbroath (4) | 0 – 1 | Stenhousemuir (3) |

== Second round ==
| Home team | Score | Away team |
|---|---|---|
| East Stirlingshire (4) | 0 – 1 | Stenhousemuir (3) |
| Ayr United (3) | 0 – 2 | Ross County (4) |
| Berwick Rangers (3) | 3 – 3 | Annan Athletic (ESL) |
| Clyde (3) | 2 – 2 | Brechin City (4) |
| Deveronvale (HL) | 0 – 0 | Keith (HL) |
| Forfar Athletic (3) | 3 – 1 | Lossiemouth (HL) |
| Inverness CT (4) | 3 – 2 | Livingston (4) |
| Montrose (3) | 2 – 1 | Cowdenbeath (4) |
| Queen of the South (3) | 2 – 4 | Queen's Park (4) |
| Spartans (ESL) | 0 – 0 | East Fife (3) |
| Stirling Albion (3) | 3 – 1 | Alloa Athletic (4) |
| Whitehill Welfare (ESL) | 2 – 2 | Fraserburgh (HL) |

=== Replays ===
| Home team | Score | Away team |
|---|---|---|
| Brechin City (4) | 1 – 3 | Clyde (3) |
| Annan Athletic (SSL) | 1 – 2 | Berwick Rangers (3) |
| East Fife (3) | 2 – 1 | Spartans (ESL) |
| Fraserburgh (HL) | 1 – 2 | Whitehill Welfare (ESL) |
| Keith (HL) | 2 – 0 | Deveronvale (HL) |

== Third round ==
| Home team | Score | Away team |
|---|---|---|
| Berwick Rangers (3) | 1 – 2 | Dundee United (1) |
| Greenock Morton (2) | 1 – 1 | Montrose (3) |
| Dunfermline Athletic (2) | 3 – 0 | St Mirren (2) |
| Clyde (3) | 3 – 1 | Dundee (2) |
| Hamilton Academical (2) | 0 – 1 | St Johnstone (2) |
| Hearts (1) | 1 – 0 | Partick Thistle (1) |
| Clydebank (2) | 0 – 1 | Stirling Albion (3) |
| Dumbarton (2) | 1 – 3 | Airdrieonians (2) |
| Falkirk (1) | 0 – 2 | Stenhousemuir (3) |
| Motherwell (1) | 0 – 2 | Aberdeen (1) |
| Whitehill Welfare (ESL) | 0 – 3 | Celtic (1) |
| Hibernian (1) | 0 – 2 | Kilmarnock (1) |
| Inverness CT (4) | 1 – 1 | East Fife (3) |
| Keith (HL) | 1 – 10 | Rangers (1) |
| Raith Rovers (1) | 3 – 0 | Queen's Park (4) |
| Ross County (4) | 0 – 3 | Forfar Athletic (3) |

=== Replays ===
| Home team | Score | Away team |
|---|---|---|
| Montrose (3) | 3 – 2 | Greenock Morton (2) |
| East Fife (3) | 1 – 1 (1 – 3 pen.) | Inverness CT (4) |

== Fourth round ==
| Home team | Score | Away team |
|---|---|---|
| Airdrieonians (2) | 2 – 2 | Forfar Athletic (3) |
| Celtic (1) | 2 – 0 | Raith Rovers (1) |
| Dundee United (1) | 1 – 0 | Dunfermline Athletic (2) |
| Kilmarnock (1) | 1 – 2 | Hearts (1) |
| St Johnstone (2) | 3 – 0 | Montrose (3) |
| Stenhousemuir (3) | 0 – 1 | Inverness CT (4) |
| Stirling Albion (3) | 0 – 2 | Aberdeen (1) |
| Clyde (3) | 1 – 4 | Rangers (1) |

=== Replay ===
| Home team | Score | Away team |
|---|---|---|
| Forfar Athletic (3) | 0 – 0 (2–4 pens) | Airdrieonians (2) |

== Quarter-finals ==
| Home team | Score | Away team |
|---|---|---|
| Celtic (1) | 2 – 1 | Dundee United (2) |
| Aberdeen (1) | 2 – 1 | Airdrieonians (2) |
| Inverness CT (4) | 0 – 3 | Rangers (1) |
| St Johnstone (2) | 1 – 2 | Hearts (1) |

== Semi-finals ==
6 April 1996

| Hearts | 2–1 | Aberdeen |
|---|---|---|
| Allan Johnston; John Robertson | | Duncan Shearer |

Hampden Park, Glasgow
Attendance: 27,785

7 April 1996

| Rangers | 2–1 | Celtic |
|---|---|---|
| Brian Laudrup; Ally McCoist | | Pierre Van Hooijdonk |

Hampden Park, Glasgow
Attendance: 36,333

== Final ==
18 May 1996

| Rangers | 5–1 | Hearts |
|---|---|---|
| Laudrup 37', 50'; Durie 66', 80', 85' | | Colquhoun 79' |

Hampden Park, Glasgow
Attendance: 37,730
Referee: Hugh Dallas

== See also ==
- 1995–96 in Scottish football
- 1995–96 Scottish League Cup
