= 1996–97 Scottish First Division =

Scottish First Division
- Season: 1996–97
- Champions: St Johnstone
- Promoted: St Johnstone
- Relegated: East Fife, Clydebank
- Goals scored: 471
- Average goals/game: 2.62
- Top goalscorer: Roddy Grant (19)
- Biggest home win: Dundee 6–0 East Fife; Partick Thistle 6–0 East Fife
- Biggest away win: East Fife 1–7 Dundee

The 1996–97 Scottish First Division season began on 12 August 1996.

== Overview ==
The 1996–97 Scottish First Division season ended in success for St Johnstone who won the title by twenty points from nearest rivals Airdrieonians.

== Promotion and relegation from 1995–96 ==
Promoted from First Division to Premier Division

- Dunfermline Athletic
- Dundee United

Relegated from Premier Division to First Division

- Partick Thistle
- Falkirk

Promoted from Second Division to First Division

- Stirling Albion
- East Fife

Relegated from First Division to Second Division

- Hamilton Academical
- Dumbarton

== League table ==
Pos	Team	Pld	W	D	L	GF	GA	GD	Pts	Promotion or relegation
1	St Johnstone (C, P)	36	24	8	4	74	23	+51	80	Promotion to the Premier Division
2	Airdrieonians	36	15	15	6	56	34	+22	60	Qualification for the Play-off
3	Dundee	36	15	13	8	47	33	+14	58	
4	St Mirren	36	17	7	12	48	41	+7	58	
5	Falkirk	36	15	9	12	42	39	+3	54	
6	Partick Thistle	36	12	12	12	49	48	+1	48	
7	Stirling Albion	36	12	10	14	54	61	−7	46	
8	Morton	36	12	9	15	42	41	+1	45	
9	Clydebank (R)	36	7	7	22	31	59	−28	28	Relegation to the Second Division
10	East Fife (R)	36	2	8	26	28	92	−64	14	Relegation to the Second Division

Source: RSSSF
Rules for classification: 1) points; 2) goal difference; 3) number of goals scored.
(C) Champions; (P) Promoted; (R) Relegated

== See also ==
- 1996–97 in Scottish football
