= Gilles Rousset =

French footballer (born 1963)

Personal information
- Date of birth: 22 August 1963 (age 63)
- Place of birth: Hyères, France
- Height: 6 ft 5 in (1.96 m)
- Position: Goalkeeper

Senior career*
Years	Team	Apps	(Gls)
1982–1990	Sochaux	100	(0)
1990–1993	Lyon	98	(0)
1993–1994	Marseille	0	(0)
1994–1995	Rennes	22	(0)
1995–2001	Hearts	132	(0)
Total		352	(0)

International career
1990–1992	France	2	(0)
- * Club domestic league appearances and goals

Gilles Rousset (French: [ʒil ʁusɛ]; born 22 August 1963) is a French former professional footballer, who played as a goalkeeper. Rousset started his career with Sochaux in 1982, where he spent eight seasons, playing more than 100 times for the Montbéliard side before he was transferred to Olympique Lyonnais in 1990. He quickly established himself as the first choice goalkeeper at the Stade de Gerland, playing 98 matches over the next 3 seasons.

During this period, Rousset was capped twice by France. He was selected in the squad for the 1992 Euro Championships although, as second choice goalkeeper, he did not play in Sweden.

In 1993, Rousset was surprisingly transferred to Olympique de Marseille, who were the reigning European Champions but embroiled in a corruption scandal. The presence of rising star Fabien Barthez ensured Rousset did not start a competitive match for the club and when Marseille were forcibly relegated in the summer of 1994, as punishment for their match fixing crimes, Rousset (and many other established players) were sold.

Rousset spent the next season with Stade Rennais before moving to Scotland to join Heart of Midlothian in 1995. He spent six seasons in Edinburgh, helping transform a Hearts side that had flirted with relegation into a dominant domestic competitor that came very close to splitting the Old Firm. He also won his only major honour there, the Scottish Cup in 1998, having been a losing finalist on 3 previous occasions earlier in his career (1988 with Sochaux and twice in 1996 with Hearts). The Scottish Cup was the first major trophy for Hearts in 36 years and Rousset went on to become a Hearts legend.

== Honours ==
Hearts

- Scottish Cup (1): 1997–98
