= 1995–96 Scottish League Cup =

Tournament details
- Country: Scotland

Final positions
- Champions: Aberdeen
- Runners-up: Dundee

The 1995–96 Scottish League Cup was the 50th staging of the Scotland's second most prestigious football knockout competition, also known for sponsorship reasons as the Coca-Cola Cup.

The competition was won by Aberdeen, who defeated Dundee 2–0 in the final at Hampden Park.

== First round ==
| Home team | Score | Away team |
|---|---|---|
| Albion Rovers (4) | 0–1 | (4) Cowdenbeath |
| Alloa Athletic (4) | 2–1 | (3) Forfar Athletic |
| Berwick Rangers (3) | (p)1 – 1 | Inverness Caledonian Thistle (4) |
| Brechin City (4) | 2–3 | East Fife (3) |
| Clyde (3) | 1–2 | East Stirlingshire (4) |
| Montrose (3) | 0–2 | Livingston (4) |
| Queen of the South (3) | 3–1 | Queen's Park (4) |
| Ross County (4) | 0–2 | Arbroath (4) |

== Second round ==
| Home team | Score | Away team |
|---|---|---|
| Aberdeen (1) | 3–1 | St Mirren (2) |
| Ayr United (3) | 0–3 | Celtic (1) |
| Berwick Rangers (3) | 0–7 | Partick Thistle (1) |
| Clydebank (2) | 1 – 1(p) | Motherwell (1) |
| Cowdenbeath (4) | 0–4 | Dundee United (2) |
| Dunfermline Athletic (2) | 3–0 | Stranraer (3) |
| East Fife (3) | 2–3 | Airdrieonians (2) |
| East Stirlingshire (4) | 0–6 | Dundee (2) |
| Heart of Midlothian (1) | 3–0 | Alloa Athletic (4) |
| Hibernian (1) | 3–1 | Stenhousemuir (3) |
| Kilmarnock (1) | 1–0 | Dumbarton (2) |
| Queen of the South (3) | 0–2 | Falkirk (1) |
| Raith Rovers (1) | 2–1 | Arbroath (4) |
| Rangers (1) | 3–0 | Morton (2) |
| St Johnstone (2) | 1 – 1(p) | Livingston (4) |
| Stirling Albion (3) | 2–0 | Hamilton Accies (2) |

== Third round ==
| Home team | Score | Away team |
|---|---|---|
| Airdrieonians (2) | 2–0 | Hibernian (1) |
| Celtic (1) | 2–1 | Raith Rovers (1) |
| Dundee (2) | 3–1 | Kilmarnock (1) |
| Dundee United (2) | 1–2 | Motherwell (1) |
| Falkirk (1) | 1–4 | Aberdeen (1) |
| Heart of Midlothian (1) | 2–1 | Dunfermline Athletic (2) |
| Livingston (4) | 1–2 | Partick Thistle (1) |
| Rangers (1) | 3–2 | Stirling Albion (3) |

== Quarter-finals ==
19 September 1995

| Celtic | 0–1 | Rangers |
|---|---|---|
| | Report |

Attendance: ?

20 September 1995

| Airdrieonians | 1 – 1 (a.e.t.) (3 – 2 pen.) | Partick Thistle |
|---|---|---|
| | Report |

Attendance: ?

20 September 1995

| Dundee | 4 – 4 (a.e.t.) (5 – 4 pen.) | Hearts |
|---|---|---|
| | Report |

Attendance: ?

20 September 1995

| Motherwell | 1–2 | Aberdeen |
|---|---|---|
| | Report |

Attendance: ?

== Semi-finals ==
22 October 1995

| Aberdeen | 2–1 | Rangers |
|---|---|---|
| Dodds | Report | Salenko |

Hampden Park, Glasgow
Attendance: 26,131

25 October 1995

| Dundee | 2–1 | Airdrieonians |
|---|---|---|
| Paul Tosh; McCann | Report | Duffield |

McDiarmid Park, Perth
Attendance: 8,900

== Final ==
26 November 1995

| Aberdeen | 2–0 | Dundee |
|---|---|---|
| Shearer 33'; Dodds 46' |

Hampden Park, Glasgow
Attendance: 33,099
Referee: Les Mottram
