= 1945–46 Hibernian F.C. season =

Hibernian
1945–46 season
- Manager: Willie McCartney
- Southern League: 2nd
- Victory Cup: F
- Scottish League Cup: GS
- Average home league attendance: No Attendances Available (league suspended)
Home colours

During the 1945–46 season Hibernian, a football club based in Edinburgh, came second out of 16 clubs in the Southern Football League.

== Southern League ==
Match Day	Date	Opponent	H/A	Score	Hibernian Scorer(s)	Attendance
1	11 August	Queen of the South	A	0–3		
2	18 August	Rangers	H	2–1		
3	25 August	Hamilton Academical	A	1–1		
4	1 September	Queen's Park	H	4–0		
5	8 September	Heart of Midlothian	A	2–0		40,000
6	15 September	Aberdeen	H	1–1		26,000
7	22 September	Clyde	A	2–2		
8	29 September	Morton	H	5–0		
9	6 October	Falkirk	A	1–2		
10	13 October	Kilmarnock	A	4–3		
11	20 October	Motherwell	H	0–0		
12	27 October	Third Lanark	A	1–2		
13	3 November	Celtic	H	1–1		
14	10 November	Partick Thistle	A	2–0		
14	17 November	St Mirren	H	3–2		
15	24 November	Queen of the South	H	6–1		
17	1 December	Rangers	A	2–3		
18	8 December	Hamilton Academical	H	1–2		
19	22 December	Aberdeen	A	1–2		
20	29 December	Clyde	H	3–2		
21	1 January	Heart of Midlothian	H	1–0		30,000
22	2 January	Morton	A	1–4		
23	5 January	Falkirk	H	4–1		
24	12 January	Kilmarnock	H	4–1		
25	19 January	Motherwell	A	0–0		
26	26 January	Third Lanark	H	4–0		
27	2 February	Celtic	A	1–0		
28	9 February	Partick Thistle	H	3–1		
29	16 February	St Mirren	A	3–0		
30	23 April	Queen's Park	A	4–2		

=== Final League table ===
P	Team	Pld	W	D	L	GF	GA	GD	Pts
1	Rangers	30	22	4	4	85	41	44	43
2	Hibernian	30	17	6	7	67	37	30	40
3	Aberdeen	30	16	6	8	73	41	32	38

=== Southern League Cup ===
==== Group stage ====
Round	Date	Opponent	H/A	Score	Hibernian Scorer(s)	Attendance
GC	23 February	Partick Thistle	H	1–0		
GC	2 March	Aberdeen	A	1–4		
GC	9 March	Kilmarnock	A	0–1		
GC	16 March	Partick Thistle	A	1–0		
GC	23 March	Aberdeen	H	3–2		
GC	30 March	Kilmarnock	H	4–0		

==== Group C final table ====
P	Team	Pld	W	D	L	GF	GA	GD	Pts
1	Aberdeen	6	4	0	2	21	13	8	8
2	Hibernian	6	4	0	2	10	7	3	8
3	Partick Thistle	6	1	2	3	6	6	0	4
4	Kilmarnock	6	1	2	3	4	11	–7	4

=== Victory Cup ===
Round	Date	Opponent	H/A	Score	Hibernian Scorer(s)	Attendance
R1 L1	20 April	Dundee	H	3–0		
R1 L2	27 April	Dundee	A	0–2		
R2	4 May	Heart of Midlothian	A	3–1		
R3	18 May	Partick Thistle	A	1–1		
R3 R	25 May	Partick Thistle	H	2–0		
SF	1 June	Clyde	A	2–1		
F	15 June	Rangers	N	1–3		80,640

== See also ==
- List of Hibernian F.C. seasons
