= 1928–29 Hibernian F.C. season =

Hibernian
1928–29 season
- Manager: Bobby Templeton
- Scottish First Division: 14th
- Scottish Cup: R1
- Average home league attendance: 8,947 (down 2,053)

During the 1928–29 season Hibernian, a football club based in Edinburgh, finished fourteenth out of 20 clubs in the Scottish First Division.

== Scottish First Division ==
Match Day	Date	Opponent	H/A	Score	Hibernian Scorer(s)	Attendance
1	11 August	St Johnstone	H	2–2		12,000
2	18 August	Kilmarnock	A	0–1		18,000
3	25 August	Aberdeen	H	4–1		10,000
4	1 September	Cowdenbeath	A	0–2		3,000
5	8 September	Falkirk	H	3–2		10,000
6	15 September	Clyde	A	1–0		5,000
7	22 September	Motherwell	H	1–1		10,000
8	29 September	Partick Thistle	H	3–1		10,000
9	6 October	Airdrieonians	A	2–0		5,000
10	13 October	Queen's Park	A	1–6		8,000
11	20 October	Heart of Midlothian	A	1–1		28,000
12	27 October	Third Lanark	H	6–1		6,000
13	3 November	Rangers	H	1–2		22,000
14	10 November	Hamilton Academical	A	1–2		3,000
15	17 November	Raith Rovers	H	2–0		8,000
16	24 November	Ayr United	H	2–2		5,000
17	8 December	St Mirren	A	0–1		6,000
18	15 December	Dundee	H	2–0		12,000
19	22 December	Kilmarnock	H	1–1		2,000
20	29 December	St Johnstone	A	0–4		3,000
21	1 January	Heart of Midlothian	H	1–0		25,000
22	2 January	Third Lanark	A	1–2		6,000
23	5 January	Aberdeen	A	1–0		14,500
24	12 January	Cowdenbeath	H	1–2		4,000
25	26 January	Dundee	A	0–1		8,000
26	9 February	Motherwell	A	1–3		5,000
27	16 February	Partick Thistle	A	0–3		3,000
28	20 February	Clyde	H	3–0		4,000
29	23 February	Celtic	H	2–1		10,000
30	2 March	Queen's Park	H	1–2		5,000
31	9 March	Rangers	A	0–3		15,000
32	16 March	Hamilton Academical	H	0–1		4,000
33	23 March	Raith Rovers	A	0–1		1,200
34	30 March	Ayr United	A	1–4		6,000
35	6 April	Airdrieonians	H	1–1		5,000
36	13 April	Celtic	A	4–1		10,000
37	20 April	St Mirren	H	3–5		6,000
38	27 April	Falkirk	A	1–2		2,000

=== Final League table ===
P	Team	Pld	W	D	L	GF	GA	GD	Pts
13	Cowdenbeath	38	14	5	19	55	69	–14	33
14	Hibernian	38	13	6	19	54	62	–8	32
15	Airdrieonians	38	12	7	19	56	65	–9	31

=== Scottish Cup ===
Round	Date	Opponent	H/A	Score	Hibernian Scorer(s)	Attendance
R1	19 January	St Johnstone	H	1–2		13,090

== See also ==
- List of Hibernian F.C. seasons
