= 1944–45 Hibernian F.C. season =

Hibernian
1944–45 season
- Manager: Willie McCartney
- Southern League: 4th
- Scottish Cup: F
- Scottish League Cup: GS
- Average home league attendance: No Attendances Available (league suspended)

During the 1944–45 season Hibernian, a football club based in Edinburgh, came fourth out of 16 clubs in the Southern Football League.

== Southern League ==
Match Day	Date	Opponent	H/A	Score	Hibernian Scorer(s)	Attendance
1	12 August	Clyde	H	0–4		
2	19 August	Morton	A	2–3		
3	26 August	Hamilton Academical	H	3–1		
4	2 September	Dumbarton	A	3–0		3,500
5	9 September	Heart of Midlothian	H	3–1		20,000
6	16 September	Queen's Park	A	2–0		
7	23 September	Rangers	H	4–1		
8	30 September	Albion Rovers	A	5–0		
9	7 October	Falkirk	A	3–1		
10	14 October	Celtic	A	1–1		
11	21 October	Partick Thistle	H	8–0		
12	28 October	Third Lanark	A	6–3		
13	4 November	St Mirren	H	6–2		
14	11 November	Airdrieonians	H	3–2		
14	18 November	Motherwell	H	0–1		
15	25 November	Clyde	A	3–2		
17	2 December	Morton	A	0–1		
18	9 December	Hamilton Academical	A	1–1		
19	16 December	Dumbarton	H	0–0		5,000
20	23 December	Rangers	A	0–5		
21	30 December	Queen's Park	H	2–0		
22	1 January	Heart of Midlothian	A	0–3		23,507
23	2 January	Motherwell	A	0–3		
24	6 January	Albion Rovers	H	4–1		
25	13 January	Falkirk	H	3–0		
26	20 January	Celtic	H	2–4		
27	3 February	Third Lanark	H	2–4		
28	10 February	St Mirren	A	1–1		
29	17 February	Airdrieonians	A	1–1		
30	28 April	Partick Thistle	A	1–5		

=== Final League table ===
P	Team	Pld	W	D	L	GF	GA	GD	Pts
4	Clyde	30	18	1	11	80	41	39	36
5	Hibernian	29	13	5	10	69	50	19	33
6	Heart of Midlothian	30	14	7	9	75	40	35	33

=== Southern League Cup ===
==== Group stage ====
Round	Date	Opponent	H/A	Score	Hibernian Scorer(s)	Attendance
GA	24 February	Third Lanark	A	1–2		
GA	3 March	Rangers	H	1–1		
GA	10 March	Albion Rovers	H	1–1		
GA	17 March	Third Lanark	H	3–1		
GA	24 March	Rangers	A	0–2		
GA	31 March	Albion Rovers	A	8–1		

==== Group A final table ====
P	Team	Pld	W	D	L	GF	GA	GD	Pts
1	Rangers	6	5	1	0	14	5	9	11
2	Hibernian	6	2	2	2	14	8	6	6
3	Third Lanark	6	2	1	3	11	15	–4	5
4	Albion Rovers	6	0	3	3	9	20	–11	3

=== Summer Cup ===
Round	Date	Opponent	H/A	Score	Hibernian Scorer(s)	Attendance
R1 L1	26 May	St Mirren	A	2–4		
R1 L2	2 June	St Mirren	H	7–0		
R2 L1	9 June	Falkirk	H	3–1		
R2 L2	16 June	Falkirk	A	0–1		
SF	23 June	Celtic	N	2–0		
F	30 June	Partick Thistle	N	0–2		

== See also ==
- List of Hibernian F.C. seasons
