= 1957–58 Hibernian F.C. season =

Hibernian
1957–58 season
- Manager: Hugh Shaw
- Scottish First Division: 9th
- Scottish Cup: SF
- Scottish League Cup: GS
- Highest home attendance: 49,200 (v Heart of Midlothian, 1 January)
- Lowest home attendance: 10,000 (v East Fife, 18 April)
- Average home league attendance: 20,188 (up 2012)

During the 1957–58 season Hibernian, a football club based in Edinburgh, came ninth out of 18 clubs in the Scottish First Division.

== Scottish First Division ==
Match Day	Date	Opponent	H/A	Score	Hibernian Scorer(s)	Attendance
1	7 September	Aberdeen	A	1–0		18,000
2	14 September	Motherwell	H	2–1		20,000
3	21 September	Heart of Midlothian	A	1–3		34,000
4	28 September	Airdrieonians	H	4–0		18,000
5	5 October	Falkirk	A	3–1		16,000
6	12 October	Queen's Park	H	2–0		15,000
7	19 October	Dundee	H	0–3		14,000
8	26 October	Raith Rovers	H	2–2		20,000
9	2 November	St Mirren	A	3–2		12,000
10	9 November	Partick Thistle	H	5–1		30,000
11	16 November	Airdrieonians	A	4–1		8,000
12	23 November	Celtic	H	0–1		40,000
13	30 November	Queen of the South	A	0–3		9,000
14	7 December	Third Lanark	H	4–0		12,000
14	14 December	East Fife	A	3–2		4,000
15	21 December	Kilmarnock	A	4–1		12,562
17	28 December	Clyde	H	1–3		23,000
18	1 January	Heart of Midlothian	H	0–2		49,200
19	2 January	Motherwell	A	1–3		15,000
19	4 January	Aberdeen	H	0–1		16,000
20	11 January	Rangers	A	1–3		42,000
21	18 January	Falkirk	H	3–3		12,000
23	25 January	Queen's Park	A	2–1		2,438
24	22 February	St Mirren	H	5–5		12,000
25	5 March	Partick Thistle	A	0–2		9,000
26	19 March	Celtic	A	0–4		12,000
27	22 March	Queen of the South	H	1–2		12,000
28	29 March	Third Lanark	A	1–1		6,500
29	12 April	Kilmarnock	H	1–2		18,000
30	16 April	Dundee	H	1–1		12,000
31	18 April	East Fife	H	0–1		10,000
32	21 April	Rangers	H	3–1		24,000
33	30 April	Raith Rovers	A	0–2		5,000
34	3 May	Clyde	A	1–2		4,000

=== Final League table ===
P	Team	Pld	W	D	L	GF	GA	GD	Pts
8	Motherwell	34	12	8	14	68	67	1	32
9	Hibernian	34	13	5	16	59	60	–1	31
10	Falkirk	34	11	9	14	64	82	–18	31

=== Scottish League Cup ===
==== Group stage ====
Round	Date	Opponent	H/A	Score	Hibernian Scorer(s)	Attendance
G3	10 August	East Fife	H	4–0		28,000
G3	14 August	Airdrieonians	A	1–4		10,000
G3	17 August	Celtic	H	3–1		35,000
G3	24 August	East Fife	A	2–2		6,000
G3	28 August	Airdrieonians	H	5–1		25,000
G3	30 August	Celtic	A	0–2		50,000

==== Group 3 final table ====
P	Team	Pld	W	D	L	GF	GA	GD	Pts
1	Celtic	6	5	0	1	18	8	10	10
2	Hibernian	6	3	1	2	15	10	5	7
3	Airdrieonians	6	3	0	3	20	13	7	6
4	East Fife	6	0	1	5	6	28	–22	1

=== Scottish Cup ===
Round	Date	Opponent	H/A	Score	Hibernian Scorer(s)	Attendance
R2	15 February	Dundee United	A	0–0		15,543
R2 R	19 February	Dundee United	H	2–0		24,550
R3	1 March	Heart of Midlothian	A	4–3		41,666
R4	15 March	Third Lanark	H	3–2		28,500
SF	5 April	Rangers	N	2–2		76,727
SF R	9 April	Rangers	N	2–1		74,895
F	26 April	Clyde	N	0–1		95,123

== See also ==
- List of Hibernian F.C. seasons
