= 1905–06 Hibernian F.C. season =

Hibernian
1905–06 season
- Manager: Dan McMichael
- Scottish First Division: 11th
- Scottish Cup: 3rd Round
- Average home league attendance: 13,721 (down 618)

During the 1905–06 season Hibernian, a football club based in Edinburgh, finished eleventh out of 16 clubs in the Scottish First Division.

== Scottish First Division ==
Match Day	Date	Opponent	H/A	Score	Hibernian Scorer(s)	Attendance
1	19 August	Airdrieonians	A	0–2		5,000
2	26 August	Dundee	H	2–1		4,500
3	2 September	Celtic	A	0–1		13,000
4	11 September	Rangers	H	1–2		6,000
5	16 September	Aberdeen	A	1–2		7,000
6	18 September	Heart of Midlothian	H	0–3		15,000
7	23 September	St Mirren	A	0–2		5,000
8	25 September	Partick Thistle	A	0–1		3,500
9	30 September	Morton	H	1–2		5,000
10	14 October	Falkirk	A	1–2		4,000
11	21 October	Third Lanark	H	2–1		7,000
12	28 October	Port Glasgow Athletic	A	0–0		3,500
13	4 November	Heart of Midlothian	H	1–0		10,500
14	11 November	Morton	A	1–0		2,000
15	18 November	Queen's Park	H	4–0		5,000
16	25 November	Motherwell	A	2–0		3,000
17	2 December	Partick Thistle	H	1–1		4,000
18	9 December	Kilmarnock	A	2–0		3,500
19	16 December	Falkirk	H	4–1		6,000
20	23 December	Dundee	A	1–1		8,600
21	30 December	Celtic	H	0–1		11,000
22	2 January	Aberdeen	H	1–0		4,000
23	6 January	St Mirren	H	0–1		2,500
24	13 January	Third Lanark	A	1–3		5,200
25	20 January	Airdrieonians	H	0–4		2,500
26	3 February	Motherwell	H	2–3		3,000
27	3 March	Rangers	A	1–1		6,000
28	17 March	Queen's Park	A	2–2		3,500
29	24 March	Port Glasgow Athletic	H	3–1		2,000
30	31 March	Kilmarnock	H	2–1		2,500

=== Final League table ===
P	Team	Pld	W	D	L	GF	GA	GD	Pts
10	Motherwell	30	9	8	13	50	64	–14	26
11	Hibernian	30	10	5	15	35	40	–5	25
12	Aberdeen	30	8	8	14	37	49	–12	24

=== Scottish Cup ===
Round	Date	Opponent	H/A	Score	Hibernian Scorer(s)	Attendance
R1	27 January	Falkirk	A	2–1		8,000
R2	10 February	Partick Thistle	H	1–1		14,000
R2 R	17 February	Partick Thistle	A	1–1		20,000
R2 2R	24 February	Partick Thistle	N	2–1		10,000
R3	10 March	Third Lanark	H	2–3		15,000

== See also ==
- List of Hibernian F.C. seasons
