= 1924–25 Hibernian F.C. season =

Hibernian
1924–25 season
- Manager: Alex Maley
- Scottish First Division: 2nd
- Scottish Cup: R1
- Average home league attendance: 13,842 (up 2,737)

During the 1924–25 season Hibernian, a football club based in Edinburgh, finished second out of 20 clubs in the Scottish First Division.

== Scottish First Division ==
Match Day	Date	Opponent	H/A	Score	Hibernian Scorer(s)	Attendance
1	15 August	Partick Thistle	H	3–2		18,000
2	23 August	Kilmarnock	A	1–0		8,000
3	29 August	Motherwell	H	1–0		20,000
4	6 September	St Johnstone	A	2–2		12,000
5	13 September	Queen's Park	H	2–0		22,000
6	15 September	Celtic	H	2–3		20,000
7	20 September	Raith Rovers	A	3–1		12,000
8	27 September	Morton	H	2–0		12,000
9	4 October	St Mirren	A	3–2		9,000
10	11 October	Ayr United	H	7–0		12,000
11	18 October	Heart of Midlothian	A	0–2		33,500
12	25 October	Dundee	H	4–2		10,000
13	1 November	Falkirk	H	1–2		10,000
14	8 November	Hamilton Academical	A	2–0		12,000
15	15 November	Rangers	A	0–3		6,000
16	22 November	Aberdeen	H	4–1		13,000
17	29 November	Cowdenbeath	A	1–1		10,000
18	6 December	Airdrieonians	H	1–1		8,000
19	13 December	Third Lanark	A	2–1		8,000
20	20 December	St Johnstonen	H	2–0		20,000
21	27 December	Queen's Park	A	0–1		33,000
22	1 January	Heart of Midlothian	H	2–1		25,000
23	3 January	Kilmarnock	H	2–0		13,000
24	5 January	Aberdeen	A	1–0		13,000
25	10 January	Falkirk	A	0–0		8,000
26	17 January	Hamilton Academical	H	2–1		10,000
27	31 January	Celtic	A	1–1		6,000
28	7 February	Third Lanark	H	5–1		8,000
29	11 February	Motherwell	A	1–1		2,000
30	21 February	Cowdenbeath	H	4–1		8,000
31	25 February	Raith Rovers	H	3–0		5,000
32	28 February	Ayr United	A	2–2		4,000
33	11 March	Rangers	H	4–1		23,000
34	14 March	Partick Thistle	A	1–3		30,000
35	24 March	St Mirren	H	5–0		6,000
36	28 March	Morton	A	2–2		500
37	4 April	Dundee	A	0–3		13,000
38	18 April	Airdrieonians	A	0–2		8,000

=== Final League table ===
P	Team	Pld	W	D	L	GF	GA	GD	Pts
2	Airdrieonians	38	25	7	6	85	31	54	57
3	Hibernian	38	22	8	8	78	43	35	52
4	Celtic	38	18	8	12	77	44	33	44

=== Scottish Cup ===
Round	Date	Opponent	H/A	Score	Hibernian Scorer(s)	Attendance
R1	23 January	Aberdeen	H	0–2		20,000

== See also ==
- List of Hibernian F.C. seasons
