= 1929–30 Hibernian F.C. season =

Hibernian
1929–30 season
- Manager: Bobby Templeton
- Scottish First Division: 17th
- Scottish Cup: R3
- Average home league attendance: 8,236 (down 711)

During the 1929–30 season Hibernian, a football club based in Edinburgh, finished nineteenth out of 20 clubs in the Scottish First Division.

== Scottish First Division ==
Match Day	Date	Opponent	H/A	Score	Hibernian Scorer(s)	Attendance
1	10 August	Airdrieonians	H	3–1		8,000
2	17 August	Rangers	A	0–3		18,000
3	24 August	Hamilton Academical	H	1–2		7,000
4	31 August	Ayr United	H	2–3		5,000
5	7 September	Cowdenbeath	H	1–1		15,000
6	14 September	Queen's Park	A	0–2		8,000
7	21 September	Clyde	H	1–1		5,000
8	28 September	Morton	A	2–3		8,000
9	5 October	Motherwell	A	0–3		5,000
10	12 October	Partick Thistle	H	3–0		8,000
11	19 October	Dundee	A	0–4		5,000
12	26 October	Heart of Midlothian	H	1–1		27,000
13	2 November	Celtic	A	0–4		12,000
14	9 November	St Johnstone	H	3–1		5,000
15	16 November	Falkirk	A	1–1		6,000
16	23 November	St Mirren	H	2–2		5,000
17	30 November	Kilmarnock	H	0–0		3,500
18	7 December	Aberdeen	A	0–2		12,000
19	14 December	Dundee United	H	3–0		6,000
20	21 December	Airdrieonians	A	0–3		3,000
21	28 December	Rangers	H	0–2		18,000
22	1 January	Heart of Midlothian	A	1–1		15,000
23	2 January	Dundee	H	0–1		10,000
24	4 January	Hamilton Academical	A	2–3		4,000
25	11 January	Ayr United	H	1–0		6,000
26	25 January	Cowdenbeath	A	0–0		3,000
27	8 February	Clyde	A	2–0		6,000
28	22 February	Motherwell	H	1–1		2,000
29	1 March	Queen's Park	H	6–3		4,000
30	5 March	Partick Thistle	A	0–0		2,500
31	8 March	Celtic	H	0–2		11,000
32	15 March	St Johnstone	A	3–4		2,000
33	22 March	Falkirk	H	1–0		6,000
34	29 March	St Mirren	A	2–1		6,000
35	5 April	Kilmarnock	A	1–3		4,500
36	12 April	Aberdeen	H	0–1		4,000
37	19 April	Dundee United	A	2–2		1,000
38	26 April	Morton	H	0–1		1,000

=== Final League table ===
P	Team	Pld	W	D	L	GF	GA	GD	Pts
16	Cowdenbeath	38	13	7	18	64	74	–10	33
17	Hibernian	38	9	11	18	45	62	–17	29
18	Morton	38	10	7	21	67	95	–28	27

=== Scottish Cup ===
Round	Date	Opponent	H/A	Score	Hibernian Scorer(s)	Attendance
R1	18 January	Leith Amateurs	H	2–0		3,300
R2	1 February	Ayr United	A	3–1		11,000
R3	15 February	Heart of Midlothian	H	1–3		28,000

== See also ==
- List of Hibernian F.C. seasons
