= 1942–43 Hibernian F.C. season =

Hibernian
1942–43 season
- Manager: Willie McCartney
- Southern League: 3rd
- Summer Cup: SF
- Southern League Cup: GS
- Average home league attendance: No Attendances Available (league suspended)

During the 1942–43 season Hibernian, a football club based in Edinburgh, came third out of 16 clubs in the Southern Football League.

== Southern League ==
| Match Day | Date | Opponent | H/A | Score | Hibernian Scorer(s) | Attendance |
|---|---|---|---|---|---|---|
| 1 | 8 August | Albion Rovers | H | 3–1 | | |
| 2 | 15 August | Hamilton Academical | A | 3–1 | | |
| 3 | 22 August | Queen's Park | H | 4–0 | | |
| 4 | 29 August | Dumbarton | A | 4–1 | | 6,500 |
| 5 | 5 September | Heart of Midlothian | H | 2–2 | | 25,000 |
| 6 | 12 September | Rangers | A | 1–1 | | |
| 7 | 19 September | Third Lanark | H | 5–1 | | |
| 8 | 26 September | Celtic | A | 3–0 | | |
| 9 | 3 October | Motherwell | H | 2–1 | | |
| 10 | 10 October | Falkirk | H | 4–0 | | |
| 11 | 17 October | Airdrieonians | A | 5–0 | | |
| 12 | 24 October | Partick Thistle | H | 0–0 | | |
| 13 | 31 October | St Mirren | A | 2–1 | | |
| 14 | 7 November | Morton | H | 2–2 | | |
| 14 | 14 November | Clyde | A | 2–7 | | |
| 15 | 21 November | Albion Rovers | A | 4–1 | | |
| 17 | 28 November | Hamilton Academical | H | 3–1 | | |
| 18 | 5 December | Queen's Park | A | 3–2 | | |
| 19 | 12 December | Dumbarton | H | 4–1 | | 7,000 |
| 20 | 19 December | Third Lanark | A | 2–3 | | |
| 21 | 26 December | Rangers | H | 1–1 | | |
| 22 | 1 January | Heart of Midlothian | A | 4–1 | | 7,000 |
| 23 | 2 January | Motherwell | A | 1–2 | | |
| 24 | 9 January | Celtic | H | 4–0 | | |
| 25 | 16 January | Falkirk | A | 1–3 | | |
| 26 | 23 January | Airdrieonians | H | 7–1 | | |
| 27 | 30 January | Partick Thistle | A | 5–1 | | |
| 28 | 6 February | St Mirren | H | 3–2 | | |
| 29 | 13 February | Morton | A | 0–1 | | |
| 30 | 20 February | Clyde | H | 2–2 | | |

=== Final League table ===
| P | Team | Pld | W | D | L | GF | GA | GD | Pts |
|---|---|---|---|---|---|---|---|---|---|
| 2 | Morton | 30 | 20 | 5 | 5 | 81 | 48 | 33 | 45 |
| 3 | Hibernian | 30 | 19 | 6 | 5 | 86 | 40 | 46 | 44 |
| 4 | Clyde | 30 | 17 | 5 | 8 | 78 | 55 | 23 | 39 |

=== Southern League Cup ===
==== Group stage ====
| Round | Date | Opponent | H/A | Score | Hibernian Scorer(s) | Attendance |
|---|---|---|---|---|---|---|
| GD | 27 February | Celtic | A | 1–2 | | |
| GD | 6 March | St Mirren | H | 2–1 | | |
| GD | 13 March | Rangers | H | 0–2 | | |
| GD | 20 March | Celtic | H | 2–1 | | |
| GD | 27 March | St Mirren | A | 3–1 | | |
| GD | 3 April | Rangers | A | 0–1 | | |

==== Group D final table ====
| P | Team | Pld | W | D | L | GF | GA | GD | Pts |
|---|---|---|---|---|---|---|---|---|---|
| 1 | Rangers | 6 | 6 | 0 | 0 | 14 | 1 | 13 | 12 |
| 2 | Hibernian | 6 | 3 | 0 | 3 | 8 | 6 | 2 | 8 |
| 3 | Celtic | 6 | 2 | 0 | 4 | 6 | 13 | –7 | 4 |
| 4 | St Mirren | 6 | 1 | 0 | 4 | 8 | 14 | –6 | 0 |

=== Summer Cup ===
| Round | Date | Opponent | H/A | Score | Hibernian Scorer(s) | Attendance |
|---|---|---|---|---|---|---|
| R1 L1 | 29 May | Partick Thistle | H | 7–0 | | |
| R1 L2 | 5 June | Partick Thistle | A | 5–2 | | |
| R2 L1 | 12 June | Queen's Park | A | 2–1 | | |
| R2 L2 | 19 June | Queen's Park | H | 4–0 | | |
| SF | 26 June | Rangers | N | 1–3 | | |

== See also ==
- List of Hibernian F.C. seasons
