= 1904–05 Hibernian F.C. season =

Hibernian
1904–05 season
- Manager: Dan McMichael
- Scottish First Division: 5th
- Scottish Cup: 1st Round
- Average home league attendance: 13,721 (down 618)

During the 1904–05 season Hibernian, a football club based in Edinburgh, finished fifth out of 14 clubs in the Scottish First Division.

== Scottish First Division ==
Match Day	Date	Opponent	H/A	Score	Hibernian Scorer(s)	Attendance
1	20 August	Queen's Park	H	1–1		5,000
2	27 August	Rangers	A	0–4		12,000
3	3 September	St Mirren	H	2–0		5,000
4	10 September	Airdrieonians	A	1–1		7,000
5	17 September	Dundee	H	1–1		7,000
6	19 September	Rangers	H	1–2		7,000
7	24 September	Queen's Park	A	2–4		3,000
8	26 September	Partick Thistle	A	1–0		4,000
9	1 October	Kilmarnock	A	1–2		4,000
10	15 October	Motherwell	H	2–0		1,500
11	22 October	Port Glasgow Athletic	A	1–1		7,000
12	29 October	Heart of Midlothian	H	3–0		3,000
13	5 November	St Mirren	A	0–2		4,500
14	12 November	Celtic	H	2–2		7,800
15	19 November	Morton	A	2–2		4,000
16	26 November	Kilmarnock	H	2–1		2,500
17	3 December	Dundee	A	1–4		6,000
18	10 December	Airdrieonians	H	3–2		2,500
19	17 December	Motherwell	A	2–1		6,000
20	24 December	Third Lanark	H	1–1		3,000
21	31 December	Third Lanark	A	0–1		3,000
22	2 January	Heart of Midlothian	A	0–1		9,000
23	14 January	Morton	H	4–0		2,000
24	21 January	Celtic	A	0–2		6,000
25	18 February	Port Glasgow Athletic	H	1–1		2,000
26	18 March	Partick Thistle	H	4–0		5,000

=== Final League table ===
P	Team	Pld	W	D	L	GF	GA	GD	Pts
4	Airdrieonians	26	11	5	10	38	45	–7	27
5	Hibernian	26	9	8	9	39	39	0	26
6	Partick Thistle	26	12	2	12	36	56	–20	26

=== Scottish Cup ===
Round	Date	Opponent	H/A	Score	Hibernian Scorer(s)	Attendance
R1	28 January	Partick Thistle	H	1–1		14,000
R1 R	4 February	Partick Thistle	A	2–4		16,000

== See also ==
- List of Hibernian F.C. seasons
