= 1958–59 Hibernian F.C. season =

Hibernian
1958–59 season
- Manager: Hugh Shaw
- Scottish First Division: 10th
- Scottish Cup: R4
- Scottish League Cup: GS
- Highest home attendance: 33,000 (v Motherwell, 3 January)
- Lowest home attendance: 4000 (v Stirling Albion, 18 April)
- Average home league attendance: 14,618 (down 5570)

During the 1958–59 season Hibernian, a football club based in Edinburgh, came tenth out of 18 clubs in the Scottish First Division.

== Scottish First Division ==
Match Day	Date	Opponent	H/A	Score	Hibernian Scorer(s)	Attendance
1	20 August	Kilmarnock	A	1–1		9,955
2	6 September	Heart of Midlothian	H	0–4		29,500
3	13 September	Motherwell	A	5–2		31,500
4	20 September	Queen of the South	H	4–0		9,000
5	27 September	Raith Rovers	A	2–5		15,000
6	4 October	Falkirk	H	2–3		10,000
7	11 October	Clyde	H	2–1		12,000
8	18 October	Aberdeen	A	0–4		20,000
9	25 October	Airdrieonians	H	2–3		9,000
10	1 November	Rangers	A	0–4		17,000
11	8 November	Third Lanark	H	4–4		14,000
12	15 November	Dunfermline Athletic	A	2–1		14,000
13	22 November	St Mirren	A	1–2		10,000
14	29 November	Celtic	H	3–2		22,000
14	6 December	Dundee	A	1–2		13,000
15	13 December	Partick Thistle	H	4–0		13,000
17	20 December	Stirling Albion	A	3–0		4,500
18	27 December	Kilmarnock	H	4–3		12,000
19	1 January	Heart of Midlothian	A	3–1		35,000
19	3 January	Motherwell	H	2–2		33,000
20	10 January	Queen of the South	A	4–1		5,000
21	21 January	Raith Rovers	H	4–2		6,000
23	24 January	Falkirk	A	0–1		13,000
24	7 February	Clyde	A	1–4		5,000
25	18 February	Aberdeen	H	1–0		14,000
26	21 February	Airdireonians	A	3–4		5,000
27	4 March	Rangers	H	2–2		32,000
28	7 March	Third Lanark	A	2–2		7,000
29	18 March	Dunfermlne Athletic	H	3–1		8,000
30	21 March	St Mirren	H	0–1		8,000
31	28 March	Celtic	A	0–3		17,000
32	4 April	Dundee	H	1–2		10,000
33	11 April	Partick Thistle	A	2–2		7,000
34	18 April	Stirling Albion	H	0–1		4,000

=== Final League table ===
P	Team	Pld	W	D	L	GF	GA	GD	Pts
9	Partick Thistle	34	14	6	14	59	66	–7	34
10	Hibernian	34	13	6	15	68	70	–2	32
11	Third Lanark	34	11	10	13	74	83	–9	32

=== Scottish League Cup ===
==== Group stage ====
Round	Date	Opponent	H/A	Score	Hibernian Scorer(s)	Attendance
G4	9 August	Falkirk	H	3–2		15,700
G4	13 August	Aberdeen	A	1–2		15,000
G4	16 August	Kilmarnock	H	0–3		17,000
G4	23 August	Falkirk	A	4–0		9,000
G4	27 August	Aberdeen	H	4–2		16,000
G4	30 August	Kilmarnock	A	1–2		15,700

==== Group 4 final table ====
P	Team	Pld	W	D	L	GF	GA	GD	Pts
1	Kilmarnock	6	4	0	2	12	6	6	8'
2	Hibernian	6	4	0	2	14	10	4	8
3	Aberdeen	6	2	1	3	11	11	0	5
4	Falkirk	6	1	1	4	7	17	–10	3

=== Scottish Cup ===
Round	Date	Opponent	H/A	Score	Hibernian Scorer(s)	Attendance
R1	31 January	Raith Rovers	A	1–1		15,176
R1 R	9 February	Raith Rovers	H	2–1		21,000
R2	14 February	Falkirk	H	3–1		20,600
R3	28 February	Partick Thistle	H	4–1		27,300
R4	14 March	Third Lanark	A	1–2		20,000

== See also ==
- List of Hibernian F.C. seasons
