= 1917–18 Hibernian F.C. season =

Hibernian
1917–18 season
- Manager: Dan McMichael
- Scottish First Division: 16th
- Average home league attendance: 13,721 (down 618)

During the 1917–18 season Hibernian, a football club based in Edinburgh, finished sixteenth out of 18 clubs in the Scottish First Division.

== Scottish First Division ==
Match Day	Date	Opponent	H/A	Score	Hibernian Scorer(s)	Attendance
1	18 August	Hamilton Academical	A	0–1		6,000
2	25 August	Kilmarnock	H	0–3		7,000
3	1 September	Heart of Midlothian	A	0–1		7,500
4	8 September	Clydebank	H	0–1		7,000
5	15 September	Rangers	A	0–3		10,000
6	22 September	Airdrieonians	H	3–1		5,000
7	29 September	Partick Thistle	A	2–2		10,000
8	6 October	Dumbarton	H	0–3		4,000
9	13 October	Queen's Park	H	4–2		5,000
10	20 October	Clyde	A	5–2		3,000
11	27 October	Ayr United	A	2–2		2,000
12	3 November	Motherwell	H	2–2		5,000
13	10 November	Third Lanark	A	0–1		3,000
14	17 November	Morton	H	2–2		5,000
15	24 November	Celtic	A	0–2		7,000
16	1 December	St Mirren	H	3–1		4,000
17	8 December	Dumbarton	A	0–1		2,000
18	15 December	Hamilton Academical	H	1–1		5,000
19	22 December	Falkirk	A	2–2		3,000
20	29 December	Partick Thistle	H	2–1		5,000
21	5 January	Kilmarnock	A	1–3		4,000
22	12 January	Clyde	H	2–0		4,000
23	26 January	Morton	A	1–1		5,000
24	2 February	Heart of Midlothian	H	1–3		8,000
25	9 February	Rangers	H	0–1		8,000
26	16 February	Airdrieonians	A	0–3		1,000
27	23 February	Queen's Park	A	0–2		5,000
28	9 March	Third Lanark	H	4–1		7,000
29	16 March	Clydebank	A	0–2		5,000
30	23 March	Falkirk	H	2–1		6,000
31	30 March	Motherwell	A	1–2		5,000
32	6 April	Celtic	H	0–2		11,000
33	13 April	St Mirren	A	1–1		3,000
34	20 April	Ayr United	H	1–1		4,000

=== Final League table ===
P	Team	Pld	W	D	L	GF	GA	GD	Pts
15	Airdrieonians	34	10	6	18	46	58	–12	26
16	Hibernian	34	8	9	17	42	57	–15	25
17	Clyde	34	9	2	23	37	72	–14	20

== See also ==
- List of Hibernian F.C. seasons
