= 1916–17 Hibernian F.C. season =

Hibernian
1916–17 season
- Manager: Dan McMichael
- Scottish First Division: 16th
- Average home league attendance: 13,721 (down 618)

During the 1916–17 season Hibernian, a football club based in Edinburgh, finished sixteenth out of 20 clubs in the Scottish First Division.

== Scottish First Division ==
| Match Day | Date | Opponent | H/A | Score | Hibernian Scorer(s) | Attendance |
|---|---|---|---|---|---|---|
| 1 | 19 August | Airdrieonians | H | 1–1 | | 4,000 |
| 2 | 26 August | Celtic | A | 1–3 | | 8,000 |
| 3 | 2 September | Hamilton Academical | H | 4–3 | | 4,000 |
| 4 | 9 September | Dumbarton | A | 1–2 | | 2,000 |
| 5 | 16 September | Dundee | H | 1–2 | | 3,000 |
| 6 | 18 September | Heart of Midlothian | A | 1–2 | | 5,500 |
| 7 | 23 September | Kilmarnock | A | 3–1 | | 4,000 |
| 8 | 30 September | Third Lanark | H | 1–1 | | 3,000 |
| 9 | 7 October | St Mirren | A | 1–1 | | 4,000 |
| 10 | 14 October | Ayr United | H | 1–4 | | 1,000 |
| 11 | 21 October | Falkirk | A | 1–0 | | 3,000 |
| 12 | 28 October | Clyde | H | 1–1 | | 3,000 |
| 13 | 4 November | Motherwell | A | 1–1 | | 4,000 |
| 14 | 11 November | Rangers | H | 0–0 | | 10,000 |
| 15 | 18 November | Raith Rovers | H | 3–3 | | 4,000 |
| 16 | 25 November | Ayr United | A | 1–2 | | 1,000 |
| 17 | 2 December | Morton | A | 1–1 | | 5,000 |
| 18 | 9 December | Aberdeen | H | 3–3 | | 4,000 |
| 19 | 16 December | Rangers | A | 1–5 | | 7,000 |
| 20 | 23 December | Queen's Park | A | 1–4 | | 2,000 |
| 21 | 30 December | Morton | H | 2–4 | | 3,000 |
| 22 | 2 January | Dundee | A | 1–3 | | 4,000 |
| 23 | 6 January | St Mirren | H | 2–1 | | 5,000 |
| 24 | 13 January | Raith Rovers | A | 1–2 | | 2,000 |
| 25 | 20 January | Kilmarnock | H | 2–1 | | 4,000 |
| 26 | 27 January | Dumbarton | H | 3–1 | | 4,000 |
| 27 | 3 February | Falkirk | H | 1–2 | | 5,000 |
| 28 | 10 February | Clyde | A | 2–1 | | 4,000 |
| 29 | 17 February | Motherwell | H | 2–3 | | 5,000 |
| 30 | 24 February | Hamilton Academical | A | 1–4 | | 4,000 |
| 31 | 3 March | Third Lanark | A | 1–1 | | 4,000 |
| 32 | 10 March | Partick Thistle | A | 3–0 | | 3,000 |
| 33 | 17 March | Queen's Park | H | 5–1 | | 4,000 |
| 34 | 24 March | Partick Thistle | H | 1–0 | | 4,000 |
| 35 | 31 March | Airdrieonians | A | 1–3 | | 2,000 |
| 36 | 14 April | Celtic | H | 0–1 | | 8,000 |
| 37 | 16 April | Heart of Midlothian | H | 0–2 | | 5,000 |
| 38 | 24 March | Aberdeen | A | 1–2 | | 5,000 |

=== Final League table ===
| P | Team | Pld | W | D | L | GF | GA | GD | Pts |
|---|---|---|---|---|---|---|---|---|---|
| 16 | Dundee | 38 | 13 | 4 | 21 | 58 | 71 | –13 | 30 |
| 16 | Hibernian | 38 | 10 | 10 | 18 | 57 | 72 | –15 | 30 |
| 18 | Queen's Park | 38 | 11 | 7 | 20 | 56 | 81 | –25 | 29 |

== See also ==
- List of Hibernian F.C. seasons
