= 1936–37 Hibernian F.C. season =

Hibernian
1936–37 season
- Manager: Willie McCartney
- Scottish First Division: 17th
- Scottish Cup: R2
- Average home league attendance: 9,459 (down 267)

During the 1936–37 season Hibernian, a football club based in Edinburgh, came seventeenth out of 20 clubs in the Scottish First Division.

== Scottish First Division ==
Match Day	Date	Opponent	H/A	Score	Hibernian Scorer(s)	Attendance
1	8 August	Aberdeen	H	1–3		4,254
2	15 August	Albion Rovers	A	0–4		5,000
3	19 August	Aberdeen	A	1–1		15,000
4	22 August	Queen's Park	H	2–3		10,000
5	29 August	Rangers	A	0–4		12,000
6	5 September	Hamilton Academical	H	5–4		12,000
7	9 September	Albion Rovers	H	1–1		8,000
8	12 September	Kilmarnock	A	2–3		5,000
9	19 September	Heart of Midlothian	H	3–3		27,471
10	26 September	Clyde	A	3–1		8,000
11	3 October	Queen of the South	H	2–2		5,000
12	10 October	St Johnstone	A	1–3		3,500
13	17 October	St Mirren	H	0–0		7,000
14	24 October	Celtic	A	1–5		20,000
15	31 October	Third Lanark	H	0–1		9,000
16	7 November	Motherwell	A	4–3		7,000
17	14 November	Dunfermline Athletic	A	3–2		10,000
18	21 November	Arbroath	H	4–1		9,000
19	28 November	Falkirk	A	2–2		9,000
20	5 December	Dundee	A	1–3		6,000
21	12 December	Partick Thistle	H	2–2		9,000
22	19 December	Queen's Park	A	0–2		6,000
23	26 December	Rangers	H	1–4		22,000
24	1 January	Heart of Midlothian	A	2–3		38,908
25	2 January	St Johnstone	H	3–3		4,000
26	9 January	Hamilton Academical	A	4–1		5,000
27	16 January	Kilmarnock	H	0–0		6,000
28	23 January	Queen of the South	A	1–0		4,000
29	6 February	Clyde	H	0–1		8,000
30	20 February	St Mirren	A	3–1		6,000
31	6 March	Celtic	H	2–2		18,000
32	20 March	Motherwell	H	1–2		10,000
33	27 March	Dunfermline Athletic	H	0–0		8,000
34	29 March	Third Lanark	A	1–1		3,000
35	3 April	Arbroath	A	1–0		2,000
36	10 April	Falkirk	A	1–4		6,000
37	19 April	Dundee	H	0–0		3,000
38	21 April	Partick Thistle	A	1–3		3,000

=== Final League table ===
P	Team	Pld	W	D	L	GF	GA	GD	Pts
16	St Mirren	38	11	7	20	68	81	–13	29
17	Hibernian	38	6	13	9	54	83	–29	25
18	Queen of the South	38	8	8	22	49	95	–46	24

=== Scottish Cup ===
Round	Date	Opponent	H/A	Score	Hibernian Scorer(s)	Attendance
R1	2 February	Alloa Athletic	A	5–2		4,200
R2	13 February	Hamilton Academical	A	1–2		9,150

== See also ==
- List of Hibernian F.C. seasons
