= 1903–04 Hibernian F.C. season =

Hibernian
1903–04 season
- Manager: Phil Kelso
- Scottish First Division: 10th
- Scottish Cup: 2nd Round
- Average home league attendance: 13,721 (down 618)

During the 1903–04 season Hibernian, a football club based in Edinburgh, finished tenth out of 14 clubs in the Scottish First Division.

== Scottish First Division ==
Match Day	Date	Opponent	H/A	Score	Hibernian Scorer(s)	Attendance
1	15 August	Port Glasgow Athletic	A	1–3		3,000
2	22 August	Motherwell	H	2–1		4,500
3	29 August	Airdrieonians	A	2–0		6,500
4	5 September	Celtic	H	0–2		9,500
5	12 September	Kilmarnock	A	0–0		3,000
6	19 September	St Mirren	H	2–1		5,000
7	26 September	Celtic	A	0–1		8,000
8	3 October	Airdrieonians	H	4–0		5,000
9	10 October	Heart of Midlothian	A	0–2		12,500
10	17 October	Third Lanark	H	0–2		12,000
11	24 October	Port Glasgow Athletic	H	4–1		3,000
12	31 October	Morton	A	1–3		5,000
13	7 November	St Mirren	A	0–3		3,500
14	14 November	Rangers	A	1–1		9,500
15	21 November	Morton	H	2–0		3,000
16	28 November	Dundee	H	0–1		1,500
17	12 December	Dundee	A	2–1		8,000
18	19 December	Queen's Park	H	1–1		
19	26 December	Rangers	H	1–2		6,000
20	9 January	Partick Thistle	A	1–3		3,000
21	30 January	Motherwell	A	0–1		6,000
22	13 February	Queen's Park	A	1–3		3,000
23	20 February	Heart of Midlothian	H	2–4		4,000
24	27 February	Partick Thistle	H	2–2		3,000
25	12 March	Kilmarnock	H	2–2		2,000
26	30 April	Third Lanark	A	0–2		

=== Final League table ===
P	Team	Pld	W	D	L	GF	GA	GD	Pts
9	Port Glasgow Athletic	26	8	4	14	32	49	–17	20
10	Hibernian	26	7	5	14	29	40	–11	19
11	Morton	26	7	4	15	32	53	–21	18

=== Scottish Cup ===
Round	Date	Opponent	H/A	Score	Hibernian Scorer(s)	Attendance
R1	23 January	Airdrieonians	H	2–1		6,500
R2	6 February	Rangers	A	1–2		17,000

== See also ==
- List of Hibernian F.C. seasons
