= 1938–39 Hibernian F.C. season =

Hibernian
1938–39 season
- Manager: Willie McCartney
- Scottish First Division: 13th
- Scottish Cup: SF
- Average home league attendance: 13,000 (up 1,837)

During the 1938–39 season Hibernian, a football club based in Edinburgh, came thirteenth out of 20 clubs in the Scottish First Division.

== Scottish First Division ==
Match Day	Date	Opponent	H/A	Score	Hibernian Scorer(s)	Attendance
1	11 August	Hamilton Academical	H	2–2		20,000
2	20 August	Kilmarnock	A	1–0		8,000
3	24 August	Hamilton Academical	A	1–4		4,000
4	27 August	Queen of the South	H	2–3		15,000
5	3 September	Clyde	A	0–3		10,000
6	10 September	Heart of Midlothian	H	4–0		30,000
7	14 September	Kilmarnock	H	0–1		10,000
8	17 September	Albion Rovers	A	1–0		20,000
9	24 September	Aberdeen	H	5–0		14,000
10	1 October	Rangers	A	2–5		15,000
11	8 October	Queen's Park	H	3–1		8,000
12	15 October	Raith Rovers	A	2–1		12,000
13	22 October	Ayr United	A	1–3		5,500
14	29 October	St Johnstone	H	5–2		8,000
15	5 November	Falkirk	H	3–0		10,000
16	12 November	Arbroath	A	4–2		3,000
17	19 November	Partick Thistle	H	1–2		8,000
18	26 November	St Mirren	H	6–1		12,000
19	3 December	Celtic	A	4–5		20,000
20	10 December	Third Lanark	H	1–1		14,000
21	17 December	Motherwell	A	2–3		6,000
22	24 December	Queen of the South	A	1–2		6,500
23	31 December	Clyde	H	1–1		14,000
24	2 January	Heart of Midlothian	A	1–0		45,061
25	3 January	Raith Rovers	H	2–1		12,000
26	7 January	Aberdeen	A	1–6		16,000
27	14 January	Rangers	H	1–1		31,000
28	28 January	Queen's Park	A	2–3		8,779
29	11 February	Albion Rovers	H	1–2		9,000
30	25 February	Ayr United	H	2–3		5,000
31	8 March	St Johnstone	A	1–2		2,000
32	11 March	Falkirk	A	1–1		2,000
33	18 March	Arbroath	H	1–1		7,000
34	28 March	Partick Thistle	A	0–4		5,000
35	1 April	St Mirren	A	0–0		7,000
36	8 April	Celtic	H	1–0		12,000
37	21 April	Third Lanark	A	0–2		3,000
38	29 April	Motherwell	H	2–1		8,000

=== Final League table ===
P	Team	Pld	W	D	L	GF	GA	GD	Pts
12	Motherwell	38	16	5	17	82	86	–4	37
13	Hibernian	38	14	7	17	68	69	–1	35
14	Ayr United	38	13	9	16	76	83	–7	35

=== Scottish Cup ===
Round	Date	Opponent	H/A	Score	Hibernian Scorer(s)	Attendance
R1	21 January	Forfar Athletic	A	3–0		3,500
R2	4 February	Kilmarnock	H	3–1		32,394
R3	18 February	Bye into Round 4				
R4	4 March	Alloa Athletic	H	3–1		27,441
SF	25 March	Clyde	N	0–1		39,812

== See also ==
- List of Hibernian F.C. seasons
