= 1888–89 Hibernian F.C. season =

Hibernian
1888–89 season
- Scottish Cup: R1

Season 1888–89 was the 13th season in which Hibernian competed at a Scottish national level, entering the Scottish Cup for the 14th time.

== Overview ==
Hibs reached the first round of the Scottish Cup, losing 2–1 to Mossend Swifts.

== Results ==
All results are written with Hibs' score first.

=== Scottish Cup ===
Date	Round	Opponent	Venue	Result	Attendance	Scorers
1 September 1888	R1	Mossend Swifts	H	1–2	2,000	

== See also ==
- List of Hibernian F.C. seasons
