= 1910–11 Hibernian F.C. season =

Hibernian
1910–11 season
- Manager: Dan McMichael
- Scottish First Division: 9th
- Scottish Cup: 1st Round
- Average home league attendance: 13,721 (down 618)

During the 1910–11 season Hibernian, a football club based in Edinburgh, finished ninth out of 18 clubs in the Scottish First Division.

== Scottish First Division ==
Match Day	Date	Opponent	H/A	Score	Hibernian Scorer(s)	Attendance
1	20 August	Third Lanark	H	2–1		5,000
2	27 August	Dundee	A	1–1		8,000
3	3 September	St Mirren	H	2–0		6,000
4	17 September	Partick Thistle	H	1–0		6,000
5	19 September	Celtic	H	0–4		12,000
6	24 September	Raith Rovers	A	3–1		5,000
7	26 September	Rangers	A	0–4		14,000
8	1 October	Hamilton Academial	H	2–1		4,000
9	8 October	Clyde	A	0–2		6,000
10	15 October	Queen's Park	H	1–0		2,000
11	22 October	Heart of Midlothian	A	0–2		13,500
12	29 October	Airdrieonians	A	0–3		2,000
13	5 November	Falkirk	H	1–3		5,000
14	12 November	Morton	H	3–3		4,000
15	19 November	Motherwell	A	2–1		4,000
16	26 November	Kilmarnock	H	0–1		4,000
17	3 December	Hamilton Academical	A	1–1		3,000
18	10 December	Aberdeen	H	2–1		7,000
19	17 December	Queen's Park	A	1–0		4,000
20	24 December	Airdrieonians	H	2–0		5,000
21	31 December	Partick Thistle	A	1–2		8,000
22	2 January	Heart of Midlothian	H	1–0		12,000
23	7 January	Third Lanark	A	3–0		4,000
24	14 January	Kilmarnock	A	1–3		3,200
25	21 January	Morton	A	2–2		7,000
26	11 February	St Mirren	A	2–1		4,000
27	18 February	Dundee	H	4–1		3,000
28	25 February	Motherwell	H	2–1		6,000
29	4 March	Clyde	H	1–1		6,000
30	11 March	Rangers	H	1–3		12,000
31	18 March	Falkirk	A	1–2		5,000
32	25 March	Celtic	H	2–0		4,000
33	8 April	Aberdeen	A	1–1		7,000
34	22 April	Raith Rovers	H	2–0		4,000

=== Final League table ===
P	Team	Pld	W	D	L	GF	GA	GD	Pts
8	Clyde	34	14	11	9	45	36	9	39
9	Hibernian	34	15	6	13	44	48	–4	36
10	Kilmarnock	34	12	10	12	42	45	–3	34

=== Scottish Cup ===
Round	Date	Opponent	H/A	Score	Hibernian Scorer(s)	Attendance
R1	28 January	Dundee	A	1–2		22,000

== See also ==
- List of Hibernian F.C. seasons
