= 1937–38 Hibernian F.C. season =

Hibernian
1937–38 season
- Manager: Willie McCartney
- Scottish First Division: 10th
- Scottish Cup: R1
- Average home league attendance: 11,163 (up 1,704)

During the 1937–38 season Hibernian, a football club based in Edinburgh, came tenth out of 20 clubs in the Scottish First Division.

== Scottish First Division ==
Match Day	Date	Opponent	H/A	Score	Hibernian Scorer(s)	Attendance
1	14 August	Queen's Park	A	1–1		4,254
2	21 August	Rangers	H	0–0		31,000
3	25 August	Queen's Park	H	0–2		6,000
4	27 August	Hamilton Academical	A	0–4		5,000
5	4 September	Kilmarnock	H	1–1		12,000
6	11 September	Heart of Midlothian	A	2–3		29,518
7	15 September	Rangers	A	0–2		12,000
8	18 September	Clyde	H	6–3		10,000
9	25 September	Queen of the South	A	2–3		6,000
10	2 October	Morton	H	4–2		10,000
11	9 October	Aberdeen	A	0–5		10,000
12	16 October	Arbroath	H	5–0		9,000
13	23 October	Third Lanark	A	0–1		5,000
14	30 October	Motherwell	H	1–1		15,000
15	6 November	Ayr United	H	3–0		8,000
16	13 November	St Johnstone	A	0–2		3,000
17	20 November	Falkirk	A	0–0		10,000
18	27 November	Dundee	H	2–1		4,000
19	4 December	Partick Thistle	A	0–4		8,000
20	11 December	St Mirren	A	0–1		14,000
21	18 December	Celtic	H	0–3		20,000
22	25 December	Hamilton Academical	H	1–1		6,000
23	29 December	Kilmarnock	A	3–0		5,000
24	1 January	Heart of Midlothian	H	2–2		37,606
25	3 January	Arbroath	A	3–3		4,000
26	8 January	Clyde	A	1–1		5,000
27	15 January	Queen of the South	H	2–0		8,000
28	29 January	Morton	A	4–2		4,000
29	5 February	Aberdeen	H	1–1		11,000
30	19 February	Third Lanark	H	2–2		6,000
31	26 February	Motherwell	A	0–1		2,000
32	12 March	Ayr United	A	1–1		9,000
33	19 March	St Johnstone	H	2–2		5,000
34	26 March	Falkirk	H	2–4		5,000
35	2 April	Dundee	A	2–1		5,000
36	9 April	Partick Thistle	H	2–1		4,000
37	16 April	St Mirren	H	2–1		4,500
38	30 April	Celtic	A	0–3		5,000

=== Final League table ===
P	Team	Pld	W	D	L	GF	GA	GD	Pts
9	Third Lanark	38	11	13	14	68	73	–5	35
10	Hibernian	38	11	13	14	57	65	–8	35
11	Arbroath	38	11	13	14	58	79	–21	35

=== Scottish Cup ===
Round	Date	Opponent	H/A	Score	Hibernian Scorer(s)	Attendance
R1	22 January	Edinburgh City	H	2–3		8,920

== See also ==
- List of Hibernian F.C. seasons
