= 1914–15 Hibernian F.C. season =

Hibernian
1914–15 season
- Manager: Dan McMichael
- Scottish First Division: 10th
- Average home league attendance: 13,721 (down 618)

During the 1914–15 season Hibernian, a football club based in Edinburgh, finished tenth out of 20 clubs in the Scottish First Division.

== Scottish First Division ==
Match Day	Date	Opponent	H/A	Score	Hibernian Scorer(s)	Attendance
1	15 August	Clyde	A	0–1		12,000
2	22 August	Falkirk	H	1–1		8,000
3	29 August	Motherwell	A	0–3		6,000
4	5 September	Airdrieonians	H	1–0		7,000
5	12 September	Raith Rovers	A	1–1		6,000
6	19 September	Celtic	H	1–1		14,000
7	21 September	Clyde	H	3–1		4,000
8	26 September	Morton	A	0–0		6,000
9	28 September	Rangers	A	2–4		14,000
10	3 October	Ayr United	H	0–4		7,000
11	10 October	St Mirren	A	2–4		6,000
12	17 October	Hamilton Academical	H	0–2		4,000
13	24 October	Kilmarnock	A	1–5		6,000
14	31 October	Aberdeen	H	1–2		3,000
15	7 November	Dumbarton	H	2–2		3,000
16	14 November	Queen's Park	A	2–0		4,000
17	21 November	Dundee	H	2–0		1,500
18	28 November	Partick Thistle	H	4–1		3,000
19	5 December	Heart of Midlothian	A	1–3		12,000
20	12 December	Third Lanark	A	2–2		3,000
21	19 December	St Mirren	H	3–2		3,000
22	26 December	Dundee	A	4–2		3,500
23	2 January	Kilmarnock	H	3–1		3,000
24	4 January	Ayr United	A	1–2		4,000
25	9 January	Airdrieonians	A	3–1		5,000
26	16 January	Partick Thistle	A	1–3		12,000
27	23 January	Motherwell	H	1–2		3,000
28	30 January	Rangers	H	1–2		8,000
29	6 February	Hamilton Academical	A	2–2		4,000
30	13 February	Raith Rovers	H	2–1		4,000
31	20 February	Aberdeen	A	0–0		8,500
32	27 February	Heart of Midlothian	H	2–2		16,000
33	6 March	Celtic	A	1–5		13,000
34	13 March	Morton	H	1–1		5,000
35	20 March	Dumbarton	A	0–1		3,000
36	27 March	Falkirk	A	0–0		4,000
37	3 April	Third Lanark	H	4–2		3,000
38	10 April	Queen's Park	H	4–0		3,000

=== Final League table ===
P	Team	Pld	W	D	L	GF	GA	GD	Pts
9	St Mirren	38	14	8	16	56	65	–9	36
10	Hibernian	38	12	11	15	59	66	–7	35
11	Airdrieonians	38	14	7	17	54	60	–6	35

== See also ==
- List of Hibernian F.C. seasons
