= 1943–44 Hibernian F.C. season =

Hibernian
1943–44 season
- Manager: Willie McCartney
- Southern League: 3rd
- Summer Cup: R2
- Southern League Cup: F
- Average home league attendance: No Attendances Available (league suspended))

During the 1943–44 season Hibernian, a football club based in Edinburgh, came third out of 16 clubs in the Southern Football League.

== Southern League ==
Match Day	Date	Opponent	H/A	Score	Hibernian Scorer(s)	Attendance
1	14 August	Rangers	A	0–4		
2	21 August	Albion Rovers	H	3–0		
3	28 August	Hamilton Academical	A	2–1		
4	4 September	Queen's Park	H	2–1		
5	11 September	Heart of Midlothian	A	1–0		22,000
6	18 September	Dumbarton	H	4–3		
7	25 September	Clyde	A	1–2		
8	2 October	Morton	H	2–0		
9	9 October	Falkirk	A	5–3		
10	16 October	St Mirren	H	4–1		
11	23 October	Third Lanark	A	2–0		
12	30 October	Celtic	H	2–2		
13	6 November	Partick Thistle	A	1–3		
14	13 November	Motherwell	H	3–3		
14	20 November	Airdrieonians	A	5–2		
15	27 November	Rangers	H	3–4		
17	4 December	Albion Rovers	A	4–2		
18	11 December	Hamilton Academical	H	3–5		
19	18 December	Queen's Park	A	2–4		5,000
20	25 December	Dumbarton	A	1–1		
21	1 January	Heart of Midlothian	H	0–1		20,000
22	3 January	Airdireonians	H	1–2		
23	8 January	Clyde	H	3–1		
24	15 January	Morton	A	1–3		
25	22 January	Falkirk	H	4–3		
26	29 January	St Mirren	A	2–1		
27	5 February	Third Lanark	H	6–0		
28	12 February	Celtic	A	2–2		
29	15 February	Motherwell	A	1–0		
30	19 February	Partick Thistle	H	2–0		

=== Final League table ===
P	Team	Pld	W	D	L	GF	GA	GD	Pts
2	Celtic	30	18	7	5	71	43	28	43
3	Hibernian	30	17	4	9	72	54	18	38
4	Heart of Midlothian	30	14	7	9	67	50	17	35

=== Southern League Cup ===
==== Group stage ====
Round	Date	Opponent	H/A	Score	Hibernian Scorer(s)	Attendance
GC	4 March	Third Lanark	A	4–0		
GC	11 March	Albion Rovers	H	2–1		
GC	18 March	Morton	A	2–2		
GC	25 March	Third Lanark	H	4–0		
GC	1 April	Albion Rovers	A	2–0		
GC	8 April	Morton	H	6–3		

==== Group C final table ====
P	Team	Pld	W	D	L	GF	GA	GD	Pts
1	Hibernian	6	5	1	0	20	6	14	11
2	Morton	6	3	2	1	19	13	6	8
3	Albion Rovers	6	1	2	3	11	15	–4	4
4	Third Lanark	6	0	1	5	5	21	–16	1

==== Knockout stage ====
Round	Date	Opponent	H/A	Score	Hibernian Scorer(s)	Attendance
SF	6 May	Clyde	N	5–2		
F	20 May	Rangers	N	0–0 (Hibs win 6–5 on corner kicks)		63,000

=== Summer Cup ===
Round	Date	Opponent	H/A	Score	Hibernian Scorer(s)	Attendance
R1 L1	3 June	Airdrieonians	A	4–2		
R1 L2	10 June	Airdrieonians	H	3–0		
R2 L1	17 June	Morton	A	1–1		
R2 L2	16 June	Morton	H	0–2		

== See also ==
- List of Hibernian F.C. seasons
