= 1887–88 Hibernian F.C. season =

Hibernian
1887–88 season
- Scottish Cup: R3

Season 1887–88 was the 12th season in which Hibernian competed at a Scottish national level, entering the Scottish Cup for the 11th time.

== Overview ==
Hibs reached the third round of the Scottish Cup, losing 6–2 to the Heart of Midlothian.

== Results ==
All results are written with Hibs' score first.

=== Scottish Cup ===
Date	Round	Opponent	Venue	Result	Attendance	Scorers
3 September 1887	R1	Broxburn Thistle	H	5–0		
24 September 1887	R2	Erin Rovers	A	6–0	1,000	
15 October 1887	R3	Heart of Midlothian	A	1–1	6,000	
22 October 1887	R3 R	Heart of Midlothian	H	1–3	8,500	

== See also ==
- List of Hibernian F.C. seasons
