= 1915–16 Hibernian F.C. season =

Hibernian
1915–16 season
- Manager: Dan McMichael
- Scottish First Division: 16th
- Average home league attendance: 13,721 (down 618)

During the 1915–16 season Hibernian, a football club based in Edinburgh, finished nineteenth out of 20 clubs in the Scottish First Division.

== Scottish First Division ==
Match Day	Date	Opponent	H/A	Score	Hibernian Scorer(s)	Attendance
1	21 August	Queen's Park	H	3–0		4,000
2	28 August	Ayr United	A	3–2		4,000
3	4 September	Clyde	H	0–1		6,000
4	11 September	Falkirk	A	1–1		5,000
5	18 September	Morton	H	0–2		3,000
6	20 September	Heart of Midlothian	H	1–2		10,000
7	25 September	Raith Rovers	A	1–1		1,500
8	2 October	Celtic	H	0–4		12,000
9	9 October	Kilmarnock	A	0–0		3,000
10	16 October	Partick Thistle	H	0–4		3,000
11	23 October	Aberdeen	A	1–1		4,500
12	30 October	Dumbarton	H	1–1		3,000
13	6 November	Motherwell	H	1–2		4,000
14	13 November	Third Lanark	A	0–3		3,000
15	20 November	St Mirren	H	2–1		2,000
16	27 November	Rangers	A	2–4		7,000
17	4 December	Hamilton Academical	A	2–3		4,000
18	11 December	Third Lanark	H	0–1		2,000
19	18 December	Airdrieonians	A	0–1		2,500
20	25 December	Dundee	H	0–2		3,000
21	3 January	Queen's Park	A	2–4		4,000
22	8 January	Raith Rovers	H	1–0		4,000
23	15 January	Celtic	A	1–3		6,000
24	22 January	Airdrieonians	H	3–0		3,000
25	29 January	Morton	A	1–5		6,000
26	5 February	Falkirk	H	2–1		5,000
27	12 February	Dundee	A	1–2		6,000
28	19 February	Clyde	A	1–2		3,000
29	26 February	Kilmarnock	H	1–0		3,000
30	4 March	Motherwell	A	1–1		4,500
31	11 March	Rangers	H	2–3		8,000
32	18 March	Partick Thistle	A	1–4		8,000
33	1 April	St Mirren	A	1–3		4,000
34	8 April	Dumbarton	A	1–2		3,000
35	15 April	Aberdeen	H	0–0		3,000
36	17 April	Heart of Midlothian	A	3–1		5,000
37	22 April	Ayr United	H	3–1		4,000
38	26 April	Hamilton Academical	H	1–3		2,000

=== Final League table ===
P	Team	Pld	W	D	L	GF	GA	GD	Pts
18	Queen's Park	38	11	6	21	53	100	–47	28
19	Hibernian	38	9	7	22	44	71	–27	25
20	Raith Rovers	38	9	5	24	30	65	–35	23

== See also ==
- List of Hibernian F.C. seasons
