= 1881–82 Hibernian F.C. season =

Hibernian
1881–82 season
- Scottish Cup: R5

Season 1881–82 was the fifth in which Hibernian competed at a Scottish national level, entering the Scottish Cup for the fifth time.

== Overview ==
Hibs reached the fifth round of the Scottish Cup, losing 6–2 to Dumbarton.

== Results ==
All results are written with Hibs' score first.

=== Scottish Cup ===
Date	Round	Opponent	Venue	Result	Attendance	Scorers
27 August 1881	R2	Addiewell	H	7–0	5500	
8 October 1881	R2	St Bernard's	H	2–1	5000	Rourke (2)
19 November 1881	R4	West Benhar	A	4–4		
26 November 1881	R4R	West Benhar	H	8–0		
3 December 1881	R5	Dumbarton	H	2–6	4000	Rourke, Byrne
24 December 1881	R5	Dumbarton	H	2–6	4000	Rourke, Byrne

== See also ==
- List of Hibernian F.C. seasons
