= 1964–65 Hibernian F.C. season =

Hibernian
1964–65 season
- Manager: Jock Stein (to 9 March); Bob Shankly (from March)
- Scottish First Division: 4th
- Scottish Cup: SF
- Scottish League Cup: GS
- Summer Cup 1964: Winners
- Summer Cup 1965: SF
- Highest home attendance: 47,363 (v Rangers, 6 February)
- Lowest home attendance: 5093 (v Airdrieonians, 17 April)
- Average home league attendance: 13,860 (up 2146)

During the 1964–65 season Hibernian, a football club based in Edinburgh, came fourth out of 18 clubs in the Scottish First Division.

== Scottish First Division ==
Match Day	Date	Opponent	H/A	Score	Hibernian Scorer(s)	Attendance
1	19 August	Clyde	A	3–1		2,374
2	5 September	Heart of Midlothian	H	3–5		17,098
3	12 September	Falkirk	A	1–0		5,120
4	19 September	Aberdeen	H	4–2		8,846
5	26 September	Dundee United	A	1–0		7,959
6	3 October	Kilmarnock	H	1–2		15,471
7	10 October	Rangers	A	4–2		36,607
8	17 October	St Johnstone	A	3–1		6,844
9	24 October	Morton	H	2–1		5,874
10	31 October	Motherwell	A	2–0		8,320
11	7 November	St Mirren	H	1–1		10,859
12	14 November	Third Lanark	H	5–0		7,370
13	21 November	Dunfermline Athletic	A	0–1		10,625
14	28 November	Dundee	H	2–2		11,622
14	12 December	Airdrieonians	A	1–0		4,559
15	19 December	Partick Thistle	H	2–1		7,673
17	26 December	Clyde	H	4–3		7,606
18	1 January	Heart of Midlothian	A	1–0		36,297
19	2 January	Falkirk	H	6–0		13,408
20	9 January	Aberdeen	A	1–1		6,868
21	16 January	Dundee United	H	3–4		12,107
22	30 January	Rangers	H	1–0		43,499
23	13 February	St Johnstone	H	2–0		10,540
24	16 February	Kilmarnock	A	3–4		10,535
25	27 February	Morton	A	2–3		9,707
26	10 March	Motherwell	H	2–0		12,857
27	13 March	St Mirren	A	0–0		4,097
28	20 March	Third Lanark	A	2–0		1,134
29	22 March	Celtic	A	4–2		18,103
30	31 March	Dunfermline Athletic	H	1–0		18,804
31	3 April	Dundee	A	1–2		15,113
32	7 April	Celtic	H	0–4		15,893
33	17 April	Airdrieonians	H	5–1		5,093
34	23 April	Partick Thistle	A	2–4		1,989

=== Final League table ===
P	Team	Pld	W	D	L	GF	GA	GD	Pts
3	Dunfermline Athletic	34	22	5	7	83	36	47	49
4	Hibernian	34	21	4	9	75	47	28	46
5	Rangers	34	18	8	8	78	35	43	44

=== Scottish League Cup ===
==== Group stage ====
Round	Date	Opponent	H/A	Score	Hibernian Scorer(s)	Attendance
G2	8 August	Third Lanark	H	3–0		8,935
G2	12 August	Dunfermline Athletic	A	0–2		8,943
G2	15 August	Airdrieonians	H	5–0		7,798
G2	22 August	Third Lanark	A	2–0		2,648
G2	26 August	Dunfermline Athletic	H	1–1		16,839
G2	29 August	Airdrieonians	A	4–1		2,040

==== Group 2 final table ====
P	Team	Pld	W	D	L	GF	GA	GD	Pts
1	Dunfermline Athletic	6	5	1	0	14	3	11	11
2	Hibernian	6	4	1	1	15	4	11	9
3	Third Lanark	6	2	0	4	8	12	–4	4
4	Airdrieonians	6	0	0	6	5	23	–18	0

=== Scottish Cup ===
Round	Date	Opponent	H/A	Score	Hibernian Scorer(s)	Attendance
R1	6 February	E.S. Clydebank	H	1–1		11,500
R1 R	10 February	E.S. Clydebank	A	2–0		14,900
R2	20 February	Partick Thistle	H	5–1		16,551
QF	6 March	Rangers	H	2–1		47,363
SF	27 March	Dunfermline Athletic	N	0–2		33,305

=== 1964 Summer Cup ===
Continued from May

Round	Date	Opponent	H/A	Score	Hibernian Scorer(s)	Attendance
F L1	1 August	Aberdeen	A	2–3		10,100
F L2	5 August	Aberdeen	H	2–1		28,000
F R	2 September	Aberdeen	A	3–1		?????

=== 1965 Summer Cup ===
Round	Date	Opponent	H/A	Score	Hibernian Scorer(s)	Attendance
G4	1 May	Heart of Midlothian	H	3–0		?????
G4	5 May	Dunfermline Athletic	A	2–1		?????
G4	8 May	Falkirk	H	3–2		?????
G4	12 May	Heart of Midlothian	A	2–2		?????
G4	15 May	Dunfermline Athletic	H	1–2		?????
G4	19 May	Falkirk	A	3–1		?????

==== Section 4 Final Table ====
P	Team	Pld	W	D	L	GF	GA	GD	Pts
1	Hibernian	6	4	1	1	14	8	6	9
2	Heart of Midlothian	6	3	2	1	10	9	1	8
3	Dunfermline Athletic	6	2	2	2	7	7	0	6
4	Falkirk	6	0	1	5	4	11	–7	1

==== Knockout stage ====
Round	Date	Opponent	H/A	Score	Hibernian Scorer(s)	Attendance
SF L1	22 May	Motherwell	H	2–0		?????
SF L2	26 May	Motherwell	A	2–6		????

== See also ==
- List of Hibernian F.C. seasons
