= 1900–01 Hibernian F.C. season =

Hibernian
1900–01 season
- Manager: Dan McMichael
- Scottish First Division: 3rd
- Scottish Cup: Winners
- Average home league attendance: 13,721 (down 618)

During the 1900–01 season Hibernian, a football club based in Edinburgh, finished third out of 11 clubs in the Scottish First Division.

== Scottish First Division ==
Match Day	Date	Opponent	H/A	Score	Hibernian Scorer(s)	Attendance
1	25 August	Celtic	A	1–3		12,000
2	1 September	Heart of Midlothian	H	3–0		10,500
3	8 September	Kilmarnock	A	2–2		4,000
4	15 September	St Mirren	H	1–0		4,000
5	17 September	Rangers	H	4–1		9,000
6	22 September	Third Lanark	A	0–0		3,500
7	24 September	Partick Thistle	A	1–0		4,000
8	29 September	Celtic	H	2–2		12,500
9	13 October	Heart of Midlothian	A	0–0		6,500
10	20 October	Queen's Park	H	0–1		5,000
11	27 October	Dundee	H	2–1		4,500
12	17 November	St Mirren	A	2–0		3,500
13	24 November	Kilmarnock	H	2–2		3,000
14	1 December	Dundee	A	3–1		5,000
15	15 December	Third Lanark	H	2–0		1,600
16	22 December	Morton	H	1–1		2,000
17	19 January	Partick Thistle	H	2–0		2,000
18	26 January	Rangers	A	0–6		
19	30 March	Morton	H	0–1		4,000
18	27 April	Queen's Park	A	1–1		

=== Final League table ===
P	Team	Pld	W	D	L	GF	GA	GD	Pts
2	Celtic	20	13	3	4	49	28	21	29
3	Hibernian	20	9	7	4	29	22	7	25
4	Morton	20	9	3	8	40	40	0	21

=== Scottish Cup ===
Round	Date	Opponent	H/A	Score	Hibernian Scorer(s)	Attendance
R1	12 January	Dumbarton	H	7–0		1,500
R2	16 February	Royal Albert	A	1–1		3,000
R2 R	23 February	Royal Albert	H	1–0		4,000
R3	2 March	Morton	H	2–0		4,000
SF	9 March	Heart of Midlothian	A	1–1		19,500
SF R	23 March	Heart of Midlothian	H	1–2		18,000

== See also ==
- List of Hibernian F.C. seasons
