= 1880–81 Hibernian F.C. season =

Hibernian
1880–81 season
- Scottish Cup: R3

Season 1880–81 was the fourth in which Hibernian competed at a Scottish national level, entering the Scottish Cup for the fourth time.

== Overview ==
Hibs reached the third round of the Scottish Cup, losing 5–3 to Edinburgh derby rivals Hearts. The match was played in the Powderhall area of Edinburgh.

== Results ==
All results are written with Hibs' score first.

=== Scottish Cup ===
Date	Round	Opponent	Venue	Result	Attendance	Scorers
9 October 1880	R2	Dunfermline	H	3–1		
23 October 1880	R3	Hearts	A	3–5	5000	

== See also ==
- List of Hibernian F.C. seasons
