= 1886–87 Hibernian F.C. season =

Hibernian
1886–87 season
- Scottish Cup: Winners

Season 1886–87 was the 11th season in which Hibernian competed at a Scottish national level, entering the Scottish Cup for the 10th time.

== Overview ==
Hibs reached the final of the Scottish Cup, winning 3–1 to the Dumbarton at Hampden Park.

== Results ==
All results are written with Hibs' score first.

=== Scottish Cup ===
Date	Round	Opponent	Venue	Result	Attendance	Scorers
11 September 1886	R1	Durhamstown Rangers	H	5–1		
2 October 1886	R2	Mossend Swifts	A	1–1		
9 October 1886	R2 R	Mossend Swifts	H	1–1	2,500	
23 October 1886	R3	Heart of Midlothian	H	5–1	7,000	
6 November 1886	R4	bye into Round 5				
4 December 1886	R5	Queen of the South Wanderers	H	7–3		
25 December 1886	R6	Third Lanarkshire Rifle Volunteers	A	2–1	5,000	
22 January 1887	SF	Vale of Leven	H	3–1	6,000	
12 February 1887	F	Dumbarton	A	3–1	15,000	

== See also ==
- List of Hibernian F.C. seasons
