= 1899–1900 Hibernian F.C. season =

Hibernian
1899–1900 season
- Manager: Dan McMichael
- Scottish First Division: 3rd
- Scottish Cup: 2nd Round
- Average home league attendance: 13,721 (down 618)

During the 1899–1900 season Hibernian, a football club based in Edinburgh, finished third out of 10 clubs in the Scottish First Division.

== Scottish First Division ==
Match Day	Date	Opponent	H/A	Score	Hibernian Scorer(s)	Attendance
1	2 September	Kilmarnock	H	3–1		12,000
2	9 September	Celtic	A	1–2		15,000
3	16 September	Dundee	A	2–2		6,000
4	18 September	Celtic	H	1–1		12,000
5	23 September	St Mirren	H	5–1		2,500
6	25 September	Rangers	A	2–3		12,000
7	7 October	St Mirren	A	1–1		3,000
8	14 October	Kilmarnock	A	3–0		12,500
9	21 October	Rangers	H	0–2		17,000
10	28 October	Heart of Midlothian	H	1–0		9,000
11	4 November	Clyde	A	4–3		4,000
12	11 November	St Bernard's	A	4–0		1,000
13	18 November	Dundee	H	3–3		3,000
14	25 November	Heart of Midlothian	A	3–1		7,500
15	2 December	Third Lanark	A	1–1		4,000
16	16 December	Third Lanark	H	3–2		700
17	23 December	Clyde	H	5–0		700
18	6 January	St Bernard's	H	1–1		2,000

=== Final League table ===
P	Team	Pld	W	D	L	GF	GA	GD	Pts
2	Celtic	18	9	7	2	46	27	19	25
3	Hibernian	18	9	6	3	43	24	19	24
4	Heart of Midlothian	18	10	3	5	41	24	17	23

=== Scottish Cup ===
Round	Date	Opponent	H/A	Score	Hibernian Scorer(s)	Attendance
R1	13 January	Hamilton Academical	A	3–2		2,500
R2	27 January	Heart of Midlothian	A	1–1		14,000
R2 R	3 February	Heart of Midlothian	H	1–2		12,000

== See also ==
- List of Hibernian F.C. seasons
