= 1926–27 Hibernian F.C. season =

Hibernian
1926–27 season
- Manager: Bobby Templeton
- Scottish First Division: 9th
- Scottish Cup: R1
- Average home league attendance: 12,800 (down 75)

During the 1926–27 season Hibernian, a football club based in Edinburgh, finished ninth out of 20 clubs in the Scottish First Division.

== Scottish First Division ==
| Match Day | Date | Opponent | H/A | Score | Hibernian Scorer(s) | Attendance |
|---|---|---|---|---|---|---|
| 1 | 14 August | St Johnstone | H | 1–5 | | 18,000 |
| 2 | 21 August | Dundee United | A | 2–0 | | 9,000 |
| 3 | 28 August | Aberdeen | H | 2–3 | | 16,000 |
| 4 | 4 September | Airdrieonians | A | 0–3 | | 6,000 |
| 5 | 11 September | St Mirren | H | 2–1 | | 12,000 |
| 6 | 18 September | Dunfermline Athletic | A | 2–4 | | 7,000 |
| 7 | 25 September | Celtic | H | 3–2 | | 20,000 |
| 8 | 2 October | Partick Thistle | A | 1–5 | | 8,000 |
| 9 | 9 October | Motherwell | H | 1–1 | | 10,000 |
| 10 | 16 October | Hamilton Academical | A | 1–0 | | 3,000 |
| 11 | 23 October | Clyde | H | 3–0 | | 10,000 |
| 12 | 30 October | Heart of Midlothian | H | 2–2 | | 25,500 |
| 13 | 6 November | Dundee | A | 0–3 | | 7,000 |
| 14 | 13 November | Rangers | H | 2–2 | | 18,000 |
| 15 | 20 November | Queen's Park | H | 2–0 | | 10,000 |
| 16 | 27 November | Falkirk | A | 0–2 | | 6,000 |
| 17 | 4 December | Kilmarnock | H | 5–1 | | 8,000 |
| 18 | 11 December | Morton | A | 0–3 | | 3,000 |
| 19 | 18 December | Cowdenbeath | H | 2–0 | | 12,000 |
| 20 | 25 December | St Johnstone | A | 0–0 | | 5,000 |
| 21 | 1 January | Heart of Midlothian | H | 1–1 | | 27,000 |
| 22 | 3 January | Aberdeen | A | 5–2 | | 12,000 |
| 23 | 8 January | Airdrieonians | H | 2–1 | | 9,000 |
| 24 | 15 January | St Mirren | A | 1–3 | | 8,000 |
| 25 | 29 January | Dunfermline Athletic | H | 2–2 | | 4,000 |
| 26 | 2 February | Celtic | A | 3–2 | | 15,000 |
| 27 | 12 February | Partick Thistle | H | 3–2 | | 12,000 |
| 28 | 19 February | Motherwell | A | 1–2 | | 10,000 |
| 29 | 26 February | Hamilton Academical | H | 3–1 | | 8,000 |
| 30 | 5 March | Clyde | A | 0–2 | | 3,000 |
| 31 | 12 March | Dundee United | H | 3–2 | | 12,000 |
| 32 | 19 March | Dundee | H | 0–1 | | 8,000 |
| 33 | 29 March | Rangers | A | 0–2 | | 5,000 |
| 34 | 5 April | Queen's Park | A | 4–3 | | 3,000 |
| 35 | 9 April | Falkirk | H | 1–0 | | 10,000 |
| 36 | 20 April | Kilmarnock | A | 0–4 | | 2,000 |
| 37 | 23 April | Morton | H | 1–1 | | 6,500 |
| 38 | 30 April | Cowdenbeath | A | 0–2 | | 2,000 |

=== Final League table ===
| P | Team | Pld | W | D | L | GF | GA | GD | Pts |
|---|---|---|---|---|---|---|---|---|---|
| 8 | Aberdeen | 38 | 13 | 14 | 11 | 73 | 72 | 1 | 40 |
| 9 | Hibernian | 38 | 16 | 7 | 15 | 62 | 71 | –9 | 39 |
| 10 | St Mirren | 38 | 16 | 5 | 17 | 78 | 76 | 2 | 37 |

=== Scottish Cup ===
| Round | Date | Opponent | H/A | Score | Hibernian Scorer(s) | Attendance |
|---|---|---|---|---|---|---|
| R1 | 22 January | Cowdenbeath | A | 0–3 | | 14,000 |

== See also ==
- List of Hibernian F.C. seasons
