= 1946–47 Hibernian F.C. season =

Hibernian
1946–47 season
- Manager: Willie McCartney
- Scottish First Division: 2nd
- Scottish Cup: F
- Scottish League Cup: SF
- Highest home attendance: 41,378 (v Rangers, 14 December)
- Lowest home attendance: 15,000 (v St Mirren, 26 April)
- Average home league attendance: 24,225 (up 11,225 from season 1938-39)

During the 1946–47 season Hibernian, a football club based in Edinburgh, came second out of 16 clubs in the Scottish First Division.

== Scottish First Division ==
Match Day	Date	Opponent	H/A	Score	Hibernian Scorer(s)	Attendance
1	10 August	Queen of the South	H	9–1		30,000
2	14 August	Rangers	A	2–1		50,000
3	17 August	Queen's Park	A	1–0		47,752
4	21 August	Clyde	H	1–0		25,000
5	24 August	Hamilton Academical	H	3–2		20,000
6	28 August	Aberdeen	A	1–2		29,000
7	31 August	Motherwell	A	1–2		10,000
8	4 September	Kilmarnock	H	6–0		20,000
9	7 September	Heart of Midlothian	H	0–1		39,000
10	14 September	Morton	A	2–0		10,000
11	2 November	Third Lanark	H	4–1		20,000
12	9 November	Celtic	A	1–4		45,000
13	16 November	Falkirk	H	2–2		15,000
14	23 November	Partick Thistle	H	5–1		20,000
14	30 November	St Mirren	A	1–0		14,000
15	7 December	Queen of the South	A	3–1		10,000
17	14 December	Rangers	H	1–1		41,378
18	21 December	Clyde	A	2–2		15,000
19	28 December	Aberdeen	H	1–1		30,000
20	1 January	Heart of Midlothian	A	3–2		33,810
21	2 January	Queen's Park	H	3–1		20,000
22	4 January	Morton	H	1–1		18,000
23	11 January	Hamilton Academical	A	0–0		5,000
24	18 January	Kilmarnock	A	5–3		15,000
25	1 February	Motherwell	H	1–2		25,000
26	12 April	Celtic	H	2–0		25,000
27	26 April	St Mirren	H	1–0		15,000
28	3 May	Partick Thistle	A	2–0		5,000
29	10 May	Third Lanark	A	2–0		5,487
30	17 May	Falkirk	A	3–2		7,000

=== Final League table ===
P	Team	Pld	W	D	L	GF	GA	GD	Pts
1	Rangers	30	21	4	5	76	26	50	46
2	Hibernian	30	19	6	5	69	33	36	44
3	Aberdeen	30	16	7	7	58	41	17	39

=== Scottish League Cup ===
==== Group stage ====
Round	Date	Opponent	H/A	Score	Hibernian Scorer(s)	Attendance
G3	21 September	Celtic	H	4–2		20,000
G3	28 September	Hamilton Academical	A	6–3		1,000
G3	5 October	Third Lanark	H	1–2		25,000
G3	12 October	Celtic	A	1–1		40,000
G3	19 October	Hamilton Academical	H	2–0		15,000
G3	26 October	Third Lanark	A	2–1		17,811

==== Group 3 final table ====
P	Team	Pld	W	D	L	GF	GA	GD	Pts
1	Hibernian	6	4	1	1	16	9	7	9
2	Celtic	6	2	3	1	11	10	1	7
3	Hamilton Academical	6	2	1	3	14	16	–2	5
4	Third Lanark	6	1	1	4	8	14	–6	3

==== Knockout stage ====
Round	Date	Opponent	H/A	Score	Hibernian Scorer(s)	Attendance
QF L1	1 March	Airdrieonians	H	4–4		18,000
QF L2	5 March	Airdrieonians	A	1–0		22,260
SF	22 March	Rangers	N	1–3		123,654

=== Scottish Cup ===
Round	Date	Opponent	H/A	Score	Hibernian Scorer(s)	Attendance
R1	25 January	Alloa Athletic	H	8–0		11,000
R2	15 February	Bye into Round 3				
R3	22 February	Rangers	A	0–0		95,000
R3 R	8 March	Rangers	H	2–0		48,816
R4	15 March	Dumbarton	H	2–0		32,579
SF	29 March	Motherwell	N	2–1		46,705
F	19 April	Aberdeen	N	1–2		80,640

== See also ==
- List of Hibernian F.C. seasons
