= 1941–42 Hibernian F.C. season =

Hibernian
1941–42 season
- Manager: Willie McCartney
- Southern League: 2nd
- Summer Cup: F
- Southern League Cup: GS
- Average home league attendance: No Attendances Available (league suspended)
Home colours

During the 1941–42 season Hibernian, a football club based in Edinburgh, came second out of 16 clubs in the Southern Football League.

== Southern League ==
Match Day	Date	Opponent	H/A	Score	Hibernian Scorer(s)	Attendance
1	9 August	Morton	A	1–2		
2	16 August	Clyde	H	1–4		
3	23 August	Albion Rovers	A	8–3		
4	30 August	Hamilton Academical	H	4–0		
5	6 September	Heart of Midlothian	A	4–2		20,000
6	13 September	Dumbarton	H	4–0		
7	20 September	Queen's Park	A	2–1		
8	27 September	Rangers	H	8–1		
9	4 October	Third Lanark	A	2–4		
10	11 October	Celtic	H	1–3		
11	18 October	Motherwell	A	2–3		
12	25 October	Falkirk	A	2–1		
13	1 November	Airdrieonians	H	4–1		
14	8 November	Partick Thistle	A	2–3		
14	15 November	St Mirren	H	5–2		
15	22 November	Morton	H	1–0		
17	29 November	Clyde	A	3–2		
18	6 December	Albion Rovers	H	5–2		
19	13 December	Hamilton Academical	A	2–2		
20	20 December	Queen's Park	H	1–1		
21	27 December	Rangers	A	1–0		
22	1 January	Heart of Midlothian	H	2–2		21,525
23	3 January	Dumbarton	A	1–2		
24	10 January	Third Lanark	H	6–0		
25	17 January	Celtic	A	1–2		
26	31 January	Falkirk	H	2–0		
27	14 February	Partick Thistle	H	4–0		
28	21 February	St Mirren	A	1–1		
29	2 May	Motherwell	H	3–1		
30	9 May	Airdrieonians	A	2–1		

=== Final League table ===
P	Team	Pld	W	D	L	GF	GA	GD	Pts
1	Rangers	30	22	4	4	97	35	62	48
2	Hibernian	30	18	4	8	85	46	39	40
3	Celtic	30	15	9	6	69	50	19	39

=== Southern League Cup ===
==== Group stage ====
Round	Date	Opponent	H/A	Score	Hibernian Scorer(s)	Attendance
GB	28 February	Hamilton Academical	H	1–2		
GB	7 March	St Mirren	A	1–4		
GB	14 March	Queen's Park	H	3–1		
GB	21 March	Hamilton Academical	A	1–3		
GB	28 March	Celtic	H	1–0		
GB	4 April	Queen's Park	A	0–1		

==== Group B final table ====
P	Team	Pld	W	D	L	GF	GA	GD	Pts
1	Celtic	6	5	0	1	15	7	8	10
2	Hibernian	6	3	0	3	9	10	–1	6
3	Hamilton Academical	6	2	1	3	8	8	0	5
4	Queen's Park	6	1	1	4	7	14	–7	3

=== Summer Cup ===
Round	Date	Opponent	H/A	Score	Hibernian Scorer(s)	Attendance
R1 L1	30 May	Clyde	H	2–1		
R1 L2	6 June	Clyde	A	2–0		
R2 L1	13 June	Third Lanark	H	8–2		
R2 L2	20 June	Third Lanark	A	5–1		
SF	27 June	Motherwell	N	3–1		20,000
SF	4 July	Rangers	N	2–2 (Rangers win on penalties)		

== See also ==
- List of Hibernian F.C. seasons
