= 1883–84 Hibernian F.C. season =

Hibernian
1883–84 season
- Scottish Cup: Semi-finalists

Season 1883–84 was the 8th season in which Hibernian competed at a Scottish national level, entering the Scottish Cup for the 7th time.

== Overview ==
Hibs reached the semi-final of the Scottish Cup, losing 5–1 to the Queen's Park.

== Results ==
All results are written with Hibs' score first.

=== Scottish Cup ===
Date	Round	Opponent	Venue	Result	Attendance	Scorers
8 September 1883	R1	West Calder	H	5–0		
6 October 1883	R2	Edina	H	10–1		
20 October 1883	R3	Heart of Midlothian	A	4–1	6,000	
10 November 1883	R4	5th KRV (Dumfries)	H	8–1		
1 December 1883	R5	bye				
22 December 1883	R6	Battlefield	H	6–1	1,200	
2 February 1884	SF	Queen's Park	H	1–5	8,500	

== See also ==
- List of Hibernian F.C. seasons
