= List of Hibernian F.C. seasons =

This is a list of seasons played by Hibernian F.C. in Scottish and European football since the club first entered the Scottish Cup in 1877. The club was founded by Irish immigrants in 1875 and was admitted into the Scottish Football League in 1893. Hibernian has won the league championship four times, the Scottish Cup three times and the Scottish League Cup three times.

The list details the club's achievements in all major competitions, and the top league goalscorer(s) for each season. For some seasons before 1900, the goalscoring information is incomplete but the player mentioned is almost certainly correct. Top scorers in bold were also the top scorers in Hibernian's division that season. Records of local competitions, such as the East of Scotland Shield, are not included.

== Seasons ==
Season	League									Scottish Cup	League Cup	Challenge Cup	Europe		Top league goalscorer(s)	
Season	Division	Pld	W	D	L	GF	GA	Pts	Pos	Scottish Cup	League Cup	Challenge Cup	Europe		Player(s)	Goals
1877–78	(Note: The Scottish Football League was not formed until 1890; Hibs were not admitted to the league until the 1893–94 season.)									R5	(Note: The League Cup competition did not start until the 1946–47 season.)	(Note: The Challenge Cup competition did not start until the 1990–91 season.)	(Note: European club competitions did not begin until the 1955–56 season.)			
1878–79	(Note: The Scottish Football League was not formed until 1890; Hibs were not admitted to the league until the 1893–94 season.)									R5	(Note: The League Cup competition did not start until the 1946–47 season.)	(Note: The Challenge Cup competition did not start until the 1990–91 season.)	(Note: European club competitions did not begin until the 1955–56 season.)			
1879–80	(Note: The Scottish Football League was not formed until 1890; Hibs were not admitted to the league until the 1893–94 season.)									R6	(Note: The League Cup competition did not start until the 1946–47 season.)	(Note: The Challenge Cup competition did not start until the 1990–91 season.)	(Note: European club competitions did not begin until the 1955–56 season.)			
1880–81	(Note: The Scottish Football League was not formed until 1890; Hibs were not admitted to the league until the 1893–94 season.)									R3	(Note: The League Cup competition did not start until the 1946–47 season.)	(Note: The Challenge Cup competition did not start until the 1990–91 season.)	(Note: European club competitions did not begin until the 1955–56 season.)			
1881–82	(Note: The Scottish Football League was not formed until 1890; Hibs were not admitted to the league until the 1893–94 season.)									R5	(Note: The League Cup competition did not start until the 1946–47 season.)	(Note: The Challenge Cup competition did not start until the 1990–91 season.)	(Note: European club competitions did not begin until the 1955–56 season.)			
1882–83	(Note: The Scottish Football League was not formed until 1890; Hibs were not admitted to the league until the 1893–94 season.)									R5	(Note: The League Cup competition did not start until the 1946–47 season.)	(Note: The Challenge Cup competition did not start until the 1990–91 season.)	(Note: European club competitions did not begin until the 1955–56 season.)			
1883–84	(Note: The Scottish Football League was not formed until 1890; Hibs were not admitted to the league until the 1893–94 season.)									Semi	(Note: The League Cup competition did not start until the 1946–47 season.)	(Note: The Challenge Cup competition did not start until the 1990–91 season.)	(Note: European club competitions did not begin until the 1955–56 season.)			
1884–85	(Note: The Scottish Football League was not formed until 1890; Hibs were not admitted to the league until the 1893–94 season.)									Semi	(Note: The League Cup competition did not start until the 1946–47 season.)	(Note: The Challenge Cup competition did not start until the 1990–91 season.)	(Note: European club competitions did not begin until the 1955–56 season.)			
1885–86	(Note: The Scottish Football League was not formed until 1890; Hibs were not admitted to the league until the 1893–94 season.)									Semi	(Note: The League Cup competition did not start until the 1946–47 season.)	(Note: The Challenge Cup competition did not start until the 1990–91 season.)	(Note: European club competitions did not begin until the 1955–56 season.)			
1886–87	(Note: The Scottish Football League was not formed until 1890; Hibs were not admitted to the league until the 1893–94 season.)									**Winners**	(Note: The League Cup competition did not start until the 1946–47 season.)	(Note: The Challenge Cup competition did not start until the 1990–91 season.)	(Note: European club competitions did not begin until the 1955–56 season.)			
1887–88	(Note: The Scottish Football League was not formed until 1890; Hibs were not admitted to the league until the 1893–94 season.)									R3	(Note: The League Cup competition did not start until the 1946–47 season.)	(Note: The Challenge Cup competition did not start until the 1990–91 season.)	(Note: European club competitions did not begin until the 1955–56 season.)			
1888–89	(Note: The Scottish Football League was not formed until 1890; Hibs were not admitted to the league until the 1893–94 season.)									R1	(Note: The League Cup competition did not start until the 1946–47 season.)	(Note: The Challenge Cup competition did not start until the 1990–91 season.)	(Note: European club competitions did not begin until the 1955–56 season.)			
1889–90	(Note: The Scottish Football League was not formed until 1890; Hibs were not admitted to the league until the 1893–94 season.)									R6	(Note: The League Cup competition did not start until the 1946–47 season.)	(Note: The Challenge Cup competition did not start until the 1990–91 season.)	(Note: European club competitions did not begin until the 1955–56 season.)			
1890–91	(Note: The Scottish Football League was not formed until 1890; Hibs were not admitted to the league until the 1893–94 season.)									R2	(Note: The League Cup competition did not start until the 1946–47 season.)	(Note: The Challenge Cup competition did not start until the 1990–91 season.)	(Note: European club competitions did not begin until the 1955–56 season.)			
1891–92	(Note: The Scottish Football League was not formed until 1890; Hibs were not admitted to the league until the 1893–94 season.)									DNE (Note: Hibs suspended operations during the 1891–92 season and did not enter the Scottish Cup in either 1891–92 or 1892–93.)	(Note: The League Cup competition did not start until the 1946–47 season.)	(Note: The Challenge Cup competition did not start until the 1990–91 season.)	(Note: European club competitions did not begin until the 1955–56 season.)			
1892–93	(Note: The Scottish Football League was not formed until 1890; Hibs were not admitted to the league until the 1893–94 season.)									DNE	(Note: The League Cup competition did not start until the 1946–47 season.)	(Note: The Challenge Cup competition did not start until the 1990–91 season.)	(Note: European club competitions did not begin until the 1955–56 season.)			
1893–94	**2**	18	13	3	2	83	29	29	**1st** (Note: Hibs were not promoted to Division One for the following season. At the time promotion and relegation were decided by election, rather than automatic selection.)	DNQ (Note: Due to not participating in the Scottish Football League in the previous season, Hibs were forced to play in the Scottish Qualifying Cup and were beaten by Vale of Leven, therefore did not qualify for the Scottish Cup.)	(Note: The League Cup competition did not start until the 1946–47 season.)	(Note: The Challenge Cup competition did not start until the 1990–91 season.)	(Note: European club competitions did not begin until the 1955–56 season.)		Martin	
1894–95	**2**	18	14	2	2	92	28	30	**1st**	R2	(Note: The League Cup competition did not start until the 1946–47 season.)	(Note: The Challenge Cup competition did not start until the 1990–91 season.)	(Note: European club competitions did not begin until the 1955–56 season.)		Martin	
1895–96	1	18	13	3	2	83	29	29	3rd	Final	(Note: The League Cup competition did not start until the 1946–47 season.)	(Note: The Challenge Cup competition did not start until the 1990–91 season.)	(Note: European club competitions did not begin until the 1955–56 season.)		Smith	
1896–97	1	18	12	2	4	50	20	26	2nd	R2	(Note: The League Cup competition did not start until the 1946–47 season.)	(Note: The Challenge Cup competition did not start until the 1990–91 season.)	(Note: European club competitions did not begin until the 1955–56 season.)		Pryce	10
1897–98	1	18	10	2	6	48	28	22	3rd	R3	(Note: The League Cup competition did not start until the 1946–47 season.)	(Note: The Challenge Cup competition did not start until the 1990–91 season.)	(Note: European club competitions did not begin until the 1955–56 season.)		Martin	
1898–99	1	18	10	3	5	42	43	23	4th	R2	(Note: The League Cup competition did not start until the 1946–47 season.)	(Note: The Challenge Cup competition did not start until the 1990–91 season.)	(Note: European club competitions did not begin until the 1955–56 season.)		Atherton	7
1899–1900	1	18	9	6	3	43	24	24	3rd	R2	(Note: The League Cup competition did not start until the 1946–47 season.)	(Note: The Challenge Cup competition did not start until the 1990–91 season.)	(Note: European club competitions did not begin until the 1955–56 season.)		McGuigan	
1900–01	1	20	9	7	4	29	22	25	3rd	Semi	(Note: The League Cup competition did not start until the 1946–47 season.)	(Note: The Challenge Cup competition did not start until the 1990–91 season.)	(Note: European club competitions did not begin until the 1955–56 season.)		Handling	7
1901–02	1	18	6	4	8	36	24	16	6th	**Winners**	(Note: The League Cup competition did not start until the 1946–47 season.)	(Note: The Challenge Cup competition did not start until the 1990–91 season.)	(Note: European club competitions did not begin until the 1955–56 season.)		McCartney	7
1902–03	**1**	22	16	5	1	48	18	37	**1st**	R3	(Note: The League Cup competition did not start until the 1946–47 season.)	(Note: The Challenge Cup competition did not start until the 1990–91 season.)	(Note: European club competitions did not begin until the 1955–56 season.)		**Reid**	**13**
1903–04	1	26	7	5	14	29	40	19	10th	R2	(Note: The League Cup competition did not start until the 1946–47 season.)	(Note: The Challenge Cup competition did not start until the 1990–91 season.)	(Note: European club competitions did not begin until the 1955–56 season.)		Stewart	7
1904–05	1	26	9	8	9	39	39	26	5th	R1	(Note: The League Cup competition did not start until the 1946–47 season.)	(Note: The Challenge Cup competition did not start until the 1990–91 season.)	(Note: European club competitions did not begin until the 1955–56 season.)		Callaghan	11
1905–06	1	30	10	5	15	35	40	25	11th	R3	(Note: The League Cup competition did not start until the 1946–47 season.)	(Note: The Challenge Cup competition did not start until the 1990–91 season.)	(Note: European club competitions did not begin until the 1955–56 season.)		Callaghan	8
1906–07	1	34	10	10	14	40	49	30	12th	Semi	(Note: The League Cup competition did not start until the 1946–47 season.)	(Note: The Challenge Cup competition did not start until the 1990–91 season.)	(Note: European club competitions did not begin until the 1955–56 season.)		Findlay	10
1907–08	1	34	17	8	9	55	42	42	5th	R3	(Note: The League Cup competition did not start until the 1946–47 season.)	(Note: The Challenge Cup competition did not start until the 1990–91 season.)	(Note: European club competitions did not begin until the 1955–56 season.)		Harker	20
1908–09	1	34	16	7	11	40	32	39	6th	R2	(Note: The League Cup competition did not start until the 1946–47 season.)	(Note: The Challenge Cup competition did not start until the 1990–91 season.)	(Note: European club competitions did not begin until the 1955–56 season.)		Peggie	11
1909–10	1	34	14	6	14	33	40	34	8th	Semi	(Note: The League Cup competition did not start until the 1946–47 season.)	(Note: The Challenge Cup competition did not start until the 1990–91 season.)	(Note: European club competitions did not begin until the 1955–56 season.)		Peggie Sharp Smith	5
1910–11	1	34	15	6	13	44	48	36	9th	R1	(Note: The League Cup competition did not start until the 1946–47 season.)	(Note: The Challenge Cup competition did not start until the 1990–91 season.)	(Note: European club competitions did not begin until the 1955–56 season.)		Paterson	17
1911–12	1	34	12	5	17	44	47	29	13th	R1	(Note: The League Cup competition did not start until the 1946–47 season.)	(Note: The Challenge Cup competition did not start until the 1990–91 season.)	(Note: European club competitions did not begin until the 1955–56 season.)		Anderson	8
1912–13	1	34	16	5	13	63	54	37	6th	R3	(Note: The League Cup competition did not start until the 1946–47 season.)	(Note: The Challenge Cup competition did not start until the 1990–91 season.)	(Note: European club competitions did not begin until the 1955–56 season.)		Hendren	18
1913–14	1	38	12	6	20	58	75	30	13th	Final	(Note: The League Cup competition did not start until the 1946–47 season.)	(Note: The Challenge Cup competition did not start until the 1990–91 season.)	(Note: European club competitions did not begin until the 1955–56 season.)		Hendren	18
1914–15	1	38	12	11	15	59	66	35	10th	(Note: The Scottish Cup was not held between 1915 and 1919 because of the Great War.)	(Note: The League Cup competition did not start until the 1946–47 season.)	(Note: The Challenge Cup competition did not start until the 1990–91 season.)	(Note: European club competitions did not begin until the 1955–56 season.)		Hendren	14
1915–16	SFL	38	9	7	22	44	71	25	19th	(Note: The Scottish Cup was not held between 1915 and 1919 because of the Great War.)	(Note: The League Cup competition did not start until the 1946–47 season.)	(Note: The Challenge Cup competition did not start until the 1990–91 season.)	(Note: European club competitions did not begin until the 1955–56 season.)		Fleming Hutchison	9
1916–17	SFL	38	10	10	18	57	72	30	17th	(Note: The Scottish Cup was not held between 1915 and 1919 because of the Great War.)	(Note: The League Cup competition did not start until the 1946–47 season.)	(Note: The Challenge Cup competition did not start until the 1990–91 season.)	(Note: European club competitions did not begin until the 1955–56 season.)		Kilpatrick	12
1917–18	SFL	34	8	9	17	42	57	25	16th	(Note: The Scottish Cup was not held between 1915 and 1919 because of the Great War.)	(Note: The League Cup competition did not start until the 1946–47 season.)	(Note: The Challenge Cup competition did not start until the 1990–91 season.)	(Note: European club competitions did not begin until the 1955–56 season.)		Miller	16
1918–19	SFL	34	5	3	26	30	91	16	18th	(Note: The Scottish Cup was not held between 1915 and 1919 because of the Great War.)	(Note: The League Cup competition did not start until the 1946–47 season.)	(Note: The Challenge Cup competition did not start until the 1990–91 season.)	(Note: European club competitions did not begin until the 1955–56 season.)		Gilmour	6
1919–20	SFL	42	13	7	22	60	79	33	18th	R2	(Note: The League Cup competition did not start until the 1946–47 season.)	(Note: The Challenge Cup competition did not start until the 1990–91 season.)	(Note: European club competitions did not begin until the 1955–56 season.)		Williamson	21
1920–21	SFL	42	16	9	17	58	57	41	13th	R2	(Note: The League Cup competition did not start until the 1946–47 season.)	(Note: The Challenge Cup competition did not start until the 1990–91 season.)	(Note: European club competitions did not begin until the 1955–56 season.)		Anderson	17
1921–22	1	42	16	14	12	55	44	44	7th	R2	(Note: The League Cup competition did not start until the 1946–47 season.)	(Note: The Challenge Cup competition did not start until the 1990–91 season.)	(Note: European club competitions did not begin until the 1955–56 season.)		Young	10
1922–23	1	42	17	7	14	45	40	41	8th	Final	(Note: The League Cup competition did not start until the 1946–47 season.)	(Note: The Challenge Cup competition did not start until the 1990–91 season.)	(Note: European club competitions did not begin until the 1955–56 season.)		McColl	12
1923–24	1	38	15	11	12	66	52	41	7th	Final	(Note: The League Cup competition did not start until the 1946–47 season.)	(Note: The Challenge Cup competition did not start until the 1990–91 season.)	(Note: European club competitions did not begin until the 1955–56 season.)		McColl	21
1924–25	1	38	22	8	8	78	43	52	3rd	R1	(Note: The League Cup competition did not start until the 1946–47 season.)	(Note: The Challenge Cup competition did not start until the 1990–91 season.)	(Note: European club competitions did not begin until the 1955–56 season.)		Dunn	24
1925–26	1	38	12	6	20	72	77	30	16th	R2	(Note: The League Cup competition did not start until the 1946–47 season.)	(Note: The Challenge Cup competition did not start until the 1990–91 season.)	(Note: European club competitions did not begin until the 1955–56 season.)		Dunn	17
1926–27	1	38	16	7	15	62	71	39	9th	R1	(Note: The League Cup competition did not start until the 1946–47 season.)	(Note: The Challenge Cup competition did not start until the 1990–91 season.)	(Note: European club competitions did not begin until the 1955–56 season.)		McColl	16
1927–28	1	38	13	9	16	73	75	35	12th	Semi	(Note: The League Cup competition did not start until the 1946–47 season.)	(Note: The Challenge Cup competition did not start until the 1990–91 season.)	(Note: European club competitions did not begin until the 1955–56 season.)		McColl	24
1928–29	1	38	13	6	19	54	62	32	14th	R1	(Note: The League Cup competition did not start until the 1946–47 season.)	(Note: The Challenge Cup competition did not start until the 1990–91 season.)	(Note: European club competitions did not begin until the 1955–56 season.)		Bradley	13
1929–30	1	38	9	11	18	45	62	29	17th	R3	(Note: The League Cup competition did not start until the 1946–47 season.)	(Note: The Challenge Cup competition did not start until the 1990–91 season.)	(Note: European club competitions did not begin until the 1955–56 season.)		Dobson	11
1930–31	1	38	9	7	22	49	81	25	19th	R3	(Note: The League Cup competition did not start until the 1946–47 season.)	(Note: The Challenge Cup competition did not start until the 1990–91 season.)	(Note: European club competitions did not begin until the 1955–56 season.)		Main	15
1931–32	2	38	18	8	12	73	52	44	7th	R1	(Note: The League Cup competition did not start until the 1946–47 season.)	(Note: The Challenge Cup competition did not start until the 1990–91 season.)	(Note: European club competitions did not begin until the 1955–56 season.)		Dobson	14
1932–33	**2**	37	28	4	5	99	33	60	**1st**	R4	(Note: The League Cup competition did not start until the 1946–47 season.)	(Note: The Challenge Cup competition did not start until the 1990–91 season.)	(Note: European club competitions did not begin until the 1955–56 season.)		R. Wallace	20
1933–34	1	38	12	3	23	51	69	27	16th	R3	(Note: The League Cup competition did not start until the 1946–47 season.)	(Note: The Challenge Cup competition did not start until the 1990–91 season.)	(Note: European club competitions did not begin until the 1955–56 season.)		Flucker	12
1934–35	1	38	14	8	16	59	70	36	11th	R3	(Note: The League Cup competition did not start until the 1946–47 season.)	(Note: The Challenge Cup competition did not start until the 1990–91 season.)	(Note: European club competitions did not begin until the 1955–56 season.)		Walls	11
1935–36	1	38	11	7	20	56	82	29	17th	R2	(Note: The League Cup competition did not start until the 1946–47 season.)	(Note: The Challenge Cup competition did not start until the 1990–91 season.)	(Note: European club competitions did not begin until the 1955–56 season.)		Brady	18
1936–37	1	38	6	13	19	54	83	25	17th	R2	(Note: The League Cup competition did not start until the 1946–47 season.)	(Note: The Challenge Cup competition did not start until the 1990–91 season.)	(Note: European club competitions did not begin until the 1955–56 season.)		Black	12
1937–38	1	38	11	13	14	57	65	35	10th	R1	(Note: The League Cup competition did not start until the 1946–47 season.)	(Note: The Challenge Cup competition did not start until the 1990–91 season.)	(Note: European club competitions did not begin until the 1955–56 season.)		Milne	17
1938–39	1	38	14	7	17	68	69	35	13th	Semi	(Note: The League Cup competition did not start until the 1946–47 season.)	(Note: The Challenge Cup competition did not start until the 1990–91 season.)	(Note: European club competitions did not begin until the 1955–56 season.)		Milne	22
1939–40	Competitive football was cancelled due to the Second World War.															
1940–41	Competitive football was cancelled due to the Second World War.															
1941–42	Competitive football was cancelled due to the Second World War.															
1942–43	Competitive football was cancelled due to the Second World War.															
1943–44	Competitive football was cancelled due to the Second World War.															
1944–45	Competitive football was cancelled due to the Second World War.															
1945–46	Competitive football was cancelled due to the Second World War.															
1946–47	A	30	19	6	5	69	33	44	2nd	Final	Semi				Weir	14
1947–48	**A**	30	22	4	4	86	27	48	**1st**	Semi	Group				Smith	19
1948–49	A	30	17	5	8	75	52	39	3rd	Quarter	Group				Reilly Cuthbertson	14
1949–50	A	30	22	5	3	86	34	49	2nd	R1	Semi				Smith	25
1950–51	**A**	30	22	4	4	78	26	48	**1st**	Semi	Final				**Reilly**	**23**
1951–52	**A**	30	20	5	5	92	36	45	**1st**	R1	Group				**Reilly**	**27**
1952–53	A	30	19	5	6	93	51	43	2nd	Quarter	Semi				**Reilly**	**30**
1953–54	A	30	15	4	11	72	51	34	5th	R3	Semi				Reilly	15
1954–55	A	30	15	4	11	64	54	34	5th	R5	Group				Reilly	15
1955–56	1	34	19	7	8	86	50	45	4th	R5	Group		EC	Semi	Reilly	23
1956–57	1	34	12	9	13	69	56	33	9th	R5	Group		DNQ		Reilly	16
1957–58	1	34	13	5	16	59	60	31	9th	Final	Group		DNQ		Baker	14
1958–59	1	34	13	6	15	68	70	32	10th	Quarter	Group		DNQ		**Baker**	**25**
1959–60	1	34	14	7	13	106	85	35	7th	Quarter	Group		DNQ		**Baker**	**42**
1960–61	1	34	15	4	15	66	69	34	8th	Quarter	Group		ICFC	Semi	Baker	21
1961–62	1	34	14	5	15	58	72	33	8th	R1	Group		ICFC	R2	Falconer	12
1962–63	1	34	8	9	17	47	67	25	16th	R3	Group		ICFC	Quarter	Baker	13
1963–64	1	34	12	6	16	59	66	30	10th	R1	Semi		DNQ		Martin	19
1964–65	1	34	21	4	9	75	47	46	4th	Semi	Group		DNQ		Martin	25
1965–66	1	34	16	6	12	81	55	38	6th	R2	Semi		ICFC	R1	Cormack	15
1966–67	1	34	19	4	11	72	49	42	5th	Quarter	Group		DNQ		Cormack Davis	13
1967–68	1	34	20	5	9	67	49	45	3rd	R2	Group		ICFC	Quarter	Stein	21
1968–69	1	34	12	7	15	60	59	31	12th	R1	Final		ICFC	R3	McBride	19
1969–70	1	34	19	6	9	65	40	44	3rd	R1	Group		DNQ		McBride	20
1970–71	1	34	10	10	14	47	53	30	12th	Semi	Quarter		ICFC	R3	Baker	8
1971–72	1	34	19	6	9	62	34	44	4th	Final	Quarter		DNQ		Duncan O'Rourke	11
1972–73	1	34	19	7	8	74	33	45	3rd	R4	**Winners**		ECWC	Quarter	**Gordon**	**27**
1973–74	1	34	20	9	5	75	42	49	2nd	Quarter	Quarter		UC	R2	Gordon	16
1974–75	1	34	20	9	5	69	37	49	2nd	R3	Final		UC	R2	Duncan Harper	12
1975–76	Premier	36	18	7	11	55	43	43	3rd	Quarter	Quarter		UC	R1	Duncan	13
1976–77	Premier	36	8	18	10	34	35	34	6th	R4	Group		UC	R2	Smith	8
1977–78	Premier	36	15	7	14	52	43	37	4th	R4	R1		DNQ		MacLeod	16
1978–79	Premier	36	12	13	11	44	48	37	5th	Final	Semi		UC	R2	MacLeod	8
1979–80	Premier	36	6	6	24	29	67	18	10th	Semi	R3		DNQ		MacLeod	8
1980–81	**First**	39	25	8	6	67	22	58	**1st**	Quarter	Quarter		DNQ		MacLeod	15
1981–82	Premier	36	11	14	11	38	40	36	6th	R4	Group		DNQ		Rae	11
1982–83	Premier	36	7	15	14	35	51	29	7th	R3	Group		DNQ		Rae Murray	6
1983–84	Premier	36	12	7	17	45	55	31	7th	R3	Group		DNQ		Irvine	19
1984–85	Premier	36	10	7	19	38	61	27	8th	R3	R3		DNQ		Durie Kane	8
1985–86	Premier	36	11	6	19	49	63	28	8th	Semi	Final		DNQ		Cowan	19
1986–87	Premier	44	10	13	21	44	70	33	9th	R4	Quarter		DNQ		McCluskey	9
1987–88	Premier	44	12	19	13	41	42	43	6th	R4	Quarter		DNQ		Kane	10
1988–89	Premier	36	13	9	14	37	36	35	5th	Semi	Quarter		DNQ		Archibald	13
1989–90	Premier	36	12	10	14	34	41	34	7th	Quarter	Quarter		UC	R2	Houchen	8
1990–91	Premier	36	6	13	17	24	51	25	9th	R4	R3	NE	DNQ		Wright	6
1991–92	Premier	44	16	17	11	53	45	49	5th	Quarter	**Winners**	NE	DNQ		Weir	11
1992–93	Premier	44	12	13	19	54	64	37	7th	Semi	R3	NE	UC	R1	Jackson	13
1993–94	Premier	44	16	15	13	53	48	47	5th	R4	Final	NE	DNQ		Wright	16
1994–95	Premier	36	12	17	7	49	37	53	3rd	Semi	Quarter	NE	DNQ		Jackson Wright O'Neill	10
1995–96	Premier	36	11	10	15	43	57	43	5th	R3	R3	NE	DNQ		Wright	10
1996–97	Premier	36	9	11	16	38	55	38	9th (Note: Won promotion/relegation play-off against Airdrieonians.)	R4	Quarter	NE	DNQ		Jackson	11
1997–98	Premier	36	6	12	18	38	59	30	10th	R3	R3	NE	DNQ		Crawford	9
1998–99	**First**	36	28	5	3	84	33	89	**1st**	R3	Quarter	(Note: The competition was not operated that season.)	DNQ		Crawford	14
1999–2000	SPL	36	10	11	15	49	61	41	6th	Semi	R3	NE	DNQ		Miller	11
2000–01	SPL	38	18	12	8	57	35	66	3rd	Final	Quarter	NE	DNQ		Paatelainen	11
2001–02	SPL	38	10	11	17	51	56	41	10th	R4	Semi	NE	UC	R1	O'Connor	9
2002–03	SPL	38	15	6	17	56	64	51	7th	R4	R3	NE	DNQ		McManus	11
2003–04	SPL	38	11	11	16	41	60	44	8th	R3	Final	NE	DNQ		Riordan	15
2004–05	SPL	38	18	7	13	64	57	61	3rd	Semi	Quarter	NE	IC	R2	Riordan	20
2005–06	SPL	38	17	5	16	61	56	56	4th	Semi	Quarter	NE	UC	R1	Riordan	16
2006–07	SPL	38	13	10	15	56	46	49	6th	Semi	**Winners**	NE	IC	R3	Killen	13
2007–08	SPL	38	14	10	14	49	45	52	6th	R5	R3	NE	DNQ		Fletcher	13
2008–09	SPL	38	11	14	13	42	46	47	6th	R4	R2	NE	IC	R2	Riordan	12
2009–10	SPL	38	15	9	14	58	55	54	4th	Quarter	R3	NE	DNQ		Stokes	21
2010–11	SPL	38	10	7	21	39	61	37	10th	R4	R3	NE	UEL	QR3	Riordan	11
2011–12	SPL	38	8	9	21	40	67	33	11th	Final	Quarter	NE	DNQ		O'Connor	12
2012–13	SPL	38	13	12	13	49	52	51	7th	Final	R2	NE	DNQ		Griffiths	23
2013–14	SP	38	8	11	19	31	50	35	11th (Note: Lost promotion/relegation play-off against Hamilton Academical.)	R5	Quarter	NE	UEL	QR2	Collins Craig	6
2014–15	SC	36	21	7	8	70	32	70	2nd (Note: Lost in promotion play-offs against Rangers.)	Semi	Quarter	R1	DNQ		**Cummings**	18
2015–16	SC	36	21	7	8	59	34	70	3rd (Note: Lost in promotion play-offs against Falkirk.)	**Winners**	Final	R1	DNQ		Cummings	18
2016–17	**SC**	36	19	14	3	59	25	71	**1st**	Semi	R2	R4	UEL	QR2	**Cummings**	19
2017–18	SP	38	18	13	7	62	46	67	4th	R4	Semi	(Note: An under-20 team entered the competition.)	DNQ		Kamberi	9
2018–19	SP	38	14	12	12	51	39	54	5th	Quarter	Quarter	(Note: An under-20 team entered the competition.)	UEL	QR3	Kamberi	8
2019–20	SP (Note: The 2019–20 Scottish Premiership season was curtailed due to the COVID-19 pandemic. Hibernian had been in 6th place when the league was suspended, but were awarded 7th place in the final table as St Johnstone had a slightly higher points average.)	30	9	10	11	42	49	37	7th	Semi	Semi	(Note: An under-20 team entered the competition.)	DNQ		Doidge	12
2020–21	SP	38	18	9	11	48	35	63	3rd	Final	Semi		DNQ		Nisbet	14
2021–22	SP	38	11	12	15	38	42	45	8th	Semi	Final		ECL	QR3	Boyle	7
2022–23	SP	38	15	7	16	57	59	52	5th	R4	Group		DNQ		Nisbet	12
2023–24	SP	38	11	13	14	52	59	46	8th	Quarter	Semi		ECL	PO	Maolida	10
2024–25	SP	38	15	13	10	62	50	58	3rd	Quarter	R2		DNQ		Boyle	15
2025–26	SP	38	15	12	11	58	44	57	5th	R4	QF		UEL ECL	2QR PO	Bowie Boyle McGrath	8
2026–27	SP												ECL	PO		

== Key ==
- P = Played
- W = Games won
- D = Games drawn
- L = Games lost
- F = Goals for
- A = Goals against
- Pts = Points
- Pos = Final position
- 2 = Scottish Football League Division Two
- 1 = Scottish Football League Division One
- A = Scottish Football League Division A
- Premier = Scottish Football League Premier Division
- First = Scottish Football League First Division
- SPL = Scottish Premier League
- SP = Scottish Premiership
- SC = Scottish Championship
- EC = European Cup
- ICFC = Inter-Cities Fairs Cup
- ECWC = European Cup Winners' Cup
- UC = UEFA Cup
- UEL = UEFA Europa League
- ECL = UEFA Conference League (formerly known as the Europa Conference League)
- IC = UEFA Intertoto Cup
- DNE = Did not enter
- DNQ = Did not qualify
- NE = Not Eligible
- QR1 = First qualifying round
- QR2 = Second qualifying round
- QR3 = Third qualifying round
- PO = Play-off round
- R1 = Round 1
- R2 = Round 2
- R3 = Round 3
- R4 = Round 4
- R5 = Round 5
- R6 = Round 6
- Quarter = Quarter-finals
- Semi = Semi-finals
- Final = Runners-up

=== Colour coding ===
Champions	Runners-up	Promoted	Relegated
