= 1912–13 Hibernian F.C. season =

Hibernian
1912–13 season
- Manager: Dan McMichael
- Scottish First Division: joint 6th
- Scottish Cup: 3rd Round
- Average home league attendance: 13,721 (down 618)

During the 1912–13 season Hibernian, a football club based in Edinburgh, finished joint sixth out of 18 clubs in the Scottish First Division along with Motherwell and Aberdeen.

== Scottish First Division ==
Match Day	Date	Opponent	H/A	Score	Hibernian Scorer(s)	Attendance
1	17 August	Third Lanark	H	1–4		6,000
2	24 August	Celtic	A	1–1		15,000
3	31 August	Partick Thistle	H	1–0		8,000
4	7 September	Raith Rovers	A	2–4		6,000
5	21 September	St Mirren	H	1–1		2,000
6	28 September	Hearts	A	0–1		20,500
7	5 October	Queen's Park	H	3–0		5,000
8	12 October	Hamilton Academical	A	1–3		4,000
9	19 October	Rangers	H	0–1		16,000
10	26 October	Morton	A	3–0		6,000
11	2 November	Motherwell	A	1–5		6,000
12	9 November	Falkirk	H	3–3		7,000
13	16 November	Kilmarnock	A	1–0		4,000
14	23 November	Aberdeen	H	3–1		10,000
15	30 November	Dundee	A	2–2		6,000
16	7 December	Clyde	H	3–1		8,000
17	14 December	Raith Rovers	H	1–2		4,000
18	21 December	Aberdeen	A	3–1		4,000
19	28 December	Airdrieonians	H	2–2		5,000
20	4 January	Rangers	A	3–5		20,000
21	11 January	Morton	H	3–1		2,500
22	18 January	Celtic	H	1–0		14,000
23	25 January	Dundee	H	4–0		8,000
24	8 March	Motherwell	H	1–2		4,000
25	15 March	Third Lanark	A	0–3		3,000
26	22 March	St Mirren	A	3–0		5,000
27	29 March	Partick Thistle	A	2–1		5,000
28	5 April	Falkirk	A	2–0		6,000
29	12 April	Queen's Park	A	5–3		6,000
30	16 April	Heart of Midlothian	H	0–3		4,000
31	19 April	Kilmarnock	H	4–0		4,000
32	21 April	Hamilton Academical	H	3–1		2,000
33	26 April	Airdrieonians	A	0–1		2,000
34	29 April	Clyde	A	0–2		4,000

=== Final League table ===
P	Team	Pld	W	D	L	GF	GA	GD	Pts
5	Falkirk	34	14	12	8	56	38	18	40
=6	Hibernian	34	16	5	13	63	54	9	37
=6	Motherwell	34	12	13	9	47	39	8	37

=== Inter City Midweek League ===
Match Day	Date	Opponent	H/A	Score	Hibernian Scorer(s)	Attendance
1	16 October	Celtic	H	2–3		
2	23 October	Aberdeen	A	2–0		
3	29 October	Rangers	A	1–2		500
4	6 November	Heart of Midlothian	H	2–0		

=== Scottish Cup ===
Round	Date	Opponent	H/A	Score	Hibernian Scorer(s)	Attendance
R2	8 February	Motherwell	H	0–0		12,000
R2 R	15 February	Motherwell	A	1–1		21,000
R2 2R	19 February	Motherwell	N	2–1		12,000
R3	22 February	Raith Rovers	A	2–2		18,000
R3 R	1 March	Raith Rovers	H	0–1		23,000

== See also ==
- List of Hibernian F.C. seasons
