= 1911–12 Hibernian F.C. season =

Hibernian
1911–12 season
- Manager: Dan McMichael
- Scottish First Division: 13th
- Scottish Cup: 2nd Round
- Average home league attendance: 13,721 (down 618)

During the 1911–12 season Hibernian, a football club based in Edinburgh, finished thirteenth out of 18 clubs in the Scottish First Division.

== Scottish First Division ==
Match Day	Date	Opponent	H/A	Score	Hibernian Scorer(s)	Attendance
1	19 August	Third Lanark	A	0–2		8,000
2	26 August	Dundee	H	2–1		11,000
3	2 September	St Mirren	A	1–2		6,000
4	16 September	Partick Thistle	A	0–3		15,000
5	18 September	Third Lanark	H	3–2		4,000
6	23 September	Raith Rovers	H	3–0		5,000
7	25 September	Rangers	A	0–2		40,000
8	30 September	Hamilton Academical	A	0–3		4,000
9	7 October	Motherwell	H	1–0		5,000
10	14 October	Queen's Park	A	0–2		5,000
11	21 October	Motherwell	H	2–1		4,000
12	28 October	Celtic	A	1–3		7,000
13	4 November	Dundee	A	2–3		6,000
14	11 November	Falkirk	H	5–0		4,000
15	18 November	Celtic	H	1–1		11,000
16	25 November	Clyde	A	0–1		5,000
17	2 December	Kilmarnock	H	0–1		4,500
18	9 December	Heart of Midlothian	H	0–4		12,000
19	16 December	Morton	H	1–2		4,000
20	23 December	Aberdeen	H	1–1		6,000
21	30 December	Raith Rovers	A	2–2		5,000
22	1 January	Heart of Midlothian	A	0–3		18,000
23	6 January	Rangers	H	5–0		13,000
24	13 January	Airdireonians	A	0–1		3,000
25	20 January	Kilmarnock	A	2–1		4,000
26	17 February	Clyde	H	1–2		6,000
27	24 February	Morton	A	1–2		7,000
28	2 March	Aberdeen	A	1–1		5,000
29	9 March	Hamilton Academical	H	1–0		3,000
30	16 March	Queen's Park	H	2–0		8,000
31	23 March	Motherwell	A	2–0		2,000
32	30 March	St Mirren	H	0–0		3,000
33	6 April	Partick Thistle	H	4–0		4,000
34	20 April	Falkirk	A	0–1		4,000

=== Final League table ===
P	Team	Pld	W	D	L	GF	GA	GD	Pts
12	Hamilton Academical	34	11	8	15	32	44	–12	30
13	Hibernian	34	12	5	17	44	47	–3	29
14	Motherwell	34	11	5	18	34	44	–10	27

=== Scottish Cup ===
Round	Date	Opponent	H/A	Score	Hibernian Scorer(s)	Attendance
R2	27 January	Heart of Midlothian	A	0–0		32,000
R2 R	10 February	Heart of Midlothian	H	1–1		18,000
R2 2R	14 February	Heart of Midlothian	N	1–3		25,000

== See also ==
- List of Hibernian F.C. seasons
