= 1930–31 Hibernian F.C. season =

Hibernian
1930–31 season
- Manager: Bobby Templeton
- Scottish First Division: 19th
- Scottish Cup: R3
- Average home league attendance: 9,158 (up 922)

During the 1930–31 season Hibernian, a football club based in Edinburgh, finished nineteenth out of 20 clubs in the Scottish First Division and was relegated to the Scottish Second Division.

== Scottish First Division ==
Match Day	Date	Opponent	H/A	Score	Hibernian Scorer(s)	Attendance
1	9 August	St Mirren	A	0–1		5,000
2	16 August	Motherwell	H	2–2		19,000
3	23 August	Celtic	A	0–6		4,000
4	30 August	Leith Athletic	H	0–1		20,000
5	6 September	Ayr United	A	3–1		5,000
6	13 September	Partick Thistle	H	0–3		10,000
7	20 September	Heart of Midlothian	A	1–4		23,000
8	27 September	Dundee	H	2–3		10,000
9	4 October	Cowdenbeath	A	1–2		3,000
10	11 October	Airdrieonians	H	2–0		4,000
11	18 October	Morton	A	4–5		10,000
12	25 October	East Fife	H	2–1		7,000
13	1 November	Queen's Park	A	2–2		2,000
14	8 November	Clyde	H	1–2		2,000
15	15 November	Aberdeen	A	0–7		12,000
16	22 November	Kilmarnock	H	3–2		1,000
17	29 November	Hamilton Academical	A	0–1		1,000
18	6 December	Rangers	H	1–2		20,000
19	13 December	Falkirk	H	5–2		10,000
20	20 December	St Mirren	H	2–3		2,000
21	27 December	Motherwell	A	0–6		3,000
22	1 January	Heart of Midlothian	H	2–2		20,000
23	3 January	Celtic	H	0–0		22,000
24	5 January	Dundee	A	0–1		4,000
25	10 January	Leith Athletic	A	1–1		2,000
26	24 January	Ayr United	H	2–0		3,000
27	7 February	Cowdenbeath	H	1–0		7,000
28	10 February	Partick Thistle	A	0–1		2,000
29	18 February	Airdrieonians	A	1–4		1,500
30	21 February	Morton	H	1–1		4,000
31	28 February	East Fife	A	0–1		2,500
32	11 March	Queen's Park	H	4–2		1,000
33	14 March	Clyde	A	2–3		2,000
34	21 March	Aberdeen	H	1–2		5,000
35	4 April	Kilmarnock	A	0–4		4,000
36	11 April	Hamilton Academical	H	1–0		7,000
37	18 April	Rangers	A	0–1		10,000
38	25 April	Falkirk	A	2–2		4,000

=== Final League table ===
P	Team	Pld	W	D	L	GF	GA	GD	Pts
18	Ayr United	38	8	11	19	53	92	–39	27
19	Hibernian	38	9	7	22	49	81	–32	25
20	East Fife	38	8	4	26	45	113	–68	20

=== Scottish Cup ===
Round	Date	Opponent	H/A	Score	Hibernian Scorer(s)	Attendance
R1	17 January	St Cuthbert Wanderers	H	3–1		4,000
R2	31 January	Hamilton Academical	A	2–2		4,608
R2 R	4 February	Hamilton Academical	H	5–2		11,700
R3	14 February	Motherwell	H	0–3		34,375

== See also ==
- List of Hibernian F.C. seasons
