= 1882–83 Hibernian F.C. season =

Hibernian
1882–83 season
- Scottish Cup: Semi-finalists

Season 1882–83 was the 7th season in which Hibernian competed at a Scottish national level, entering the Scottish Cup for the 6th time.

== Overview ==
Hibs reached the quarter-final of the Scottish Cup, losing 6–0 to the Arthurlie in a replay.

== Results ==
All results are written with Hibs' score first.

=== Scottish Cup ===
Date	Round	Opponent	Venue	Result	Attendance	Scorers
16 September 1882	R1	Brunswick	H	8–0		
7 October 1882	R2	West Calder	A	3–2		
21 October 1882	R3	bye				
11 November 1882	R4	Partick	H	2–2	2,000	
18 November 1882	R4 R	Partick	A	4–1		
2 December 1882	R5	Arthurlie	H	3–4	3,000	
23 December 1882	R5 R	Arthurlie	A	0–6	3,000	

== See also ==
- List of Hibernian F.C. seasons
