= 1885–86 Hibernian F.C. season =

Hibernian
1885–86 season
- Scottish Cup: Winners

Season 1885–86 was the 10th season in which Hibernian competed at a Scottish national level, entering the Scottish Cup for the 9th time.

== Overview ==
Hibs reached the semi – final of the Scottish Cup, losing 2–0 to Renton

== Results ==
All results are written with Hibs' score first.

=== Scottish Cup ===
Date	Round	Opponent	Venue	Result	Attendance	Scorers
5 September 1885	R1	Edina	H	9–0		
3 October 1885	R2	Heart of Midlothian	H	2–1	4,000	
24 October 1885	R3	Bo'ness	H	6–0	2,000	
14 November 1885	R4	Arbroath	H	5–3		
5 December 1885	R5	Dumbarton	A	2–2	2,000	
12 December 1885	R5 R	Dumbarton	H	4–3	5,500	
16 January 1886	R6	Cambuslang	H	3–2	4,000	
23 January 1886	SF	Renton	H	0–2	5,000	

== See also ==
- List of Hibernian F.C. seasons
