= 1907–08 Hibernian F.C. season =

Hibernian
1907–08 season
- Manager: Dan McMichael
- Scottish First Division: 5th
- Scottish Cup: 3rd Round
- Average home league attendance: 13,721 (down 618)

During the 1907–08 season Hibernian, a football club based in Edinburgh, finished sixth out of 18 clubs in the Scottish First Division.

== Scottish First Division ==
Match Day	Date	Opponent	H/A	Score	Hibernian Scorer(s)	Attendance
1	17 August	Hamilton Academical	A	1–1		4,000
2	24 August	Falkirk	H	0–4		8,000
3	31 August	Port Glasgow Athletic	A	3–1		2,000
4	7 September	Aberdeen	H	1–0		8,000
5	14 September	Airdrieonians	A	2–0		5,000
6	21 September	Motherwell	H	1–1		5,000
7	28 September	Motherwell	A	0–0		5,000
8	5 October	Celtic	H	1–2		12,000
9	19 October	Kilmarnock	H	3–1		3,500
10	26 October	Clyde	A	1–1		3,000
11	2 November	Dundee	H	0–1		10,000
12	9 November	Partick Thistle	H	6–0		3,000
13	16 November	Heart of Midlothian	H	2–3		12,000
14	23 November	Rangers	A	1–1		11,000
15	30 November	Morton	H	3–0		4,000
16	7 December	Queen's Park	A	3–1		5,000
17	14 December	Kilmarnock	A	0–2		4,500
18	28 December	St Mirren	A	1–0		5,000
19	2 January	Dundee	A	1–0		11,000
20	4 January	Third Lanark	H	2–0		6,000
21	11 January	Morton	A	3–0		3,000
22	18 January	Queen's Park	H	4–1		6,000
23	1 February	Airdrieonians	H	4–0		5,000
24	29 February	Port Glasgow Athletic	H	2–1		2,000
25	7 March	Celtic	A	0–4		16,000
26	14 March	Falkirk	A	1–3		7,000
27	21 March	Clyde	H	2–1		4,000
28	28 March	Rangers	H	0–3		7,000
29	4 April	Heart of Midlothian	A	2–1		5,500
30	11 April	Third Lanark	A	0–0		5,000
31	18 April	Aberdeen	A	1–1		4,000
32	27 April	St Mirren	H	2–1		2,000
33	29 April	Hamilton Academical	H	2–5		2,000
34	30 April	Partick Thistle	A	1–1		1,000

=== Final League table ===
P	Team	Pld	W	D	L	GF	GA	GD	Pts
4	Dundee	34	20	8	5	74	40	34	48
5	Hibernian	34	17	8	9	55	42	13	42
6	Airdrieonians	34	18	5	11	58	41	17	41

=== Scottish Cup ===
Round	Date	Opponent	H/A	Score	Hibernian Scorer(s)	Attendance
R1	25 January	Abercorn	H	5–0		2,000
R2	8 February	Morton	H	3–0		6,000
R3	22 February	Kilmarnock	H	0–1		11,000

== See also ==
- List of Hibernian F.C. seasons
