= 1879–80 Hibernian F.C. season =

Hibernian
1879–80 season
- Scottish Cup: QF

Season 1879–80 was the third in which Hibernian competed at a Scottish national level, entering the Scottish Cup for the third time.

== Overview ==
Hibs reached the quarter-final of the Scottish Cup, losing 6–2 to Dumbarton.

Hibs defeated Edinburgh derby rivals Hearts in the third round, in a match played at Mayfield Park, in the Mayfield area of Edinburgh.

== Results ==
All results are written with Hibs' score first.

=== Scottish Cup ===
| Date | Round | Opponent | Venue | Result | Attendance | Scorers |
|---|---|---|---|---|---|---|
| 20 September 1879 | R1 | Hanover | H | 5–1 | | Cox, Donnelly (3), Lee |
| 11 October 1879 | R2 | Dunfermline | H | 4–0 | | |
| 15 November 1879 | R3 | Hearts | H | 2–1 | 2500 | Byrne, Cavanagh |
| 22 November 1879 | R4 | Parkgrove | H | 2–2 | | |
| 29 November 1879 | R4R | Parkgrove | A | 2–2 | | |
| 20 December 1879 | R5 | Mauchline | A | 2–0 | | Quinn (2) |
| 3 January 1880 | QF | Dumbarton | A | 2–6 | 2000 | Rourke (2) |

== See also ==
- List of Hibernian F.C. seasons
