= 1890–91 Hibernian F.C. season =

Hibernian
1890–91 season
- Scottish Cup: R2

Season 1890–91 was the 14th season in which Hibernian competed at a Scottish national level, entering the Scottish Cup for the 14th time.

== Overview ==
Hibs reached the second round of the Scottish Cup, losing 9–1 to Dumbarton.

== Results ==
All results are written with Hibs' score first.

=== Scottish Cup ===
Date	Round	Opponent	Venue	Result	Attendance	Scorers
6 September 1890	R1	Kirkcaldy Wanderers	A	4–3		
27 September 1890	R2	Dumbarton	H	1–9	3,000	

=== Edinburgh International Exhibition Cup ===
6 August 1890 Edinburgh International Exhibition Cup	Hibernian	0–2	Hearts	Edinburgh Exhibition Ground (Meggetland)
			Scott 10'; Jenkinson	Attendance: 15,000; Referee: T. Gilhooly

== See also ==
- List of Hibernian F.C. seasons
