= 1959–60 Hibernian F.C. season =

Hibernian
1959–60 season
- Manager: Hugh Shaw
- Scottish First Division: 7th
- Scottish Cup: R4
- Scottish League Cup: GS
- Highest home attendance: 54,000 (v Heart of Midlothian, 1 January)
- Lowest home attendance: 4000 (v Arbroath, 16 April)
- Average home league attendance: 16,559 (up 1941)

During the 1959–60 season Hibernian, a football club based in Edinburgh, came seventh out of 18 clubs in the Scottish First Division.

== Scottish First Division ==
Match Day	Date	Opponent	H/A	Score	Hibernian Scorer(s)	Attendance
1	19 August	Aberdeen	H	2–1		12,000
2	5 September	Heart of Midlothian	A	2–2		40,000
3	12 September	Rangers	H	0–1		31,500
4	19 September	Third Lanark	A	3–5		9,000
5	26 September	Kilmarnock	H	4–2		20,000
6	3 October	Clyde	A	1–2		7,000
7	10 October	Motherwell	H	1–3		18,000
8	17 October	Dunfermline Athletic	H	7–4		10,000
9	24 October	Airdrieonians	A	11–1		7,000
10	31 October	Celtic	H	3–3		28,000
11	7 November	St Mirren	A	3–2		16,000
12	14 November	Raith Rovers	A	2–4		8,000
13	21 November	Dundee	H	4–2		16,000
14	28 November	Stirling Albion	H	3–1		15,000
14	5 December	Arbroath	A	2–3		4,600
15	12 December	Ayr United	H	5–1		12,000
17	19 December	Partick Thistle	A	10–2		10,000
18	26 December	Aberdeen	A	4–6		15,000
19	1 January	Heart of Midlothian	H	1–5		54,000
19	2 January	Rangers	A	1–1		56,000
20	9 January	Third Lanark	H	6–0		15,000
21	16 January	Kilmarnock	A	1–3		17,448
23	23 January	Clyde	H	5–5		15,000
24	6 February	Motherwell	A	4–3		12,599
25	27 February	Dunfermline Athletic	A	2–2		9,000
26	7 March	Celtic	A	0–1		19,000
27	16 March	St Mirren	H	1–3		9,000
28	19 March	Raith Rovers	H	0–3		8,000
29	26 March	Dundee	A	3–6		8,000
30	30 March	Airdireonians	H	3–3		7,000
31	2 April	Stirling Albion	A	3–2		5,036
32	16 April	Arbroath	H	5–0		4,000
33	22 April	Ayr United	A	1–2		5,000
34	30 April	Partick Thistle	H	2–2		7,000

=== Final League table ===
P	Team	Pld	W	D	L	GF	GA	GD	Pts
6	Clyde	34	15	9	10	77	69	8	39
7	Hibernian	34	14	7	13	106	85	21	35
9	Ayr United	34	14	6	14	65	73	–8	34

=== Scottish League Cup ===
==== Group stage ====
Round	Date	Opponent	H/A	Score	Hibernian Scorer(s)	Attendance
G4	8 August	Rangers	H	1–6		44,700
G4	12 August	Dundee	A	3–4		17,000
G4	15 August	Motherwell	H	1–3		25,000
G4	22 August	Rangers	A	1–5		35,000
G4	26 August	Dundee	H	1–3		17,000
G4	29 August	Motherwell	A	2–4		15,000

==== Group 4 final table ====
P	Team	Pld	W	D	L	GF	GA	GD	Pts
1	Motherwell	6	6	0	0	19	8	11	12'
2	Rangers	6	4	0	2	18	8	10	8
3	Dundee	6	2	0	4	12	17	–5	4
4	Hibernian	6	0	0	6	9	25	–16	0

=== Scottish Cup ===
Round	Date	Opponent	H/A	Score	Hibernian Scorer(s)	Attendance
R2	29 February	Dundee	H	3–0		30,419
R3	5 March	East Stirlingshire	A	3–0		8,500
R4	12 March	Rangers	A	2–3		63,000

=== Friendly matches ===
On 2 November 1959, Hibs played a friendly against Middlesbrough at Easter Road. Joe Baker scored a hat-trick for Hibs in a 6–6 draw.

== See also ==
- List of Hibernian F.C. seasons
