= 1901–02 Hibernian F.C. season =

Hibernian
1901–02 season
- Manager: Dan McMichael
- Scottish First Division: 6th
- Scottish Cup: Winners
- Average home league attendance: 13,721 (down 618)

During the 1901–02 season Hibernian, a football club based in Edinburgh, finished sixth out of 10 clubs in the Scottish First Division.

== Scottish First Division ==
Match Day	Date	Opponent	H/A	Score	Hibernian Scorer(s)	Attendance
1	17 August	Heart of Midlothian	A	1–2		5,000
2	24 August	St Mirren	H	1–2		4,000
3	31 August	Kilmarnock	A	0–0		5,500
4	7 September	Queen's Park	H	8–1		7,000
5	14 September	Heart of Midlothian	H	1–2		12,000
6	16 September	Celtic	H	1–2		6,000
7	21 September	Dundee	A	0–1		5,000
8	23 September	Rangers	A	2–0		10,000
9	5 October	Third Lanark	H	2–2		5,500
10	12 October	Morton	A	2–0		4,000
11	19 October	Rangers	H	2–3		12,000
12	26 October	Morton	H	1–2		3,000
13	2 November	St Mirren	A	1–1		4,000
14	9 November	Queen's Park	A	0–2		5,000
15	16 November	Kilmarnock	H	5–0		4,000
16	30 November	Dundee	H	5–0		3,000
17	14 December	Celtic	A	2–2		7,000
18	1 March	Third Lanark	A	2–1		5,000

=== Final League table ===
P	Team	Pld	W	D	L	GF	GA	GD	Pts
5	St Mirren	18	8	3	7	29	28	1	19
6	Hibernian	18	6	4	8	36	24	12	16
7	Kilmarnock	22	5	6	7	21	25	–4	16

=== Scottish Cup ===
Round	Date	Opponent	H/A	Score	Hibernian Scorer(s)	Attendance
R1	11 January	Clyde	H	2–0		2,000
R2	25 January	Port Glasgow Athletic	A	5–1		4,000
R3	7 February	Queen's Park	A	7–1		14,800
SF	22 March	Rangers	H	2–0		38,000
F	26 April	Celtic	N	1–0		16,000

== See also ==
- List of Hibernian F.C. seasons
