= 1940–41 Hibernian F.C. season =

Hibernian
1940–41 season
- Manager: Willie McCartney
- Southern League: 3rd
- Summer Cup: W
- Southern League Cup: GS
- Average home league attendance: No Attendances Available (league suspended)

During the 1940–41 season Hibernian, a football club based in Edinburgh, came third out of 16 clubs in the Southern Football League.

== Southern League ==
Match Day	Date	Opponent	H/A	Score	Hibernian Scorer(s)	Attendance
1	10 August	Queen's Park	H	3–2		
2	17 August	Rangers	A	1–5		
3	24 August	Morton	H	2–1		
4	31 August	Clyde	A	1–2		
5	7 September	Heart of Midlothian	H	2–1		
6	14 September	Hamilton Academical	A	3–2		
7	21 September	Albion Rovers	H	1–1		
8	28 September	Dumbarton	A	0–2		
9	5 October	Partick Thistle	H	4–0		
10	12 October	St Mirren	A	4–4		
11	19 October	Third Lanark	H	2–2		
12	26 October	Celtic	A	4–0		
13	2 November	Motherwell	H	3–3		
14	9 November	Falkirk	H	7–1		
14	16 November	Airdrieonians	A	2–4		
15	23 November	Queen's Park	A	5–2		
17	30 November	Rangers	H	1–0		
18	7 December	Morton	A	1–3		
19	14 December	Clyde	H	2–2		
20	21 December	Albion Rovers	A	3–4		
21	28 December	Hamilton Academical	H	3–1		
22	11 January	Partick Thistle	A	2–1		21,525
23	18 January	St Mirren	H	2–4		
24	25 January	Third Lanark	A	2–3		
25	1 February	Celtic	H	2–0		
26	8 February	Motherwell	A	0–1		
27	15 February	Falkirk	A	2–2		
28	12 April	Airdrieonians	H	2–2		
29	26 April	Dumbarton	H	3–1		
30	28 April	Heart of Midlothian	A	5–3		3,004

=== Final League table ===
P	Team	Pld	W	D	L	GF	GA	GD	Pts
2	Clyde	30	18	7	5	99	61	38	43
3	Hibernian	30	14	7	9	74	61	13	35
4	Airdrieonians	30	13	8	9	75	62	13	34

=== Southern League Cup ===
==== Group stage ====
Round	Date	Opponent	H/A	Score	Hibernian Scorer(s)	Attendance
GD	1 March	Clyde	A	4–2		
GD	8 March	Heart of Midlothian	H	3–2		
GD	15 March	Queen's Park	A	1–2		
GD	22 March	Clyde	H	5–4		
GD	29 March	Heart of Midlothian	A	2–5		
GD	5 April	Queen's Park	H	0–0		

==== Group D final table ====
P	Team	Pld	W	D	L	GF	GA	GD	Pts
1	Heart of Midlothian	6	4	0	2	14	7	7	8
2	Hibernian	6	3	1	2	15	15	0	7
3	Clyde	6	2	1	3	12	14	–2	5
4	Queen's Park	6	1	2	3	4	9	–5	4

=== Summer Cup ===
Round	Date	Opponent	H/A	Score	Hibernian Scorer(s)	Attendance
R1 L1	7 June	Celtic	A	5–3		
R1 L2	14 June	Celtic	H	1–0		
R2 L1	21 June	Clyde	H	1–2		
R2 L2	28 June	Clyde	A	4–3		
R2 R	2 July	Clyde	N	2–1		8,000
SF	5 July	Dumbarton	N	1–0		
F	12 July	Rangers	N	3–2		

== See also ==
- List of Hibernian F.C. seasons
