= 1878–79 Hibernian F.C. season =

Hibernian
1878–79 season
- Scottish Cup: R5

Season 1878–79 was the second in which Hibernian competed at a Scottish national level, entering the Scottish Cup for the second time.

== Overview ==
Hibs reached the fifth round of the Scottish Cup, losing 2–1 to Helensburgh.

The club began using a ground in the Powderhall area of Edinburgh during this season.

== Results ==
All results are written with Hibs' score first.

=== Scottish Cup ===
Date	Round	Opponent	Venue	Result	Attendance	Scorers
28 September 1878	R1	Dunfermline	H	5–2		
19 October 1878	R2	3rd Edinburgh RV	H	3–0		Quinn, Donnelly, Heron
16 November 1878	R3	Edinburgh University	A	5–2		Flynn (2), Rourke (3)
7 December 1878	R4	Rob Roy	H	9–0		
8 March 1879	R5	Helensburgh	A	1–2		Donnelly

== See also ==
- List of Hibernian F.C. seasons
