= 1923–24 Hibernian F.C. season =

Hibernian
1923–24 season
- Manager: Alex Maley
- Scottish First Division: 7th
- Scottish Cup: F
- Average home league attendance: 11,105 (down 2,526)

During the 1923–24 season Hibernian, a football club based in Edinburgh, finished seventh out of 20 clubs in the Scottish First Division.

== Scottish First Division ==
Match Day	Date	Opponent	H/A	Score	Hibernian Scorer(s)	Attendance
1	18 August	Third Lanark	A	4–1		10,000
2	25 August	Aberdeen	H	0–1		18,000
3	1 September	Kilmarnock	A	1–2		10,000
4	8 September	Heart of Midlothian	H	1–1		20,000
5	15 September	Airdrieonians	A	1–1		10,000
6	17 September	Celtic	H	0–0		14,000
7	22 September	Motherwell	H	2–4		12,000
8	29 September	Queen's Park	A	1–1		15,000
9	6 October	Raith Rovers	H	4–0		12,000
10	13 October	St Mirren	A	1–1		5,000
11	20 October	Rangers	H	1–3		22,000
12	27 October	Dundee	A	2–7		12,000
13	3 November	Hamilton Academical	H	1–3		22,000
14	10 November	Ayr United	A	2–2		4,000
15	17 November	Clyde	H	3–1		6,000
16	24 November	Morton	H	2–1		3,000
17	1 December	Partick Thistle	A	0–1		7,000
18	8 December	Falkirk	A	1–1		6,000
19	15 December	Clydebank	H	3–2		12,000
20	22 December	Queen's Park	H	4–0		6,000
21	29 December	Morton	A	0–1		3,000
22	1 January	Heart of Midlothian	A	1–1		26,000
23	2 January	Aberdeen	A	1–1		11,000
24	5 January	Falkirk	H	1–0		10,000
25	12 January	Raith Rovers	A	2–0		10,000
26	19 January	Third Lanark	H	5–2		14,000
27	2 February	Ayr United	H	3–0		4,000
28	16 February	Dundee	H	2–0		10,000
29	20 February	Clydebank	A	4–2		2,000
30	27 February	Kilmarnock	H	3–1		4,000
31	1 March	Clyde	A	0–2		4,000
32	15 March	Motherwell	A	1–2		2,000
33	2 April	St Mirren	H	1–1		4,000
34	5 April	Rangers	A	1–2		12,000
35	12 April	Airdrieonians	H	2–0		12,000
36	16 April	Partick Thistle	H	3–1		6,000
37	23 April	Hamilton Academical	A	1–2		1,000
38	26 April	Celtic	A	1–1		5,000

=== Final League table ===
P	Team	Pld	W	D	L	GF	GA	GD	Pts
6	St Mirren	38	15	12	11	53	45	8	42
7	Hibernian	38	15	11	12	66	52	14	41
8	Partick Thistle	38	15	9	14	58	55	3	39

=== Scottish Cup ===
Round	Date	Opponent	H/A	Score	Hibernian Scorer(s)	Attendance
R1	26 January	Dundee United	H	1–0		16,000
R2	9 February	Alloa Athletic	H	1–1		12,000
R2 R	12 February	Alloa Athletic	A	5–0		3,500
R3	23 February	Rangers	A	2–1		52,885
R4	8 March	Partick Thistle	H	2–2		15,000
R4 R	12 March	Partick Thistle	A	1–1		35,000
R4 2R	18 March	Partick Thistle	N	2–1		27,000
SF	22 March	Aberdeen	N	0–0		19,000
SF R	26 March	Aberdeen	N	0–0		14,000
SF 2R	9 April	Aberdeen	N	1–0		12,000
F	19 April	Airdrieonians	N	0–2		59,218

== See also ==
- List of Hibernian F.C. seasons
