= 1991–92 Dundee United F.C. season =

Dundee United
1991-92 season
- Chairman: Jim McLean
- Manager: Jim McLean
- Stadium: Tannadice Park
- Premier Division: Fourth place
- Scottish Cup: Fourth round
- League Cup: Quarter-finals
- Top goalscorer: League: Duncan Ferguson (14); All: Duncan Ferguson (16)
- Highest home attendance: 16,535 vs. Celtic, Premier Division, 10 August 1991
- Lowest home attendance: 4,256 vs. Montrose, League Cup, 20 August 1991
| Home colours | Away colours |

The 1991–92 season was the 83rd year of football played by Dundee United, and covers the period from 1 July 1991 to 30 June 1992. United finished in fourth place in what was Jim McLean's penultimate season as manager.

== Summary ==
Dundee United played a total of 49 competitive matches during the 1991–92 season. The team finished fourth in the Scottish Premier Division.

In the cup competitions, United lost in the fourth round of the Scottish Cup to Celtic and lost in the League Cup quarter-finals to eventual finalists Dunfermline Athletic.

The club signed five players during the season with a total public cost of nearly £400,000. In addition, one player played whilst on trial but left shortly afterwards. Four players were sold by the club during the season with a public total of £1.15m. The club made a profit of around £750k from transfers during the season.

The club's playing kits were sponsored by Belhaven Brewery for the fifth and penultimate season.

== Results and fixtures ==
| Win | Draw | Loss |

All results are written with Dundee United's score first.

=== Scottish Premier Division ===
| Date | Opponent | Venue | Result | Attendance | Scorers |
|---|---|---|---|---|---|
| 10 August 1991 | Celtic | H | 3–4 | 16,535 | M O'Neill (2), Ferguson |
| 13 August 1991 | St Mirren | H | 4–1 | 5,771 | McKinlay, Jackson (2), M O'Neill |
| 17 August 1991 | St Johnstone | A | 1–1 | 7,700 | Jackson |
| 24 August 1991 | Hibernian | A | 0–1 | 9,420 | |
| 31 August 1991 | Aberdeen | H | 0–0 | 11,962 | |
| 7 September 1991 | Dunfermline Athletic | H | 3–0 | 11,962 | Bowman, Van der Hoorn, Ferguson |
| 14 September 1991 | Rangers | A | 1–1 | 36,347 | Ferguson |
| 21 September 1991 | Heart of Midlothian | A | 1–1 | 11,746 | Ferguson |
| 28 September 1991 | Motherwell | H | 2–2 | 6,844 | Bollan, Malpas |
| 5 October 1991 | Falkirk | A | 4–0 | 5,377 | Ferreyra (2), Ferguson, Paatelainen |
| 8 October 1991 | Airdrieonians | H | 0–0 | 5,763 | |
| 12 October 1991 | Celtic | A | 1–4 | 28,745 | M O'Neill |
| 19 October 1991 | St Johnstone | H | 1–2 | 7,700 | French |
| 26 October 1991 | Airdrieonians | A | 3–1 | 3,500 | Clark, Ferguson, Paatelainen |
| 29 October 1991 | Rangers | H | 3–2 | 14,397 | McKinnon, Jackson, Ferguson |
| 2 November 1991 | Aberdeen | A | 1–0 | 13,728 | McInally |
| 6 November 1991 | Dunfermline Athletic | A | 1–0 | 3,528 | Jackson, Bowman |
| 9 November 1991 | Hibernian | H | 1–1 | 9,420 | McKinnon |
| 16 November 1991 | Falkirk | H | 2–1 | 7,290 | Ferreyra, Whittaker |
| 23 November 1991 | Heart of Midlothian | H | 0–1 | 12,796 | |
| 30 November 1991 | St Mirren | A | 1–1 | 3,500 | Cleland |
| 3 December 1991 | Motherwell | A | 1–1 | 4,023 | Jackson |
| 7 December 1991 | Celtic | H | 1–1 | 11,145 | Welsh |
| 14 December 1991 | Dunfermline Athletic | H | 0–0 | 4,835 | |
| 21 December 1991 | Rangers | A | 0–2 | 41,448 | |
| 28 December 1991 | Hibernian | A | 2–3 | 7,704 | Malpas, Paatelainen |
| 1 January 1992 | Aberdeen | H | 4–0 | 7,608 | Jackson (2), Ferguson, Paatelainen |
| 4 January 1992 | Falkirk | A | 3–1 | 5,186 | McKinnon, Jackson (2) |
| 11 January 1992 | Airdrieonians | H | 2–1 | 6,056 | Jackson, Ferreyra |
| 18 January 1992 | St Mirren | H | 1–3 | 4,933 | McInally |
| 1 February 1992 | St Johnstone | A | 1–1 | 6,364 | Ferguson |
| 8 February 1992 | Heart of Midlothian | A | 0–1 | 10,516 | |
| 22 February 1992 | Motherwell | H | 2–2 | 4,746 | Cleland, Ferguson |
| 29 February 1992 | Falkirk | H | 2–1 | 5,592 | Paatelainen (2) |
| 7 March 1992 | Dunfermline Athletic | A | 0–1 | 3,042 | |
| 14 March 1992 | Hibernian | H | 1–0 | 5,588 | Cleland |
| 17 March 1992 | Airdrieonians | A | 0–1 | 3,284 | |
| 21 March 1992 | Aberdeen | A | 2–0 | 10,500 | McInally, Ferreyra |
| 28 March 1992 | Celtic | A | 1–3 | 22,522 | Ferguson |
| 4 April 1992 | St Johnstone | H | 2–1 | 5,553 | Cleland, Bowman |
| 11 April 1992 | Rangers | H | 1–2 | 11,391 | McInally |
| 18 April 1992 | Heart of Midlothian | H | 2–0 | 6,711 | Malpas, Ferguson |
| 25 April 1992 | St Mirren | A | 1–0 | 1,871 | Ferguson |
| 2 May 1992 | Motherwell | A | 2–1 | 3,151 | Johnson, Ferguson |

=== Scottish Cup ===
| Date | Round | Opponent | Venue | Result | Attendance | Scorers |
|---|---|---|---|---|---|---|
| 26 January 1992 | Third round | Berwick Rangers | H | 6–0 | 5,263 | Malpas, Ferguson (2), Ferreyra, J O'Neil, Garner |
| 11 February 1992 | Fourth round | Celtic | A | 1–2 | 26,225 | Paatelainen |

=== Scottish League Cup ===
| Date | Opponent | Venue | Result | Attendance | Scorers | |
|---|---|---|---|---|---|---|
| 20 August 1991 | Second round | Montrose | H | 3–2 | 4,256 | Clark, M O'Neill, Paatelainen |
| 27 August 1991 | Third round | Falkirk | H | 1–0 | 6,737 | French |
| 3 September 1991 | Quarter–finals | Dunfermline Athletic | A | 1–3 | 7,220 | Paatelainen |

== Player statistics ==
During the 1991–92 season, United used 27 different players comprising six nationalities. For the second successive season, Maurice Malpas was the only player to play in every match. The table below shows the number of appearances and goals scored by each player.

| No. | Pos | Nat | Player | Total | | Premier Division | | Scottish Cup | | League Cup | |
| No. | Pos | Nat | Player | Apps | Goals | Apps | Goals | Apps | Goals | Apps | Goals |
|---|---|---|---|---|---|---|---|---|---|---|---|
| | GK | (Scotland) SCO | Alan Main | 19 | 0 | 17 | 0 | 0 | 0 | 2 | 0 |
| | GK | (Netherlands) NED | Guido van de Kamp | 30 | 0 | 27 | 0 | 2 | 0 | 1 | 0 |
| | DF | (Scotland) SCO | Gary Bollan | 13 | 1 | 10 | 1 | 1 | 0 | 2 | 0 |
| | DF | (Scotland) SCO | John Clark | 39 | 2 | 34 | 1 | 2 | 0 | 3 | 1 |
| | DF | (Scotland) SCO | Alex Cleland | 34 | 4 | 32 | 4 | 1 | 0 | 1 | 0 |
| | DF | (Netherlands) NED | Fred van der Hoorn | 46 | 1 | 41 | 1 | 2 | 0 | 3 | 0 |
| | DF | (Scotland) SCO | Maurice Malpas | 49 | 4 | 44 | 3 | 2 | 1 | 3 | 0 |
| | DF | (Germany) GER | Jochen Müller | 6 | 0 | 5 | 0 | 0 | 0 | 1 | 0 |
| | DF | (Scotland) SCO | Dave Narey | 26 | 0 | 24 | 0 | 0 | 0 | 2 | 0 |
| | DF | (Scotland) SCO | Brian Welsh | 11 | 1 | 11 | 1 | 0 | 0 | 0 | 0 |
| | MF | (Scotland) SCO | Dave Bowman | 46 | 3 | 41 | 3 | 2 | 0 | 3 | 0 |
| | MF | (Scotland) SCO | Grant Johnson | 10 | 1 | 10 | 1 | 0 | 0 | 0 | 0 |
| | MF | (Scotland) SCO | Jim McInally | 34 | 4 | 32 | 4 | 2 | 0 | 0 | 0 |
| | MF | (Scotland) SCO | Billy McKinlay | 25 | 1 | 22 | 1 | 0 | 0 | 3 | 0 |
| | MF | (Scotland) SCO | Ray McKinnon | 25 | 4 | 25 | 4 | 0 | 0 | 0 | 0 |
| | MF | (Scotland) SCO | Andy McLaren | 16 | 0 | 13 | 0 | 0 | 0 | 3 | 0 |
| | MF | (Scotland) SCO | John O'Neil | 14 | 1 | 12 | 0 | 2 | 1 | 0 | 0 |
| | MF | (Northern Ireland) NIR | Michael O'Neill | 10 | 5 | 8 | 4 | 0 | 0 | 2 | 1 |
| | MF | (Argentina) ARG | José Luis Pochettino | 2 | 0 | 2 | 0 | 0 | 0 | 0 | 0 |
| | MF | (Scotland) SCO | Allan Preston | 2 | 0 | 2 | 0 | 0 | 0 | 0 | 0 |
| | FW | (Scotland) SCO | Paddy Connolly | 6 | 0 | 5 | 0 | 1 | 0 | 0 | 0 |
| | FW | (Scotland) SCO | Christian Dailly | 8 | 0 | 8 | 0 | 0 | 0 | 0 | 0 |
| | FW | (Scotland) SCO | Duncan Ferguson | 41 | 16 | 38 | 14 | 2 | 2 | 1 | 0 |
| | FW | (Argentina) ARG | Victor Ferreyra | 25 | 6 | 23 | 5 | 2 | 1 | 0 | 0 |
| | FW | (Scotland) SCO | Hamish French | 8 | 2 | 6 | 1 | 0 | 0 | 2 | 1 |
| | FW | (Scotland) SCO | Darren Jackson | 31 | 11 | 28 | 11 | 2 | 0 | 1 | 0 |
| | FW | (Finland) FIN | Mixu Paatelainen | 34 | 9 | 29 | 6 | 2 | 1 | 3 | 2 |

=== Goalscorers ===
United had 18 players score with the team scoring 78 goals in total. The top goalscorer was Duncan Ferguson, who finished the season with 16 goals.

| Name | League | Cups | Total |
|---|---|---|---|
| Duncan Ferguson | 14 | 2 | 16 |
| Darren Jackson | 11 | 0 | 11 |
| Mixu Paatelainen | 6 | 3 | 9 |
| Victor Ferreyra | 5 | 1 | 6 |
| Michael O'Neill | 4 | 1 | 5 |
| Alex Cleland | 4 | 0 | 4 |
| Jim McInally | 4 | 0 | 4 |
| Maurice Malpas | 4 | 0 | 4 |
| Alex Cleland | 3 | 1 | 4 |
| Dave Bowman | 3 | 0 | 3 |
| John Clark | 1 | 1 | 2 |
| Hamish French | 1 | 1 | 2 |
| Own goals | 1 | 1 | 2 |
| Gary Bollan | 1 | 0 | 1 |
| Fred van der Hoorn | 1 | 0 | 1 |
| Grant Johnson | 1 | 0 | 1 |
| Billy McKinlay | 1 | 0 | 1 |
| Brian Welsh | 1 | 0 | 1 |
| John O'Neil | 0 | 1 | 1 |

=== Discipline ===
During the 1991–92 season, two United players were sent off. Statistics for cautions are unavailable.

| Name | Dismissals |
|---|---|
| Alex Cleland | (red card) 1 |
| David Narey | (red card) 1 |

== Competitions ==
=== League table ===
| Pos | Team | Pld | W | D | L | GF | GA | GD | Pts | Qualification or relegation |
|---|---|---|---|---|---|---|---|---|---|---|
| 2 | Heart of Midlothian | 44 | 27 | 9 | 8 | 60 | 37 | +23 | 63 | Qualification for the UEFA Cup first round |
| 3 | Celtic | 44 | 26 | 10 | 8 | 88 | 42 | +46 | 62 | Qualification for the UEFA Cup first round |
| 4 | Dundee United | 44 | 19 | 13 | 12 | 66 | 50 | +16 | 51 | |
| 5 | Hibernian | 44 | 16 | 17 | 11 | 53 | 45 | +8 | 49 | Qualification for the UEFA Cup first round |
| 6 | Aberdeen | 44 | 17 | 14 | 13 | 55 | 42 | +13 | 48 | |

Rules for classification: 1) points; 2) goal difference; 3) number of goals scored.

== Transfers ==
=== In ===
| Date | Player | From | Fee |
|---|---|---|---|
| 11 July 1991 | (Germany) Jochen Müller | (Germany) Waldhof Mannheim | Unknown |
| 11 July 1991 | (Netherlands) Guido van de Kamp | (Netherlands) Den Bosch | £40,000 |
| 4 September 1991 | (Scotland) David Hannah | (Scotland) Hamilton Thistle | Unknown |
| 26 September 1991 | (Argentina) Victor Ferreyra | (Argentina) San Lorenzo | £350,000 |
| 11 January 1992 | (Scotland) Robbie Winters | (Scotland) Muirend Amateurs | Unknown |
| 2 April 1992 | (Argentina) José Luis Pochettino | (Mexico) Cobras de Querétaro | Trial |

=== Out ===
| Date | Player | To | Fee |
|---|---|---|---|
| 10 July 1992 | (Scotland) Billy Thomson | (Scotland) Motherwell | Unknown |
| 23 October 1992 | (Scotland) Hamish French | (Scotland) Dunfermline Athletic | Unknown |
| 28 March 1992 | (Finland) Mixu Paatelainen | (Scotland) Aberdeen | £400,000 |

== See also ==
- 1991–92 in Scottish football
