= 1992–93 Dundee United F.C. season =

Dundee United
1992–93 season
- Chairman: Jim McLean
- Manager: Jim McLean
- Stadium: Tannadice Park
- Premier Division: Fourth place
- Scottish Cup: Fourth round
- League Cup: Quarter-finals
- Top goalscorer: League: Paddy Connolly (16); All: Paddy Connolly (19)
- Highest home attendance: 13,515 vs. Rangers, Premier Division, 26 September 1992
- Lowest home attendance: 4,200 vs. Airdrieonians, Premier Division, 17 April 1993
| Home colours | Away colours |

The 1992–93 season was the 84th year of football played by Dundee United, and covers the period from 1 July 1992 to 30 June 1993. United finished in fourth place in what was Jim McLean's final season as manager.

== Summary ==
Dundee United played a total of 49 competitive matches during the 1992–93 season. The team finished fourth in the Scottish Premier Division.

In the cup competitions, United lost in the fourth round of the Scottish Cup to Aberdeen and lost narrowly in the League Cup quarter-finals to Rangers.

In February 1993, Jim McLean announced he would resign as manager at the end of the season, ending 22 years in the post.

The club signed only one player – Scott Crabbe – during the season, as part of a swap deal. No money was spent on transfer fees. Five players were sold by the club during the season with one as part of a swap deal. The club raised over £1.25m in transfer sales.

The jerseys were sponsored by Belhaven Brewery for the final time, ending six years of association with the brewers.

In the 4–0 victory at Partick Thistle on 13 February, referee Leslie Mottram ruled Paddy Connolly's goal – where the ball rebounded back from the inside stanchion – hadn't crossed the line. To make matters worse for United, a Partick defender picked the ball up with his hands, only for the referee to rule play on. The decision denied Connolly his first senior hat-trick.

== Results and fixtures ==
All results are written with Dundee United's score first.

=== Scottish Premier Division ===
| Date | Opponent | Venue | Result | Attendance | Scorers |
|---|---|---|---|---|---|
| 1 August 1992 | Motherwell | A | 1–0 | 5,037 | Ferguson |
| 4 August 1992 | Partick Thistle | A | 1–0 | 4,906 | Connolly |
| 8 August 1992 | Heart of Midlothian | H | 1–1 | 9,112 | Ferguson |
| 15 August 1992 | Celtic | A | 0–2 | 30,520 | |
| 22 August 1992 | St Johnstone | H | 2–1 | 7,353 | O'Neil, Connolly |
| 29 August 1992 | Falkirk | H | 2–0 | 5,444 | Ferguson (2) |
| 2 September 1992 | Hibernian | A | 1–2 | 7,752 | Connolly |
| 12 September 1992 | Airdrieonians | A | 2–1 | 2,733 | Ferguson (2) |
| 19 September 1992 | Dundee | H | 0–1 | 12,456 | |
| 26 September 1992 | Rangers | H | 0–4 | 13,515 | |
| 3 October 1992 | Aberdeen | A | 1–0 | 12,936 | Ferguson |
| 7 October 1992 | Motherwell | H | 1–1 | 5,350 | Connolly |
| 17 October 1992 | Heart of Midlothian | A | 0–1 | 8,209 | |
| 24 October 1992 | Falkirk | A | 1–1 | 4,471 | McInally |
| 31 October 1992 | Hibernian | H | 1–0 | 6,951 | McInally |
| 7 November 1992 | St Johnstone | A | 0–2 | 5,513 | |
| 11 November 1992 | Celtic | H | 1–1 | 11,096 | Galloway |
| 21 November 1992 | Dundee | A | 3–1 | 12,018 | Bollan, Connolly, Clark |
| 28 November 1992 | Airdrieonians | H | 0–0 | 5,178 | |
| 1 December 1992 | Partick Thistle | H | 2–1 | 5,241 | McInally, O'Neil |
| 12 December 1992 | Aberdeen | H | 2–2 | 10,341 | Crabbe, McKinlay |
| 26 December 1992 | Celtic | A | 1–0 | 22,852 | Ferguson |
| 2 January 1993 | St Johnstone | H | 1–2 | 10,318 | Crabbe |
| 5 January 1993 | Rangers | A | 2–3 | 40,239 | Welsh, Perry |
| 16 January 1993 | Hibernian | A | 1–2 | 5,531 | McInally |
| 23 January 1993 | Falkirk | H | 2–1 | 5,626 | Crabbe, Connolly |
| 30 January 1993 | Heart of Midlothian | H | 0–1 | 7,723 | |
| 2 February 1993 | Motherwell | A | 0–2 | 3,783 | Connolly |
| 13 February 1993 | Partick Thistle | A | 4–0 | 4,135 | Crabbe, Connolly (2), Ferguson |
| 20 February 1993 | Rangers | H | 0–0 | 13,234 | |
| 24 February 1993 | Aberdeen | A | 0–0 | 12,500 | |
| 27 February 1993 | Dundee | H | 1–0 | 12,140 | Ferguson |
| 6 March 1993 | Airdrieonians | A | 3–1 | 2,291 | Ferguson, Connolly, Clark |
| 9 March 1993 | Motherwell | H | 0–0 | 5,134 | |
| 13 March 1993 | Heart of Midlothian | A | 0–1 | 7,067 | |
| 20 March 1993 | St Johnstone | A | 4–1 | 4,510 | O'Neill, McInally, Connolly, O'Neil |
| 27 March 1993 | Celtic | H | 2–3 | 12,185 | Connolly, Ferguson |
| 8 April 1993 | Falkirk | A | 2–1 | 3,599 | Johnson, Connolly |
| 12 April 1993 | Hibernian | H | 0–3 | 5,167 | |
| 17 April 1993 | Airdrieonians | H | 3–0 | 4,200 | Dailly, Bollan, Connolly |
| 20 April 1993 | Dundee | A | 4–0 | 9,589 | Dailly (2), Bollan, Connolly |
| 1 May 1993 | Partick Thistle | H | 3–1 | 5,590 | Connolly (2), O'Neill |
| 8 May 1993 | Rangers | A | 0–1 | 42,917 | |
| 15 May 1993 | Aberdeen | H | 1–4 | 9,078 | Dailly |

=== Scottish Cup ===
| Date | Round | Opponent | Venue | Result | Attendance | Scorers |
|---|---|---|---|---|---|---|
| 9 January 1993 | Third round | Meadowbank Thistle | H | 3–1 | 5,263 | Welsh, McKinlay, Ferguson |
| 7 February 1993 | Fourth round | Aberdeen | A | 0–2 | 14,155 | |

=== Scottish League Cup ===
| Date | Round | Opponent | Venue | Result | Attendance | Scorers |
|---|---|---|---|---|---|---|
| 11 August 1992 | Second round | Queen of the South | H | 6–0 | 4,512 | McKinlay, Connolly (2), Johnson (2), Ferreyra |
| 18 August 1992 | Third round | St Mirren | H | 3–0 | 5,586 | O'Neil, Ferguson (2) |
| 26 August 1992 | Quarter–finals | Rangers | H | 2–3 | 15,716 | Ferreyra, Connolly |

== Player statistics ==
During the 1992–93 season, United used 25 different players comprising five nationalities. The table below shows the number of appearances and goals scored by each player.

| No. | Pos | Nat | Player | Total | | Premier Division | | Scottish Cup | | League Cup | |
| No. | Pos | Nat | Player | Apps | Goals | Apps | Goals | Apps | Goals | Apps | Goals |
|---|---|---|---|---|---|---|---|---|---|---|---|
| | GK | (Scotland) SCO | Alan Main | 48 | 0 | 43 | 0 | 2 | 0 | 3 | 0 |
| | GK | (Netherlands) NED | Guido van de Kamp | 1 | 0 | 1 | 0 | 0 | 0 | 0 | 0 |
| | DF | (Scotland) SCO | Gary Bollan | 16 | 3 | 15 | 3 | 1 | 0 | 0 | 0 |
| | DF | (Scotland) SCO | John Clark | 41 | 2 | 37 | 2 | 1 | 0 | 3 | 0 |
| | DF | (Scotland) SCO | Alex Cleland | 28 | 0 | 24 | 0 | 1 | 0 | 3 | 0 |
| | DF | (Netherlands) NED | Fred van der Hoorn | 36 | 0 | 32 | 0 | 1 | 0 | 3 | 0 |
| | DF | (Federal Republic of Yugoslavia) YUG | Miodrag Krivokapić | 9 | 0 | 8 | 0 | 0 | 0 | 1 | 0 |
| | DF | (Scotland) SCO | Maurice Malpas | 42 | 0 | 37 | 0 | 2 | 0 | 3 | 0 |
| | DF | (Scotland) SCO | Dave Narey | 31 | 0 | 28 | 0 | 1 | 0 | 2 | 0 |
| | DF | (Scotland) SCO | Mark Perry | 20 | 1 | 18 | 1 | 2 | 0 | 0 | 0 |
| | DF | (Scotland) SCO | Brian Welsh | 17 | 2 | 15 | 1 | 1 | 1 | 1 | 0 |
| | MF | (Scotland) SCO | Dave Bowman | 25 | 0 | 24 | 0 | 1 | 0 | 0 | 0 |
| | MF | (Scotland) SCO | David Hannah | 5 | 0 | 5 | 0 | 0 | 0 | 0 | 0 |
| | MF | (Scotland) SCO | Grant Johnson | 21 | 3 | 17 | 1 | 1 | 0 | 3 | 2 |
| | MF | (Scotland) SCO | Jim McInally | 37 | 5 | 33 | 5 | 1 | 0 | 3 | 0 |
| | MF | (Scotland) SCO | Billy McKinlay | 39 | 3 | 36 | 1 | 2 | 1 | 1 | 1 |
| | MF | (Scotland) SCO | Andy McLaren | 6 | 0 | 5 | 0 | 1 | 0 | 0 | 0 |
| | MF | (Scotland) SCO | John O'Neil | 32 | 4 | 28 | 3 | 1 | 0 | 3 | 1 |
| | MF | (Northern Ireland) NIR | Michael O'Neill | 25 | 2 | 25 | 2 | 0 | 0 | 0 | 0 |
| | MF | (Scotland) SCO | Allan Preston | 2 | 0 | 0 | 0 | 0 | 0 | 2 | 0 |
| | FW | (Scotland) SCO | Paddy Connolly | 47 | 19 | 42 | 16 | 2 | 0 | 3 | 3 |
| | FW | (Scotland) SCO | Scott Crabbe | 29 | 4 | 27 | 4 | 2 | 0 | 0 | 0 |
| | FW | (Scotland) SCO | Christian Dailly | 15 | 4 | 14 | 4 | 1 | 0 | 0 | 0 |
| | FW | (Scotland) SCO | Duncan Ferguson | 33 | 15 | 30 | 12 | 1 | 1 | 2 | 2 |
| | FW | (Argentina) ARG | Victor Ferreyra | 10 | 2 | 7 | 0 | 0 | 0 | 3 | 2 |

=== Goalscorers ===
United had 14 players score with the team scoring 70 goals in total. The top goalscorer was Paddy Connolly, who finished the season with 19 goals.

| Name | League | Cups | Total |
|---|---|---|---|
| Paddy Connolly | 16 | 3 | 19 |
| Duncan Ferguson | 12 | 3 | 15 |
| Jim McInally | 5 | 0 | 5 |
| Scott Crabbe | 4 | 0 | 4 |
| Christian Dailly | 4 | 0 | 4 |
| John O'Neil | 3 | 1 | 4 |
| Gary Bollan | 3 | 0 | 3 |
| Grant Johnson | 1 | 2 | 3 |
| Billy McKinlay | 1 | 2 | 3 |
| John Clark | 2 | 0 | 2 |
| Michael O'Neill | 2 | 0 | 2 |
| Brian Welsh | 1 | 1 | 2 |
| Victor Ferreyra | 0 | 2 | 2 |
| Mark Perry | 1 | 0 | 1 |
| Own goals | 1 | 0 | 1 |

=== Discipline ===
During the 1992–93 season, three United players were sent off. Statistics for cautions are unavailable.

| Name | Dismissals |
|---|---|
| Gary Bollan | (red card) 1 |
| Duncan Ferguson | (red card) 1 |
| Jim McInally | (red card) 1 |

== Competitions ==
=== League table ===
| Pos | Team | Pld | W | D | L | GF | GA | GD | Pts | Qualification or relegation |
|---|---|---|---|---|---|---|---|---|---|---|
| 2 | Aberdeen | 44 | 27 | 10 | 7 | 87 | 36 | +51 | 64 | Qualification for the Cup Winners' Cup first round |
| 3 | Celtic | 44 | 24 | 12 | 8 | 68 | 41 | +27 | 60 | Qualification for the UEFA Cup first round |
| 4 | Dundee United | 44 | 19 | 9 | 16 | 56 | 49 | +7 | 47 | Qualification for the UEFA Cup first round |
| 5 | Heart of Midlothian | 44 | 15 | 14 | 15 | 46 | 51 | −5 | 44 | Qualification for the UEFA Cup first round |
| 6 | St Johnstone | 44 | 10 | 20 | 14 | 52 | 66 | −14 | 40 | |

Source: RSSSF
Rules for classification: 1) points; 2) goal difference; 3) number of goals scored.

== Transfers ==
=== In ===
| Date | Player | From | Fee |
|---|---|---|---|
| 3 October | (Scotland) Scott Crabbe | (Scotland) Heart of Midlothian | Swap |

=== Out ===
| Date | Player | To | Fee |
|---|---|---|---|
| 1 July | (Scotland) Scott Y. Thomson | (Scotland) Forfar Athletic | Unknown |
| 14 July | (Scotland) Darren Jackson | (Scotland) Hibernian | £400,000 |
| 1 August | (Scotland) Ray McKinnon | (England) Nottingham Forest | £750,000 |
| 3 October | (Scotland) Allan Preston | (Scotland) Heart of Midlothian | Swap |
| 27 February | (Argentina) Victor Ferreyra | (Japan) Mitsubishi Mizushima | £175,000 |

== See also ==
- 1992–93 in Scottish football
