= 1990–91 Dundee United F.C. season =

Dundee United
1990–91 season
- Chairman: Jim McLean
- Manager: Jim McLean
- Stadium: Tannadice Park
- Premier Division: Fourth place
- Scottish Cup: Runners-up
- League Cup: Semi-finals
- Top goalscorer: League: Darren Jackson (12); All: Darren Jackson (18)
- Highest home attendance: 17,564 vs. Rangers, Premier Division, 29 December 1990
- Lowest home attendance: 5,475 vs. FH, UEFA Cup, 3 October 1990
Home colours	Away colours

The 1990–91 season was the 82nd year of football played by Dundee United, and covers the period from 1 July 1990 to 30 June 1991. United finished in fourth place and missed out on European football for the first time in fifteen years.

== Summary ==
Dundee United played a total of 50 competitive matches during the 1990–91 season. The team finished fourth in the Scottish Premier Division.

In the cup competitions, United lost in the final of the Scottish Cup to Motherwell and lost in the Scottish League Cup semi-finals to eventual runners-up Celtic.

The club signed five players during the season with a total public cost of nearly £400,000. In addition, one player played whilst on trial but left shortly afterwards. Two players were sold by the club during the season.

The jerseys were sponsored by Belhaven Brewery for the fourth season.

== Results and fixtures ==
Win	Draw	Loss

All results are written with Dundee United's score first.

=== Scottish Premier Division ===
Date	Opponent	Venue	Result	Attendance	Scorers
25 August 1990	St Johnstone	A	3–1	7,784	Jackson (2), Dailly
1 September 1990	Motherwell	H	1–0	7,636	Cleland
8 September 1990	St Mirren	H	1–0	6,968	Jackson
15 September 1990	Aberdeen	A	1–1	17,400	McKinnon
22 September 1990	Rangers	H	2–1	16,270	McKinlay, Butcher (o.g.)
29 September 1990	Heart of Midlothian	A	0–1	12,052	
10 October 1990	Dunfermline Athletic	H	3–0	9,025	Bowman, Steinmann, French
13 October 1990	Hibernian	H	1–0	10,289	Miller (o.g.)
20 October 1990	Celtic	A	0–0	34,363	
27 October 1990	St Johnstone	H	1–2	11,353	Jackson
3 November 1990	Motherwell	A	2–0	8,117	Jackson, Dailly
10 November 1990	Rangers	A	2–1	36,995	Jackson (2)
17 November 1990	Heart of Midlothian	H	1–1	10,821	Jackson
24 November 1990	Aberdeen	H	2–3	12,344	McKimmie (o.g.), Malpas
1 December 1990	St Mirren	A	1–1	4,581	Jackson
8 December 1990	Celtic	H	3–1	14,895	Dailly, Jackson, Paatelainen
15 December 1990	Hibernian	A	0–0	6,000	
22 December 1990	Dunfermline Athletic	A	0–1	8,018	
29 December 1990	Rangers	H	1–2	17,564	Jackson
2 January 1991	Aberdeen	A	1–0	17,400	Dailly
5 January 1991	St Mirren	H	3–2	11,353	Clark, Dailly, Cleland
19 January 1991	Motherwell	H	3–0	6,482	McKinlay, Connolly (2)
2 February 1991	Celtic	A	0–1	26,172	
9 February 1991	Hibernian	H	0–0	6,114	
16 February 1991	Heart of Midlothian	A	1–2	7,216	Clark
19 February 1991	St Johnstone	A	1–0	6,910	French
2 March 1991	Dunfermline Athletic	H	1–0	6,379	Ferguson
9 March 1991	St Mirren	A	1–0	3,960	Jackson
23 March 1991	Aberdeen	H	1–2	10,643	McInally
30 March 1991	St Johnstone	H	0–0	7,794	Jackson
13 April 1991	Celtic	H	2–1	12,603	Van der Hoorn, McKinnon
16 April 1991	Motherwell	A	0–1	3,531	
20 April 1991	Hibernian	A	0–1	4,000	
24 April 1991	Rangers	A	0–1	32,397	
4 May 1991	Heart of Midlothian	H	2–1	6,820	French (2)
11 May 1991	Dunfermline Athletic	A	0–1	4,894	

United were leading Dunfermline 2–1 on 6 October when the match was abandoned due to heavy rain. The match was replayed four days later.

=== Scottish Cup ===
Date	Round	Opponent	Venue	Result	Attendance	Scorers
26 January 1990	Third round	East Fife	A	1–1	4,947	Connolly
29 January 1990	Third round replay	East Fife	H	2–1	7,190	Clark, Ferguson
23 February 1990	Fourth round	Airdrieonians	H	2–0	8,648	French (2)
13 March 1990	Quarter–finals	Dundee	H	3–1	16,228	McKinnon, Jackson, Ferguson
6 April 1991	Semi–finals	St Johnstone	N	2-1	16,560	Clark, Ferguson
18 May 1991	Final	Motherwell	N	3–4	57,319	Bowman, J O'Neil, Jackson

=== Scottish League Cup ===
Date	Round	Opponent	Venue	Result	Attendance	Scorers
21 August 1990	Second round	Alloa Athletic	A	3–0	1,835	Welsh, Dailly, Jackson
28 August 1990	Third round	Partick Thistle	A	3–1	4,000	Van der Hoorn, Dailly, Jackson
4 September 1990	Quarter–finals	Motherwell	H	2–0	8,475	Jackson, McInally
25 September 1990	Semi–finals	Celtic	N	0–2	49,975	

=== UEFA Cup ===
Date	Round	Opponent	Venue	Result	Attendance	Scorers
18 September 1990	First round 1st leg	(Iceland) FH	A	3–1	263	Jackson, Cleland (2)
3 October 1990	First round 2nd leg	(Iceland) FH	H	2–2	5,475	Connolly, Hjalmarson (o.g.)
24 October 1990	Second round 1st leg	(Netherlands) Vitesse	A	0–1	8,331	
7 November 1990	First round 2nd leg	(Netherlands) Vitesse	H	0–4	10,726	

== Player statistics ==
During the 1990–91 season, United used 25 different players comprising five nationalities. Maurice Malpas was the only player to play in every match. The table below shows the number of appearances and goals scored by each player.

No.	Pos	Nat	Player	Total		Premier Division		Scottish Cup		League Cup		UEFA Cup	
No.	Pos	Nat	Player	Apps	Goals	Apps	Goals	Apps	Goals	Apps	Goals	Apps	Goals
	GK	(Scotland) SCO	Alan Main	40	0	31	0	6	0	1	0	2	0
	GK	(Scotland) SCO	Billy Thomson	10	0	5	0	0	0	3	0	2	0
	DF	(Scotland) SCO	Gary Bollan	2	0	2	0	0	0	0	0	0	0
	DF	(Scotland) SCO	John Clark	25	4	18	2	6	2	0	0	1	0
	DF	(Scotland) SCO	Alex Cleland	29	4	21	2	0	0	4	0	4	2
	DF	(Netherlands) NED	Fred van der Hoorn	45	2	32	1	6	0	4	1	3	0
	DF	(Scotland) SCO	Scott Kopel	1	0	0	0	0	0	0	0	1	0
	DF	(Socialist Federal Republic of Yugoslavia) YUG	Miodrag Krivokapić	34	0	24	0	6	0	3	0	1	0
	DF	(Scotland) SCO	Maurice Malpas	50	1	36	1	6	0	4	0	4	0
	DF	(Scotland) SCO	Dave Narey	6	0	4	0	0	0	0	0	2	0
	DF	(Netherlands) NED	Gijs Steinmann	14	1	14	1	0	0	0	0	0	0
	DF	(Scotland) SCO	Brian Welsh	26	1	17	0	2	0	4	1	3	0
	MF	(Scotland) SCO	Dave Bowman	27	2	20	1	4	1	1	0	2	0
	MF	(Scotland) SCO	Jim McInally	47	2	33	1	6	0	4	1	4	0
	MF	(Scotland) SCO	Billy McKinlay	46	2	33	2	5	0	4	0	4	0
	MF	(Scotland) SCO	Ray McKinnon	24	3	17	2	4	1	2	0	1	0
	MF	(Scotland) SCO	John O'Neil	19	1	15	0	4	1	0	0	0	0
	MF	(Northern Ireland) NIR	Michael O'Neill	17	0	12	0	2	0	2	0	1	0
	MF	(Scotland) SCO	Allan Preston	7	0	3	0	0	0	2	0	2	0
	FW	(Scotland) SCO	Paddy Connolly	16	4	10	2	2	1	1	0	3	1
	FW	(Scotland) SCO	Christian Dailly	26	7	18	5	2	0	4	2	2	0
	FW	(Scotland) SCO	Duncan Ferguson	14	4	9	1	5	3	0	0	0	0
	FW	(Scotland) SCO	Hamish French	24	6	19	4	3	2	0	0	2	0
	FW	(Scotland) SCO	Darren Jackson	46	18	33	12	6	2	4	3	3	1
	FW	(Finland) FIN	Mixu Paatelainen	26	1	21	1	0	0	2	0	3	0

=== Goalscorers ===
United had 17 players score with the team scoring 67 goals in total. The top goalscorer was Darren Jackson, who finished the season with 18 goals.

Name	League	Cups	Total
Darren Jackson	12	6	18
Christian Dailly	5	2	7
Hamish French	4	2	6
Own goals	3	2	5
John Clark	2	2	4
Alex Cleland	2	2	4
Paddy Connolly	2	2	4
Duncan Ferguson	1	3	4
Ray McKinnon	2	1	3
Billy McKinlay	2	0	2
Dave Bowman	1	1	2
Fred van der Hoorn	1	1	2
Jim McInally	1	1	2
Maurice Malpas	1	0	1
Mixu Paatelainen	1	0	1
Gijs Steinmann	1	0	1
John O'Neil	0	1	1
Brian Welsh	0	1	1

=== Discipline ===
During the 1990–91 season, two United players were sent off. Statistics for cautions are unavailable.

Name	Dismissals
Fred van der Hoorn	(red card) 1
Alan Main	(red card) 1

== Competitions ==
=== League table ===
Pos	Team	Pld	W	D	L	GF	GA	GD	Pts	Qualification or relegation
2	Aberdeen	36	22	9	5	62	27	+35	53	Qualification for the UEFA Cup first round
3	Celtic	36	17	7	12	52	38	+14	41	Qualification for the UEFA Cup first round
4	Dundee United	36	17	7	12	41	29	+12	41	
5	Heart of Midlothian	36	14	7	15	48	55	−7	35	
6	Motherwell	36	12	9	15	51	50	+1	33	Qualification for the Cup Winners' Cup first round

Source: Statto.com
Rules for classification: 1) points; 2) goal difference; 3) number of goals scored.

== Transfers ==
=== In ===
Date	Player	From	Fee
October 1990	(Netherlands) Gijs Steinmann	(Netherlands) Utrecht	£100,000

=== Out ===
Date	Player	To	Fee
23 August 1990	(Barbados) Peter Hinds	(Portugal) Marítimo	Free
May 1991	(Netherlands) Gijs Steinmann	(Netherlands) Utrecht	Free

== See also ==
- 1990–91 in Scottish football
