= Pochettino =

Pochettino is an Italian surname. Notable people with the surname include:

- José Luis Pochettino (born 1965), Argentine footballer
- Mauricio Pochettino (born 1972), Argentine football player and manager
- Maurizio Pochettino (born 2001), Argentine footballer
- Tomás Pochettino (born 1996), Argentine footballer
