= Gary Bollan =

Scottish footballer (born 1973)

Personal information
- Full name: Gary Bollan
- Date of birth: 24 March 1973 (age 53)
- Place of birth: Dundee, Scotland
- Position: Defender

Youth career
- 1988–1989: Fairmuir Boys Club

Senior career*
Years	Team	Apps	(Gls)
1989–1995	Dundee United	46	(4)
1995–1998	Rangers	11	(0)
1997	→ Wolverhampton Wanderers (loan)	0	(0)
1998–2001	St Johnstone	96	(7)
2001–2003	Livingston	43	(1)
2003–2004	Dundee United	15	(0)
2004	Motherwell	3	(0)
2004–2005	Clyde	25	(2)
2005–2006	Brechin City	18	(0)
2006	Albion Rovers	2	(0)
2006–2008	Carnoustie Panmure		
Total		259	(14)

International career
1992–1995	Scotland under-21	17	(1)

Managerial career
- 2008: Clyde (caretaker)
- 2009–2012: Livingston
- 2013–2015: Airdrieonians
- 2015–2017: Forfar Athletic
- 2017–2021: Cowdenbeath
- * Club domestic league appearances and goals

Gary Bollan (born 24 March 1973) is a Scottish former professional football player and manager who was most recently the assistant coach at Scottish League One club Inverness Caledonian Thistle.

He played for Dundee United (two spells), Rangers, Wolverhampton Wanderers (loan), St Johnstone, Livingston, Motherwell, Clyde, Brechin City and Carnoustie Panmure. He also played for the Scotland national under-21 football team.

He started his managerial career as caretaker of Clyde before managing former club Livingston, Airdrieonians, Forfar Athletic and Cowdenbeath.

== Playing career ==
Bollan came up through the youth system and into the first team at Dundee United as a teenager in the early 1990s. He sparked interest from Rangers, who signed him in January 1995. Bollan spent three years at Ibrox but made only a handful of appearances due to injury. He was transferred to St Johnstone in 1998 and spent three years there.

A move to Heart of Midlothian stalled in March 2001 due to a failed medical before Bollan moved to First Division champions Livingston four months later. His appearance for Livingston in the UEFA Cup meant that he had made appearances for four different Scottish clubs in European competition. He returned to Dundee United in February 2003 for a year, before having a brief spell with Motherwell in 2004. In August 2004, Bollan began the first of two spells with Clyde, joining as a player/coach.

He spent the 2004–05 season as a player-coach for Clyde. He made his debut on the opening day of the season, in Clyde's derby win over rivals Partick Thistle. He is best known for his time at Broadwood Stadium, when he scored a free-kick from 40 yards to knock Falkirk out of the Scottish Cup. He was voted Clyde man of the match in their encounter with Celtic in the latter stages of the competition. He was briefly caretaker manager at the end of the season. Bollan signed for Brechin in July 2005 but was made available for transfer shortly afterwards. In November 2006, Gary Bollan signed for Carnoustie Panmure.

== Coaching career ==
=== Early career ===
In July 2007, Bollan was appointed as Head of Youth Development at Clyde, though he has appeared in the dugout in a coaching role since January 2008, and was in joint-caretaker charge of the team alongside Dougie Bell for two matches after the resignation of Colin Hendry. In April 2009, following reported financial troubles at Clyde, Bollan left the club.

=== Livingston ===
On 14 August 2009, Bollan became the new manager of his former club, Livingston. In October 2009, Bollan won SFL manager of the month following three victories and a draw in the league and a 3–1 victory over Queen's Park in the Scottish Cup 2nd Round. He followed this up by winning it again the following month, winning three out of three in the league. Bollan then won Third Division Manager of the Year, after leading his team to promotion by a margin of 15 points. Livingston won promotion from the Second Division, but Bollan was sacked by Livingston in February 2012. The club cited his alleged failure to develop young players as their reason for his dismissal.

=== Airdrieonians ===
In October 2013, Bollan was appointed manager of Scottish League One club Airdrieonians. The club were bottom of League One when he took over, but after a while getting settled and strengthening the squad, a strong finish to the season saw them avoid relegation. A fine run of form, in which they lost just one game (away to Rangers) in their last 16 fixtures saw them finish in sixth place, having secured their League One status with two games to spare. In May 2014 Bollan's contract was extended until May 2016.

=== Forfar Athletic ===
Bollan left his position as manager of Airdrieonians in December 2015 to take over from Dick Campbell at fellow League One side Forfar Athletic. However, he was unable to avoid relegation to Scottish League Two. He guided them back to the third tier via the play-offs in the following season, in which the club led for most of the season before missing out on the final day to Arbroath. Bollan was sacked by Forfar in September 2017, after a run of defeats culminated in a 5–0 defeat at Arbroath.

=== Cowdenbeath ===
After less than two months without a club, Bollan was appointed manager of Scottish League Two side Cowdenbeath on 14 November 2017. He took over a struggling club, fighting for existence and relegation from the Scottish Professional Football League. Despite some decent results, the "Blue Brazil" still finished bottom at the end of the season. Bollan led the club to safety after beating Highland Football League champions Cove Rangers in the Scottish League Two play-offs in May 2018.

Bollan left Cowdenbeath in October 2021, after the club lost a Scottish Cup tie against Lowland League side Civil Service Strollers.

=== Inverness Caledonian Thistle ===
Bollan joined Duncan Ferguson at Inverness Caledonian Thistle as a coach in October 2023.

He left the club along with Ferguson and goalkeeping coach Stuart Garden on 23 October 2024 after the club entered administration.

== Career statistics ==
=== Player ===
Club performance			League		Cup		League Cup		Continental		Total	
Season	Club	League	Apps	Goals	Apps	Goals	Apps	Goals	Apps	Goals	Apps	Goals
Scotland			League		Scottish Cup		League Cup		Europe		Total	
1990–91	Dundee United	Scottish Premier Division	2	0	-		-		-		2	0
1991–92	Dundee United	Scottish Premier Division	10	1	1	0	2	0	-		13	1
1992–93	Dundee United	Scottish Premier Division	15	3	1	0	-		-		16	3
1993–94	Dundee United	Scottish Premier Division	12	0	1	0	4	0	1	0	18	0
1994–95	Dundee United	Scottish Premier Division	7	0	-		1	0	-		8	0
1994–95	Rangers	Scottish Premier Division	6	0	N/A		-		N/A		6	0
1995–96	Rangers	Scottish Premier Division	4	0	N/A		-		N/A		6	0
1996–97	Rangers	Scottish Premier Division	0	0	N/A		-		N/A		6	0
1997–98	Rangers	Scottish Premier Division	1	0	N/A		-		N/A		6	0
1997–98	St Johnstone	Scottish Premier Division	-		N/A		N/A		N/A		0	0
1998–99	St Johnstone	Scottish Premier League	33	4	N/A		N/A		N/A		33	4
1999–00	St Johnstone	Scottish Premier League	34	2	N/A		N/A		N/A		34	2
2000–01	St Johnstone	Scottish Premier League	28	1	N/A		N/A		N/A		28	1
2001–02	Livingston	Scottish Premier League	21	0	2	0	2	0	-		25	0
2002–03	Livingston	Scottish Premier League	22	1	1	1	2	0	3	0	28	2
2002–03	Dundee United	Scottish Premier League	13	0	-		-		-		13	0
2003–04	Dundee United	Scottish Premier League	2	0	-		-		-		2	0
2003–04	Motherwell	Scottish Premier League	3	0	1	0	-		-		4	0
2004–05	Clyde	Scottish First Division	25	2	4	1	1	0	-		30	3
2005–06	Brechin City	Scottish First Division	18	0	-		-		-		18	0
Career total			252	14	11	2	12	0	4	0	279	16

=== Managerial record ===
As of match played 23 October 2021

Managerial record by team and tenure
Team	Nat	From	To	Record				
Team	Nat	From	To	G	W	D	L	Win %
Livingston	(Scotland)	14 August 2009	5 February 2012	108	62	22	24	57.41
Airdrieonians	(Scotland)	25 October 2013	21 December 2015	87	35	21	31	40.23
Forfar Athletic	(Scotland)	21 December 2015	18 September 2017	80	29	19	32	36.25
Cowdenbeath	(Scotland)	14 November 2017	23 October 2021	149	43	32	74	28.86
Total				424	169	94	161	39.86

== Honours and achievements ==
=== Player ===
Dundee United

- Scottish Cup: 1993–94

=== Manager ===
Livingston

- Scottish Third Division: 2009–10
- Scottish Second Division: 2010–11

Forfar Athletic

- Scottish League One play-offs: 2016–17

Cowdenbeath

- Scottish League Two play-offs: 2017–18

== See also ==
- 1990–91 Dundee United F.C. season; 1991–92; 1992–93; 1993–94; 1994–95; 2002–03; 2003–04
- 2004–05 Clyde F.C. season
