= Grant Johnson (footballer) =

Scottish footballer and coach

Personal information
- Full name: Ian Grant Johnson
- Date of birth: 24 March 1972 (age 54)
- Place of birth: Dundee, Scotland
- Position: Midfielder

Team information
- Current team: Brechin City (director)

Senior career*
Years	Team	Apps	(Gls)
1990–1997	Dundee United	86	(7)
1997–2000	Huddersfield Town	65	(5)
2000	Clydebank	4	(0)
2000–2001	Alloa Athletic	24	(1)
2001–2003	Montrose	52	(4)
2003–2007	Brechin City	83	(4)

International career
1992–1993	Scotland U21	6	(0)
- * Club domestic league appearances and goals

Ian Grant Johnson (born 24 March 1972) is a Scottish former footballer who played as a midfielder. He is currently on the board of directors of Scottish Highland Football League club Brechin City. Johnson began his playing career with Dundee United before moving to Huddersfield Town in England. Returning to Scotland, he played for Clydebank, Alloa Athletic and Montrose before ending his career at Brechin City. Johnson is a Scotland under-21 internationalist, having made six appearances between 1992 and 1993.

== Playing career ==
=== Club ===
Johnson played for Dundee United until his mid-twenties, making over eighty appearances for The Terrors. He played eight games for United in 1996–97, which would be his final full season at Tannadice. In November 1997, he signed for Huddersfield Town, where he would spend the next three seasons. In August 2000, he had a month with Clydebank, then moved to Alloa Athletic for the remainder of the 2000–01 season. Two seasons at Montrose followed, before his move to Brechin City in 2003. He retired after leaving the club in August 2007.

=== International ===
Johnson represented the Scotland national under-21 football team.

== Coaching career ==
Johnson returned to Brechin City in a coaching role in 2008, going on to work under managers including his former Dundee United teammates Michael O'Neill and Ray McKinnon. When McKinnon subsequently moved on to manage Raith Rovers in June 2015, Johnson went with him. In May 2016, they returned to Dundee United. Johnson's coaching work is part-time, as he is employed as a solicitor.

== Outside football ==
During his playing career Johnson completed a law degree at the University of Dundee. He joined Thorntons, a Dundee solicitors, in 2003 and was made a partner in the firm in 2013.

== Honours ==
=== Club ===
Brechin City

- Scottish Second Division: 2004–05

== Career statistics ==
Club performance			League		Cup		League Cup		Continental		Total	
Season	Club	League	Apps	Goals	Apps	Goals	Apps	Goals	Apps	Goals	Apps	Goals
Scotland			League		Scottish Cup		League Cup		Europe		Total	
1991–92	Dundee United	Scottish Premier Division	10	1	-		-		-		10	1
1992–93	Dundee United	Scottish Premier Division	17	1	1	0	3	2	-		21	3
1993–94	Dundee United	Scottish Premier Division	9	0	-		1	0	1	0	11	0
1994–95	Dundee United	Scottish Premier Division	13	1	-		-		-		13	1
1995–96	Dundee United	Scottish First Division	30	4	3	0	-		-		33	4
1996–97	Dundee United	Scottish Premier Division	8	0	-		1	0	-		9	0
England			League		FA Cup		League Cup		Europe		Total	
1997–98	Huddersfield Town	Football League First Division	28	1	2	0	-		-		30	1
1998–99	Huddersfield Town	Football League First Division	36	4	5	0	4	1	-		45	5
1999–2000	Huddersfield Town	Football League First Division	-		-		-		-		0	0
Scotland			League		Scottish Cup		League Cup		Europe		Total	
2000–01	Clydebank	Scottish Second Division	4	0	-		1	0	-		5	0
2000–01	Alloa Athletic	Scottish First Division	24	1	-		-		-		24	1
2001–02	Montrose	Scottish Third Division	31	2	2	0	1	0	-		34	2
2002–03	Montrose	Scottish Third Division	30	4	2	1	1	0	-		33	5
2003–04	Brechin City	Scottish First Division	25	0	1	0	1	0	-		27	0
2004–05	Brechin City	Scottish Second Division	24	0	3	0	2	0	-		29	0
2005–06	Brechin City	Scottish First Division	23	3	1	0	-		-		24	3
2006–07	Brechin City	Scottish Second Division	12	1	-		2	0	-		12	3
