= Drew Rutherford =

Scottish footballer

Personal information
- Date of birth: 4 October 1953
- Place of birth: Edinburgh, Scotland
- Date of death: 14 December 2005 (aged 52)
- Place of death: Scotland
- Position: Defender

Senior career*
Years	Team	Apps	(Gls)
1973–1977	East Fife	86	(15)
1977–1985	St Johnstone	300	(18)
1985–1987	Cowdenbeath	34	(0)
- * Club domestic league appearances and goals

Drew Rutherford (4 October 1953 – 14 December 2005) was a professional footballer who played most of his career for St Johnstone F.C.

Although Edinburgh-born, Rutherford lived most of his life in Fife and started his professional career at East Fife. After four years with the Methil club, he signed for St Johnstone which was where he remained for most of his playing days.

Playing in the centre of defence for St Johnstone over a span of nine seasons, he set a record for most appearances. This record stood until 2009, when it was surpassed by goalkeeper Alan Main. Rutherford was also club captain and a popular player with the club's supporters. His time at Perth began in February 1977 and he made a total of 342 appearances (plus five as a substitute) before leaving the club in May 1985. Despite being a defender, he managed 18 goals for St Johnstone.

After leaving St Johnstone he had a short spell with another Fife club, Cowdenbeath, before retiring from the game.

Rutherford was held in such high regard by St Johnstone fans that, despite twenty years having passed since his time at the club, a benefit night was organised to raise funds after hearing of his illness. Although Rutherford himself was too ill to attend, his family was represented along with many of his former teammates.

Rutherford died in 2005 from cancer.
