= Guido van de Kamp =

Dutch footballer (born 1964)

Personal information
- Full name: Guido van de Kamp
- Date of birth: 8 February 1964 (age 62)
- Place of birth: Den Bosch, Netherlands
- Height: 6 ft 3 in (1.91 m)
- Position: Goalkeeper

Team information
- Current team: RKVV Sint-Michielsgestel (Gk coach)

Senior career*
Years	Team	Apps	(Gls)
1984–91	Den Bosch		
1991	→ NEC Nijmegen	3	(0)
1991–95	Dundee United	53	(0)
1995–97	Dunfermline Athletic	39	(0)
1997	→ Glentoran (loan)		
1997–2001	Raith Rovers	125	(0)
2001	Alloa	13	(0)
- * Club domestic league appearances and goals

Guido van de Kamp (born 8 February 1964 in Den Bosch) is a Dutch former footballer who played as a goalkeeper and is currently Facilities Manager for his hometown club F. C. Den Bosch. He has also been the goalkeeping coach at the same club since 2001.

== Career ==
Van de Kamp started his career with Dutch side Den Bosch. He was regarded to have failed to establish himself as a starter while playing for the club. In 1991, he signed for Scottish side Dundee United as a replacement for Billy Thomson, and battled with Alan Main for the No.1 jersey for the first couple of seasons. Van de Kamp was in goal for most of the 1991-92 season, playing in 30 out of the 49 matches, but was in goal for only one game the following season - a 3-0 defeat at home to Hibernian. Van de Kamp took over again halfway through the 1993-94 season, just as United's successful Scottish Cup run began, playing in the Final. This was his last game for United and after a contract dispute with the club he returned home, but came back to Scotland and played for Dunfermline, Raith and Alloa, winning a Scottish First Division championship medal with Dunfermline. He also spent a brief spell on loan with Glentoran towards the end of the 1996-97 season but rejected a permanent deal with them after indicating his intention to retire. However, he ultimately signed for Raith after being contacted by Jimmy Nicholl. Van de Kamp remains hugely popular with Glentoran supporters, despite lasting less than a month with the club.

Van de Kamp was one of four ex-Dundee United players inducted into the club's Hall of Fame in 2017.

== Personal life ==
Van de Kamp was born on 8 February 1964 in Den Bosch, Netherlands. He has a daughter.

== Honours ==
=== Dundee United ===
- Scottish Cup: 1

1993-94

=== Dunfermline Athletic ===
- Scottish First Division: 1

1995–96
