= Alec Cleland =

Scottish footballer & coach (born 1970)

Personal information
- Full name: Alexander Cleland
- Date of birth: 10 December 1970 (age 55)
- Place of birth: Glasgow, Scotland
- Position: Defender

Team information
- Current team: Dundee United (Head of Academy coaching)

Senior career*
Years	Team	Apps	(Gls)
1987–1995	Dundee United	151	(8)
1995–1998	Rangers	96	(4)
1998–2002	Everton	35	(0)
Total		282	(12)

International career
1989–1992	Scotland U21	11	(0)
1998	Scotland B	1	(1)

Managerial career
- 2004: Livingston (caretaker)
- 2007: Livingston (joint caretaker)
- 2011: St Johnstone (caretaker)
- 2020: St Johnstone (caretaker)
- 2023: St Johnstone (caretaker)
- * Club domestic league appearances and goals

Alexander Cleland (born 10 December 1970) is a Scottish professional football coach and former player who is a coach at Dundee United.

Cleland played as a defender for Scottish sides Dundee United and Rangers and English team Everton. Although never capped at senior level for Scotland, he did make eleven appearances for the under-21 team. After retiring from football, he moved into coaching. Cleland has had multiple spells as a caretaker manager at both Livingston and St Johnstone.

== Playing career ==
Cleland started his career with Dundee United, signing as a youth player in 1986. He soon established himself in the reserve team and made his first team debut against Morton in April 1988. By 1990 he was a first team regular, but then broke a leg twice within a few months. After recovering, he was part of the Dundee United team that won the Scottish Cup in 1994. He signed for Rangers in a joint transfer with Gary Bollan in 1995 and established himself in the right-back position at Ibrox. After over 100 appearances for the Glasgow club, he joined Premier League side Everton along with manager Walter Smith in 1998; however, his time in England was blighted with constant injury problems, and he only made 44 appearances before retiring in 2002.

== Coaching career ==
Cleland was assistant manager to Steve Morrison at East Stirlingshire before joining Partick Thistle in January 2004. On 21 June 2004, Cleland was appointed as youth coach at Livingston, taking over from Paul Hegarty who left to join Dunfermline Athletic.

Whilst at Livi he served as caretaker-manager role on two occasions, firstly after the dismissal of Allan Preston in November 2004. Cleland led the side to a 3–1 win away to Kilmarnock on 27 November, ended a seven-game losing run. Then following the sacking of John Robertson in April 2007 which ultimately led to him leaving the club a month later when he failed to become permanent manager.

After leaving Livingston, Cleland coached part-time at Rangers in their Academy before being appointed youth coach at Inverness Caledonian Thistle in January 2008. Following their relegation, Cleland was released as a coach by Inverness Caledonian Thistle to cut costs but shortly afterwards took up a similar position at St Johnstone. He served as their caretaker manager in October 2011, after Derek McInnes and Tony Docherty left for Bristol City. In June 2018, Cleland was promoted to the position of assistant manager at St Johnstone. He was again put in caretaker charge of St Johnstone in May 2020, after the resignation of Tommy Wright, and October 2023, after Steven MacLean was sacked.

== Career statistics ==
Appearances and goals by club, season and competition
Club	Season	League			National cup (Note: Includes Scottish Cup, FA Cup)		League cup (Note: Includes Scottish League Cup, Football League Cup)		Continental		Total	
Club	Season	Division	Apps	Goals	Apps	Goals	Apps	Goals	Apps	Goals	Apps	Goals
Dundee United	1987–88	Scottish Premier Division	1	0	—		—		—		1	0
Dundee United	1988–89	Scottish Premier Division	9	0	—		2	0	1	0	12	0
Dundee United	1989–90	Scottish Premier Division	15	0	—		—		2	1	17	1
Dundee United	1990–91	Scottish Premier Division	20	2	—		4	0	4	1	28	3
Dundee United	1991–92	Scottish Premier Division	32	4	1	0	1	0	—		34	4
Dundee United	1992–93	Scottish Premier Division	24	0	1	0	3	0	—		28	0
Dundee United	1993–94	Scottish Premier Division	31	1	7	0	2	0	1	0	41	1
Dundee United	1994–95	Scottish Premier Division	18	1	—		2	0	1	0	21	1
Dundee United	Total		150	8	9	0	14	0	9	2	182	10
Rangers	1994–95	Scottish Premier Division	10	0	1	0	—		—		11	0
Rangers	1995–96	Scottish Premier Division	25	1	4	3	3	0	4	0	36	4
Rangers	1996–97	Scottish Premier Division	32	0	3	0	4	0	6	0	45	0
Rangers	1997–98	Scottish Premier Division	29	3	6	0	3	0	4	0	42	3
Rangers	Total		96	4	14	3	10	0	14	0	134	7
Everton	1998–99	Premier League	18	0	1	0	3	0	—		22	0
Everton	1999–00	Premier League	9	0	1	0	2	0	—		12	0
Everton	2000–01	Premier League	5	0	—		2	0	—		7	0
Everton	2001–02	Premier League	3	0	—		—		—		3	0
Everton	Total		35	0	2	0	7	0	0	0	44	0
Career total			281	12	25	3	31	0	23	2	360	17

== Honours ==
Dundee United

- Scottish Cup: 1

1993–94

Rangers

- Scottish Premier Division: 3

1994–95, 1995–96, 1996–97

- Scottish Cup: 1

1995–96

- Scottish League Cup: 1

1996–97
