= Paddy Connolly =

Scottish footballer (born 1970)

Personal information
- Date of birth: 25 June 1970 (age 56)
- Place of birth: Glasgow, Scotland
- Position: Striker

Youth career
- Hamilton Thistle

Senior career*
| Years | Team | Apps | (Gls) |
| 1986–1996 | Dundee United | 112 | (29) |
| 1996–1998 | Airdrie | 64 | (19) |
| 1998–2004 | St Johnstone | 109 | (13) |
| 1999 | → Morton (loan) | 5 | (5) |
| 2000 | → Ayr United (loan) | 6 | (2) |
| 2004–2005 | Ayr United | 34 | (7) |
| 2005–2006 | Stirling Albion | 36 | (12) |
| 2006–2008 | Brechin City | 30 | (5) |
| 2008 | Albion Rovers | 0 | (0) |
| Total | | 396 | (92) |

International career
| 1990 | Scotland U21 | 3 | (1) |

Managerial career
- 2015: Alloa Athletic (caretaker)
- 2015: Alloa Athletic (caretaker)
- * Club domestic league appearances and goals

Patrick Connolly (born 25 June 1970) is a Scottish football player and coach. In a twenty-year playing career, he made over 100 appearances for both Dundee United and St Johnstone; he also played for Airdrieonians, Greenock Morton, Ayr United, Stirling Albion and Brechin City. He made three appearances for the Scotland under-21 team in 1990.

After retiring from playing, Connolly was assistant manager of Albion Rovers and Alloa Athletic, and was caretaker manager of Alloa on two occasions in 2015.

== Playing career ==
Connolly was born in Glasgow. He started his career with Dundee United. He spent ten years at Tannadice, after which he joined Airdrie for a short time, before moving to St Johnstone in 1998. Connolly spent six years with the Saints, including short loan spells at Morton and Ayr United. Despite being sent out on loan, Connolly agreed a new three-year contract in May 2001, amidst interest from former manager and Plymouth Argyle manager Paul Sturrock. Connolly missed the final year of his contract due to a cruciate ligament injury, and upon leaving McDiarmid Park in 2004, returned to Ayr, where he spent a season before playing the following season with Stirling Albion. Connolly joined former Dundee United colleague Michael O'Neill at Brechin City in May 2006.

=== Disallowed goal ===
During his time at Dundee United, Connolly was involved in one of Scottish football's more bizarre moments when he was denied a hat-trick in a February 1993 match against Partick Thistle at Firhill after referee Les Mottram failed to notice his shot had entered the goal and come back from the supporting stanchion. Despite Partick defender Martin Clark catching the ball and handing it to goalkeeper Andy Murdoch to restart, Mottram missed both the goal and handball to wave play on. Connolly scored twice in the match in a 4–0 win. Mottram went on to officiate in the 1994 World Cup the following year. The incident resulted in the stanchions from which the ball had rebounded, previously widely used, being removed in a re-design of football goalposts. In 2018, at the same end of the stadium, a similar incident occurred, with Partick Thistle this time being denied a legitimate goal.

== Coaching career ==
Connolly became assistant to brother-in-law Paul Martin at Albion Rovers in July 2008. Nine months later, he left the club due to work commitments elsewhere, joining Fulham as a scout around November 2009.

On 18 May 2011, Connolly was appointed assistant manager to Paul Hartley at Alloa Athletic. He continued as assistant manager under Barry Smith and was appointed caretaker manager after Smith left the club in March 2015. Connolly continued to work for Alloa under the management of Danny Lennon and was appointed caretaker when Lennon resigned in December 2015.

== Personal life ==
Connolly's son Aidan Connolly is a footballer who also played for Dundee United, before joining Raith Rovers in 2016.

== Career statistics ==
Appearances and goals by club, season and competition
| Club | Season | League | | | Scottish Cup | | League Cup | | Europe | | Total | |
| Club | Season | Division | Apps | Goals | Apps | Goals | Apps | Goals | Apps | Goals | Apps | Goals |
|---|---|---|---|---|---|---|---|---|---|---|---|---|
| Dundee United | 1988–89 | Scottish Premier Division | 2 | 0 | – | | – | | – | | 2 | 0 |
| Dundee United | 1989–90 | Scottish Premier Division | 15 | 5 | 4 | 1 | – | | – | | 19 | 6 |
| Dundee United | 1990–91 | Scottish Premier Division | 10 | 2 | 2 | 1 | 1 | 0 | 3 | 1 | 16 | 4 |
| Dundee United | 1991–92 | Scottish Premier Division | 5 | 0 | 1 | 0 | – | | – | | 6 | 0 |
| Dundee United | 1992–93 | Scottish Premier Division | 42 | 16 | 2 | 0 | 3 | 3 | – | | 47 | 19 |
| Dundee United | 1993–94 | Scottish Premier Division | 27 | 5 | 2 | 0 | 2 | 1 | 2 | 0 | 33 | 6 |
| Dundee United | 1994–95 | Scottish Premier Division | 6 | 0 | – | | 2 | 0 | – | | 8 | 0 |
| Dundee United | 1995–96 | Scottish First Division | 5 | 1 | – | | 2 | 2 | – | | 7 | 3 |
| Airdrieonians | 1995–96 | Scottish First Division | 6 | 3 | | | | | – | | 6 | 3 |
| Airdrieonians | 1996–97 | Scottish First Division | 35 | 8 | | | – | | | | 35 | 8 |
| Airdrieonians | 1997–98 | Scottish First Division | 23 | 8 | | | – | | | | 23 | 8 |
| St Johnstone | 1997–98 | Scottish Premier Division | 4 | 0 | – | | – | | – | | 4 | 0 |
| St Johnstone | 1998–99 | Scottish Premier League | 9 | 1 | 1 | 0 | 1 | 1 | – | | 11 | 2 |
| St Johnstone | 1999–2000 | Scottish Premier League | 11 | 1 | – | | – | | – | | 11 | 1 |
| St Johnstone | 2000–01 | Scottish Premier League | 21 | 4 | 1 | 0 | – | | – | | 22 | 4 |
| St Johnstone | 2001–02 | Scottish Premier League | 29 | 2 | 1 | 0 | 2 | 0 | – | | 32 | 2 |
| St Johnstone | 2002–03 | Scottish First Division | 35 | 5 | 3 | 1 | 1 | 0 | – | | 39 | 6 |
| St Johnstone | 2003–04 | Scottish First Division | – | | – | | – | | – | | 0 | 0 |
| Morton (loan) | 1999–2000 | Scottish First Division | 5 | 5 | – | | – | | – | | 5 | 5 |
| Ayr United (loan) | 2001–02 | Scottish First Division | 6 | 2 | – | | – | | – | | 6 | 2 |
| Ayr United | 2004–05 | Scottish Second Division | 34 | 7 | 3 | 0 | 2 | 0 | – | | 39 | 7 |
| Stirling Albion | 2005–06 | Scottish Second Division | 36 | 12 | 2 | 1 | 1 | 2 | – | | 39 | 15 |
| Brechin City | 2006–07 | Scottish Second Division | 30 | 5 | 5 | 1 | 2 | 0 | – | | 37 | 6 |
| Career total | | | 396 | 92 | 27 | 5 | 19 | 9 | 5 | 1 | 447 | 107 |

== Managerial statistics ==
As of 7 April 2015

| Team | Nat | From | To | Record | | | | |
| Team | Nat | From | To | G | W | D | L | Win % |
|---|---|---|---|---|---|---|---|---|
| Alloa Athletic (caretaker) | (Scotland) | March 2015 | April 2015 | 4 | 0 | 2 | 2 | 0.00 |
