= Duncan Ferguson =

Scottish football manager and former player (born 1971)

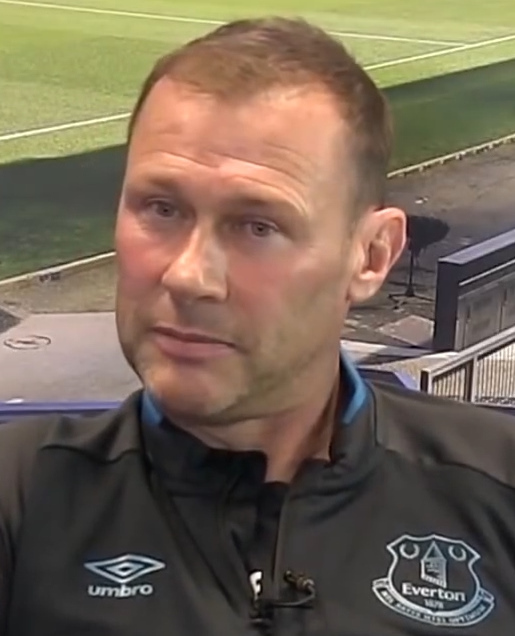
- Ferguson in 2019

Personal information
- Full name: Duncan Cowan Ferguson
- Date of birth: 27 December 1971 (age 54)
- Place of birth: Stirling, Scotland
- Height: 6 ft 4 in (1.93 m)
- Position: Striker

Team information
- Current team: Glentoran (head coach)

Youth career
- 1989–1990: Carse Thistle

Senior career*
| Years | Team | Apps | (Gls) |
| 1990–1993 | Dundee United | 77 | (28) |
| 1993–1994 | Rangers | 14 | (2) |
| 1994 | → Everton (loan) | 9 | (2) |
| 1994–1998 | Everton | 107 | (35) |
| 1998–2000 | Newcastle United | 30 | (8) |
| 2000–2006 | Everton | 123 | (23) |
| Total | | 360 | (98) |

International career
| 1992–1997 | Scotland | 7 | (0) |

Managerial career
- 2019: Everton (interim)
- 2022: Everton (interim)
- 2023: Forest Green Rovers
- 2023–2024: Inverness Caledonian Thistle
- 2026–: Glentoran
- * Club domestic league appearances and goals

Duncan Cowan Ferguson (born 27 December 1971) is a Scottish football manager and former player who is the head coach of NIFL Premiership club Glentoran.

He began his career at Dundee United in 1990, and moved to Rangers in 1993 for a British transfer record fee. He spent the rest of his career in England, moving to Everton in 1994 before a stint with Newcastle United between 1998 and 2000, after which he returned to Everton, where he retired in 2006.

During his career, Ferguson won the FA Cup with Everton in 1995. He was capped for Scotland seven times, playing at UEFA Euro 1992, but made himself unavailable for selection for the national team from 1997 due to a dispute with the Scottish Football Association (SFA). He has scored more goals than any other Scottish player in England's Premier League since its creation in 1992.

Ferguson's aggressive style of play resulted in a career total of nine red cards, as well as a three-month prison sentence following an on-field assault of Raith Rovers' John McStay in 1994. Eight of those red cards were in the English Premier League, where he holds the record for dismissals with Patrick Vieira and Richard Dunne. He is known by the nicknames "Big Dunc" and "Duncan Disorderly".

Ferguson was promoted to the first-team coaching staff at Everton in 2014. Following the dismissal of Everton manager Marco Silva in December 2019, he was named as the team's caretaker manager until Silva's replacement Carlo Ancelotti was appointed manager a few weeks later, at which point Ferguson was made assistant manager. Ferguson left Everton after a second stint as caretaker manager in 2022. After a brief spell as Forest Green Rovers manager, he was appointed manager of Inverness Caledonian Thistle in September 2023 and was sacked when the club went into administration in October 2024.

== Club career ==
=== Dundee United ===
Born in Stirling, Ferguson played for the juvenile side Carse Thistle, initially as a left-back. Dundee United signed him as a schoolboy, and he went on to win the BP Youth Cup in 1990. Later that year, on 10 November, Ferguson made his professional debut for them against Rangers at Ibrox Stadium. His first goal was an extra-time winner against East Fife in the Scottish Cup on 29 January 1991.

The following season saw him become a first-team regular. With 41 appearances and 16 goals, he became the club's top scorer. His good form continued in 1992–93 with 33 appearances and 15 goals. The form he displayed at Dundee United also saw him win a call-up to the Scotland national team.

=== Rangers ===
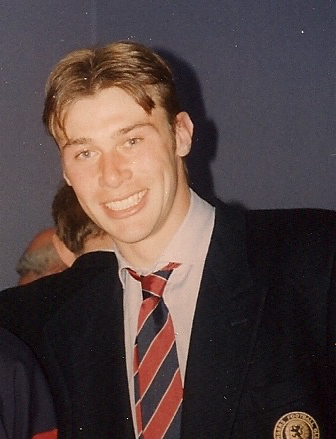
Ferguson in 1994, during his spell at Rangers.

A 22-year-old Ferguson moved to Rangers in 1993 for a transfer fee of £4 million, which set a new British record. During a match with Raith Rovers in April 1994, Ferguson headbutted the visitors' John McStay in the south-west corner of the Ibrox pitch. Referee Kenny Clark did not see the incident, but Ferguson was subsequently charged and found guilty of assault. As it was his third conviction for assault, he received a three-month prison sentence in October 1995. The SFA banned Ferguson for 12 matches before the court case was heard.

Ferguson scored a last-minute winner against Motherwell, from a Brian Laudrup pass, in the first game of the season. Four days later, he scored a hat-trick in a 6–1 win over Arbroath.

Of Ferguson's time at Rangers, one of his strike partners Mark Hateley said: "Duncan was a really good player, but I think he came to Rangers a couple of years too early. Walter Smith wanted me to take him under my wing. He was a boisterous young lad who wanted to play all the time. It was a period in his career where he'd gone from being a big fish in a small pond to being a small fish in the big pond at Rangers. He probably found that a bit difficult." Smith was the assistant manager at Dundee United when he spotted a young Ferguson in Tayside youth football. Smith had moved on to Rangers by the time Ferguson arrived at Dundee United.

=== Everton ===
In October 1994, Everton were struggling under the management of Mike Walker and looking for options to reinvigorate their faltering season. The solution was to take two Rangers players on loan, Ian Durrant for one month and Ferguson for three. Ferguson's move to Everton was later made permanent by Walker's successor Joe Royle, and Ferguson played a key role in saving Everton from relegation, and also helping them win the 1994–95 FA Cup. The subsequent 1995–96 season was less successful for Ferguson. A persistent hernia problem caused him to be unavailable for large amounts of time, as did his prison sentence during the first half of the season.

On 28 December 1997, Ferguson scored a hat-trick against Bolton Wanderers in a 3–2 victory, the first time that a trio of headers had been scored in the Premier League. Everton finished the season surviving relegation only on goal difference.

Ferguson was sold to Newcastle United for a fee of £8 million in November 1998. The deal was done to sell Ferguson by the Everton chairman, Peter Johnson, without the knowledge of Walter Smith. Ferguson wrote a two-page goodbye letter in the club magazine to fans, stating his sadness at leaving and that he would never forget them.

=== Newcastle United ===
After bringing Ferguson to Newcastle, manager Ruud Gullit was rewarded when Ferguson scored twice on his debut against Wimbledon in the Premier League. The final result was a 3–1 victory to Newcastle. At the start of 1999, Ferguson suffered a hernia injury, meaning that he played only seven times in the 1998–99 season. He made his comeback on 11 April, coming on as a substitute in a 2–0 extra-time FA Cup semi-final win over Tottenham Hotspur, and did the same in the 1999 FA Cup Final, which Newcastle lost to Manchester United.

In 1999–2000, Ferguson scored in three rounds of the FA Cup as Newcastle beat Tottenham 6–1, Sheffield United 4–1 and Tranmere Rovers 3–2, before a semi-final elimination by Chelsea. He scored six league goals, including two in a 5–0 home win over Southampton on 16 January 2000.

=== Return to Everton ===
==== 2000–01 season ====
On 17 August 2000, Ferguson moved back to Everton for a fee of £3.75 million. The transfer had previously been close to collapse as he sought a £1 million "loyalty payment" from Newcastle for not personally asking for a transfer; he had made the same amount of money from Everton when he transferred in 1998 on the same basis.

Ferguson's return came at a time when Everton were facing the prospect of being without their goalscoring hero Kevin Campbell for the early months of the season due to injury. The £3.75 million fee was later revealed to have been financed through a media deal with NTL that was never completed.

Two days after signing, he played his first game in a 2–0 loss at Leeds United, coming on for Stephen Hughes after 56 minutes. On 23 August, on his return to Goodison Park, he scored twice in a 3–0 win over Charlton Athletic after coming on for Mark Hughes in the 67th minute. Ferguson settled the match with a low driven shot from a Thomas Gravesen pass before adding a second goal from a deflection in the dying seconds to complete the victory.

Ferguson was injured in only the second appearance of his return spell with the Blues and was in and out of the team that season with recurrent injury problems that required surgery. Despite this, he managed six goals in 13 appearances to help Everton avoid relegation. His first goal since the Charlton match came on 7 February 2001 against Leeds United, when his 23rd-minute scuffed right-foot shot found its way into the net, though he appeared to aggravate an arm injury while scoring and was substituted in the first half.

Ferguson's other crucial goals during the relegation battle included an equaliser against Manchester City on 8 April, created through a move involving Niclas Alexandersson crossing from the left for Campbell to head down before Ferguson slotted home despite lucky deflections.

In the Merseyside derby against Liverpool on 16 April, Ferguson scored in the 42nd minute after Kevin Campbell caused confusion in the penalty box, with Ferguson arriving to smash his effort beyond Sander Westerveld in a 2–3 defeat.

His final goal of the season helped secure Premier League survival, scoring just 47 seconds into the second half against Bradford City on 28 April by latching onto a long throw from Campbell, controlling it well and driving it fiercely past the goalkeeper in a crucial 2–1 victory.

Ferguson played under manager Walter Smith during his initial return, though their relationship was strained by chairman Peter Johnson's decision to sell Ferguson to Newcastle in 1998 without Smith's knowledge.

==== 2001–02 season ====
The 2001–02 season began promisingly for Ferguson, who scored from the penalty spot in Everton's opening match away to Charlton Athletic on 18 August 2001. After Charlton took the lead through Jonatan Johansson, Ferguson equalised from the penalty spot in the 64th minute after Kevin Campbell was fouled in the box, helping Everton to a 2–1 victory. The penalty was significant as Ferguson had previously avoided penalty-taking responsibility in a League Cup match against Sunderland three years earlier.

Three days later, Ferguson scored another penalty in a 1–1 draw against Tottenham Hotspur at Goodison Park on 20 August. After Darren Anderton had given Spurs the lead on the stroke of half-time against the run of play, Ferguson equalised from the penalty spot in the 64th minute following Gary Doherty's dismissal for fouling Campbell in the box. Despite Tottenham being reduced to nine men after Gustavo Poyet was also sent off two minutes later, Everton were unable to find a winner.

Ferguson continued his penalty-taking duties in the League Cup second round against Crystal Palace on 12 September, scoring in the 6th minute after Campbell was fouled. However, Palace equalised through Dougie Freedman's penalty just four minutes later, and despite Ferguson converting his spot-kick in the subsequent penalty shootout, Everton lost 4–5 on penalties after a 1–1 draw.

When Smith was dismissed in March 2002 following a 3–0 FA Cup defeat to Middlesbrough, Ferguson transitioned to playing under new manager David Moyes.

Ferguson's season was hampered by an undiagnosed injury that would cause recurring problems with pain manifesting in his leg, back, pelvis and groin. Despite this, he managed to score important goals under new manager David Moyes, who replaced Walter Smith in March 2002. Ferguson played a crucial role in Moyes' first match in charge, a 2–1 victory over Fulham on 16 March 2002. After David Unsworth had given Everton the lead after just 27 seconds, Ferguson scored his first league goal from open play that season in the 13th minute by charging down a clearance from Edwin van der Sar and slotting the ball into the net.

Despite being reduced to ten men following Thomas Gravesen's dismissal and Fulham pulling a goal back through Steed Malbranque, Ferguson captained the side and was moved back to play as a centre-back to help defend as Everton held on for a vital victory.

Ferguson scored again in Moyes' second match as manager, a thrilling 4–3 victory away to Derby County on 23 March 2002. With Everton leading 3–1, Ferguson scored the fourth goal in the 71st minute after Niclas Alexandersson jinked his way into the area and squared the ball for Ferguson to side-foot elegantly into the top left corner. Despite Derby scoring twice more to make the final score 4–3, the victory represented only Everton's second away win of the season.

However, the optimism from Moyes' early matches was dampened by a heavy 6–2 defeat away to Newcastle United on 29 March 2002. Ferguson gave Everton the perfect start, scoring in the 6th minute with a speculative lob over Shay Given from a throw-in before he had even tied his bootlaces after changing his boots. Despite Niclas Alexandersson adding a second goal to make it 2–2, Newcastle responded with four unanswered goals in a devastating display.

Ferguson continued his important contributions under Moyes with a crucial equalising goal against Leicester City on 13 April 2002. After falling 2–0 behind to goals from Brian Deane, Ferguson scored with five minutes remaining, firing home a half-volley from a free-kick to salvage a vital 2–2 draw in Everton's fight against relegation. On 1 April 2002, Ferguson was sent off after 20 minutes for elbowing Bolton Wanderers' Kostas Konstantinidis in an off-the-ball incident in a 3–1 win for a struggling Everton side.

==== 2002–03 season ====
The 2002–03 season proved to be a largely lost campaign for Ferguson due to injury problems. Despite showing promise in pre-season friendlies, where he scored a goal in a match against Queens Park that also featured a hat-trick from emerging teenager Wayne Rooney, Ferguson's persistent undiagnosed injury problems severely limited his playing time. He required surgery during the season and managed only seven appearances without scoring a single goal.

Ferguson's limited involvement became a subject of significant criticism. His 192 minutes of play in 2002–03 as a goalless substitute cost the club £9,000 per minute.

==== 2003–04 season ====
Ferguson's persistent injury problems were eventually diagnosed as a compressed sciatic nerve, a condition that the Everton physiotherapy staff believed he had struggled with for approximately four years, with pain manifesting in various areas including his leg, back, pelvis and groin, making it difficult to diagnose. Once properly identified and treated, Ferguson regained reasonable match fitness and began scoring goals again in the 2003–04 season.

In August 2003, Jamie Jackson of The Guardian called Ferguson "arguably the biggest waste of money of all", citing his high transfer fees and wages compared to his injury record and age. By that point, he had scored 12 times in 41 games in three years at Everton, while earning over £5 million in salary.

Ferguson's return to form was evident from the start of the season, when he scored a penalty against Newcastle United on 13 September 2003. With Everton reduced to ten men following Gary Naysmith's dismissal, Ferguson converted from the spot in the 88th minute to secure a 2–2 draw after Alan Shearer had scored two penalties for the visitors.

Ferguson continued to score regularly throughout the season in both league and cup competitions, including goals against Leeds United, Manchester United, and Southampton. His penalty-taking reliability was particularly evident in cup matches, where he scored from the spot against both Stockport County in the League Cup and twice against Norwich City in the FA Cup, helping David Moyes secure his first FA Cup victory as Everton manager.

On 28 December 2003, Ferguson came on for Marcus Bent in the 74th minute of Everton's 2–0 loss at Charlton Athletic, and within ten minutes he was sent off for an elbow on Hermann Hreiðarsson.

Ferguson was accused of racial abuse by Fulham's Luís Boa Morte after an FA Cup fourth round match in January 2004. The accusation was dismissed by the Football Association, who found insufficient evidence.

One of Ferguson's most notorious disciplinary incidents occurred during a match against Leicester City, when he was sent off for two yellow cards and subsequently confronted German midfielder Steffen Freund, creating what became one of the most widely discussed images in Premier League history.

==== 2004–05 season ====
In the summer of 2004, Everton attempted to buy out the final year of Ferguson's contract, which was worth approximately £2 million in salary, for a reduced payment of £500,000. Ferguson rejected this offer and instead adopted a new role primarily as a substitute to support David Moyes' tactical approach. This arrangement earned him a contract extension for the following summer.

One of the highlights of Ferguson's later career came on 20 April 2005, when he scored a crucial header against Manchester United in a 1–0 victory at Goodison Park. Ferguson met a Mikel Arteta free-kick with a stooping header after 55 minutes to secure Everton's first Premier League victory over United since his own goal in 1995. The goal was particularly significant as it came during Everton's push for Champions League qualification and coincided with Wayne Rooney's first return to Goodison Park since his controversial transfer to Manchester United. Ferguson later described the atmosphere as one of the best he had experienced at the ground, saying: "The roof came off, it [the ground] was shaking."

==== 2005–06 season ====
During the 2005–06 season, Ferguson was sent off against Wigan Athletic for violent conduct. His confrontation with Paul Scharner and subsequent fracas with Pascal Chimbonda resulted in a seven-match ban and his eighth Premier League red card, equalling Patrick Vieira's record.

Ferguson's final season was marked by disappointment, particularly the controversial disallowing of his goal in Everton's UEFA Champions League qualifier against Villarreal by referee Pierluigi Collina. The goal, a powerful header from a Mikel Arteta corner, would have levelled the tie and potentially sent the match to extra time, but Collina ruled it out for an alleged foul by Marcus Bent away from the ball. Diego Forlán scored moments later to eliminate Everton from the Champions League, and Ferguson later stated that the decision still "rankles" him, believing Everton could have performed well in the group stages.

On 7 May 2006, against West Bromwich Albion at Goodison Park, Ferguson was named captain in the game that marked the end of his Everton career. His 90th-minute penalty kick was saved by Tomasz Kuszczak, but he subsequently scored from the rebound, netting his final goal for the club. Ferguson was not given a new Everton deal and retired, moving his family to Mallorca and spurning advances from a number of clubs. The decision to award Ferguson the captaincy was Moyes' way of signalling that it would be his final appearance, though Ferguson was not officially informed until after the match.

==== Fan relationship and cultural impact ====
Throughout his second spell, Ferguson maintained his status as a cult figure among Everton supporters, earning the nickname "Big Dunc". Despite his injury problems and disciplinary issues, he retained what observers described as an "idol-like status" during some of the club's darkest periods. Ferguson's emotional connection with the supporters was exemplified by his passionate goal celebrations and his visible commitment to the club's cause.

==== Testimonial match ====
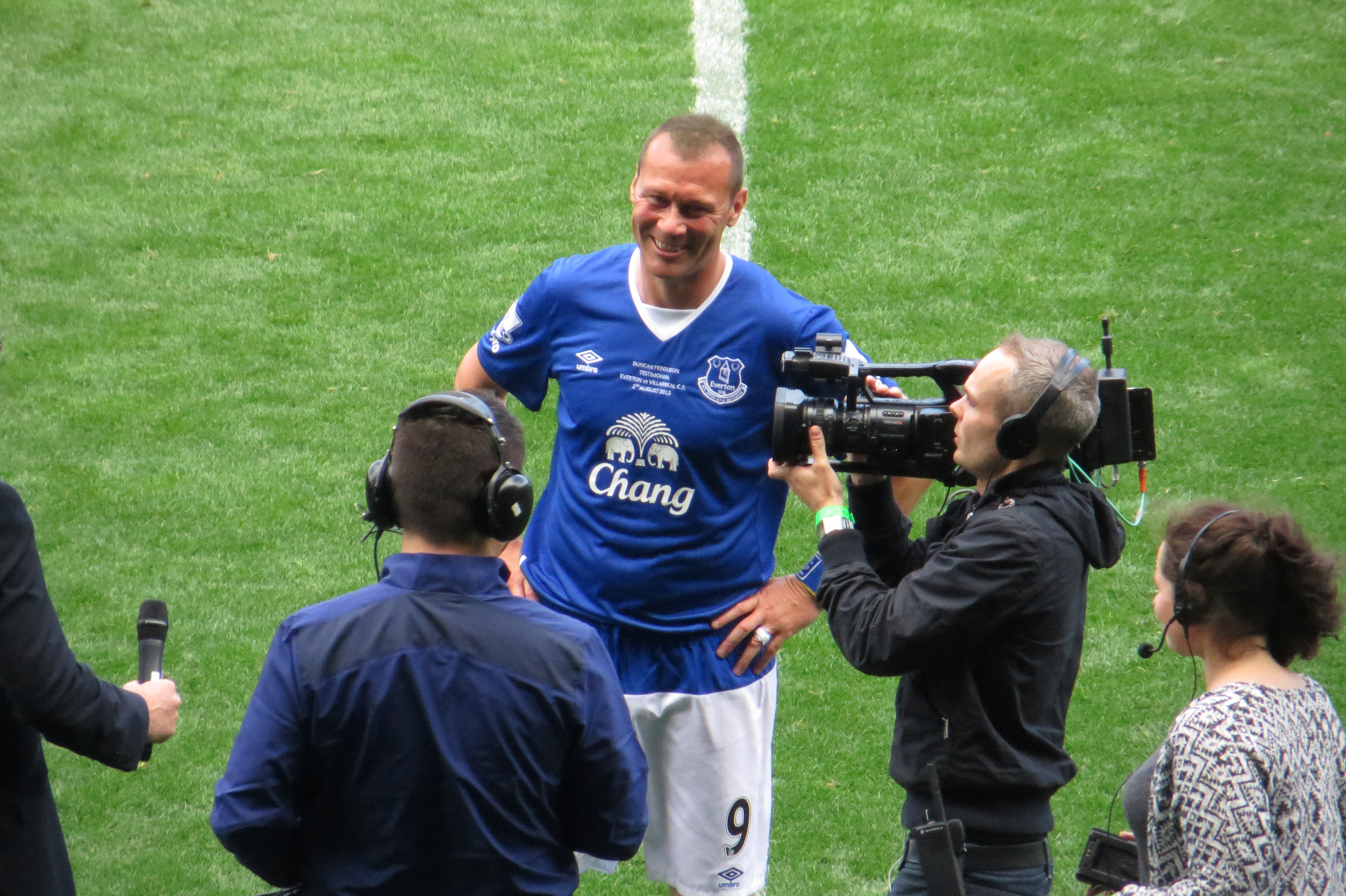
Ferguson on his testimonial in 2015

Ferguson played for Everton in a testimonial match in his honour on 2 August 2015 against Villarreal. The choice of Villarreal as opponents provided what the club described as "a nice twist" given the controversial circumstances of their 2005 Champions League qualifier encounter.

== International career ==
Ferguson made his first full international appearance for Scotland on 17 May 1992, in a 1–0 win over the United States in Denver. He was selected for UEFA Euro 1992 in Sweden, making one substitute appearance against reigning champions the Netherlands on 12 June. He withdrew from UEFA Euro 1996 in England due to surgery on a recurring hernia. He made seven Scotland appearances in all, with his last appearance coming in February 1997.

Ferguson refused international selection after 1997, partly in protest against his treatment by the SFA after his conviction for assault on John McStay and in particular the imposition of a 12-game ban on top of his three-month prison sentence. Ferguson believed that second punishment violated the principle of double jeopardy. Speaking in February 2023, Ferguson said that not playing more for Scotland was the "biggest regret in my career". He also revealed that Scotland managers had repeatedly asked him to come out of retirement, with the last request coming from Walter Smith in 2005. Ferguson blamed his own "pig-headedness" for not accepting those invitations.

== Coaching career ==
=== Everton ===
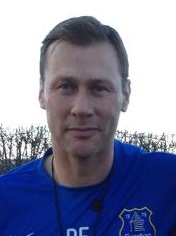
Ferguson with Everton in 2013

Having spent five years in Mallorca following his retirement from playing, Ferguson contacted his former manager at Everton, David Moyes. Ferguson asked if he could work with the Everton academy students at Finch Farm.

Initially Ferguson was a voluntary worker at the academy, working for Alan Irvine, a former mentor of his from his playing career. Although Ferguson remains disappointed with the Scottish FA for what he sees as a lack of support following his sentencing in 1995, he enrolled on a nine-day Scottish FA organised coaching course in Largs, Scotland to earn a UEFA B-Licence. In May 2012, he returned to Largs to achieve a UEFA A licence and in January 2013 he enrolled on a further course for the UEFA Pro Licence. In February 2014 Ferguson was promoted to the first-team coaching staff at Everton. His first game in the role was a home game against West Ham United on 1 March 2014.

Following the dismissal of manager Marco Silva on 5 December 2019, Ferguson was named as caretaker manager of Everton. In his first game in charge two days later, Everton beat Chelsea 3–1 to lift themselves out of the relegation zone. Following the appointment of Carlo Ancelotti as the new manager later that month, Ferguson was made assistant manager, a role he retained under Rafael Benítez who joined the club following Ancelotti's departure to Real Madrid in June 2021.

On 18 January 2022, Ferguson was again appointed caretaker manager following the sacking of Benítez. He oversaw one game as caretaker, a 1–0 home loss to Aston Villa, before Frank Lampard was appointed as the new manager. Ferguson remained at the club for the rest of the season as a first-team coach, before announcing his departure from the club in July 2022.

=== Forest Green Rovers ===
On 26 January 2023, Ferguson was appointed head coach of League One side Forest Green Rovers, his first managerial role of his career.

Upon his appointment, Ferguson stated; "I'm really delighted to join FGR for the next step of my career, and I plan to be here for a while. We have a bit of a fight on our hands to stay up in League One and I am ready for the challenge." Dale Vince, Chairman of the club, commented: "We're all excited to welcome Duncan, he is someone I have admired from afar for a while. It's just fantastic to have the opportunity to work with him in this next phase of our journey toward the Championship." Ferguson did not win a game as manager until 26 March, when Forest Green beat second-placed Sheffield Wednesday 1–0. Forest Green were relegated to League Two on 15 April after a 5–1 home defeat to Barnsley. With four games remaining in the season, they became the first team in any EFL league to be relegated in the 2022–23 season. He left the club on 4 July 2023. During his 18 games in charge, Forest Green Rovers won once.

=== Inverness Caledonian Thistle ===
Ferguson was appointed manager of Scottish Championship club Inverness Caledonian Thistle on 26 September 2023; at the time of his appointment, the club was bottom of the league. Returning to Scottish football after an absence of 29 years, his first game as manager of Inverness Caledonian Thistle was on 30 September, a 3–2 away win against Arbroath. The club were relegated after a 5–3 aggregate defeat to Hamilton Academical. On 3 October 2024, Ferguson admitted to working with no salary to help the club through its financial crisis. On 23 October 2024, he was sacked after the club was put into administration the previous day.

== Personal life ==
=== Family ===
Ferguson is married to Janine Ferguson. The couple have three children.

Ferguson's son Cameron is also a professional footballer who has played for Connah's Quay Nomads.

=== Community involvement and charitable work ===
Ferguson has been described as a "pillar of the community in Merseyside", particularly in his work with disadvantaged children who share similar tough upbringings to his own. In December 2015, during his testimonial year, Ferguson donated a Variety Sunshine Coach to Everton in the Community, with funds raised specifically for this purpose. The minibus was intended to help young people who faced difficulties accessing public transport to reach sporting and educational opportunities.

Ferguson has stated his commitment to helping local communities, saying: "The coach is going to be brilliant for the local community and it's fantastic that we can help in getting these young people out and about, allowing them to see different parts of the city. Hopefully this coach will give children the chance to attend sessions and events that they may not have been able to previously."

=== Autobiography ===
In May 2025, Ferguson published his autobiography titled "BIG DUNC: The Upfront Autobiography", which became a The Sunday Times bestseller. The book provides what reviewers described as a "brutally honest" account of his life, covering his experiences in prison, his off-field controversies, and his efforts to turn his life around through football. Ferguson undertook promotional tours for the book, including appearances at St George's Hall in Liverpool.

=== Burglary attempts at his homes ===
In 2001, two burglars broke into Ferguson's home in Rufford, Lancashire. Ferguson confronted them and was able to detain one of them, who subsequently spent three days in hospital. The second man managed to flee but was eventually caught. Both men were sentenced to 15 months' imprisonment for their actions.

In January 2003, Ferguson caught another burglar at his home in Formby, Merseyside; the burglar attacked Ferguson, who retaliated. The burglar was hospitalised and later alleged that Ferguson had assaulted him, but this was dismissed by police.

=== Convictions for physical altercations ===
Ferguson has had four convictions for assault – two arising from taxi rank scuffles, one an altercation with a fisherman in an Anstruther pub, and one for his on-field headbutt on Raith Rovers defender John McStay in 1994 while playing for Rangers, which resulted in a rare conviction for an on-field incident.

The first incident led to a £100 fine for headbutting a policeman and a £25 fine for a breach of the peace, while the second resulted in a £200 fine for punching and kicking a supporter on crutches. He was sentenced to a year's probation for the third offence. For the 1994 on-the-field headbutting, he received and served a three-month jail term for assault. During his time in jail, Wayne Rooney, who regarded him as an idol, sent him letters, and Ferguson always wrote back. Ferguson's troubles with the law and his imprisonment inspired Finnish composer Osmo Tapio Räihälä to write a symphonic poem as a "musical portrait" of Ferguson, titled Barlinnie Nine.

=== Campaigning ===
In 2009, Ferguson pledged his support to the "Keep Everton in Our City" campaign, saying:

During my time at Everton, Goodison Park came to feel like a second home, with the supporters of the club, and the people of the city becoming a second family to me. If you were to take Everton out of the city, I firmly believe the club could no longer call itself the "People's Club" and I give my whole-hearted support to the campaign to keep Everton in the city.

== Career statistics ==
=== Club ===
Appearances and goals by club, season and competition
| Club | Season | League | | | National Cup (Note: Includes Scottish Cup, FA Cup) | | League Cup (Note: Includes Scottish League Cup, Football League Cup) | | Europe | | Total | |
| Club | Season | Division | Apps | Goals | Apps | Goals | Apps | Goals | Apps | Goals | Apps | Goals |
|---|---|---|---|---|---|---|---|---|---|---|---|---|
| Dundee United | 1990–91 | Scottish Premier Division | 9 | 1 | 5 | 3 | 0 | 0 | – | | 14 | 4 |
| Dundee United | 1991–92 | Scottish Premier Division | 38 | 15 | 2 | 2 | 1 | 0 | – | | 41 | 17 |
| Dundee United | 1992–93 | Scottish Premier Division | 30 | 12 | 1 | 1 | 2 | 2 | – | | 33 | 15 |
| Dundee United | Total | | 77 | 28 | 8 | 6 | 3 | 2 | – | | 88 | 36 |
| Rangers | 1993–94 | Scottish Premier Division | 10 | 1 | 3 | 0 | 2 | 0 | – | | 15 | 1 |
| Rangers | 1994–95 | Scottish Premier Division | 4 | 1 | 0 | 0 | 2 | 3 | 0 | 0 | 6 | 4 |
| Rangers | Total | | 14 | 2 | 3 | 0 | 4 | 3 | 0 | 0 | 21 | 5 |
| Everton | 1994–95 | Premier League | 23 | 7 | 4 | 1 | 1 | 0 | – | | 28 | 8 |
| Everton | 1995–96 | Premier League | 18 | 5 | 2 | 2 | – | | – | | 20 | 7 |
| Everton | 1996–97 | Premier League | 33 | 10 | 2 | 1 | 1 | 0 | – | | 36 | 11 |
| Everton | 1997–98 | Premier League | 29 | 11 | 1 | 0 | 2 | 0 | – | | 32 | 11 |
| Everton | 1998–99 | Premier League | 13 | 4 | – | | 4 | 1 | – | | 17 | 5 |
| Everton | Total | | 116 | 37 | 9 | 4 | 8 | 1 | – | | 133 | 42 |
| Newcastle United | 1998–99 | Premier League | 7 | 2 | 2 | 0 | – | | – | | 9 | 2 |
| Newcastle United | 1999–2000 | Premier League | 23 | 6 | 6 | 3 | 0 | 0 | 3 | 1 | 32 | 10 |
| Newcastle United | Total | | 30 | 8 | 8 | 3 | 0 | 0 | 3 | 1 | 41 | 12 |
| Everton | 2000–01 | Premier League | 12 | 6 | 1 | 0 | – | | – | | 13 | 6 |
| Everton | 2001–02 | Premier League | 22 | 6 | 2 | 1 | 1 | 1 | – | | 25 | 8 |
| Everton | 2002–03 | Premier League | 7 | 0 | – | | 1 | 0 | – | | 8 | 0 |
| Everton | 2003–04 | Premier League | 20 | 5 | 2 | 2 | 2 | 2 | – | | 24 | 9 |
| Everton | 2004–05 | Premier League | 35 | 5 | 0 | 0 | 2 | 1 | – | | 37 | 6 |
| Everton | 2005–06 | Premier League | 27 | 1 | 2 | 0 | 0 | 0 | 4 | 0 | 33 | 1 |
| Everton | Total | | 123 | 23 | 7 | 3 | 6 | 4 | 4 | 0 | 140 | 30 |
| Career total | | | 360 | 98 | 35 | 16 | 21 | 10 | 7 | 1 | 423 | 126 |

=== International ===
Scotland
| Year | Apps | Goals |
|---|---|---|
| 1992 | 3 | 0 |
| 1993 | 1 | 0 |
| 1994 | 1 | 0 |
| 1996 | 1 | 0 |
| 1997 | 1 | 0 |
| Total | 7 | 0 |

== Managerial statistics ==
As of match played 20 November 2026

Managerial record by team and tenure
| Team | From | To | Record | | | | | Ref. |
| Team | From | To | P | W | D | L | Win % | Ref. |
|---|---|---|---|---|---|---|---|---|
| Everton (interim) | 5 December 2019 | 21 December 2019 | 4 | 1 | 3 | 0 | 25.00 | |
| Everton (interim) | 18 January 2022 | 31 January 2022 | 1 | 0 | 0 | 1 | 0.00 | |
| Forest Green Rovers | 26 January 2023 | 4 July 2023 | 18 | 1 | 3 | 14 | 5.56 | |
| Inverness Caledonian Thistle | 26 September 2023 | 23 October 2024 | 53 | 17 | 20 | 16 | 32.08 | |
| Glentoran | 19 October 2026 | Present | 4 | 1 | 2 | 1 | 25.00 | |
| Total | | | 80 | 20 | 28 | 32 | 25.00 | |

== Honours ==
Dundee United

- Scottish Cup runner-up: 1990–91

Rangers

- Scottish Premier Division: 1993–94
- Scottish Cup runner-up: 1993–94

Everton

- FA Cup: 1994–95

Newcastle United

- FA Cup runner-up: 1998–99

Individual

- Premier League Player of the Month: February 1995
