= Jochen Müller =

German footballer

Personal information
- Full name: Jochen Müller
- Date of birth: 18 April 1963 (age 63)
- Place of birth: Erbach, West Germany
- Height: 1.82 m (5 ft 11 1/2 in)
- Position: Defender

Team information
- Current team: SV Waldhof Mannheim (Under-17 coach)

Youth career
- FC Erbach

Senior career*
Years	Team	Apps	(Gls)
1986–1991	SV Waldhof Mannheim	120	(4)
1991–1992	Dundee United	4	(0)
- * Club domestic league appearances and goals

Jochen Müller (born 18 April 1963, in Erbach) is a German former footballer who played as a defender. Müller began his career with hometown club Erbach before moving to Mannheim in 1986. Müller spent five seasons with the club before moving to Scottish side Dundee United in 1991. Müller managed five appearances before injury forced him into early retirement.

In July 2007, Müller returned to Mannheim as a youth coach on a three-year contract.
