= 1990–91 in Scottish football =

Premier Division champions
- Rangers

Division One champions
- Falkirk

Division Two champions
- Stirling Albion

Scottish Cup winners
- Motherwell

League Cup winners
- Rangers

Challenge Cup winners
- Dundee

Junior Cup winners
- Auchinleck Talbot

Teams in Europe
- Aberdeen, Celtic, Dundee United, Heart of Midlothian, Rangers

Scotland national team
- UEFA Euro 1992 qualifying
- ← 1989–90 1991–92 →

The 1990–91 season was the 94th season of competitive football in Scotland. It was notable for the fact that there was a last day title decider at Ibrox between Rangers and Aberdeen. Both teams went into the match level on points and goal difference, but Rangers needed to win the match because Aberdeen had scored two goals more. Rangers won the title with a 2–0 win thanks to two goals by Mark Hateley.

== Notable events ==
- 11 November – Duncan Ferguson makes his debut, playing for Dundee United against Rangers at Ibrox, in a match they won 2–1.

== Scottish Premier Division ==
Pos	Team	Pld	W	D	L	GF	GA	GD	Pts	Qualification or relegation
1	Rangers (C)	36	24	7	5	62	23	+39	55	Qualification for the European Cup first round
2	Aberdeen	36	22	9	5	62	27	+35	53	Qualification for the UEFA Cup first round
3	Celtic	36	17	7	12	52	38	+14	41	Qualification for the UEFA Cup first round
4	Dundee United	36	17	7	12	41	29	+12	41	
5	Heart of Midlothian	36	14	7	15	48	55	−7	35	
6	Motherwell	36	12	9	15	51	50	+1	33	Qualification for the Cup Winners' Cup first round
7	St Johnstone	36	11	9	16	41	54	−13	31	
8	Dunfermline Athletic	36	8	11	17	38	61	−23	27	
9	Hibernian	36	6	13	17	24	51	−27	25	
10	St Mirren	36	5	9	22	28	59	−31	19	

Source: Statto.com
Rules for classification: 1) points; 2) goal difference; 3) number of goals scored.
(C) Champions

Champions: Rangers
No Relegation

== Scottish League Division One ==
Pos	Team	Pld	W	D	L	GF	GA	GD	Pts	Promotion or relegation
1	Falkirk (C, P)	39	21	12	6	70	35	+35	54	Promotion to the Premier Division
2	Airdrieonians (P)	39	21	11	7	69	43	+26	53	Promotion to the Premier Division
3	Dundee	39	22	8	9	59	33	+26	52	
4	Partick Thistle	39	16	13	10	56	53	+3	45	
5	Kilmarnock	39	15	13	11	58	48	+10	43	
6	Hamilton Academical	39	16	10	13	50	41	+9	42	
7	Raith Rovers	39	14	9	16	54	64	−10	37	
8	Clydebank	39	13	10	16	65	70	−5	36	
9	Morton	39	11	13	15	48	55	−7	35	
10	Forfar Athletic	39	9	15	15	50	57	−7	33	
11	Meadowbank Thistle	39	10	13	16	56	68	−12	33	
12	Ayr United	39	10	12	17	47	59	−12	32	
13	Clyde (R)	39	9	9	21	41	61	−20	27	Relegation to the Second Division
14	Brechin City (R)	39	7	10	22	44	80	−36	24	Relegation to the Second Division

Source: RSSSF and statto
Rules for classification: 1) points; 2) goal difference; 3) number of goals scored.
(C) Champions; (P) Promoted; (R) Relegated

Promoted: Falkirk, Airdrieonians
Relegated: Clyde, Brechin City

== Scottish League Division Two ==
Pos	Team	Pld	W	D	L	GF	GA	GD	Pts	Promotion
1	Stirling Albion (C, P)	39	20	14	5	62	24	+38	54	Promotion to the First Division
2	Montrose (P)	39	20	6	13	54	34	+20	46	Promotion to the First Division
3	Cowdenbeath	39	18	9	12	64	50	+14	45	
4	Stenhousemuir	39	16	12	11	56	42	+14	44	
5	Queen's Park	39	17	8	14	48	42	+6	42	
6	Stranraer	39	19	4	16	62	58	+4	42	
7	Dumbarton	39	15	10	14	50	49	+1	40	
8	Berwick Rangers	39	15	10	14	51	57	−6	40	
9	Alloa Athletic	39	13	11	15	51	46	+5	37	
10	East Fife	39	14	9	16	57	65	−8	37	
11	Albion Rovers	39	11	13	15	48	63	−15	35	
12	Queen of the South	39	9	12	18	46	62	−16	30	
13	East Stirlingshire	39	9	11	19	36	72	−36	29	
14	Arbroath	39	7	11	21	39	60	−21	25	

Rules for classification: 1) points; 2) goal difference; 3) number of goals scored.
(C) Champions; (P) Promoted

Promoted: Stirling Albion, Montrose

== Other honours ==
=== Cup honours ===
Competition	Winner	Score	Runner-up
Scottish Cup 1990–91	Motherwell	4 – 3 (a.e.t.)	Dundee United
League Cup 1990–91	Rangers	2 – 1 (a.e.t.)	Celtic
Challenge Cup	Dundee	3 – 2 (a.e.t.)	Ayr United
Youth Cup	Dundee United	2 – 0	Hibernian
Junior Cup	Auchinleck Talbot	1 – 0	Newtongrange Star

=== Individual honours ===
==== SPFA awards ====
Award	Winner	Club
Players' Player of the Year	(England) Paul Elliott	Celtic
Young Player of the Year	(Scotland) Eoin Jess	Aberdeen

==== SFWA awards ====
Award	Winner	Club
Footballer of the Year	(Scotland) Maurice Malpas	Dundee United
Manager of the Year	(Scotland) Alex Totten	St Johnstone

== Scotland national team ==
Date	Venue	Opponents	Score	Competition	Scotland scorer(s)
12 September 1990	Hampden Park, Glasgow (H)	Romania	2–1	ECQG2	John Robertson, Ally McCoist
17 October 1990	Hampden Park, Glasgow (H)	Switzerland	2–1	ECQG2	John Robertson, Gary McAllister
14 November 1990	Vasil Levski National Stadium, Sofia (A)	Bulgaria	1–1	ECQG2	Ally McCoist
6 February 1991	Ibrox Stadium, Glasgow (H)	(Soviet Union) USSR	0–1	Friendly	
27 March 1991	Hampden Park, Glasgow (H)	Bulgaria	1–1	ECQG2	John Collins
1 May 1991	Stadio Olimpico, Serravalle (A)	San Marino	2–0	ECQG2	Gordon Strachan (pen.), Gordon Durie

Key:

- (H) = Home match
- (A) = Away match
- ECQG2 = European Championship qualifying – Group 2

== See also ==
- 1990–91 Aberdeen F.C. season
- 1990–91 Dundee United F.C. season
- 1990–91 Rangers F.C. season
