= Michael O'Neill (footballer) =

Northern Irish football manager and former player (born 1969)

Michael O'Neill MBE
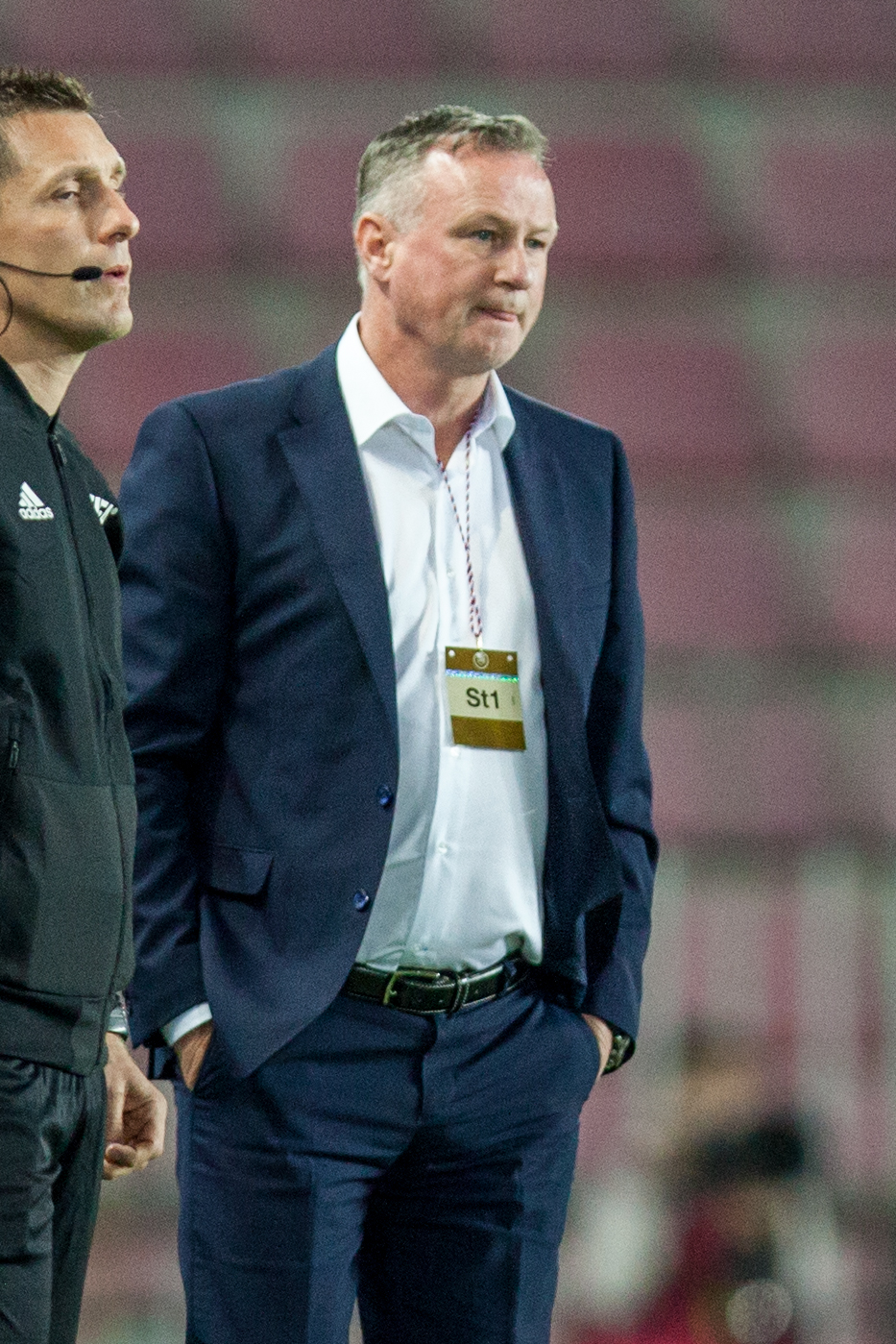
- O'Neill with Northern Ireland in 2019

Personal information
- Full name: Michael Andrew Martin O'Neill
- Date of birth: 5 July 1969 (age 57)
- Place of birth: Portadown, Northern Ireland
- Height: 1.80 m (5 ft 11 in)
- Position: Midfielder

Team information
- Current team: Northern Ireland (manager)

Youth career
- 1980–1984: Star United
- 1984: Chimney Corner

Senior career*
Years	Team	Apps	(Gls)
1984–1987	Coleraine	18	(4)
1987–1989	Newcastle United	48	(15)
1989–1993	Dundee United	64	(11)
1993–1996	Hibernian	97	(19)
1996–1998	Coventry City	5	(0)
1998	→ Aberdeen (loan)	6	(0)
1998	→ Reading (loan)	9	(1)
1998–2000	Wigan Athletic	66	(2)
2000–2001	St Johnstone	9	(0)
2001	Portland Timbers	22	(5)
2001–2002	Clydebank	19	(4)
2002–2004	Glentoran	44	(4)
2004	Ayr United	2	(0)
Total		409	(65)

International career
1994	Northern Ireland U21	1	(0)
1989	Northern Ireland U23	1	(0)
1994–1999	Northern Ireland B	2	(0)
1988–1996	Northern Ireland	31	(4)

Managerial career
- 2006–2008: Brechin City
- 2009–2011: Shamrock Rovers
- 2011–2020: Northern Ireland
- 2019–2022: Stoke City
- 2022–: Northern Ireland
- 2026: Blackburn Rovers
- * Club domestic league appearances and goals

Michael Andrew Martin O'Neill (born 5 July 1969) is a Northern Irish professional football coach and former player who is the manager of the Northern Ireland national team.

O'Neill started his career with Coleraine, before playing for a number of clubs in England, Scotland and the United States. These included Newcastle United, Dundee United, Hibernian, Wigan Athletic and Portland Timbers. He was capped 31 times at international level by Northern Ireland, scoring four goals.

His first managerial role was with Brechin City from 2006 to 2008. He then joined Shamrock Rovers, where he won two League of Ireland titles and the Setanta Cup. He became Northern Ireland manager for the first time in 2011. Under his management, Northern Ireland qualified for their first European Championship finals, in 2016. In November 2019, O'Neill was appointed manager of Stoke City until his dismissal in August 2022. In December 2022, O'Neill became Northern Ireland manager for a second time. He had a short-term spell as manager of Championship club Blackburn Rovers between February 2026 until the end of the 2025–26 season, combining the role of Northern Ireland manager and guiding Blackburn to Championship safety.

== Early life ==
Michael Andrew Martin O'Neill was born on 5 July 1969 in Portadown, County Armagh, to parents Dessie and Patricia O'Neill. His father, Dessie played hurling as a goalkeeper for All Saints, Antrim GAA, and Ulster whilst his brother Sean, was a track athlete who competed from Northern Ireland in the Men's 800 metres at the 1982 Commonwealth Games.

Raised Catholic, he briefly attended Presentation Convent Primary School before the family moved to Ballymena, County Antrim. In Ballymena he attended All Saints Primary School and later St Louis Grammar School, where he won the Northern Ireland Schools FA Cup in 1980 against St Oliver Plunkett whose side included Jim Magilton. He was also a promising Gaelic Football player, representing Antrim GAA minors. He also played association football at youth level for Ballymena's Star United FC for four years before joining Chimney Corner as a 14-year-old. His manager Alec McKee did not think it was right to try to integrate a young teenager into his first team and thought he should play for Coleraine's reserve side.

== Club career ==
O'Neill was brought in to Coleraine by former Northern Ireland internationals Bertie Peacock and Jim Platt, making his debut in the Irish League at the age of 15 and was a regular in the side by the age of 18. After playing against Dundee United in a UEFA Cup tie in 1987 O'Neill came close to joining the Scottish club.

In October 1987 he was signed by Newcastle United for a £100,000 fee. After scoring 13 goals in 22 appearances during his first season and helping Newcastle finish eighth in the First Division, O'Neill suffered from injuries and loss of form in his second season which saw Newcastle relegated to the Second Division.

O'Neill joined Dundee United in August 1989 for a club record fee of £350,000. A difficult relationship with manager Jim McLean came to a head in 1991 when O'Neill refused to extend his contract and was dropped from the first team. He left the club in 1993 joining Hibernian where he had three successful seasons under the management of Alex Miller. O'Neill agreed to join Austrian club Sturm Graz on a Bosman free transfer in 1996 but changed his mind after an offer to return to English football with Coventry City where he spent just over two years.

After spending time on loan to Aberdeen and Reading during the 1997–98 season O'Neill left Coventry to sign for Wigan Athletic in September 1998. He later played for St Johnstone, Portland Timbers, Clydebank, Glentoran and Ayr United.

== International career ==
O'Neill played for the under-21, under-23, B and full international teams of Northern Ireland. He scored four goals for the national team, including two in a 5–3 win against Austria.

== Managerial career ==
O'Neill retired from playing football in 2004 and began a career in financial services. A year later he took a part-time role as assistant manager at Cowdenbeath, working with Mixu Paatelainen.

=== Brechin City ===
O'Neill became manager of Scottish side Brechin City in April 2006. He won the Second Division Manager of the Month award in both December 2007 and October 2008. O'Neill was released by Brechin City to join Shamrock Rovers on 13 December 2008.

=== Shamrock Rovers ===
At the press conference when unveiled as Rovers manager, O'Neill cited Gordon Strachan as his main managerial influence. O'Neill was awarded the Irish Soccer Writers Manager of the Month award for July 2009 and eventually guided Shamrock Rovers to second place in the 2009 League of Ireland. In October 2010, he guided the club to win the 2010 League of Ireland title, their first league championship since 1994. O'Neill led Rovers to the 2011 Setanta Sports Cup and then made history by being the first manager of a League of Ireland team to reach the group stages of a European competition. Rovers defeated Partizan Belgrade in the play-off round of the 2011–12 UEFA Europa League. Shamrock Rovers retained their league title in the 2011 season. New contract talks between O'Neill and Shamrock Rovers stalled and he left the club in December 2011. O'Neill won the Soccer Writers Association Personality of the Year award for 2011.

=== Northern Ireland ===
O'Neill was appointed manager of Northern Ireland on 28 December 2011, with one report stating he was "the first Catholic in 50 years to manage Northern Ireland". However, this is almost certainly untrue, since previous managers Lawrie Sanchez (2004–07) and Lawrie McMenemy (1998–99) were both educated in Roman Catholic schools. O'Neill's first game in charge ended in defeat with a 3–0 loss to Norway. In his next game an inexperienced Northern Ireland team were defeated 6–0 by the Netherlands in Amsterdam. During their 2014 FIFA World Cup qualification, Northern Ireland earned some creditable results, including a 1–1 draw away to Portugal and a 1–0 home win against Russia. In November 2013, O'Neill agreed a new two-year deal with Irish Football Association to remain as Northern Ireland manager.

Northern Ireland qualified for their first ever European Championship, Euro 2016 in France after defeating Greece 3–1 at Windsor Park on 8 October 2015. It was the first time in 30 years that Northern Ireland had qualified for a major tournament. At the tournament itself he led the side to the second round, losing narrowly to Wales but recorded a surprise victory over Ukraine in the group stages. In January 2018, O'Neill turned down an offer to become manager of Scotland following discussions with the Scottish Football Association. In March 2018, he gained media attention after complaining that the Football Association of Ireland was aggressively recruiting young Catholic footballers from the north to play for the Republic of Ireland national football team.

O'Neill initially continued as Northern Ireland manager after his appointment by Stoke City in November 2019. He had intended to stay on for UEFA Euro 2020 playoffs, which had been scheduled for March 2020, but these were postponed by the COVID-19 pandemic. With the Euro 2020 playoffs delayed at least until the autumn of 2020, O'Neill resigned as Northern Ireland manager on 22 April.

=== Stoke City ===
O'Neill was appointed manager of EFL Championship club Stoke City on 8 November 2019. He joined Stoke with the side bottom of the 2019–20 EFL Championship table after struggling under the management of Nathan Jones. O'Neill won his first match in charge of Stoke, 4–2 away at Barnsley on 9 November. Stoke began to improve and secured vital victories over Wigan Athletic, Luton Town, Sheffield Wednesday and Huddersfield Town, helping the team move out of the relegation zone at the turn of the year. In the January transfer window O'Neill cancelled the loans of Cameron Carter-Vickers, Mark Duffy and Scott Hogan, whilst also letting Peter Etebo, Badou Ndiaye and Ryan Woods leave on loan. Into the team came Northern Irish midfielder Jordan Thompson from Blackpool, center-back James Chester on loan from Aston Villa and young midfielder Tashan Oakley-Boothe from Tottenham Hotspur. Stoke defeated Hull City 5–1 on 7 March 2020 moving the team three points above the drop with nine remaining matches. The Championship was suspended on 13 March due to the COVID-19 pandemic.

Championship squads returned to training on 25 May with the intention to finish the season behind closed doors. Stoke's preparations for the season restart were disrupted after O'Neill tested positive for coronavirus on 9 June which caused a training match against Manchester United to be cancelled. Stoke won four of the remaining nine matches to avoid relegation and finish in 15th position, eight points clear of the relegation zone.

Due to the ongoing pandemic the 2020–21 season began later in September with matches continuing to played behind closed doors. O'Neill brought in a number of free transfers including James Chester, Morgan Fox, Steven Fletcher and Mikel John Obi with Jacob Brown the only arrival to have been bought. Stoke began the season by winning eight of their first 16 matches and were just outside the play-off places at the beginning of December. However a number of injuries to key players most notably to Tyrese Campbell saw goals dry up and the team went nine games without a win at the turn of the year. Stoke were unable to put a sustained run of results together in March and April and ended the season in mid-table.

Stoke had a busy 2021 summer transfer window with the permanent departure of 13 players. This enabled O'Neill to add to his squad with the arrivals of Jack Bonham, Romaine Sawyers, Sam Surridge, Mario Vrančić and Ben Wilmot. Stoke made a positive start to the season and were just outside the play-off places at the turn of the year. However a poor second half of the season saw Stoke drop down into mid-table and again finish in 14th position. Stoke made a poor start to the 2022–23 season, with one win from five games. O'Neill was dismissed by the club on 25 August 2022.

=== Return to Northern Ireland ===
On 7 December 2022, O'Neill returned for a second spell as Northern Ireland manager on a five-and-a-half-year contract. In May 2026, it was announced that he had signed a four‑year contract extension, keeping him in the role until 2032.

In November 2026, Northern Ireland finished top of 2026–27 UEFA Nations League B Group 2 of the 2026–27 UEFA Nations League to secure promotion to 2028–29 UEFA Nations League A.

=== Blackburn Rovers ===
On 13 February 2026, O'Neill returned to the EFL Championship after being appointed manager of Blackburn Rovers on a job share deal with the Irish FA, lasting until the end of the 2025–26 season. O'Neill took to the dugout the following day in a 3–1 win over Queens Park Rangers, however preparation for the match and team selection had been overseen by Damien Johnson. On 22 April, after 14 matches in charge, O'Neill secured Rovers’ Championship status with a 3–1 win over Sheffield United, having recorded five wins and five draws. In May 2026, he left his role as interim manager at Blackburn to focus on his role as Northern Ireland head coach.

== Personal life ==
Following Northern Ireland's performance at UEFA Euro 2016, O'Neill was appointed a Member of the Order of the British Empire (MBE) in the 2017 New Year Honours, "for services to football and the community in Northern Ireland." In April 2022, O'Neill underwent hip replacement surgery.

== Career statistics ==
=== Club ===
Appearances and goals by club, season and competition
Club	Season	League			National cup		League cup		Other		Total	
Club	Season	Division	Apps	Goals	Apps	Goals	Apps	Goals	Apps	Goals	Apps	Goals
Newcastle United	1987–88	First Division	21	12	3	1	0	0	2 (Note: Appearances in Full Members' Cup)	0	26	13
Newcastle United	1988–89	First Division	27	3	2	0	2	0	1 (Note: Appearances in Football League Centenary Trophy)	1	32	4
Newcastle United	Total		48	15	5	1	2	0	3	1	58	17
Dundee United	1989–90	Scottish Premier Division	18	5	1	0	2	1	4 (Note: Appearances in UEFA Cup)	1	25	7
Dundee United	1990–91	Scottish Premier Division	13	0	2	0	2	0	1	0	18	0
Dundee United	1991–92	Scottish Premier Division	8	4	0	0	2	1	0	0	10	5
Dundee United	1992–93	Scottish Premier Division	25	2	0	0	0	0	0	0	25	2
Dundee United	Total		64	11	3	0	6	2	5	1	78	14
Hibernian	1993–94	Scottish Premier Division	36	3	2	1	4	0	0	0	42	4
Hibernian	1994–95	Scottish Premier Division	33	10	3	1	3	3	0	0	39	14
Hibernian	1995–96	Scottish Premier Division	29	6	1	0	2	0	0	0	32	6
Hibernian	Total		98	19	6	2	9	3	0	0	113	24
Coventry City	1996–97	Premier League	1	0	0	0	0	0	0	0	1	0
Coventry City	1997–98	Premier League	4	0	0	0	1	0	0	0	5	0
Coventry City	Total		5	0	0	0	1	0	0	0	6	0
Aberdeen (loan)	1997–98	Scottish Premier League	6	0	0	0	0	0	0	0	6	0
Reading (loan)	1997–98	First Division	9	1	0	0	0	0	0	0	9	1
Wigan Athletic	1998–99	Second Division	36	0	3	0	1	0	7 (Note: Six appearances in Football League Trophy and one in Second Division play-offs)	3	47	3
Wigan Athletic	1999–2000	Second Division	30	2	4	0	4	0	1 (Note: appearance in Football League Trophy)	0	38	2
Wigan Athletic	Total		66	2	7	0	5	0	8	3	86	5
St Johnstone	2000–01	Scottish Premier League	9	0	1	0	1	0	0	0	11	0
Portland Timbers	2001	USL A-League	22	5	0	0	0	0	0	0	22	5
Clydebank	2001–02	Scottish Second Division	19	4	0	0	0	0	0	0	19	4
Glentoran	2002–03	Irish League	32	4	0	0	0	0	0	0	32	4
Glentoran	2003–04	Irish Premier League	9	0	0	0	0	0	0	0	9	0
Glentoran	Total		41	4	0	0	0	0	0	0	41	4
Ayr United	2004–05	Scottish Second Division	2	0	0	0	0	0	0	0	2	0
Career total			389	61	22	3	24	5	16	5	451	74

=== International ===
Appearances and goals by national team and year
National team	Year	Apps	Goals
Northern Ireland	1988	7	0
Northern Ireland	1989	5	1
Northern Ireland	1990	1	0
Northern Ireland	1991	1	0
Northern Ireland	1992	3	0
Northern Ireland	1993	5	0
Northern Ireland	1994	3	0
Northern Ireland	1995	2	3
Northern Ireland	1996	4	0
Total		31	4

Scores and results list Northern Ireland's goal tally first. The score column indicates the score after each O'Neill goal.

List of international goals scored by Micheal O'Neill
No.	Date	Venue	Opponent	Score	Result	Competition	Ref.
1	26 April 1989	National Stadium, Ta' Qali, Malta	Malta	2-0	2-0	1990 FIFA World Cup qualification	
2	11 October 1995	Sportpark Eschen-Mauren, Eschen, Liechtenstein	Liechtenstein	1-0	4-0	UEFA Euro 1996 qualification	
3	15 November 1995	Windsor Park, Belfast, Northern Ireland	Austria	1-0	5-3	UEFA Euro 1996 qualification	
4	15 November 1995	Windsor Park, Belfast, Northern Ireland	Austria	5-2	5-3	UEFA Euro 1996 qualification	

== Managerial statistics ==
As of match played 17 November 2026

Managerial record by team and tenure
Team	From	To	Record					Ref.
Team	From	To	P	W	D	L	Win %	Ref.
Brechin City	4 April 2006	13 December 2008	114	49	31	34	43.0	
Shamrock Rovers	15 December 2008	28 December 2011	151	83	32	36	55.0	
Northern Ireland	28 December 2011	22 April 2020	72	26	18	28	36.1	
Stoke City	8 November 2019	25 August 2022	143	55	35	53	38.5	
Northern Ireland	7 December 2022	Present	40	16	8	16	40.0	
Blackburn Rovers	13 February 2026	2 May 2026	15	5	5	5	33.3	
Total			535	234	129	172	43.7	

== Honours ==
=== Player ===
Wigan Athletic

- Football League Trophy: 1998–99

Glentoran

- Irish League Premier Division: 2002–03
- Irish League Cup: 2002–03
- County Antrim Shield: 2003

=== Manager ===
Shamrock Rovers

- League of Ireland Premier Division: 2010, 2011
- Setanta Sports Cup: 2011

=== Individual ===
- SWAI Personality of the Year: 2011
- Philips Sports Manager of the Year: 2015 (joint winner)
- BBC Sports Personality of the Year Coach Award: 2015
- Scottish Football League Second Division Manager of the Month: December 2007, October 2008

=== Decorations ===
- Member of the Order of the British Empire: 2017
