= José Luis Pochettino =

Argentine footballer

Personal information
- Date of birth: July 29, 1965 (age 61)
- Place of birth: Las Perdices, Argentina
- Position: Striker

Youth career
- 1982: San Lorenzo Las Perdices

Senior career*
Years	Team	Apps	(Gls)
1983–1990	Talleres		
1991–1992	Cobras Ciudad Juárez		
1992	Dundee United F.C.	2	(0)
1993–1994	Deportivo Español	33	(3)
1994–1995	Douglas Haig		
1995–1996	Tigre		
1996–1997	Sportivo Italiano		
1997–1998	Aldosivi		
- * Club domestic league appearances and goals

José Luis Pochettino (Italian: [poketˈtiːno]; born July 29, 1965, in Las Perdices, Córdoba) is a retired Argentine footballer, who played as a striker.

== Football career ==
During his early career, Pochettino played for hometown's Talleres de Córdoba. In 1991, aged 26, he had his first and only abroad experience, with Mexico's Cobras de Ciudad Juárez, returning after one year to his country and joining Deportivo Español, after an unsuccessful trial with Dundee United in Scotland.

In 1994, and during the following four years, Pochettino played one season apiece with second division outfits - the highest professional competition he knew in his country - Club Atlético Douglas Haig, Club Atlético Tigre, Sportivo Italiano and Club Atlético Aldosivi, retiring at the age of 33.
