= Victor Ferreyra =

Argentine footballer

Personal information
- Full name: Victor Hugo Ferreyra
- Date of birth: 24 February 1964 (age 62)
- Place of birth: Río Tercero, Argentina
- Height: 1.82 m (6 ft 0 in)
- Position: Striker

Senior career*
Years	Team	Apps	(Gls)
1984–1988	Racing Córdoba		
1988–1991	San Lorenzo Almagro		
1991–1993	Dundee United	30	(5)
1993	Urawa Reds	4	(0)
1993–1994	Belgrano	18	(4)
1994	Estudiantes	10	(3)
1994–1995	Talleres de Córdoba	13	(2)
1995–1996	Argentinos Juniors	12	(2)
1997–1998	Douglas Haig		

International career
1991	Argentina	2	(1)
- * Club domestic league appearances and goals

Victor Hugo Ferreyra (born 24 February 1964 in Río Tercero) is an Argentine former footballer who played as a striker. He played for a number of clubs in Argentina including San Lorenzo and also Dundee United in Scotland. He also made two appearances for Argentina in 1991.

His time in Scotland was controversial due to his spitting on Jim Duffy in a game against Dundee F.C.

Ferreyra's other clubs included Racing de Córdoba, Belgrano de Córdoba, Estudiantes, Talleres de Córdoba, Argentinos Juniors and Douglas Haig

== Club statistics ==
Club performance			League		Cup		League Cup		Total	
Season	Club	League	Apps	Goals	Apps	Goals	Apps	Goals	Apps	Goals
Scotland			League		Scottish Cup		League Cup		Total	
1991/92	Dundee United	Premier Division	23	5					23	5
1992/93	Dundee United	Premier Division	7	0					7	0
Japan			League		Emperor's Cup		J.League Cup		Total	
1993	Urawa Reds	J1 League	4	0	0	0	0	0	4	0
Country	Scotland		30	5					30	5
Country	Japan		4	0	0	0	0	0	4	0
Total			34	5	0	0	0	0	34	5

== National team statistics ==
Argentina national team
Year	Apps	Goals
1991	2	1
Total	2	1
