= Fred van der Hoorn =

Dutch association football player

Freddy van der Hoorn
Personal information
- Full name: Fred van der Hoorn
- Date of birth: 12 October 1963 (age 63)
- Place of birth: 's-Hertogenbosch, Netherlands
- Position: Defender

Youth career
- -1981: BVV
- 1981-1984: Den Bosch

Senior career*
Years	Team	Apps	(Gls)
1984–1989	Den Bosch	123	(4)
1989–1994	Dundee United	164	(4)
1994–1996	Eendracht Aalst	73	(1)
1996–2002	Den Bosch	169	(11)
Total		529	(20)

International career
1990	Scottish League XI	1	(0)

Managerial career
- 2005: Den Bosch (interim)
- 2009: Den Bosch (interim)
- * Club domestic league appearances and goals

Fred van der Hoorn (born 12 October 1963) is a Dutch retired footballer who played in defence.

== Career ==
Born in 's-Hertogenbosch, Van der Hoorn played the large part of his career at hometown club FC Den Bosch for whom he would play 330 official games in 11 seasons. He was snapped up by them as an 18-year old from city rivals BVV. His infamous tackle on Danny Hesp in 1988 almost ended the career of the talented Ajax defender. In 1989 he was suspended for four matches for an on-field fight with Utrecht midfielder Rob Alflen.

He moved abroad and joined Dundee United in 1989 and stayed at Tannadice until just after United's Scottish Cup win in 1994, although he had fallen out of favour by that time. In June 1994, he moved to Belgium with Eendracht Aalst and later returned to former club Den Bosch in 1996.

After retiring in 2002, van der Hoorn stayed with the club in a coaching capacity, becoming caretaker manager for two short spells in 2005 and in 2009. He also worked for the club as general manager and technical manager. Since 2017, he has his own player agency bureau.
