= Alan Main =

Scottish footballer (born 1967)

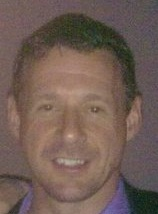
- Main in 2009

Personal information
- Full name: Alan David Main
- Date of birth: 5 December 1967 (age 58)
- Place of birth: Elgin, Scotland
- Height: 6 ft 0 in (1.83 m)
- Position: Goalkeeper

Team information
- Current team: Dunfermline Athletic (goalkeeping coach)

Youth career
- Elgin Boys Club

Senior career*
Years	Team	Apps	(Gls)
- Lossiemouth
- Elgin City
1986–1995	Dundee United	152	(0)
1988	→ Cowdenbeath (loan)	3	(0)
1988	→ East Stirlingshire (loan)	2	(0)
1995–2003	St Johnstone	233	(0)
2003–2004	Livingston	15	(0)
2004–2007	Gretna	61	(0)
2007–2010	St Johnstone	75	(0)
2010	→ Ayr United (trial)	3	(0)
Total		544	(0)

International career
1988–1989	Scotland under-21	3	(0)
1998	Scotland B	1	(0)
- * Club domestic league appearances and goals

Alan David Main (born 5 December 1967) is a Scottish former footballer who played as a goalkeeper. He is currently goalkeeping coach at Dunfermline Athletic.

Main began his senior football career in the Highland League, for whom he made his debut as a 15-year-old for his hometown team Lossiemouth, transferring to Elgin City during the 1986–87 season.

Main then transferred to top-tier Dundee United, signing a full-time contract, and remained with the club for nine years. He also played for St Johnstone, Livingston and Gretna in a twenty-year full-time professional career. In addition, Main appeared for Cowdenbeath and East Stirlingshire on loan and Ayr United as a trialist. He began his second spell with St Johnstone in 2007, and during the 2008–9 season helped them win promotion to the Scottish Premier League as well as breaking the club's all-time appearance record.

He won the Scottish League Cup with Livingston in 2004 and three Scottish Football League divisional medals. He also earned runners-up medals from the Scottish Cup and the UEFA Cup, having been part of the Dundee United squad that reached the 1987 final of the latter during his first professional season.

Despite having been called up the Scotland squad, Main was never capped at full international level. He did however represent Scotland in under-21 and B international fixtures.

== Early life ==
Alan Main was born in Elgin, Morayshire, on 5 December 1967 and grew up in nearby Lossiemouth, the youngest of four children. His father, Louis, played in the Highland Football League for Forres Mechanics. Alan and both of his brothers would also go on to play in the Highland League. Main played as a goalkeeper from an early age with Elgin Boys Club. He had the opportunity to sign for Motherwell on schoolboy forms, but turned the offer down due to the distance from his family home.

== Career ==
Main began his professional career with Lossiemouth his local club Highland League Club before transferring to neighbours and fellow Highland Club, Elgin City. From Elgin City he was transferred to Dundee United, making his début as a nineteen-year-old. He spent nine years at Tannadice, mostly under manager Jim McLean, even making Andy Roxburgh's Scotland squad. Due to make his début against Malta, he hurt his back and required an operation that kept him out of action for nine months.

Main signed for Dundee United's Tayside rivals St Johnstone in 1995 for £150,000 as competition for Saints' then first-choice goalkeeper Andy Rhodes. Known for his long kicks and dribbling skills outside his box, Main signed a three-year deal with the Perth club in 1997 and was again called up to the Scotland squad (this time by Craig Brown) not long afterwards. He made the substitutes' bench twice, but with Jim Leighton and Andy Goram ahead of him in the pecking order, he never took to the field.

Main broke his shin in a September 2001 game against Motherwell and was out of the game for over a year, missing Saints' relegation to the First Division. Main returned to first-team action in October 2002, despite Kevin Cuthbert – Main's deputy – having just won the First Division Player of the Month award. Four months after returning to first-team football, Main ended his nine-year association with the Perth club and returned to the Premier League with Livingston.

In February 2004, Main was one of a number of players affected by financial problems at Livingston and was asked to take a pay cut to remain at the club. Within days, Celtic indicated their interest in signing Main. Along with the other five players asked to accept reduced terms, Main agreed to remain at Livingston for the remainder of the season.

Following the beginning of the 2004–05 season, Main joined Scottish Third Division side Gretna on a three-year deal and went on to feature in each of their consecutive championship wins, culminating in promotion to the Scottish Premier League. Main guested for Shamrock Rovers in a friendly against Hibernian in July 2005. On 6 March 2007, two months before Gretna's promotion to the top flight, it was announced that Main had signed a pre-contract agreement with his former club St Johnstone on a two-year deal.

Despite turning 41 in 2008, Main was still the number-one keeper for St Johnstone going into 2009. In April 2009, he overtook Drew Rutherford to become the player with the most appearances for the club. He also signed a one-year contract extension until May 2010, making him a part of the squad promoted back to the Scottish Premier League for the first time in seven years. At 42, Main was the oldest registered player in the Scottish Premier League during the 2009–10 season.

Main started in the first nine SPL games of the 2009–10 season before being edged out by former Kilmarnock and Rangers goalkeeper Graeme Smith, who had missed the early part of the season due to an injury sustained in a pre-season match. During this run in the team Main saved a Derek Riordan penalty in a 3–1 win over Hibernian in the Scottish League Cup. Main remained on the substitutes' bench after Smith made his way into the starting line-up, and was released by St Johnstone at the end of the 2009–10 season, having become the player with the most appearances for the club (361). This record was broken by Steven Anderson in 2016.

In recognition of his achievements and services to St Johnstone over his two spells at the club, a series of events were planned for throughout 2010 as part of Main's testimonial year. These events included a race night and also a hosted dinner. Main was also granted a testimonial match against a Manchester United XI, which was played at McDiarmid Park on 31 July 2010.

On 21 August 2010, Main appeared as a trialist goalkeeper for Ayr United and kept a clean sheet in their 1–0 victory over Dumbarton. At 42 years 259 days old, he became the oldest player ever to play for Ayr United. However, after making two further league appearances against Peterhead and Alloa Athletic, a permanent contract did not come to fruition. Main joined Rangers in January 2011 as temporary cover for goalkeeping coach Jim Stewart, who was undergoing knee surgery. Main stayed in this position until 3 March. He officially announced his retirement as a player on 26 March 2011.

Main was inducted into Dundee United's Hall of Fame in 2013.

As of October 2014, Main was living in his native Elgin and was the goalkeeping coach at Forres Mechanics, while also working offshore.

In June 2022, Main was appointed first-team goalkeeping coach at Dunfermline Athletic, joining James McPake's backroom team.

== Honours ==
St. Johnstone

- Scottish First Division: 1996–97, 2008–09
- Challenge Cup: 2007–08

Livingston

- League Cup: 2003–04

Gretna

- Scottish Second Division: 2005–06
- Scottish First Division: 2006–07

== Personal life ==
Main's son, Nicky, was also a footballer. His career was cut short, at age 18, due to a brain tumour. He was given the all-clear in 2012.

== See also ==
- List of footballers in Scotland by number of league appearances (500+)
