= 1991–92 in Scottish football =

Premier Division champions
- Rangers

Division One champions
- Dundee

Division Two champions
- Dumbarton

Scottish Cup winners
- Rangers

League Cup winners
- Hibernian

Challenge Cup winners
- Hamilton Academical

Junior Cup winners
- Auchinleck Talbot

Teams in Europe
- Aberdeen, Celtic, Motherwell, Rangers

Scotland national team
- UEFA Euro 1992 qualifying, UEFA Euro 1992
- ← 1990–91 1992–93 →

The 1991–92 season was the 95th season of competitive football in Scotland.

== Scottish Premier Division ==
Pos	Team	Pld	W	D	L	GF	GA	GD	Pts	Qualification or relegation
1	Rangers (C)	44	33	6	5	101	31	+70	72	Qualification for the Champions League first round
2	Heart of Midlothian	44	27	9	8	60	37	+23	63	Qualification for the UEFA Cup first round
3	Celtic	44	26	10	8	88	42	+46	62	Qualification for the UEFA Cup first round
4	Dundee United	44	19	13	12	66	50	+16	51	
5	Hibernian	44	16	17	11	53	45	+8	49	Qualification for the UEFA Cup first round
6	Aberdeen	44	17	14	13	55	42	+13	48	
7	Airdrieonians	44	13	10	21	50	70	−20	36	Qualification for the Cup Winners' Cup first round
8	St Johnstone	44	13	10	21	52	73	−21	36	
9	Falkirk	44	12	11	21	54	73	−19	35	
10	Motherwell	44	10	14	20	43	61	−18	34	
11	St Mirren (R)	44	6	12	26	33	73	−40	24	Relegation to the 1992–93 Scottish First Division
12	Dunfermline Athletic (R)	44	4	10	30	22	80	−58	18	Relegation to the 1992–93 Scottish First Division

Rules for classification: 1) points; 2) goal difference; 3) number of goals scored.
(C) Champions; (R) Relegated

Champions: Rangers
Relegated: St Mirren, Dunfermline Athletic

== Scottish League Division One ==
Pos	Team	Pld	W	D	L	GF	GA	GD	Pts	Promotion or relegation
1	Dundee (C, P)	44	23	12	9	80	48	+32	58	Promotion to the Premier Division
2	Partick Thistle (P)	44	23	11	10	62	36	+26	57	Promotion to the Premier Division
3	Hamilton Academical	44	22	13	9	72	48	+24	57	
4	Kilmarnock	44	21	12	11	59	37	+22	54	
5	Raith Rovers	44	21	11	12	59	42	+17	53	
6	Ayr United	44	18	11	15	63	55	+8	47	
7	Morton	44	17	12	15	66	59	+7	46	
8	Stirling Albion	44	14	13	17	50	57	−7	41	
9	Clydebank	44	12	12	20	59	77	−18	36	
10	Meadowbank Thistle	44	7	16	21	37	59	−22	30	
11	Montrose (R)	44	5	17	22	45	85	−40	27	Relegation to the Second Division
12	Forfar Athletic (R)	44	5	12	27	36	85	−49	22	Relegation to the Second Division

Source: RSSSF and statto
Rules for classification: 1) points; 2) goal difference; 3) number of goals scored.
(C) Champions; (P) Promoted; (R) Relegated

Promoted: Dundee, Partick Thistle
Relegated: Montrose, Forfar Athletic

== Scottish League Division Two ==
Pos	Team	Pld	W	D	L	GF	GA	GD	Pts	Promotion
1	Dumbarton (C, P)	39	20	12	7	65	37	+28	52	Promotion to the First Division
2	Cowdenbeath (P)	39	22	7	10	74	52	+22	51	Promotion to the First Division
3	Alloa Athletic	39	20	10	9	58	38	+20	50	
4	East Fife	39	19	11	9	72	57	+15	49	
5	Clyde	39	18	7	14	61	43	+18	43	
6	East Stirlingshire	39	15	11	13	61	70	−9	41	
7	Arbroath	39	12	14	13	49	48	+1	38	
8	Brechin City	39	13	12	14	54	55	−1	38	
9	Queen's Park	39	14	7	18	59	63	−4	35	
10	Stranraer	39	13	9	17	46	56	−10	35	
11	Queen of the South	39	14	5	20	71	86	−15	33	
12	Berwick Rangers	39	10	11	18	50	65	−15	31	
13	Stenhousemuir	39	11	8	20	46	57	−11	30	
14	Albion Rovers	39	5	10	24	42	81	−39	20	

Source: "1991-1992 Second Division - SPFL Archive". SPFL.
Rules for classification: 1) points; 2) goal difference; 3) number of goals scored.
(C) Champions; (P) Promoted

Promoted: Dumbarton, Cowdenbeath

== Other honours ==
=== Cup honours ===
Competition	Winner	Score	Runner-up
Scottish Cup 1991–92	Rangers	2 – 1	Airdrieonians
League Cup 1991–92	Hibernian	2 – 0	Dunfermline Athletic
Challenge Cup 1991–92	Hamilton Academical	1 – 0	Ayr United
Youth Cup	Hibernian	2 – 0	Ayr United
Junior Cup	Auchinleck Talbot	4 – 0	Glenafton Athletic

=== Individual honours ===
==== SPFA awards ====
Award	Winner	Club
Players' Player of the Year	(Scotland) Ally McCoist	Rangers
Young Player of the Year	(Scotland) Phil O'Donnell	Motherwell

==== SFWA awards ====
Award	Winner	Club
Footballer of the Year	(Scotland) Ally McCoist	Rangers
Manager of the year	(Scotland) Walter Smith	Rangers

== Scottish clubs in Europe ==
Club	Competition(s)	Final round	Coef.
Rangers	European Cup	First round	2.00
Motherwell	UEFA Cup Winners' Cup	First round	2.00
Celtic	UEFA Europa League	Second round	5.00
Aberdeen	UEFA Europa League	First round	0.00

Average coefficient – 2.250

== Scotland national team ==
Date	Venue	Opponents	Score	Competition	Scotland scorer(s)
11 September 1991	Wankdorf Stadion, Bern (A)	Switzerland	2–2	ECQ2	Gordon Durie, Ally McCoist
16 October 1991	Steaua Stadium, Bucharest (A)	Romania	0–1	ECQ2	
13 November 1991	Hampden Park, Glasgow (H)	San Marino	4–0	ECQ2	Paul McStay, Ally McCoist, Richard Gough, Gordon Durie
19 February 1992	Hampden Park, Glasgow (H)	Northern Ireland	1–0	Friendly	Ally McCoist
25 March 1992	Hampden Park, Glasgow (H)	Finland	1–1	Friendly	Paul McStay
17 May 1992	Mile High Stadium, Denver (A)	(United States) USA	1–0	Friendly	Pat Nevin
20 May 1992	Varsity Stadium, Toronto (A)	Canada	3–1	Friendly	Gary McAllister, Ally McCoist, Maurice Malpas
3 June 1992	Ullevaal Stadion, Oslo (A)	Norway	0–0	Friendly	
12 June 1992	Ullevi Stadion, Gothenburg (N)	Netherlands	0–1	ECGB	
15 June 1992	Idrottsparken, Norrköping (N)	Germany	0–2	ECGB	
18 June 1992	Idrottsparken, Norrköping (N)	(Soviet Union) CIS	3–0	ECGB	Paul McStay, Brian McClair, Gary McAllister

Key:

- (H) = Home match
- (A) = Away match
- ECQG2 = European Championship qualifying – Group 2
- ECGB = European Championship – Group B

== See also ==
- 1991–92 Aberdeen F.C. season
- 1991–92 Dundee United F.C. season
- 1991–92 Rangers F.C. season
