= 1991–92 Hibernian F.C. season =

Hibernian
1991–92 season
- Manager: Alex Miller
- Scottish Premier Division: 5th
- Scottish Cup: R5
- Scottish League Cup: Winners
- Highest home attendance: 19,831 (v Hearts, 2 November)
- Lowest home attendance: 3254 (v Airdrieonians, 7 April)
- Average home league attendance: 9841 (up 584)

The 1991–92 season saw Hibernian compete in the Scottish Premier Division, in which they finished 5th. They also competed in the Scottish Cup and Scottish League Cup. They were knocked out in the fifth round of the Scottish Cup, but won the Scottish League Cup, defeating Dunfermline Athletic 2–0 in the final.

== Scottish Premier Division ==
Match Day	Date	Opponent	H/A	Score	Hibernian Scorer(s)	Attendance
1	10 August	St Mirren	H	4–1	Weir (2), McGinlay (2)	8,271
2	13 August	St Johnstone	H	2–1	Hamilton, McIntyre (pen.)	9,236
3	17 August	Motherwell	A	1–1	Wright	8,018
4	24 August	Dundee United	H	1–0	Weir	9,862
5	31 August	Heart of Midlothian	A	0–0		22,208
6	7 September	Airdrieonians	A	1–0	Weir	5,621
7	14 September	Falkirk	H	2–2	Weir, McGraw	8,800
8	21 September	Aberdeen	A	1–1	Weir	11,850
9	28 September	Celtic	H	1–1	McGinlay	18,021
10	5 October	Dunfermline Athletic	H	3–0	Hunter, Wright, McGinlay	7,602
11	8 October	Rangers	A	2–4	Weir, McGinlay	35,364
12	12 October	St Mirren	A	1–0	McIntyre	4,572
13	19 October	Motherwell	H	0–0		7,141
14	2 November	Heart of Midlothian	H	1–1	Wright	19,831
15	5 November	Airdrieonians	H	2–2	Wright, McIntyre (pen.)	6,622
16	9 November	Dundee United	A	1–1	Hunter	8,812
17	12 November	Falkirk	A	2–3	McGinlay (2)	5,512
18	16 November	Dunfermline Athletic	A	2–1	Wright, McGinlay	6,001
19	19 November	Rangers	H	0–3		16,833
20	23 November	Aberdeen	H	1–0	Lennon	8,942
21	30 November	St Johnstone	A	1–0	McIntyre	6,717
22	4 December	Celtic	A	0–0		22,340
23	7 December	St Mirren	H	0–0		6,943
24	14 December	Airdieonians	A	3–0	Weir, Hamilton, Evans	3,784
25	21 December	Falkirk	H	0–1		6,942
26	28 December	Dundee United	H	3–2	Wright, Evans(2)	7,688
27	1 January	Heart of Midlothian	A	1–1	McIntyre (pen.)	20,358
28	4 January	Dunfermline Athletic	H	5–0	Wright (3), Weir, Evans	7,644
29	11 January	Rangers	A	0–2		40,616
30	18 January	St Johnstone	H	0–1		7,107
31	1 February	Motherwell	A	1–1	Tortolano	6,105
32	8 February	Aberdeen	A	1–0	Weir	9,568
33	22 February	Celtic	H	0–2		7,029
34	29 February	Dunfermline Athletic	A	0–0		4,960
35	10 March	Rangers	H	1–3	Evans	13,387
36	14 March	Dundee United	A	0–1		5,588
37	21 March	Heart of Midlothian	H	1–2	Weir	14,429
38	28 March	St Mirren	A	1–0	Evans	1,918
39	4 April	Motherwell	H	0–0		4,423
40	7 April	Airdrieonians	H	0–2		3,254
41	11 April	Falkirk	A	3–2	McIntyre, Hamilton, Donald	3,943
42	18 April	Aberdeen	H	1–1	Donald	6,777
43	25 April	St Johnstone	A	1–1	Donald	3,895
44	2 May	Celtic	A	2–1	McGinlay, O.G.	25,532

=== Final League table ===
Pos	Team	Pld	W	D	L	GF	GA	GD	Pts	Qualification or relegation
3	Celtic	44	26	10	8	88	42	+46	62	Qualification for the UEFA Cup first round
4	Dundee United	44	19	13	12	66	50	+16	51	
5	Hibernian	44	16	17	11	53	45	+8	49	Qualification for the UEFA Cup first round
6	Aberdeen	44	17	14	13	55	42	+13	48	
7	Airdrieonians	44	13	10	21	50	70	−20	36	Qualification for the Cup Winners' Cup first round

Rules for classification: 1) points; 2) goal difference; 3) number of goals scored.

=== Scottish League Cup ===
Round	Date	Opponent	H/A	Score	Hibernian Scorer(s)	Attendance
R2	20 August	Stirling Albion	A	3–0	Wright, McIntyre, Evans	3,342
R3	28 August	Kilmarnock	A	3–2	Wright, McGinlay, MacLeod	6,507
R4	28 August	Ayr United	A	2–0	Wright, McGinlay	8,730
SF	25 September	Rangers	N	1–0	Wright	40,901
F	27 October	Dunfermline Athletic	N	2–0	McIntyre (pen.), Wright	40,377

=== Scottish Cup ===
Round	Date	Opponent	H/A	Score	Hibernian Scorer(s)	Attendance
R3	25 January	Partick Thistle	H	2–0	Wright (2)	11,998
R4	15 February	Clydebank	A	5–1	McIntyre, Wright, Weir, McGinlay, Evans	7,350
R5	7 March	Airdrieonians	H	0–2		11,000

== See also ==
- List of Hibernian F.C. seasons
