= 1992–93 Hibernian F.C. season =

Hibernian
1992–93 season
- Manager: Alex Miller
- Scottish Premier Division: 7th
- Scottish Cup: R4
- Scottish League Cup: Finalists
- UEFA Cup: R1
- Highest home attendance: 18,505 (v Hearts, 30 October)
- Lowest home attendance: 4996 (v St Johnstone, 30 November)
- Average home league attendance: 9732 (up 942)

Season 1992–93

== Scottish Premier Division ==
Match Day	Date	Opponent	H/A	Score	Hibernian Scorer(s)	Attendance
1	1 August	Aberdeen	A	0–3		12,503
2	4 August	Motherwell	A	2–1	Wright, McGinlay	5,391
3	8 August	Rangers	H	0–0		17,237
4	15 August	Falkirk	A	1–2	Tortolano	6,024
5	22 August	Heart of Midlothian	H	0–0		15,937
6	29 August	St Johnstone	A	1–1	McIntyre	6,017
7	2 September	Dundee United	H	2–1	Jackson, Tortolano	7,721
8	12 September	Celtic	A	3–2	Wright, Jackson, Evans	28,139
9	19 September	Airdrieonians	H	2–2	Weir (2)	6,909
10	26 September	Dundee	H	0–0		7,290
11	3 October	Partick Thistle	A	2–2	Weir, Jackson	6,332
12	7 October	Aberdeen	H	1–3	Wright	8,824
13	17 October	Rangers	A	0–1		40,978
14	24 October	St Johnstone	H	3–1	Jackson (2), Weir	5,988
15	31 October	Dundee United	A	0–1		6,955
16	7 November	Heart of Midlothian	A	0–1		17,342
17	14 November	Falkirk	H	3–1	Evans, Tortolano, Hamilton	7,237
18	21 November	Airdrieonians	A	0–2		3,129
19	28 November	Celtic	H	1–2	Jackson	12,985
20	1 December	Motherwell	H	2–2	Wright, McGinlay	4,777
21	5 December	Dundee	A	1–1	Jackson	5,467
22	12 December	Partick Thistle	H	1–0	Jackson	6,067
23	19 December	Aberdeen	A	0–2		11,018
24	26 December	Falkirk	A	3–3	Fellenger (2), Evans	6,925
25	2 January	Heart of Midlothian	H	0–0		21,657
26	16 January	Dundee United	H	2–1	Jackson, Van der Hoorn (own goal)	5,518
27	23 January	St Johnstone	A	0–2		4,206
28	30 January	Rangers	H	3–4	McGinlay (2), Jackson	17,447
29	13 February	Motherwell	A	0–0		5,021
30	16 February	Partick Thistle	A	3–0	McGinlay (2), Weir	3,064
31	20 February	Dundee	H	1–3	McGinlay	5,668
32	27 February	Airdrieonians	H	3–1	Jackson (2), McGinlay	5,011
33	9 March	Aberdeen	H	1–2	McGinlay	7,031
34	13 March	Rangers	A	0–3		41,076
35	16 March	Celtic	A	1–2	Wright	12,178
36	20 March	Heart of Midlothian	A	0–1		13,740
37	27 March	Falkirk	H	1–1	Wright	5,168
38	6 April	St Johnstone	H	2–2	Wright, Evans	3,526
39	13 April	Dundee United	A	3–0	Wright (3)	5,167
40	17 April	Celtic	H	3–1	Wright, Evans, Jackson (pen)	11,132
41	20 April	Airdrieonians	A	1–3	McGinlay	2,585
42	1 May	Motherwell	H	1–0	Weir	4,779
43	8 May	Dundee	A	1–3	Evans	5,115
44	15 May	Partick Thistle	H	0–1		5,467

=== Final League table ===
Pos	Team	Pld	W	D	L	GF	GA	GD	Pts	Qualification or relegation
5	Heart of Midlothian	44	15	14	15	46	51	−5	44	Qualification for the UEFA Cup first round
6	St Johnstone	44	10	20	14	52	66	−14	40	
7	Hibernian	44	12	13	19	54	64	−10	37	
8	Partick Thistle	44	12	12	20	50	71	−21	36	
9	Motherwell	44	11	13	20	46	62	−16	35	

Source: RSSSF
Rules for classification: 1) points; 2) goal difference; 3) number of goals scored.

=== Scottish League Cup ===
Round	Date	Opponent	H/A	Score	Hibernian Scorer(s)	Attendance
R2	12 August	Raith Rovers	H	4–1	Evans (2), Hamilton, McGinlay	7,294
R3	19 August	Kilmarnock	A	1–3	Wright	7,495

=== UEFA Cup ===
Round	Date	Opponent	H/A	Score	Hibernian Scorer(s)	Attendance
R1 L1	15 September	(Belgium) Anderlecht	H	2–2	Beaumont, McGinlay	14,213
R1 L2	29 September	(Belgium) Anderlecht	A	1–1 (Anderlecht win on away goals)	Jackson	26,000

=== Scottish Cup ===
Round	Date	Opponent	H/A	Score	Hibernian Scorer(s)	Attendance
R3	9 January	St Mirren	H	5–2	Weir (2), Wright, Jackson, McGinlay	7,997
R4	6 February	Cowdenbeath	A	0–0		4,509
R4R	10 February	Cowdenbeath	H	1–0	McGinlay	8,701
R5	6 March	St Johnstone	H	2–0	Tweed, Wright	10,785
SF	3 April	Aberdeen	N	0–1		21,403

== See also ==
- List of Hibernian F.C. seasons
