= 1997–98 Hibernian F.C. season =

Hibernian
1997–98 season
- Manager: Jim Duffy (until 2 February); Alex McLeish (from 11 February)
- Premier Division: 10th (relegated)
- Scottish Cup: R3
- League Cup: R3
- Top goalscorer: League: Crawford, 9 All: Crawford, 9 Lavety, 9
- Highest home attendance: 15565
- Lowest home attendance: 9126
- Average home league attendance: 12025 (up 1464)

Season 1997–98 was an unqualified disaster for Hibs, as the club was relegated to the First Division by finishing bottom of the Premier Division. There was also disappointment in the cup competitions, as the club were beaten by First Division club Raith Rovers in the Scottish Cup, and Dundee United in the League Cup. Manager Jim Duffy was sacked and replaced by Alex McLeish midway through the season.

== League season ==
Hibs got off to a good start to the season, winning 2–1 against Celtic on the opening day, with Chic Charnley scoring a memorable winning goal. The season "rapidly turned into a nightmare", however. With the club four points adrift at the bottom of the league, manager Jim Duffy was sacked after a 6–2 defeat by Motherwell. Alex McLeish was hired as Duffy's replacement, but he was unable to save the club from relegation to the First Division.

=== Results ===
3 August 1997 Premier Division	Hibernian	2–1	Celtic	Easter Road, Edinburgh
	Power 24'; Charnley 75'		Mackay 29'	Attendance: 13,051

17 August 1997 Premier Division	Dundee United	1–1	Hibernian	Tannadice Park, Dundee
	Winters 22'		Tosh 77'	Attendance: 7,344

23 August 1997 Premier Division	Hibernian	4–0	Kilmarnock	Easter Road, Edinburgh
	Crawford 6'; Lavety 24'; Baker 64' (o.g.); McGinlay 90'			Attendance: 9,559

30 August 1997 Premier Division	Hibernian	0–1	Heart of Midlothian	Easter Road, Edinburgh
			McCann 7'	Attendance: 15,550

13 September 1997 Premier Division	Hibernian	5–2	Dunfermline Athletic	Easter Road, Edinburgh
	Charnley 25', 79'; Lavety 31'; Crawford 38'; McGinlay 55'		Millar 16' (pen.); Petrie 80'	Attendance: 10,070

20 September 1997 Premier Division	Motherwell	1–1	Hibernian	Fir Park, Motherwell
	Coyne 80'		Rougier 46'	Attendance: 7,420

27 September 1997 Premier Division	Hibernian	1–1	St Johnstone	Easter Road, Edinburgh
	Crawford 2'		Farquhar 16'	Attendance: 11,172

4 October 1997 Premier Division	Hibernian	3–4	Rangers	Easter Road, Edinburgh
	McGinlay 28'; Lavety 43'; Crawford 46'		Negri 26' (pen.), 58'; Gascoigne 51'; Albertz 52'	Attendance: 15,237

18 October 1997 Premier Division	Aberdeen	2–0	Hibernian	Pittodrie Stadium, Aberdeen
	Glass 5'; Dodds 37' (pen.)			Attendance: 11,708

25 October 1997 Premier Division	Kilmarnock	2–1	Hibernian	Rugby Park, Kilmarnock
	Roberts 54'; Nevin 57'		Larusson 80'	Attendance: 7,541

1 November 1997 Premier Division	Hibernian	1–3	Dundee United	Easter Road, Edinburgh
	Crawford 85'		Olofsson 26', 88'; McSwegan 90'	Attendance: 10,110

8 November 1997 Premier Division	Heart of Midlothian	2–0	Hibernian	Tynecastle Stadium, Edinburgh
	Robertson 17'; Quitongo 88'			Attendance: 16,739

15 November 1997 Premier Division	Dunfermline Athletic	2–1	Hibernian	East End Park, Dunfermline
	Smith 17', 81'		Crawford 90'	Attendance: 6,952

22 November 1997 Premier Division	St Johnstone	1–0	Hibernian	McDiarmid Park, Perth
	Scott 2'			Attendance: 5,403

29 November 1997 Premier Division	Hibernian	1–1	Motherwell	Easter Road, Edinburgh
	Dods 75'		Coyle 90'	Attendance: 9,999

7 December 1997 Premier Division	Rangers	1–0	Hibernian	Ibrox Stadium, Glasgow
	Negri 51'			Attendance: 48,070

13 December 1997 Premier Division	Hibernian	2–2	Aberdeen	Easter Road, Edinburgh
	Walker 2', 83'		Dodds 43'; Jess 68'	Attendance: 10,001

20 December 1997 Premier Division	Celtic	5–0	Hibernian	Celtic Park, Glasgow
	Burley 23', 90'; Wieghorst 38'; McNamara 48'; Larsson 64'			Attendance: 49,094

27 December 1997 Premier Division	Hibernian	0–1	Kilmarnock	Easter Road, Edinburgh
			Wright 43'	Attendance: 10,543

1 January 1998 Premier Division	Heart of Midlothian	2–2	Hibernian	Tynecastle Stadium, Edinburgh
	Fulton 6', 10'		Walker 51'; McGinlay 67'	Attendance: 17,564

10 January 1998 Premier Division	Hibernian	1–0	Dunfermline Athletic	Easter Road, Edinburgh
	McGinlay 36'			Attendance: 10,616

17 January 1998 Premier Division	Hibernian	0–1	St Johnstone	Easter Road, Edinburgh
			Grant 83'	Attendance: 9,126

31 January 1998 Premier Division	Motherwell	6–2	Hibernian	Fir Park, Motherwell
	Arnott 10'; Weir 23'; Garcin 43'; McCulloch 81', 89'; Coyne 88'		Crawford 4'; Lavety 8'	Attendance: 6,169

7 February 1998 Premier Division	Aberdeen	3–0	Hibernian	Pittodrie Stadium, Aberdeen
	Newell 40'; Jess 57'; Miller 59'			Attendance: 12,043

21 February 1998 Premier Division	Hibernian	1–2	Rangers	Easter Road, Edinburgh
	Lavety 19'		Negri 35'; Albertz 88'	Attendance: 13,968

24 February 1998 Premier Division	Dundee United	1–1	Hibernian	Tannadice Park, Dundee
	Dow 73' (o.g.)		Hughes 75'	Attendance: 7,989

28 February 1998 Premier Division	Hibernian	0–1	Celtic	Easter Road, Edinburgh
			Rieper 25'	Attendance: 15,137

14 March 1998 Premier Division	St Johnstone	1–1	Hibernian	McDiarmid Park, Perth
	McQuillan 62'		Rougier 90' (pen.)	Attendance: 6,472; Referee: McCluskey

21 March 1998 Premier Division	Hibernian	1–0	Motherwell	Easter Road, Edinburgh
	Lavety 34'			Attendance: 10,582

28 March 1998 Premier Division	Hibernian	1–1	Aberdeen	Easter Road, Edinburgh
	Rougier 90' (pen.)		Jess 68'	Attendance: 12,966

1 April 1998 Premier Division	Rangers	3–0	Hibernian	Ibrox Stadium, Glasgow
	McCoist 56'; Thern 58'; Durie 75'			Attendance: 48,488

11 April 1998 Premier Division	Hibernian	2–1	Heart of Midlothian	Easter Road, Edinburgh
	Lavety 56'; Harper 80'		Robertson 71'	Attendance: 16,200

18 April 1998 Premier Division	Dunfermline Athletic	1–1	Hibernian	East End Park, Dunfermline
	Brebner 48' (o.g.)		Welsh 90'	Attendance: 12,749

25 April 1998 Premier Division	Celtic	0–0	Hibernian	Celtic Park, Glasgow
				Attendance: 49,500

2 May 1998 Premier Division	Hibernian	1–2	Dundee United	Easter Road, Edinburgh
	Brebner 31'		Olofsson 72', 78'	Attendance: 13,413

9 May 1998 Premier Division	Kilmarnock	1–1	Hibernian	Rugby Park, Kilmarnock
	Roberts 15'		Crawford 90'	Attendance: 12,393

=== Final table ===
Pos	Team	Pld	W	D	L	GF	GA	GD	Pts	Qualification or relegation
6	Aberdeen	36	9	12	15	39	53	−14	39	
7	Dundee United	36	8	13	15	43	51	−8	37	
8	Dunfermline Athletic	36	8	13	15	43	68	−25	37	
9	Motherwell	36	9	7	20	46	64	−18	34	
10	Hibernian (R)	36	6	12	18	38	59	−21	30	Relegation to the First Division

Source: Rec.Sport.Soccer Statistics Foundation
Rules for classification: 1) Points; 2) Goal difference; 3) Goals scored
(R) Relegated

== Scottish League Cup ==
=== Results ===
9 August 1997 Scottish League Cup	Hibernian	3–1	Alloa Athletic	Easter Road, Edinburgh
	Lavety 9'; Charnley 29'; McGinlay 49'		Irvine 50'	Attendance: 6,807

20 August 1997 Scottish League Cup	Dundee United	2–1; AET	Hibernian	Tannadice Park, Dundee
	Zetterlund 90'; McSwegan 92'		Lavety 3'	Attendance: 7,692; Referee: McCluskey

== Scottish Cup ==
=== Results ===
24 January 1998 Scottish Cup	Hibernian	1–2	Raith Rovers	Easter Road, Edinburgh
	McGinlay 22'		Millar 10', 21'	Attendance: 11,481

== Transfers ==
=== Players in ===
Player	From	Fee
(Trinidad and Tobago) Tony Rougier	Raith Rovers	£250,000
(Benin) Jean-Marc Adjovi-Bocco	RC Lens	Free
(Iceland) Olafur Gottskalksson	Keflavik	£200,000
(Scotland) Stephen Crawford	Millwall	£360,000
(England) Justin Skinner	Bristol Rovers	Free

Latapy?

=== Players out ===
Player	To	Fee
(Scotland) Joe McLaughlin	Clydebank	Free
(Scotland) Graeme Love	Ayr United	Free
(Germany) Thorsten Schmugge		Free
(Scotland) Jim Leighton	Aberdeen	Free
(Scotland) Keith Wright	Raith Rovers	Free
(Scotland) Ian Cameron	Raith Rovers	Free
(Scotland) Darren Jackson	Celtic	£1,500,000
(Scotland) Chic Charnley	Partick Thistle	Free
(Scotland) Greg Miller	Livingston	Nominal fee
(Republic of Ireland) Lee Power	Ayr United	Free
(Scotland) Brian Grant	Dundee	Free

=== Loans in ===
Player	From
(Scotland) Andy Walker	Sheffield United
(Scotland) Bryan Gunn	Norwich City
(Scotland) Grant Brebner	Manchester United

=== Loans out ===
Player	To
(Scotland) John Martin	Berwick Rangers
(Scotland) Eric Paton	Stenhousemuir
(Scotland) Ian McDonald	Stenhousemuir

== Player stats ==
During the 1997–98 season, Hibs used 32 different players in competitive games. The table below shows the number of appearances and goals scored by each player.

No.	Pos	Nat	Player	Total		Premier Division		Scottish Cup		League Cup	
No.	Pos	Nat	Player	Apps	Goals	Apps	Goals	Apps	Goals	Apps	Goals
	GK	(Iceland) ISL	Olafur Gottskalksson	17	0	16	0	0	0	1	0
	GK	(Scotland) SCO	Bryan Gunn	12	0	12	0	0	0	0	0
	GK	(Scotland) SCO	Chris Reid	10	0	8	0	1	0	1	0
	DF	(Benin) BEN	Jean-Marc Adjovi-Bocco	32	0	29	0	1	0	2	0
	DF	(Scotland) SCO	Shaun Dennis	6	0	5	0	1	0	0	0
	DF	(Scotland) SCO	Darren Dods	32	1	29	1	1	0	2	0
	DF	(Scotland) SCO	David Elliot	4	0	4	0	0	0	0	0
	DF	(Scotland) SCO	John Hughes	27	1	25	1	0	0	2	0
	DF	(Scotland) SCO	Stuart McCaffrey	2	0	2	0	0	0	0	0
	DF	(Scotland) SCO	Jamie McQuilken	1	0	1	0	0	0	0	0
	DF	(Scotland) SCO	Willie Miller	34	0	31	0	1	0	2	0
	DF	(Scotland) SCO	Michael Renwick	6	0	6	0	0	0	0	0
	DF	(Scotland) SCO	Brian Welsh	17	1	17	1	0	0	0	0
	MF	(Scotland) SCO	Scott Bannerman	1	0	1	0	0	0	0	0
	MF	(Scotland) SCO	Grant Brebner	9	1	9	1	0	0	0	0
	MF	(Scotland) SCO	Chic Charnley	23	4	20	3	1	0	2	1
	MF	(Scotland) SCO	Graeme Donald	4	0	4	0	0	0	0	0
	MF	(Scotland) SCO	Andy Dow	35	0	32	0	1	0	2	0
	MF	(Scotland) SCO	Brian Grant	7	0	5	0	0	0	2	0
	MF	(Scotland) SCO	Kevin Harper	29	1	27	1	1	0	1	0
	MF	(Scotland) SCO	Chris Jackson	16	0	15	0	1	0	0	0
	MF	(Iceland) ISL	Bjarni Larusson	7	1	7	1	0	0	0	0
	MF	(Scotland) SCO	Pat McGinlay	36	6	33	4	1	1	2	1
	MF	(Scotland) SCO	Greg Miller	4	0	3	0	0	0	1	0
	MF	(Scotland) SCO	Eric Paton	1	0	0	0	0	0	1	0
	MF	(Trinidad and Tobago) TRI	Tony Rougier	31	3	30	3	0	0	1	0
	FW	(Scotland) SCO	Stephen Crawford	38	9	35	9	1	0	2	0
	FW	(Scotland) SCO	Barry Lavety	29	9	26	7	1	0	2	2
	FW	(Scotland) SCO	Kenny Miller	7	0	7	0	0	0	0	0
	FW	(Ireland) EIR	Lee Power	6	1	5	1	0	0	1	0
	FW	(Scotland) SCO	Paul Tosh	16	1	15	1	0	0	1	0
	FW	(Scotland) SCO	Andy Walker	9	3	8	3	1	0	0	0

== See also ==
- List of Hibernian F.C. seasons
