= 1993–94 Hibernian F.C. season =

Hibernian
1993–94 season
- Manager: Alex Miller
- Scottish Premier Division: 5th
- Scottish Cup: R4
- Scottish League Cup: Finalists
- Highest home attendance: 18,505 (v Hearts, 30 October)
- Lowest home attendance: 4996 (v St Johnstone, 30 November)
- Average home league attendance: 9732 (up 942)

Season 1993–94

== Scottish Premier Division ==
Match Day	Date	Opponent	H/A	Score	Hibernian Scorer(s)	Attendance
1	7 August	Partick Thistle	H	0–0		7,452
2	14 August	Celtic	A	1–1	Tweed	27,690
3	21 August	Heart of Midlothian	A	0–1		17,283
4	28 August	Dundee	H	2–0	Beaumont, McAllister	5,915
5	4 September	Kilmarnock	A	1–1	Evans	7,727
6	11 September	Aberdeen	H	2–1	McAllister, Wright	8,506
7	18 September	St Johnstone	A	3–1	McAllister, Wright, O'Neill	5,008
8	25 September	Rangers	A	1–2	Evans	43,200
9	2 October	Dundee United	H	2–0	Jackson (2)	7,556
10	5 October	Raith Rovers	A	3–2	McAllister, Jackson, O'Neill	9,197
11	9 October	Motherwell	A	2–0	Wright, Jackson	9,090
12	16 October	Celtic	H	1–1	Evans	14,991
13	30 October	Heart of Midlothian	H	0–2		18,505
14	2 November	Partick Thistle	A	0–0		3,815
15	6 November	Dundee	A	2–3	Wright, own goal	4,535
16	9 November	Kilmarnock	H	2–1	Tweed, Hunter	6,451
17	13 November	Dundee United	A	2–2	Hamilton, Jackson	6,880
18	20 November	Rangers	H	0–1		16,506
19	27 November	Aberdeen	A	0–4		12,334
20	30 November	St Johnstone	H	0–0		4,996
21	4 December	Raith Rovers	A	2–1	Wright, Findlay	4,407
22	11 December	Motherwell	H	3–2	Wright, Findlay, Mitchell	7,429
23	18 December	Celtic	A	0–1		16,808
24	27 December	Partick Thistle	H	5–1	Farrell, McAllister, Hamilton, Wright, Jackson	10,165
25	8 January	Dundee	H	2–0	McAllister, Tortolano	7,416
26	12 January	Heart of Midlothian	A	1–1	Wright	24,139
27	15 January	Kilmarnock	A	3–0	Farrell, Beaumont, Evans	7,357
28	22 January	St Johnstone	A	2–2	O'Neill (pen.), Jackson	6,466
29	5 February	Aberdeen	H	3–1	Wright (2), Lennon	9,556
30	12 February	Rangers	A	0–2		11,939
31	26 February	Dundee United	H	0–1		7,015
32	5 March	Raith Rovers	H	3–0	Wright (2), Findlay	6,042
33	12 March	Motherwell	A	0–0		7,126
34	19 March	Celtic	H	0–0		14,639
35	26 March	Partick Thistle	A	0–1		4,632
36	29 March	Aberdeen	A	3–2	Wright (2), Tweed	10,832
37	2 April	St Johnstone	H	0–0		6,628
38	16 April	Dundee United	A	0–3		6,603
39	23 April	Motherwell	H	0–2		6,137
40	26 April	Raith Rovers	A	1–1	Wright	3,040
41	30 April	Heart of Midlothian	H	0–0		14,213
42	3 May	Rangers	H	1–0	Wright	14,517
43	7 May	Dundee	A	0–4		2,731
44	14 May	Kilmarnock	H	0–0		9,971

=== Final League table ===
Pos	Team	Pld	W	D	L	GF	GA	GD	Pts	Qualification or relegation
3	Motherwell	44	20	14	10	58	43	+15	54	Qualification for the UEFA Cup preliminary round
4	Celtic	44	15	20	9	51	38	+13	50	
5	Hibernian	44	16	15	13	53	48	+5	47	
6	Dundee United	44	11	20	13	47	48	−1	42	Qualification for the Cup Winners' Cup first round
7	Heart of Midlothian	44	11	20	13	37	43	−6	42	

Source: RSSSF
Rules for classification: 1) points; 2) goal difference; 3) number of goals scored.

=== Scottish League Cup ===
Round	Date	Opponent	H/A	Score	Hibernian Scorer(s)	Attendance
R2	10 August	Alloa Athletic	H	2–0		
R3	24 August	Dundee	H	2–1		
QF	31 August	Partick Thistle	A	2–2 (aet, 3-2 penalties)		7,688
SF	21 September	Dundee United	N	1–0		19,024
F	24 October	Rangers	N	1–2	McPherson (own goal)	47,632

=== Scottish Cup ===
Round	Date	Opponent	H/A	Score	Hibernian Scorer(s)	Attendance
R3	29 January	Clyde	H	2–1		
R4	20 February	Heart of Midlothian	H	1–2		

== See also ==
- List of Hibernian F.C. seasons
