= 1994–95 Hibernian F.C. season =

Hibernian
1994–95 season
- Manager: Alex Miller
- Premier Division: 3rd
- Scottish Cup: SF
- League Cup: QF
- Highest home attendance: 13622 (v Hearts, 29 October)
- Lowest home attendance: 5395 (v Motherwell, 22 March)
- Average home league attendance: 8751 (down 981)

== Scottish Premier Division ==
Match Day	Date	Opponent	H/A	Score	Hibernian Scorer(s)	Attendance
1	13 August	Dundee United	H	5–0	Findlay, O'Neill, Jackson (2), Harper	8,238
2	20 August	Kilmarnock	H	0–0		9,107
3	27 August	Heart of Midlothian	A	1–0	Hunter	12,371
4	10 September	Aberdeen	H	2–2	O'Neill, Jackson	9,728
5	17 September	Motherwell	A	1–1	O'Neill	7,005
6	24 September	Celtic	A	0–2		28,170
7	1 October	Partick Thistle	H	3–0	Jackson, McGraw	7,083
8	8 October	Rangers	H	2–1	Hunter, Harper	12,088
9	15 October	Falkirk	A	0–0		7,338
10	22 October	Dundee United	A	0–0		7,983
11	29 October	Heart of Midlothian	H	2–1	Jackson, O'Neill	13,622
12	5 November	Kilmarnock	A	0–0		8,319
13	9 November	Aberdeen	A	0–0		10,882
14	19 November	Motherwell	H	2–2	McAllister, O'Neill	9,160
15	30 November	Celtic	H	1–1	Jackson	12,295
16	3 December	Partick Thistle	A	2–2	O'Neill, McGinlay	4,667
17	10 December	Falkirk	H	2–2	Jackson, O'Neill	7,725
18	26 December	Rangers	A	0–2		44,892
19	31 December	Dundee United	H	4–0	Wright (3), O'Neill	7,754
20	7 January	Kilmarnock	H	2–1	O'Neill, McGinlay	8,918
21	13 January	Motherwell	A	0–0		6,724
22	18 January	Heart of Midlothian	A	0–2		12,630
23	21 January	Aberdeen	H	4–2	Jackson (2, 1 pen.), Wright, McGinlay	8,076
24	4 February	Partick Thistle	H	1–2	McGinlay	7,760
25	11 February	Celtic	A	2–2	McGinlay, McGraw	24,284
26	25 February	Falkirk	A	0–1		6,501
27	4 March	Rangers	H	1–1	Wright	11,939
28	18 March	Aberdeen	A	0–0		10,384
29	22 March	Motherwell	H	2–0	Wright (2)	5,395
30	1 April	Partick Thistle	H	2–2	Harper, Wright	4,041
31	16 April	Rangers	A	1–3	O'Neill	44,193
32	19 April	Falkirk	H	0–2		5,450
33	29 April	Dundee United	A	1–0	McGinlay	8,376
34	6 May	Heart of Midlothian	H	3–1	Weir, Wright, Harper	7,122
35	10 May	Celtic	H	1–1	Harper	6,019
36	13 May	Kilmarnock	A	2–1	Wright, McGinlay	11,676

=== Final League table ===
Pos	Team	Pld	W	D	L	GF	GA	GD	Pts	Qualification or relegation
1	Rangers (C)	36	20	9	7	60	35	+25	69	Qualification for the Champions League qualifying round
2	Motherwell	36	14	12	10	50	50	0	54	Qualification for the UEFA Cup preliminary round
3	Hibernian	36	12	17	7	49	37	+12	53	
4	Celtic	36	11	18	7	39	33	+6	51	Qualification for the Cup Winners' Cup first round (Note: Celtic qualified for the 1995–96 UEFA Cup Winners' Cup by winning the 1994–95 Scottish Cup.)
5	Falkirk	36	12	12	12	48	47	+1	48	

Updated to match(es) played on end of season. Source: Soccerbase
Rules for classification: 1) Points; 2) Goal difference; 3) Goals scored
(C) Champions

=== Scottish League Cup ===
Round	Date	Opponent	H/A	Score	Hibernian Scorer(s)	Attendance
R2	17 August	Queen of the South	A	3–0	Tweed, Evans, O'Neill	
R3	30 August	Dunfermline Athletic	H	2–0	O'Neill (2)	
QF	21 September	Airdrieonians	H	1–2	Evans	

=== Scottish Cup ===
Round	Date	Opponent	H/A	Score	Hibernian Scorer(s)	Attendance
R3	28 January	Montrose	A	2–0	McGinlay, Jackson	
R4	18 February	Motherwell	H	2–0	McGinlay, Harper	
R5	11 March	Stenhousemuir	A	4–0	Harper (2), O'Neill, Harper	
SF	7 April	Celtic	N	0–0		40,950
SFR	11 April	Celtic	N	1–3	Wright	32,410

== See also ==
- List of Hibernian F.C. seasons
