= 1995–96 Hibernian F.C. season =

Hibernian
1995–96 season
- Manager: Alex Miller
- Premier Division: 5th
- Scottish Cup: R3
- League Cup: R3
- Top goalscorer: League: Darren Jackson (10); All: Darren Jackson (11)
- Highest home attendance: 14872 (v Hearts, 1 January)
- Lowest home attendance: 6841
- Average home league attendance: 9894 (up 1143)

Season 1995–96

== League season ==
=== Results ===
Win Draw Loss

26 August 1995 Premier Division	Partick Thistle	1–1	Hibernian	Firhill Stadium, Glasgow
			O'Neill	Attendance: 5,327

9 September 1995 Premier Division	Kilmarnock	0–3	Hibernian	Rugby Park, Kilmarnock
			Wright; Evans	Attendance: 7,014

16 September 1995 Premier Division	Hibernian	1–1	Aberdeen	Easter Road, Edinburgh
	Jackson			Attendance: 11,161

23 September 1995 Premier Division	Rangers	0–1	Hibernian	Ibrox Stadium, Glasgow
			Jackson pen.'	Attendance: 44,221

1 October 1995 Premier Division	Hibernian	2–2	Hearts	Easter Road
	Donald 61'; McGinlay 73'		McPherson 40'; Robertson 92'	Attendance: 12,374; Referee: Willie Young

4 October 1995 Premier Division	Raith Rovers	3–0	Hibernian	Stark's Park, Kirkcaldy
				Attendance: 6,051

7 October 1995 Premier Division	Hibernian	2–1	Falkirk	Easter Road, Edinburgh
	McAllister; Jackson			Attendance: 8,356

14 October 1995 Premier Division	Celtic	2–2	Hibernian	Celtic Park, Glasgow
			Harper; Jackson pen.'	Attendance: 31,738

21 October 1995 Premier Division	Hibernian	4–2	Motherwell	Easter Road, Edinburgh
	Jackson pen.' Wright; O'Neill			Attendance: 9,803

28 October 1995 Premier Division	Hibernian	2–0	Kilmarnock	Easter Road, Edinburgh
	Wright; O'Neill			Attendance: 9,888

4 November 1995 Premier Division	Aberdeen	1–2	Hibernian	Pittodrie Stadium, Aberdeen
			Wright; O'Neill	Attendance: 14,774

11 November 1995 Premier Division	Falkirk	2–0	Hibernian	Brockville Park, Falkirk
				Attendance: 6,046

19 November 1995 Premier Division	Hearts	2–1	Hibernian	Tynecastle Stadium
	Millar 31'; Robertson 55' (pen.)		C.Jackson 51'	Attendance: 12,074; Referee: Kenny Clark

22 November 1995 Premier Division	Hibernian	3–0	Partick Thistle	Easter Road, Edinburgh
	McAllister; Weir; Jackson			Attendance: 6,783

25 November 1995 Premier Division	Hibernian	1–4	Rangers	Easter Road, Edinburgh
	C.Jackson			Attendance: 13,558

2 December 1995 Premier Division	Motherwell	0–2	Hibernian	Fir Park, Motherwell
			Wright	Attendance: 5,362

9 December 1995 Premier Division	Hibernian	0–4	Celtic	Easter Road, Edinburgh
				Attendance: 13,626

16 December 1995 Premier Division	Hibernian	1–2	Raith Rovers	Easter Road, Edinburgh
	McGinlay			Attendance: 8,507

30 December 1995 Premier Division	Rangers	7–0	Hibernian	Ibrox Stadium, Glasgow
				Attendance: 44,692

1 January 1996 Premier Division	Hibernian	2–1	Hearts	Easter Road, Edinburgh
	O'Neill; Harper			Attendance: 14,872

8 January 1996 Premier Division	Hibernian	1–2	Aberdeen	Easter Road, Edinburgh
	Harper			Attendance: 8,191

13 January 1996 Premier Division	Kilmarnock	3–2	Hibernian	Rugby Park, Kilmarnock
			Wright; O'Neill	Attendance: 6,686

16 January 1996 Premier Division	Partick Thistle	0–0	Hibernian	Firhill Stadium, Glasgow
				Attendance: 2,811

20 January 1996 Premier Division	Hibernian	0–0	Motherwell	Easter Road, Edinburgh
				Attendance: 7,658

3 February 1996 Premier Division	Celtic	2–1	Hibernian	Celtic Park, Glasgow
			Jackson	Attendance: 36,976

10 February 1996 Premier Division	Raith Rovers	1–0	Hibernian	Stark's Park, Kirkcaldy
				Attendance: 4,832

24 February 1996 Premier Division	Hibernian	2–1	Falkirk	Easter Road, Edinburgh
	Wright; Evans			Attendance: 7,609

3 March 1996 Premier Division	Hibernian	0–2	Rangers	Easter Road, Edinburgh
				Attendance: 11,293

16 March 1996 Premier Division	Hearts	1–1	Hibernian	Tynecastle Stadium, Edinburgh
			Dow	Attendance: 14,923

23 March 1996 Premier Division	Aberdeen	2–1	Hibernian	Pittodrie Stadium, Aberdeen
			McAllister	Attendance: 10,924

30 March 1996 Premier Division	Hibernian	1–1	Kilmarnock	Easter Road, Edinburgh
	McAllister			Attendance: 8,001

6 April 1996 Premier Division	Motherwell	3–0	Hibernian	Fir Park, Motherwell
				Attendance: 5,964

14 April 1996 Premier Division	Hibernian	1–2	Celtic	Easter Road, Edinburgh
	McGinlay			Attendance: 10,742

20 April 1996 Premier Division	Hibernian	1–1	Raith Rovers	Easter Road, Edinburgh
	McGinlay			Attendance: 7,214

27 April 1996 Premier Division	Falkirk	1–1	Hibernian	Brockville Park, Falkirk
			McGinlay	Attendance: 2,813

4 May 1996 Premier Division	Hibernian	1–0	Partick Thistle	Easter Road, Edinburgh
	Jackson			Attendance: 6,685

=== Final table ===
Pos	Team	Pld	W	D	L	GF	GA	GD	Pts	Qualification or relegation
3	Aberdeen	36	16	7	13	52	45	+7	55	Qualification for the UEFA Cup qualifying round (Note: Aberdeen qualified for the UEFA Cup by winning the League Cup.)
4	Heart of Midlothian	36	16	7	13	55	53	+2	55	Qualification for the Cup Winners' Cup qualifying round (Note: As Rangers, the winners of the Scottish Cup, qualified for the Champions League via their league position, the place in the Cup Winners' Cup was passed to the cup runner-up, Heart of Midlothian.)
5	Hibernian	36	11	10	15	43	57	−14	43	
6	Raith Rovers	36	12	7	17	41	57	−16	43	
7	Kilmarnock	36	11	8	17	39	54	−15	41	

Source: Soccerbase
Rules for classification: 1) Points; 2) Goal difference; 3) Goals scored

== Scottish League Cup ==
=== Results ===
19 August 1995 Scottish League Cup	Hibernian	3–1	Stenhousemuir	Easter Road, Edinburgh

29 August 1995 Scottish League Cup	Airdrieonians	2–0	Hibernian	Excelsior Stadium, Airdrie

== Scottish Cup ==
=== Results ===
27 January 1996 Scottish Cup	Hibernian	0–2	Kilmarnock	Easter Road, Edinburgh
				Attendance: 8,350

== See also ==
- List of Hibernian F.C. seasons
