= 1993 Scottish League Cup final =

- Event: 1993–94 Scottish League Cup
| Rangers | Hibernian |
| 2 | 1 |
- Date: 24 October 1993
- Venue: Celtic Park, Glasgow
- Attendance: 47,632

The 1993 Scottish League Cup final was played on 24 October 1993, at Celtic Park in Glasgow and was the final of the 48th Scottish League Cup competition. The final was contested by Rangers and Hibernian. Rangers won the match 2–1 thanks to goals by Ian Durrant and Ally McCoist.

== Match details ==
24 October 1993

| Rangers | 2–1 | Hibernian |
|---|---|---|
| Durrant 55'; McCoist 81' | Report | McPherson 59' (o.g.) |

Celtic Park, Glasgow
Attendance: 47,632

RANGERS:
| GK | 1 | (Scotland) Ally Maxwell |
| DF | 2 | (England) Gary Stevens |
| DF | 3 | (Scotland) David Robertson |
| DF | 4 | (Scotland) Richard Gough (c) |
| DF | 5 | (Scotland) Dave McPherson |
| MF | 6 | (Scotland) Stuart McCall |
| MF | 7 | (England) Trevor Steven |
| MF | 8 | (Scotland) Ian Ferguson |
| MF | 9 | (Scotland) Ian Durrant |
| FW | 10 | (England) Mark Hateley |
| FW | 11 | (Netherlands) Pieter Huistra | (substituted off) ?' |
Substitutes:
| GK | ? | (Scotland) Colin Scott |
| MF | ? | (Ukraine) Alexei Mikhailichenko |
| FW | 14 | (Scotland) Ally McCoist | (substituted on) ?' |
Manager:
(Scotland) Walter Smith

HIBERNIAN:
| GK | 1 | (Scotland) Jim Leighton |
| DF | 2 | (Scotland) Willie Miller |
| DF | 3 | (Scotland) Graham Mitchell |
| MF | 4 | (Scotland) David Farrell |
| DF | 5 | (Scotland) Steven Tweed |
| DF | 6 | (Scotland) Gordon Hunter (c) |
| MF | 7 | (Scotland) Kevin McAllister |
| MF | 8 | (Scotland) Brian Hamilton |
| FW | 9 | (Scotland) Keith Wright |
| FW | 10 | (Scotland) Darren Jackson | (substituted off) ?' |
| MF | 11 | (Northern Ireland) Michael O'Neill |
Substitutes:
| GK | ? | (Scotland) Chris Reid |
| DF | ? | (Scotland) Dave Beaumont |
| FW | ? | (England) Gareth Evans | (substituted on) ?' |
Manager:
(Scotland) Alex Miller
