= 1989–90 Hibernian F.C. season =

Hibernian
1989–90 season
- Manager: Alex Miller
- Scottish Premier Division: 7th
- Scottish Cup: R5
- Scottish League Cup: R4
- UEFA Cup: R2
- Highest home attendance: 20,943 (v Rangers, 19 August)
- Lowest home attendance: 4445 (v Dundee, 28 April)
- Average home league attendance: 10,705 (down 3191)

The 1989–90 season saw Hibernian compete in the Scottish Premier Division, in which they finished 7th. They also competed in the Scottish Cup, where they reached the fifth round, the Scottish League Cup, where they were eliminated in the fourth round, and the UEFA Cup, in which they were eliminated in the second round.

== Scottish Premier Division ==
Match Day	Date	Opponent	H/A	Score	Hibernian Scorer(s)	Attendance
1	12 August	Aberdeen	A	0–1		15,986
2	19 August	Rangers	H	2–0	Houchen, Weir	20,943
3	26 August	Heart of Midlothian	A	0–1		29,464
4	9 September	Dundee United	H	2–0	Evans, Fellenger	6,938
5	16 September	St Mirren	H	3–1	Houchen (2), Collins	7,052
6	23 September	Dundee	A	0–0		6,876
7	30 September	Dunfermline Athletic	H	2–2	Houchen, Collins	11,368
8	4 October	Celtic	A	1–3	Evans	32,567
9	14 October	Motherwell	H	3–2	Houchen, Weir, Collins	8,416
10	25 October	Aberdeen	H	0–3		9,337
11	28 October	Rangers	A	0–3		35,260
12	4 November	Heart of Midlothian	H	1–1	Archibald	19,104
13	8 November	Dundee United	H	0–1		8,247
14	18 November	St Mirren	A	0–0		4,309
15	25 November	Dundee	H	3–2	Collins, McGinlay, Evans	5,644
16	2 December	Dunfermline Athletic	A	0–0		9,553
17	9 December	Celtic	H	0–3		17,343
18	26 December	Aberdeen	A	2–1	Archibald, Kane	19,365
19	30 December	Rangers	H	0–0		18,856
20	1 January	Heart of Midlothian	A	0–2		25,224
21	6 January	Dundee United	H	0–0		6,311
22	9 January	Motherwell	A	2–0	McGinlay, Sneddon	6,447
23	13 January	St Mirren	H	0–1		5,896
24	27 January	Dundee	A	0–2		5,723
25	3 February	Motherwell	H	1–2	Collins	6,114
26	10 February	Celtic	A	1–1	Collins	22,552
27	17 February	Dunfermline Athletic	H	2–1	Hamilton, Sneddon	6,869
28	3 March	St Mirren	A	1–0	Houchen	4,073
29	10 March	Aberdeen	H	3–2	Orr, McGinlay, Wright	9,762
30	24 March	Rangers	A	1–0	Houchen	37,542
31	31 March	Heart of Midlothian	H	1–2	Weir	17,363
32	7 April	Dundee United	A	0–1		6,633
33	17 April	Celtic	H	1–0	Kane (penalty)	10,815
34	21 April	Motherwell	A	0–1		4,435
35	28 April	Dundee	H	1–1	Houchen	4,475
36	5 May	Dunfermline Athletic	A	1–1	Kane	9,681

=== Final League table ===
Pos	Team	Pld	W	D	L	GF	GA	GD	Pts
5	Celtic	36	10	14	12	37	37	0	34
6	Motherwell	36	11	12	13	43	47	−4	34
7	Hibernian	36	12	10	14	34	41	−7	34
8	Dunfermline Athletic	36	11	8	17	37	50	−13	30
9	St Mirren	36	10	10	16	28	48	−20	30

Source: RSSSF
Rules for classification: 1) points; 2) goal difference; 3) number of goals scored.

=== Scottish League Cup ===
Round	Date	Opponent	H/A	Score	Hibernian Scorer(s)	Attendance
R2	15 August	Alloa Athletic	H	2–0	Sneddon (2)	
R3	22 August	Clydebank	H	0–0 (Hibs win 5–3 on penalties, aet)		
R4	29 August	Dunfermline Athletic	H	1–3	Collins	

=== UEFA Cup ===
Round	Date	Opponent	H/A	Score	Hibernian Scorer(s)	Attendance
R1 L1	12 September	(Hungary) Videoton FC Fehérvár	H	1–0	Mitchell	14,000
R1 L2	26 September	(Hungary) Videoton FC Fehérvár	A	3–0	Houchen, Evans, Collins	18,000
R2 L1	18 October	(Belgium) R.F.C. de Liège	H	0–0		18,000
R2 L2	31 October	(Belgium) R.F.C. de Liège	A	0–1		13,000

=== Scottish Cup ===
Round	Date	Opponent	H/A	Score	Hibernian Scorer(s)	Attendance
R3	20 January	Brechin City	A	2–0	Houchen, Orr	3,007
R4	24 February	East Fife	H	5–1	McGinlay (2), Houchen (2), Collins	7,232
R5	17 March	Dundee United	A	0–1		13,847

== See also ==
- List of Hibernian F.C. seasons
