= 1996–97 Hibernian F.C. season =

Hibernian
1996–97 season
- Manager: Alex Miller (until 30 September); Jocky Scott (30 September – 30 December); Jim Duffy (from 30 December)
- Premier Division: 9th
- Scottish Cup: R4
- League Cup: QF
- Highest home attendance: 15749
- Lowest home attendance: 7332
- Average home league attendance: 10561 (up 667)

Season 1996–97 was difficult for Hibs, as the club finished ninth in the Premier Division and only avoided relegation to the First Division by winning a playoff against Airdrie. There was also disappointment in the cup competitions, as the club were beaten by Celtic in the Scottish Cup, and Rangers in the League Cup. Manager Alex Miller was sacked in late September and replaced temporarily by Jocky Scott, before Jim Duffy took charge.

== League season ==
=== Results ===
| 10 August 1996 Premier Division | Hibernian | 1–2 | Kilmarnock | Easter Road, Edinburgh |
| | Weir 28' | | Mitchell 20'; Henry 26' |

| 17 August 1996 Premier Division | Dundee United | 0–1 | Hibernian | Tannadice Park, Dundee |
| | | | McAllister 30' | Attendance: 8,589 |

| 24 August 1996 Premier Division | Hibernian | 0–0 | Dunfermline Athletic | Easter Road, Edinburgh |

| 7 September 1996 Premier Division | Celtic | 5–0 | Hibernian | Celtic Park, Glasgow |
| | McGinlay 4' (o.g.); Cadete 14', 45'; O'Neil 51' van Hooijdonk 72' | | | Attendance: 47,042 |

| 14 September 1996 Premier Division | Hibernian | 1–0 | Raith Rovers | Easter Road, Edinburgh |
| | Kirk 54' (o.g.) | | | Attendance: 8,671; Referee: D. W. Smith |

| 21 September 1996 Premier Division | Aberdeen | 0–2 | Hibernian | Pittodrie Stadium, Aberdeen |
| | | | Jackson 44'; Wright 68' | Attendance: 12,500 |

| 28 September 1996 Premier Division | Hibernian | 1–3 | Heart of Midlothian | Easter Road, Edinburgh |
| | Jackson 57' (pen.) | | Cameron 19', 30'; Robertson 40' | Attendance: 14,746 |

| 12 October 1996 Premier Division | Hibernian | 2–1 | Rangers | Easter Road, Edinburgh |
| | Jackson 58'; Donald 62' | | Albertz 9' | Attendance: 12,864 |

| 19 October 1996 Premier Division | Motherwell | 1–1 | Hibernian | Fir Park, Motherwell |
| | McSkimming 73' | | Harper 7' | Attendance: 6,784 |

| 26 October 1996 Premier Division | Hibernian | 0–4 | Celtic | Easter Road, Edinburgh |
| | | | Thom 31', 74' van Hooijdonk 61'; Donnelly 77' | Attendance: 14,135 |

| 1 November 1996 Premier Division | Kilmarnock | 4–2 | Hibernian | Rugby Park, Kilmarnock |
| | Henry 17'; McIntyre 24'; Wright 52'; McGinlay 56' (o.g.) | | Harper 21'; Dow 31' | Attendance: 10,872 |

| 16 November 1996 Premier Division | Heart of Midlothian | 0–0 | Hibernian | Tynecastle Stadium, Edinburgh |
| | | | | Attendance: 15,129 |

| 23 November 1996 Premier Division | Hibernian | 0–1 | Aberdeen | Easter Road, Edinburgh |
| | | | Windass 44' | Attendance: 11,522 |

| 30 November 1996 Premier Division | Hibernian | 2–0 | Motherwell | Easter Road, Edinburgh |
| | Jackson 35', 90' (pen.) | | | Attendance: 7,332 |

| 7 December 1996 Premier Division | Rangers | 4–3 | Hibernian | Ibrox Park, Glasgow |
| | Ferguson 34'; McCoist 71', 74'; Laudrup 83' | | Wright 21'; Jackson 41'; McGinlay 86' | Attendance: 48,053 |

| 11 December 1996 Premier Division | Dunfermline Athletic | 2–1 | Hibernian | East End Park, Dunfermline |
| | Millar 63'; Ireland 82' | | Jackson 74' | Attendance: 5,295 |

| 14 December 1996 Premier Division | Hibernian | 1–1 | Dundee United | Easter Road, Edinburgh |
| | Harper 20' | | McLaren 44' (pen.) | Attendance: 8,250 |

| 21 December 1996 Premier Division | Raith Rovers | 0–3 | Hibernian | Stark's Park, Kirkcaldy |
| | | | Jackson 61', 79'; McGinlay 67' | Attendance: 4,224 |

| 26 December 1996 Premier Division | Hibernian | 0–1 | Kilmarnock | Easter Road, Edinburgh |
| | | | McIntyre 42' | Attendance: 8,957 |

| 28 December 1996 Premier Division | Aberdeen | 1–1 | Hibernian | Pittodrie Stadium, Aberdeen |
| | Shearer 90' | | Jackson 14' | Attendance: 10,000 |

| 1 January 1997 Premier Division | Hibernian | 0–4 | Heart of Midlothian | Easter Road, Edinburgh |
| | | | Robertson 33'; Hamilton 62', 87'; Cameron 65' | Attendance: 15,826 |

| 4 January 1997 Premier Division | Hibernian | 1–2 | Rangers | Easter Road, Edinburgh |
| | Harper 7' | | Andersen 11'; Albertz 72' (pen.) | Attendance: 12,650 |

| 11 January 1997 Premier Division | Motherwell | 2–1 | Hibernian | Fir Park, Motherwell |
| | McSkimming 20'; Hunter 24' (o.g.) | | Dow 49' | Attendance: 5,855 |

| 18 January 1997 Premier Division | Celtic | 4–1 | Hibernian | Celtic Park, Glasgow |
| | van Hooijdonk 21', 48'; McLaughlin 42'; Cadete 68' | | Harper 63' | Attendance: 49,092 |

| 1 February 1997 Premier Division | Hibernian | 1–1 | Raith Rovers | Easter Road, Edinburgh |
| | Kirkwood 13' (o.g.) | | Lennon 69' | Attendance: 9,424 |

| 8 February 1997 Premier Division | Dundee United | 0–0 | Hibernian | Tannadice Park, Dundee |
| | | | | Attendance: 9,219 |

| 23 February 1997 Premier Division | Rangers | 3–1 | Hibernian | Ibrox Park, Glasgow |
| | Gough 3'; Albertz 49' (pen.); Laudrup 68' | | Dennis 54' | Attendance: 48,070 |

| 1 March 1997 Premier Division | Hibernian | 1–1 | Motherwell | Easter Road, Edinburgh |
| | Wright 51' | | Coyne 64' | Attendance: 8,328 |

| 8 March 1997 Premier Division | Hibernian | 1–0 | Dunfermline Athletic | Easter Road, Edinburgh |
| | Wright 11' |

| 15 March 1997 Premier Division | Heart of Midlothian | 1–0 | Hibernian | Tynecastle Stadium, Edinburgh |
| | McCann 82' | | | Attendance: 15,136 |

| 22 March 1997 Premier Division | Hibernian | 3–1 | Aberdeen | Easter Road, Edinburgh |
| | McGinlay 6', 57'; Tosh 72' | | Craig 53' | Attendance: 9,669 |

| 5 April 1997 Premier Division | Hibernian | 2–0 | Dundee United | Easter Road, Edinburgh |
| | Charnley 73' (pen.); McGinlay 78' | | | Attendance: 11,010 |

| 12 April 1997 Premier Division | Dunfermline Athletic | 1–1 | Hibernian | East End Park, Dunfermline |
| | Britton 11' | | Jackson 31' | Attendance: 8,752; Referee: McCluskey |

| 19 April 1997 Premier Division | Kilmarnock | 1–1 | Hibernian | Rugby Park, Kilmarnock |
| | Wright 14' | | Montgomerie 45' (o.g.) | Attendance: 10,886 |

| 4 May 1997 Premier Division | Hibernian | 1–3 | Celtic | Easter Road, Edinburgh |
| | Power 35' | | Cadete 12', 65' di Canio 43' | Attendance: 10,603 |

| 10 May 1997 Premier Division | Raith Rovers | 1–1 | Hibernian | Stark's Park, Kirkcaldy |
| | Duffield 7' | | McGinlay 26' | Attendance: 6,275 |

=== Final table ===
| Pos | Team | Pld | W | D | L | GF | GA | GD | Pts | Qualification or relegation |
|---|---|---|---|---|---|---|---|---|---|---|
| 6 | Aberdeen | 36 | 10 | 14 | 12 | 45 | 54 | −9 | 44 | |
| 7 | Kilmarnock | 36 | 11 | 6 | 19 | 41 | 61 | −20 | 39 | Qualification for the Cup Winners' Cup qualifying round (Note: Kilmarnock qualified for the Cup Winners' Cup as the winners of the Scottish Cup.) |
| 8 | Motherwell | 36 | 9 | 11 | 16 | 44 | 55 | −11 | 38 | |
| 9 | Hibernian (O) | 36 | 9 | 11 | 16 | 38 | 55 | −17 | 38 | Qualification for the Play-off |
| 10 | Raith Rovers (R) | 36 | 6 | 7 | 23 | 29 | 73 | −44 | 25 | Relegation to the First Division |

Source: Soccerbase
Rules for classification: 1) Points; 2) Goal difference; 3) Goals scored
(O) Play-off winners; (R) Relegated

=== Play-offs ===
Having finished ninth in the Scottish Premier Division, Hibs then had to contest a relegation / promotion play-off with Airdrie, who had finished second in the 1996–97 Scottish First Division. Hibs won 1–0 at Easter Road and 4–2 at Broadwood Stadium to retain their place in the Premier Division, with a 5–2 aggregate victory.

Results

| 17 May 1997 Play-off first leg | Hibernian | 1–0 | Airdrieonians | Easter Road, Edinburgh |
| | | | | Attendance: 15,308; Referee: McCluskey |

| 22 May 1997 Play-off second leg | Airdrieonians | 2–4 | Hibernian | Broadwood Stadium, Cumbernauld |
| | | | | Attendance: 6,275 |

== Scottish League Cup ==
Hibs reached the quarter-finals thanks to two wins against lower division opposition, but then lost 4–0 to eventual winners Rangers.

=== Results ===
| 13 August 1996 Scottish League Cup | Brechin City | 0–2 | Hibernian | Glebe Park, Brechin |
| | | | Lavety 39'; Dow 58' |

| 3 September 1996 Scottish League Cup | Albion Rovers | 0–2 | Hibernian | Cliftonhill, Coatbridge |
| | | | Wright 18'; McGinlay 72' |

| 18 September 1996 Scottish League Cup | Rangers | 4–0 | Hibernian | Ibrox Park, Glasgow |
| | Durie 29' van Vossen 47', 80'; Albertz 89' | | | Attendance: 45,104; Referee: McCluskey |

== Scottish Cup ==
Hibs defeated Aberdeen after a penalty shootout in third round, but then lost in a fourth round replay to Celtic.

=== Results ===
| 23 January 1997 Scottish Cup | Hibernian | 2–2 | Aberdeen | Easter Road, Edinburgh |
| | Miller 48'; McGinlay 78' | | Booth 70'; Dodds 75' | Attendance: 9,588 |

| 28 January 1997 Scottish Cup | Aberdeen | 0–0 AET (3 – 5 PSO) | Hibernian | Pittodrie Stadium, Aberdeen |
| | | | | Attendance: 15,500 |

| 17 February 1997 Scottish Cup | Hibernian | 1–1 | Celtic | Easter Road, Edinburgh |
| | Jackson 83' | | O'Donnell 16' | Attendance: 16,000 |

| 26 February 1997 Scottish Cup | Celtic | 2–0 | Hibernian | Celtic Park, Glasgow |
| | O'Donnell 35' di Canio 54' | | | Attendance: 46,424 |

== See also ==
- List of Hibernian F.C. seasons
