= Jim Leighton =

Scottish footballer (born 1958)

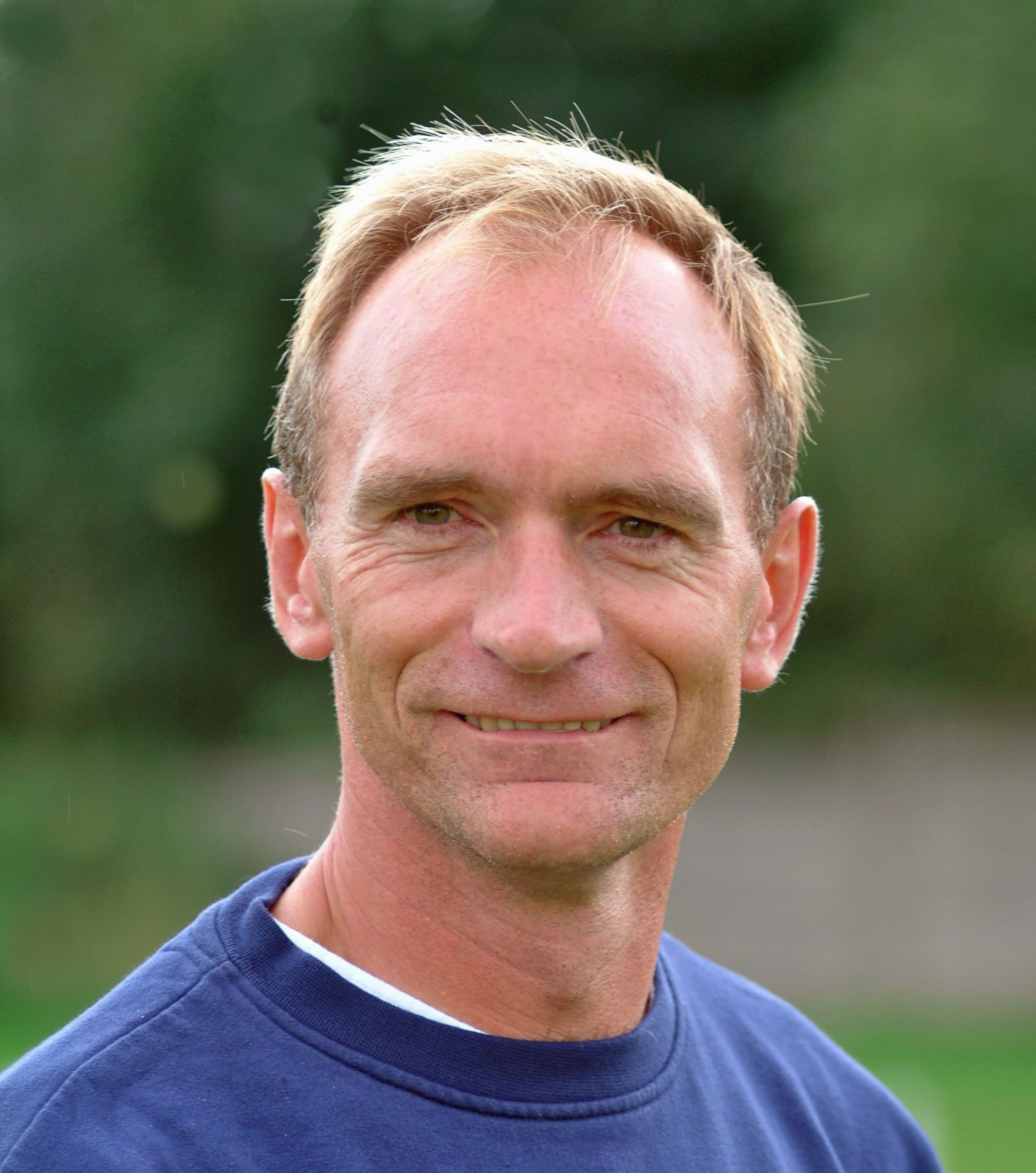
- Leighton in 2009

Personal information
- Full name: James Leighton
- Date of birth: 24 July 1958 (age 68)
- Place of birth: Johnstone, Renfrewshire, Scotland
- Height: 6 ft 1 in (1.85 m)
- Position: Goalkeeper

Youth career
- Eastercraigs Boys Club
- Dalry Thistle

Senior career*
Years	Team	Apps	(Gls)
1977–1988	Aberdeen	301	(0)
1977–1978	→ Deveronvale (loan)		
1988–1992	Manchester United	73	(0)
1991	→ Arsenal (loan)	0	(0)
1991–1992	→ Reading (loan)	8	(0)
1992–1993	Dundee	21	(0)
1993	→ Sheffield United (loan)	0	(0)
1993–1997	Hibernian	151	(0)
1997–2000	Aberdeen	82	(0)
Total		636	(0)

International career
1982	Scotland U21	2	(0)
1982–1998	Scotland	91	(0)
- * Club domestic league appearances and goals

James Leighton (born 24 July 1958) is a Scottish former professional footballer who played as a goalkeeper. Leighton started his career with Aberdeen, where he won seven domestic trophies and the 1982–83 European Cup Winners' Cup under the management of Alex Ferguson. Ferguson then signed Leighton for Manchester United in 1988, but dropped him after he conceded three goals in the 1990 FA Cup Final. Leighton then had spells with Arsenal, Reading, Dundee and Sheffield United, and rebuilt his career after joining Hibernian in 1993. He returned to Aberdeen in 1997, leading to a career total of over 600 appearances in the league alone.

Leighton played in 91 international matches for Scotland. He was chosen for Scotland's FIFA World Cup squads in 1982, 1986, 1990 and 1998, playing in the latter three of those tournaments.

Overall, he made over 1,050 appearances in his career.

== Playing career ==
=== Aberdeen ===
Leighton joined Aberdeen from Scottish Junior club Dalry Thistle in 1977, after working in the civil service on leaving school. Before breaking into the Aberdeen first team he was loaned out for one season to Highland League club Deveronvale, where he is now an inductee of the club's Hall of Fame. Leighton achieved his greatest success under the management of Alex Ferguson in the early to mid-1980s. With Leighton in goal, Ferguson's Aberdeen won Premier Division titles in 1984 and 1985, the Scottish Cup four times, the Scottish League Cup once, and the European Cup Winners' Cup and Super Cup in 1983.

Brian Clough, a notorious critic of other goalkeepers for the national team during the 1970s and 1980s, has been reported as saying "Jim Leighton is a rare bird – a Scottish goalkeeper that can be relied on."

=== Manchester United ===
Ferguson, who had left Aberdeen to manage Manchester United in 1986, signed Leighton for £750,000 in 1988. In his first season with United, the club finished 11th. Leighton conceded 35 league goals and kept 14 clean sheets, while he conceded more than two goals only once in all competitions.

In 1989–90 United finished two places lower in the league in 13th. Leighton played when United were defeated 5–1 in the league by newly promoted neighbours Manchester City, and conceded three goals in 1990 FA Cup Final, a 3–3 draw with Crystal Palace. He was then dropped from the United starting lineup for the replay, in which Les Sealey made a number of saves as United won the match 1–0. Leighton's disappointment was such that when handed the winner's medal by Sealey, he later returned it to his replacement's pocket, and when a medal specifically for Leighton was received by the club due to his appearance in the first match, he declined that too. The two players remained close friends, although Leighton's relationship with Ferguson deteriorated to the point where the two were no longer on speaking terms.

Sealey retained the position of first-choice goalkeeper for the 1990–91 season after signing a permanent contract. Although Leighton remained contracted to United for nearly two more years, he played only one more game for the club (against Halifax Town in the Football League Cup on 26 September 1990). He was fourth choice keeper in 1990–91 behind Sealey, Gary Walsh and youngster Mark Bosnich, and was loaned to Arsenal between March and May 1991, a period in which they won the league title, although he did not play.

Leighton remained fourth choice United keeper in season 1991–92 behind Peter Schmeichel, Walsh and youngster Ian Wilkinson. He spent a portion of that season on loan with third-tier Reading.

=== Return to Scotland ===
In March 1992 Iain Munro signed him for Dundee for a £200,000 fee. He played in the last dozen league games of the season winning the title in the Scottish second tier and promotion to the top flight. He was out of favour at Dens Park after Simon Stainrod replaced Munro as manager. Leighton had another non-playing loan spell at Sheffield United.

His career was revitalised after Alex Miller signed him for Hibernian in summer 1993, Leighton playing over 150 games and missing only one league match in four seasons. He played in the 1993 Scottish League Cup Final defeat to Rangers. He was recalled to the Scotland national team, collecting 23 of his 91 Scotland caps at Hibs. He later said he played the best football of his career in his spell at Easter Road and rated Miller the second-best manager he played under.

In 1997 Leighton returned to Aberdeen, where he featured regularly for another three seasons and reached 500 appearances for the club in 1998. He was captain in the 2000 Scottish League Cup final defeat to Celtic.

He retired from playing after the 2000 Scottish Cup final defeat by Rangers. In that game he was substituted after three minutes, suffering a broken jaw in a challenge from Rod Wallace (requiring the insertion of metal plates into his face). With no substitute goalkeeper available, forward Robbie Winters took over in goal and Aberdeen lost 4–0. Leighton's final league appearance that season meant that he set the record for the oldest player in the Scottish Premier League at 41 years and 302 days (since broken by Andy Millen in 2007).

In July 2000 he was given a testimonial against Middlesbrough, the same opponent as in his first appearance for Aberdeen in a 1978 friendly; however he could not actually play in the match due to recovering from his cup final injury. He released his autobiography the same year. In 2004 he was inducted into the club's Hall of Fame.

=== International career ===
Leighton's international career lasted for 16 years, from 1982 to 1998. He was an uncapped squad member for the 1982 World Cup, before making his debut against East Germany on 13 October 1982. Within two years he was his country's No. 1, and he played in all of his country's matches at the 1986 and 1990 World Cups.

After Leighton fell out of favour at club level, Andy Goram became Scotland first choice goalkeeper and played at Euro 92 and Euro 96. Leighton regained the position after a man of the match performance in a 1-0 home win versus Sweden in November 1996 during qualification for the 1998 World Cup. Leighton played all three Scotland matches at the tournament finals and became the last footballer born in the 1950s to play in a FIFA World Cup game.

He retired from international football on 10 October 1998. His last match was a European Championship qualifier against Estonia when aged 40 years and 78 days. This set a new record as the oldest player to play for Scotland, since broken by David Weir in September 2010 and later by Craig Gordon in June 2024. Leighton is a member of the Scotland Football Hall of Fame, having won his 50th cap in 1989. Leighton played 91 times for Scotland, fourth only to John McGinn (94), Andy Robertson (102) and Kenny Dalglish (102).

== Coaching career ==
Leighton became Aberdeen's goalkeeping coach after retiring as a player. He parted company with the club in August 2009 when manager Mark McGhee (his former teammate, who had also brought him to Reading years earlier) chose to replace him with Colin Meldrum. In February 2010 he was appointed as goalkeeping coach for Huntly in the Highland League. Leighton was reappointed as the goalkeeping coach at Aberdeen on 13 December 2010, the first act of the new management team of Craig Brown and Archie Knox; he left the club again at the request of manager Derek McInnes, at the end of the 2014–15 season. He commented soon afterwards that he would look for work outside football, as he was unwilling to relocate from Aberdeen due to other work and family commitments, and subsequently became a sales manager for companies providing services to the city's offshore industry.

== Career statistics ==
=== Club ===
Appearances and goals by club, season and competition
Club	Season	League			National Cup		League Cup		Europe		Other		Total	
Club	Season	Division	Apps	Goals	Apps	Goals	Apps	Goals	Apps	Goals	Apps	Goals	Apps	Goals
Aberdeen	1976–77	Scottish Premier Division	0	0	0	0	0	0	0	0	-	-	0	0
Aberdeen	1977–78	Scottish Premier Division	0	0	0	0	0	0	0	0	-	-	0	0
Aberdeen	1978–79	Scottish Premier Division	11	0	0	0	3	0	3	0	-	-	17	0
Aberdeen	1979–80	Scottish Premier Division	2	0	1	0	0	0	0	0	-	-	3	0
Aberdeen	1980–81	Scottish Premier Division	35	0	2	0	5	0	4	0	3 (Note: Appearances in Drybrough Cup.)	0	49	0
Aberdeen	1981–82	Scottish Premier Division	36	0	6	0	10	0	6	0	-	-	58	0
Aberdeen	1982–83	Scottish Premier Division	35	0	5	0	8	0	11	0	-	-	59	0
Aberdeen	1983–84	Scottish Premier Division	36	0	7	0	10	0	10	0	-	-	63	0
Aberdeen	1984–85	Scottish Premier Division	34	0	6	0	1	0	2	0	-	-	43	0
Aberdeen	1985–86	Scottish Premier Division	26	0	5	0	4	0	5	0	-	-	40	0
Aberdeen	1986–87	Scottish Premier Division	42	0	3	0	1	0	2	0	-	-	48	0
Aberdeen	1987–88	Scottish Premier Division	44	0	6	0	5	0	4	0	-	-	59	0
Aberdeen	Total		301	0	41	0	47	0	47	0	3	0	439	0
Deveronvale (loan)	1977–78	Highland League	-	-	-	-	-	-	-	-	-	-	40	0
Manchester United	1988–89	First Division	38	0	7	0	3	0	0	0	-	-	48	0
Manchester United	1989–90	First Division	35	0	7	0	3	0	0	0	-	-	45	0
Manchester United	1990–91	First Division	0	0	0	0	1	0	0	0	-	-	1	0
Manchester United	Total		73	0	14	0	7	0	0	0	-	-	94	0
Arsenal (loan)	1990–91	First Division	0	0	0	0	0	0	0	0	-	-	0	0
Reading (loan)	1991–92	Third Division	8	0	3	0	0	0	0	0	-	-	11	0
Dundee	1991–92	Scottish First Division	13	0	2	0	0	0	0	0	-	-	15	0
Dundee	1992–93	Scottish Premier Division	8	0	0	0	2	0	0	0	-	-	10	0
Dundee	Total		21	0	2	0	2	0	0	0	-	-	25	0
Sheffield United (loan)	1992–93	Premier League	0	0	0	0	0	0	0	0	-	-	0	0
Hibernian	1993–94	Scottish Premier Division	44	0	2	0	5	0	0	0	-	-	51	0
Hibernian	1994–95	Scottish Premier Division	36	0	5	0	3	0	0	0	-	-	44	0
Hibernian	1995–96	Scottish Premier Division	36	0	1	0	2	0	0	0	-	-	39	0
Hibernian	1996–97	Scottish Premier Division	35	0	4	0	3	0	0	0	2	0	44	0
Hibernian	Total		151	0	12	0	13	0	0	0	2	0	178	0
Aberdeen	1997–98	Scottish Premier Division	34	0	1	0	2	0	0	0	-	-	37	0
Aberdeen	1998–99	SPL	22	0	0	0	2	0	0	0	-	-	24	0
Aberdeen	1999–2000	SPL	26	0	7	0	3	0	0	0	-	-	36	0
Aberdeen	Total		82	0	8	0	7	0	0	0	-	-	97	0
Career total			636+	0	80+	0	76	0	47	0	5	0	884	0

=== International ===
Appearances and goals by national team and year
National team	Year	Apps	Goals
Scotland	1982	3	0
Scotland	1983	8	0
Scotland	1984	6	0
Scotland	1985	8	0
Scotland	1986	7	0
Scotland	1987	7	0
Scotland	1988	6	0
Scotland	1989	8	0
Scotland	1990	5	0
Scotland	1991	0	0
Scotland	1992	0	0
Scotland	1993	1	0
Scotland	1994	3	0
Scotland	1995	9	0
Scotland	1996	4	0
Scotland	1997	8	0
Scotland	1998	8	0
Total		91	0

== Honours ==
Deveronvale

- Bells Cup East: 1977–78

Aberdeen 'A'

- SFL Reserve Cup: 1978–79
- Aberdeenshire Cup: 1980–81, 1982–83

Aberdeen

- Scottish Premier Division: 1983–84, 1984–85
- Scottish Cup: 1981–82, 1982–83, 1983–84, 1985–86
- Scottish League Cup: 1985–86
- Drybrough Cup: 1980–81
- European Cup Winners' Cup: 1982–83
- European Super Cup: 1983

Manchester United

- FA Cup: 1989–90
- FA Charity Shield: 1990 (shared)

Dundee

- Scottish Football League First Division (second tier): 1991–92

Scotland

- The Rous Cup: 1985

Individual

- Scotland national football team roll of honour: 1989
- Scottish Football Hall of Fame inductee: 2008
- Aberdeen FC Hall of Fame inductee: 2004
- Deveronvale FC Hall of Fame Inductee: 2019

== See also ==
- List of footballers in Scotland by number of league appearances (500+)
- List of Scotland national football team captains
