= 1991 Scottish League Cup final =

- Event: 1991–92 Scottish League Cup
Hibernian	Dunfermline Athletic
2	0
- Date: 27 October 1991
- Venue: Hampden Park, Glasgow
- Referee: Brian McGinlay
- Attendance: 40,377

The 1991 Scottish League Cup final was played on 27 October 1991 at Hampden Park in Glasgow and was the final of the 46th Scottish League Cup competition. The final was contested by Hibernian and Dunfermline Athletic. Hibernian won the match 2–0, thanks to goals from Tommy McIntyre and Keith Wright.

== Route to the final ==
Round	Opposition	Score
Second round	Stirling Albion	3–0
Third round	Kilmarnock	3–2
Quarter-final	Ayr United	2–0
Semi-final	Rangers	1–0

=== Hibernian ===
Scottish Premier Division club Hibernian (Hibs) entered the competition in the second round. They began their campaign with an away tie against Stirling Albion, but the match was in fact played at McDiarmid Park in Perth. This was because Annfield Stadium had an artificial turf, which gave visiting clubs the option of moving the match to a neutral venue. New signing Keith Wright scored in a 3–0 victory, then also scored in away victories against Kilmarnock and Ayr United.

Hibs were then drawn against league champions and League Cup holders Rangers. Hibs entered the match as underdogs, given Rangers' greater experience of playing in big matches and internationals. Wright gave Hibs the lead, however, exploiting an error by Andy Goram. This proved to be the only goal of the match, as John Burridge played well in goal for Hibs and both Mo Johnston and Ally McCoist missed chances for Rangers.

=== Dunfermline ===
Round	Opposition	Score
Second round	Alloa Athletic	4–1
Third round	St Mirren	1–1
Quarter-final	Dundee United	3–1
Semi-final	Airdrieonians	1–1

Dunfermline Athletic, also a Scottish Premier Division club, entered the competition in the second round. Home victories against Alloa Athletic, St Mirren (after a penalty shootout) and Dundee United earned a place in a semi-final. Before the semi-final tie, however, Dunfermline sacked manager Iain Munro. The semi-final was played against Airdrieonians at Tynecastle. Dunfermline were losing 1–0 late in the game, but were controversially awarded a penalty kick by referee David Syme. The penalty was converted and Dunfermline progressed to the final by winning a penalty shootout.

== Match details ==
27 October 1991

Hibernian	2–0	Dunfermline Athletic
McIntyre 49' (pen.); Wright 86'

Hampden Park, Glasgow
Attendance: 40,377
Referee: Brian McGinlay

=== Teams ===
HIBERNIAN:
GK	1	John Burridge
DF	2	Willie Miller
DF	3	Graham Mitchell
DF	4	Gordon Hunter
DF	5	Tommy McIntyre
MF	6	Murdo MacLeod (c)
MF	7	Mickey Weir
MF	8	Brian Hamilton
FW	9	Keith Wright
FW	10	Gareth Evans
MF	11	Pat McGinlay
Substitutes:
DF	12	Neil Orr
MF	14	Dave Beaumont
Manager:
Alex Miller

DUNFERMLINE ATHLETIC:
GK	1	Andy Rhodes
DF	2	Tommy Wilson
DF	3	Ray Sharp	Substituted off
DF	4	Norrie McCathie
DF	5	David Moyes
MF	6	Craig Robertson
MF	7	Derek McWilliams
MF	8	István Kozma
FW	9	Scott Leitch
MF	10	Billy Davies
MF	11	Chris Sinclair	Substituted off
Substitutes:
DF	12	Eddie Cunnington	Substituted on
MF	14	Ian McCall	Substituted on
Manager:
Jocky Scott
