= Graeme Miller =

Graeme Miller may refer to:

- Graeme Miller (cricketer) (1940–2008), Australian cricketer
- Graeme Miller (cyclist) (born 1960), New Zealand Olympic cyclist
- Graeme Miller (footballer) (born 1973), Scottish professional footballer
- Graeme Miller (Alien vs. Predator), a character in the 2004 film Alien vs. Predator
