= List of Dundee F.C. managers =

This is a list of Dundee F.C. managers and all those who have held the position of manager of the first team of Dundee, since its formation in 1893. The club have had 36 permanent managers, with Jocky Scott holding the position three times and both Sandy MacFarlane and Jim Duffy holding it twice.

== Managers ==
Information correct as of matches played 21 November 2026.

Key to record:

- P = Matches played
- W = Matches won
- D = Matches drawn
- L = Matches lost
- Win % = Win ratio

Key to honours:

- LG = Scottish league
- FA = Scottish Cup
- LC = Scottish League Cup
- L1 = Scottish second tier
- CC = Scottish Challenge Cup

*	Caretaker manager

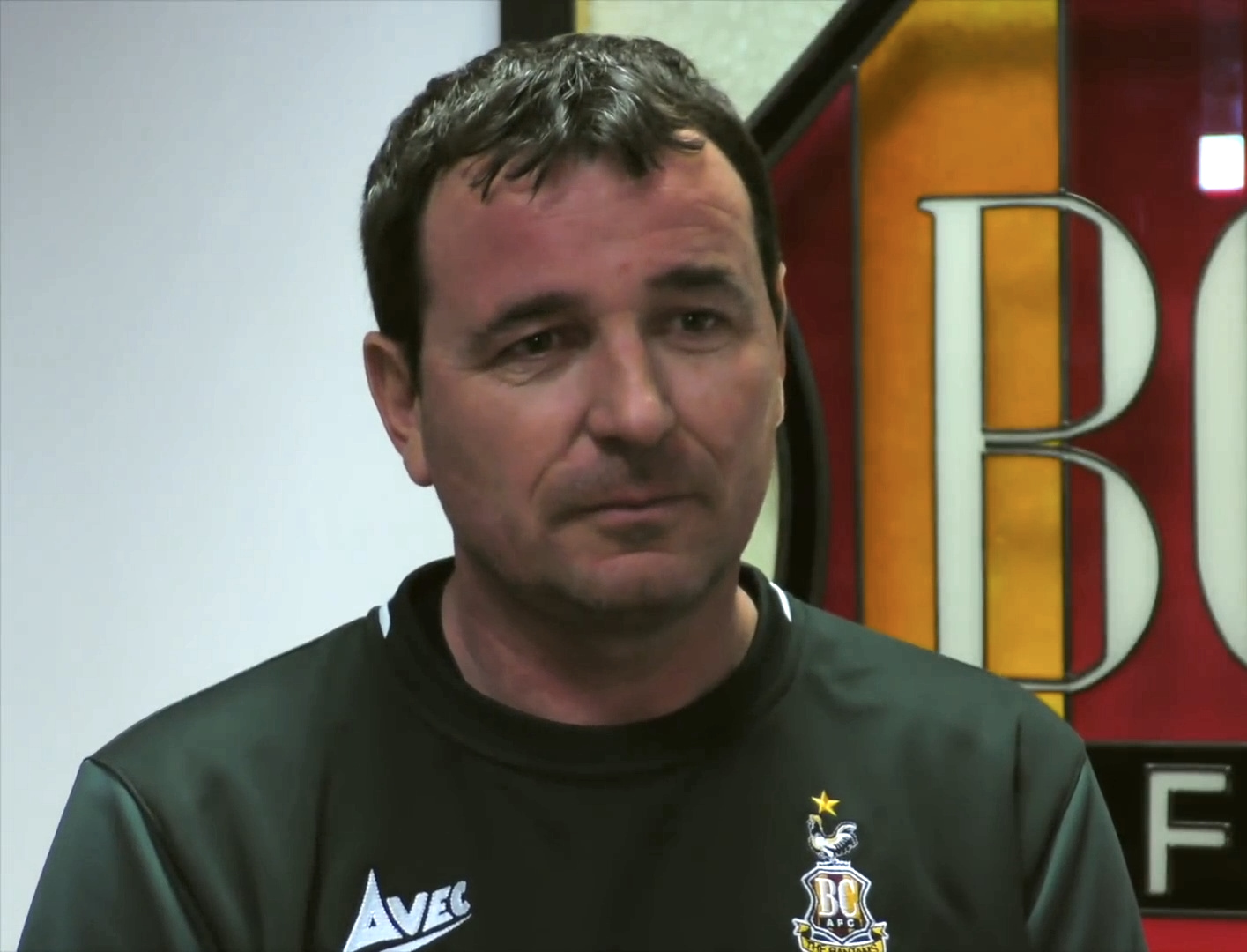
Gary Bowyer has the highest win ratio of any Dundee F.C. manager.

List of Dundee F.C. managers
	Name	From	To	Record					Honours					Ref
	Name	From	To	P	W	D	L	Win %	LG	FA	LC	L1	CC	Ref
(Scotland)	Willie Wallace	April 1899	February 1919	611	261	143	207	42.72	0	1	0	0	0	
(Scotland)	Sandy MacFarlane	March 1919	February 1925	269	119	65	85	44.24	0	0	0	0	0	
(Scotland)	Alec McNair	June 1925	October 1927	91	35	22	34	38.46	0	0	0	0	0	
(Scotland)	Sandy MacFarlane (2)	December 1927	June 1928	22	9	5	8	40.91	0	0	0	0	0	
(Scotland)	Jimmy Bissett	July 1928	May 1933	212	75	48	89	35.38	0	0	0	0	0	
(Northern Ireland)	Billy McCandless	June 1933	June 1937	163	59	41	63	36.20	0	0	0	0	0	
(Scotland)	Andy Cunningham	June 1937	June 1940	110	42	24	44	38.18	0	0	0	0	0	
(Scotland)	George Anderson	May 1944	July 1954	329	162	64	103	49.24	0	0	2	1	0	
(Scotland)	Willie Thornton	July 1954	June 1959	222	87	43	92	39.19	0	0	0	0	0	
(Scotland)	Bob Shankly	July 1959	February 1965	253	128	45	80	50.59	1	0	0	0	0	
(Scotland)	Sammy Kean^{*}	February 1965	March 1965	4	2	1	1	50.00	0	0	0	0	0	
(Scotland)	Bobby Ancell	March 1965	June 1968	162	69	35	58	42.59	0	0	0	0	0	
(Scotland)	John Prentice	July 1968	December 1971	153	66	37	50	43.14	0	0	0	0	0	
(Scotland)	David White	January 1972	May 1977	271	123	62	86	45.39	0	0	1	0	0	
(Scotland)	Tommy Gemmell	June 1977	April 1980	135	69	24	42	51.11	0	0	0	1	0	
(Scotland)	Hugh Robertson^{*}	April 1980	April 1980	2	0	0	2	0.00	0	0	0	0	0	
(Scotland)	Don Mackay	May 1980	December 1983	162	62	34	66	38.27	0	0	0	0	0	
(Scotland)	Archie Knox	December 1983	May 1986	111	44	22	45	39.64	0	0	0	0	0	
(Scotland)	Jocky Scott	August 1986	May 1988	108	47	25	36	43.52	0	0	0	0	0	
(Scotland)	Dave Smith	August 1988	January 1989	27	7	9	11	25.93	0	0	0	0	0	
(Scotland)	John Blackley^{*}	January 1989	February 1989	3	0	0	3	0.00	0	0	0	0	0	
(Scotland)	Gordon Wallace	February 1989	October 1991	108	45	25	38	41.67	0	0	0	0	1	
(Scotland)	John Blackley^{*}	October 1991	October 1991	1	0	0	1	0.00	0	0	0	0	0	
(Scotland)	Iain Munro	October 1991	January 1992	20	9	7	4	45.00	0	0	0	0	0	
(England)	Simon Stainrod	February 1992	August 1993	68	18	20	30	26.47	0	0	0	1	0	
(Scotland)	Jim Duffy	August 1993	December 1996	162	67	43	52	41.36	0	0	0	0	0	
(Scotland)	John McCormack	January 1997	February 1998	47	22	15	10	46.81	0	0	0	0	0	
(Scotland)	Jocky Scott (2)	February 1998	June 2000	95	35	18	42	36.84	0	0	0	1	0	
(Italy)	Ivano Bonetti	July 2000	July 2002	88	29	20	39	32.95	0	0	0	0	0	
(Scotland)	Jim Duffy (2)	July 2002	August 2005	139	42	36	61	30.22	0	0	0	0	0	
(Scotland)	Gerry Britton^{*}	August 2005	August 2005	2	0	2	0	0.00	0	0	0	0	0	
(Republic of Ireland)	Alan Kernaghan	September 2005	April 2006	37	9	16	12	24.32	0	0	0	0	0	
(Scotland)	Barry Smith^{*}	April 2006	April 2006	2	1	0	1	50.00	0	0	0	0	0	
(Scotland)	Alex Rae	May 2006	October 2008	95	42	20	33	44.21	0	0	0	0	0	
(Scotland)	David Farrell^{*}	October 2008	October 2008	1	0	0	1	0.00	0	0	0	0	0	
(Scotland)	Jocky Scott (3)	October 2008	March 2010	64	31	18	15	48.44	0	0	0	0	1	
(Scotland)	Gordon Chisholm	March 2010	October 2010	21	8	6	7	38.10	0	0	0	0	0	
(Scotland)	Barry Smith	October 2010	February 2013	102	40	26	36	39.22	0	0	0	0	0	
(Scotland)	John Brown	February 2013	February 2014	41	19	8	14	46.34	0	0	0	0	0	
(Scotland)	Paul Hartley	February 2014	April 2017	138	46	36	56	33.33	0	0	0	1	0	
(Scotland)	Neil McCann	April 2017	October 2018	65	22	9	34	33.85	0	0	0	0	0	
(Scotland)	Jim McIntyre	October 2018	May 2019	31	4	7	20	12.90	0	0	0	0	0	
(Scotland)	James McPake	May 2019	February 2022	106	44	25	37	41.51	0	0	0	0	0	
(Scotland)	Mark McGhee	February 2022	May 2022	14	1	5	8	7.14	0	0	0	0	0	
(England)	Gary Bowyer	June 2022	May 2023	48	26	14	8	54.17	0	0	0	1	0	
(Scotland)	Tony Docherty	May 2023	May 2025	90	31	20	39	34.44	0	0	0	0	0	
(Scotland)	Steven Pressley	June 2025	present	62	22	12	28	35.48	0	0	0	0	0	

== Bibliography ==
- Wilkie, Jim (1984). Across The Great Divide: A History of Professional Football in Dundee. Edinburgh: Mainstream Publishing. ISBN 1-84018-412-4.
- Adams, Duncan (2004). The Essential Scottish Football Fan. Swadlincote: Aesculus Press Ltd. ISBN 1-904328-16-4.
- Cairney, John (2004). A Scottish Football Hall of Fame. Edinburgh: Mainstream Publishing. ISBN 1-84018-920-7.
- Duthie, Tom (20 June 2018). "125 of Dundee FC: There's only one winner in battle of dark blue bosses". Evening Telegraph. DC Thomson.
