= Thomas McIntyre =

Thomas McIntyre may refer to:

- Thomas J. McIntyre (1915–1992), U.S. politician from the state of New Hampshire
- Tommy McIntyre (born 1963), Scottish association football player
