= Jackie Sinclair =

Scottish footballer (1943–2010)

Jackie (John) Sinclair
Personal information
- Full name: John Evens Wright Sinclair
- Date of birth: 21 July 1943
- Place of birth: Culross, Fife, Scotland
- Date of death: 1 September 2010 (aged 67)
- Place of death: Dollar, Clackmannanshire, Scotland
- Height: 5 ft 6 in (1.68 m)
- Position: Winger

Senior career*
Years	Team	Apps	(Gls)
1961–1965	Dunfermline Athletic	61	(33)
1965–1968	Leicester City	103	(50)
1968–1969	Newcastle United	43	(6)
1969–1973	Sheffield Wednesday	101	(14)
1973	→ Chesterfield (loan)	10	(3)
1973–1975	Dunfermline Athletic	52	(9)
1975–1976	Stenhousemuir	18	(1)
Total		388	(109)

International career
1966	Scotland	1	(0)
- * Club domestic league appearances and goals

John Evens Wright Sinclair (21 July 1943 – 1 September 2010) was a Scottish footballer who played as a winger for six clubs in the English and Scottish leagues. Sinclair played in one international game for Scotland, in 1966.

== Family ==
Several members of his family were involved in high-level football. His uncle Tommy Wright was a Scottish international. His brother Willie Sinclair, his son Chris Sinclair and his cousin Tommy Wright were also professional footballers.

== Playing career ==
=== Club career ===
He began his career at Dunfermline Athletic in his native Scotland, and moved south of the border to join Leicester City in May 1965.

In January 1968, Sinclair joined Newcastle United, where he became a member of the team that won the 1969 Fairs Cup. In December 1969, he was sold to Sheffield Wednesday, where he spent three-and-a-half seasons before finishing his career back in Scotland with his former club Dunfermline, and lastly Stenhousemuir.

=== International career ===
While at Leicester, Sinclair won his solitary cap for Scotland, appearing in a 1966 friendly match against Portugal.

== Death ==
Sinclair died in September 2010, aged 67, following a long battle with cancer. He was the first member of Newcastle's Fairs Cup winning side to die.
