= Chris Sinclair =

English footballer (born 1970)

Personal information
- Date of birth: 11 November 1970 (age 55)
- Place of birth: Sheffield, England
- Position: Winger

Youth career
- –: Sauchie Athletic

Senior career*
Years	Team	Apps	(Gls)
1989–1994	Dunfermline Athletic	34	(2)
1994–1997	Meadowbank Thistle / Livingston	49	(4)
1997–1999	Albion Rovers	34	(2)
Total		117	(8)
- * Club domestic league appearances and goals

Chris Sinclair (born 11 November 1970) is a former professional footballer who played as a winger.

== Early and personal life ==
His father Jackie and uncle Willie Sinclair were also professional footballers, as were his father's uncle Tommy Wright, Sr. and cousin Tommy Wright Jr.

== Career ==
After playing youth football with Sauchie Athletic, Sinclair began his senior career at Dunfermline Athletic, making 34 league appearances between 1989 and 1994. Sinclair's next club was Meadowbank Thistle, but he moved along with the club when it relocated to Livingston in 1995. In total he made 49 league appearances over three seasons. Sinclair's final club was Albion Rovers, where he spent a further two seasons, making 34 league appearances.
