= Willie Miller (footballer, born 1969) =

Scottish footballer

Personal information
- Full name: William Nesbit Miller
- Date of birth: 1 November 1969 (age 56)
- Place of birth: Edinburgh, Scotland
- Position: Defender

Youth career
- 1986–1987: Edina Hibs BC
- 1987–1990: Hibernian

Senior career*
Years	Team	Apps	(Gls)
1990–1998	Hibernian	244	(2)
1998–2002	Dundee	39	(0)
2001	→ Wrexham (loan)	5	(0)
2002	Raith Rovers	3	(0)
2002–2003	Cowdenbeath	19	(0)
Total		310	(2)

International career
1989–1992	Scotland U21	10	(0)
- * Club domestic league appearances and goals

Willie Miller (born 1 November 1969) is a Scottish former footballer. He began and spent most of his career with Hibernian, for whom he played in nearly 250 league games. Miller won the 1991 Scottish League Cup Final with Hibs. He also played in the 1993 Scottish League Cup Final, which Hibs lost 2–1 to Rangers.

After leaving Hibs in 1998, he played for Dundee, Wrexham (on loan), Raith Rovers and Cowdenbeath. Miller retired from senior football in 2003.

Miller won ten caps for Scotland at under–21 level.
