= Graeme Miller (footballer) =

Scottish footballer

Personal information
- Date of birth: 21 February 1973 (age 53)
- Place of birth: Glasgow, Scotland
- Position: Striker

Youth career
- 1990–1992: Tynecastle

Senior career*
Years	Team	Apps	(Gls)
1992–1996	Hibernian	2	(0)
1996–1997	Berwick Rangers	7	(1)
1997	Edinburgh United	?	(?)
Total		9	(1)
- * Club domestic league appearances and goals

Graeme Miller (born 21 February 1973) is a Scottish former professional footballer who played as a striker.

== Career ==
Born in Glasgow, Miller began his career with Tynecastle, before turning professional with Hibernian in 1992. He later played for Berwick Rangers, making a total of 9 appearances in the Scottish Football League for both clubs, before dropping down to junior football to play with Edinburgh United.

== Personal life ==
His father Alex and brother Greg have also been professional footballers.
