= Greg Miller (footballer, born 1976) =

Scottish footballer

Personal information
- Date of birth: 1 April 1976 (age 50)
- Place of birth: Glasgow, Scotland
- Position: Midfielder

Team information
- Current team: Portsmouth U18 (manager)

Youth career
- 1993–1995: Hutchison Vale

Senior career*
Years	Team	Apps	(Gls)
1995–1997	Hibernian	15	(1)
1997–1998	Livingston	5	(0)
1998–1999	Motherwell	4	(0)
1999–2000	Clydebank	35	(2)
2000–2004	Brechin City	89	(2)
2004–2006	Arbroath	50	(2)
Total		198	(7)

Managerial career
- 2006–2008: Cove Rangers (under-20 manager)
- 2009: JEF United Chiba (assistant)
- 2012–2017: Scotland Youth (assistant)
- 2017–2020: Barnsley Youth (assistant)
- 2021–: Portsmouth U18
- * Club domestic league appearances and goals

Greg Miller (born 1 April 1976 in Glasgow) is a Scottish former professional footballer who played as a midfielder and is currently manager of Portsmouth U18.

== Career ==
Miller began his career with Hutchison Vale before turning professional in 1995 with Hibernian. Over the next two seasons, Miller made 15 appearances in the Scottish Football League, scoring one goal. Miller's next team was Livingston, where he made just five League appearances. Miller moved to Motherwell in 1998, making a further 4 League appearances. After just one season, Miller signed for Clydebank, making scoring 2 goals in 35 League appearances over the next year. Miller's next club was Brechin City, where he spent four years, making 89 League appearances. Miller moved to Arbroath in 2004, making 50 League appearances over the next two seasons.

He retired from professional football in 2006 to become a coach at first club Hibernian. Since leaving Hibs in 2006, he has held coaching roles in Scotland, England and Japan. Portsmouth U18 appointed him as manager in 2021.

== Personal life ==
His father Alex and brother Graeme have also been professional footballers.
