= Dave Beaumont =

Scottish footballer

Personal information
- Full name: David Alan Beaumont
- Date of birth: 10 December 1963 (age 62)
- Place of birth: Edinburgh, Scotland
- Position: Defender

Youth career
- Dundee United

Senior career*
Years	Team	Apps	(Gls)
1978–1989	Dundee United	87	(3)
1989–1991	Luton Town	76	(0)
1991–1994	Hibernian	70	(2)

International career
1982	Scotland U18		
1983	Scotland U20		
1984–1985	Scotland U21	2	(0)
Medal record
Scotland
UEFA European U-18 Championship
Winner	1982 Finland	Team competition
- * Club domestic league appearances and goals

David Alan Beaumont (born 10 December 1963 in Edinburgh) is a Scottish retired footballer who played for Dundee United, Luton Town and Hibernian.

As a youth, Beaumont won the Under-18 European Championship with Scotland in 1982 and reached the quarter-finals of the subsequent Under-20 World Championship in 1983. A versatile defensive midfielder, Beaumont made the breakthrough into the Dundee United first team during the 1983–84 season, but found it hard to get a regular spot in a defence with a back four of Malpas, Gough, Hegarty and Narey. He was used as cover for all four, and appeared as a defensive midfielder occasionally over the next couple of seasons.

Beaumont spent nearly half of the 1986–87 season in the starting eleven, his best run in the first team, making 40 appearances, and played in six matches of United's UEFA Cup run that season, including an appearance as substitute for Paul Sturrock in the first leg of the final. Beaumont left United in January 1989 for Luton Town, for whom he appeared in the 1989 Football League Cup Final.

He returned to Scotland with Hibernian in October 1991. Weeks later, he was an unused substitute as they beat Dunfermline Athletic in the 1991 Scottish League Cup Final. Injuries hampered him after this, however, and he was forced to quit the senior game in 1994. Beaumont became a police officer in Fife, playing for the Scottish Police team.

== Honours ==
Dundee United

- UEFA Cup runner-up: 1986–87

Luton Town

- Football League Cup runner-up: 1988–89

Hibernian

- Scottish League Cup: 1991–92

Scotland Under-19s

- UEFA U18 European Championship: 1982
