= Mark McGraw =

Scottish footballer

Personal information
- Date of birth: 5 January 1971 (age 55)
- Place of birth: Rutherglen, Scotland
- Height: 5 ft 11 in (1.80 m)
- Position: Forward

Youth career
- Port Glasgow

Senior career*
Years	Team	Apps	(Gls)
1988–1990	Greenock Morton	12	(3)
1990–1995	Hibernian	49	(3)
1995–1997	Falkirk	40	(8)
1997–1998	Greenock Morton	13	(0)
1998–2000	Clyde	20	(7)
2000–2001	Stirling Albion	3	(0)
2001	Forfar Athletic	5	(0)
Total		142	(21)
- * Club domestic league appearances and goals

Mark McGraw (born 5 January 1971) is a Scottish former footballer, who played as a forward.

McGraw played for Greenock Morton, Hibernian, Falkirk, Clyde, Stirling Albion and Forfar Athletic. He played for Morton when his father, Allan McGraw, was the manager there.
