= Chris Jackson (Scottish footballer) =

Scottish footballer

Personal information
- Full name: Chris Baller Jackson
- Date of birth: 29 October 1973 (age 53)
- Place of birth: Edinburgh, Scotland
- Height: 5 ft 9 in (1.75 m)
- Position: Midfielder

Youth career
- Salvesen Boys Club

Senior career*
Years	Team	Apps	(Gls)
1992–1998	Hibernian	70	(2)
1998–1999	Stirling Albion	22	(1)
1999	Cowdenbeath	5	(0)
1999–2000	Clydebank	5	(0)
2000	Montrose	1	(0)
2000	East Fife	11	(0)
2001–2002	Stenhousemuir	45	(1)
2002–2005	Brechin City	43	(0)
2005–2006	Arbroath	18	(0)
Total		220	(4)
- * Club domestic league appearances and goals

Chris Jackson (born 29 October 1973) is a Scottish footballer, who played for Hibernian, Stirling Albion, Cowdenbeath, Clydebank, Montrose, East Fife, Stenhousemuir, Brechin City and Arbroath.
