= Tommy Wright (footballer, born 1928) =

Scottish footballer

Personal information
- Full name: Thomas Wright
- Date of birth: 20 January 1928
- Place of birth: Clackmannan, Scotland
- Date of death: 5 May 2011 (aged 83)
- Place of death: Sunderland, England
- Position: Right winger

Youth career
- Blairhall Colliery

Senior career*
Years	Team	Apps	(Gls)
1946–1949	Partick Thistle	35	(20)
1949–1955	Sunderland	170	(52)
1955–1957	East Fife	36	(18)
1957	Oldham Athletic	7	(2)
- North Shields
Total		248	(92)

International career
1952–1953	Scotland	3	(0)
- * Club domestic league appearances and goals

Thomas Wright (20 January 1928 – 5 May 2011) was a Scottish footballer who played for Sunderland and the Scotland national football team as a midfielder.

== Club career ==
He started his professional footballing career with Partick Thistle, where he made 35 appearances scoring 20 goals ranging from 1946 until 1949. From Partick Thistle, he joined Sunderland in 1949, and made his debut on 12 March 1949 against Portsmouth in a 4–1 defeat at Roker Park. He was part of the Sunderland team that finished third in the 1949–50 season and played regularly. Overall, in his Sunderland career he scored 51 goals in 170 league appearances, before moving to East Fife in 1955, in a deal seeing Charlie Fleming going the other way. He made 36 appearances scoring 18 goals during 1955 to 1957 at his time at East Fife. He then moved to Oldham Athletic in 1957 where he made 7 appearances and scored 2 goals in a single season. He then moved on a short spell to North Shields before retiring in 1957.

== International career ==
Wright won his first international cap for Scotland against Wales in a 2–1 on 18 October 1952 at Ninian Park. He won two further caps for his country, making it three in total, without scoring a goal. A regular at the "Whitegates Comrie" until he was taken to a retirement home in Sunderland.
