= David Fellenger =

Scottish former footballer (born 1969)

Personal information
- Date of birth: 6 June 1969 (age 57)
- Place of birth: Edinburgh, Scotland
- Position: Midfielder

Youth career
- Hutchison Vale B.C.

Senior career*
Years	Team	Apps	(Gls)
1988–1994	Hibernian	37	(4)
1994–1995	Cowdenbeath	24	(0)
Total		61	(62)
- * Club domestic league appearances and goals

David Fellenger (born 6 June 1969) is a Scottish former footballer, who played as a midfielder for Hibernian and Cowdenbeath.
