= David Farrell (footballer, born 1969) =

Scottish footballer, coach, and writer

Personal information
- Date of birth: 29 October 1969 (age 56)
- Place of birth: Glasgow, Scotland
- Position: Defender

Youth career
- Oxford United

Senior career*
Years	Team	Apps	(Gls)
1988–1995	Hibernian	82	(2)
1995–1997	Partick Thistle	42	(2)
1997–2000	Airdrieonians	54	(2)
2000	Clydebank	1	(0)
2000–2003	Stranraer	53	(3)
2003–2004	Albion Rovers	17	(1)
Total		249	(10)

Managerial career
- 2008: Dundee (caretaker)
- * Club domestic league appearances and goals

David Farrell (born 29 October 1969) is a former Scottish football player, coach and writer. He now works a taxi driver around Glasgow.

== Playing career ==
Farrell was a midfielder and central defender who spent seven years at Hibernian FC. Following his departure from Hibs, Farrell led a nomadic playing career, with spells at Partick Thistle, Airdrie, Clydebank, Stranraer and Albion Rovers.

== Coaching career ==
After his playing career was over Farrell moved into coaching, working for Gretna's youth setup and Clyde. When his lifelong friend Alex Rae was appointed manager of Dundee in 2006, he appointed Farrell as his assistant. The club finished third and then second in the First Division, failing to win promotion back to the Scottish Premier League. After Rae was sacked in October 2008, Farrell was put in caretaker charge for the league game against Morton on 25 October before leaving the club himself on 30 October.

Farrell was appointed first team coach at Notts County. in November 2010 but left the club the following year following the departure of manager Paul Ince. A spell as assistant manager to Willie McStay at Celtic Nation followed but the pair resigned when the club was plunged into financial turmoil in 2014.

In January 2016, Farrell joined St Mirren as assistant manager to Alex Rae, who he previously worked with while at Dundee. Rae and Farrell were sacked by St Mirren after a bad start to the 2016/17 season.

== Writing ==
Farrell began writing a popular blog, Football From The Inside, in August 2014 and it was announced on 6 February 2015 that he had signed a deal with Teckle Books to publish a book about his life in football

== Other ==
Farrell appeared on 4 May 2017 episode of the Channel Four quiz show Fifteen to One.
