= Tommy McIntyre =

Scottish footballer and coach

Personal information
- Date of birth: 26 December 1963 (age 62)
- Place of birth: Bellshill, Scotland
- Position: Defender

Team information
- Current team: Celtic (B manager)

Senior career*
Years	Team	Apps	(Gls)
1983–1986	Aberdeen	19	(0)
1986–1994	Hibernian	126	(9)
1994–1997	Airdrieonians	41	(2)
Total		186	(11)

Managerial career
- Celtic B
- * Club domestic league appearances and goals

Tommy McIntyre (born 26 December 1963) is a Scottish professional football coach and a former player, who played for Aberdeen, Hibernian and Airdrieonians in the 1980s and 1990s. He was most recently the manager of the B squad of Celtic.

McIntyre began his career at Aberdeen but left them to join Hibernian in 1986. He soon became an important part of Alex Miller's side, winning the Scottish League Cup in 1991 and made over 100 league appearances for the club. He scored the opening goal in the 1991 Scottish League Cup Final with a penalty kick.

After retiring as a player, McIntyre was employed by the Scottish Football Association as their head of youth development and assistant technical director. He left the latter position on 1 July 2009 to become the new head of Celtic's Professional Academy.
