= Graham Mitchell (Scottish footballer) =

Scottish footballer

Personal information
- Date of birth: 2 November 1962 (age 63)
- Place of birth: Glasgow, Scotland
- Position: Defender

Senior career*
Years	Team	Apps	(Gls)
1980–1986	Hamilton Academical	179	(9)
1986–1996	Hibernian	265	(4)
1996–1997	Falkirk	20	(1)
Total		464	(14)
- * Club domestic league appearances and goals

Graham Mitchell (born 2 November 1962) is a Scottish former professional football player who played for Hamilton Academical, Hibernian, and Falkirk in the 1980s and 1990s.

Mitchell began his career at Hamilton Academical, making over 175 league appearances before joining Hibernian in 1986. A natural left footer who soon became an important part of Alex Miller's side, winning the Scottish League Cup 1991–92, and went on to make over 250 league appearances for the club.
