= Steven Tweed =

Scottish footballer and manager

Personal information
- Full name: Steven Tweed
- Date of birth: 8 August 1972 (age 54)
- Place of birth: Edinburgh, Scotland
- Position: Defender

Senior career*
Years	Team	Apps	(Gls)
1991–1996	Hibernian	108	(6)
1996–1997	Ionikos	2	(0)
1997–1998	Stoke City	38	(0)
1998–2001	Dundee	76	(4)
2001–2004	MSV Duisburg	50	(0)
2004–2006	Yokohama FC	83	(8)
2006–2008	Livingston	28	(1)
2007–2008	→ East Fife (loan)	31	(2)
2008–2009	East Fife	16	(1)
2009–2011	Montrose	52	(3)
2011	Broughty Athletic	17	(3)
Total		501	(28)

International career
1993	Scotland U21	3	(0)
1995	Scotland B	2	(1)

Managerial career
- 2009–2011: Montrose
- * Club domestic league appearances and goals

Steven Tweed (born 8 August 1972) is a Scottish former footballer and manager.

Tweed started his career in Scotland with Hibernian, for whom he made over 100 league appearances. He made his first move abroad in 1996 when he joined Greek side Ionikos. Tweed then returned to the UK with Stoke City and then Dundee. He then played for German side MSV Duisburg and Japanese outfit Yokohama before returning to Scotland with Livingston, East Fife and ended his career with Montrose he was manager of Montrose for two years.

== Career ==
Tweed was born in Edinburgh and began his career with Hibernian making his debut in the 1991–92 season. He became a regular under Alex Miller making 126 appearances for Hibs scoring five goals in five seasons at Easter Road. Tweed played twice for Scotland at B international level in 1995, featuring in wins against Northern Ireland and Sweden. He left Hibernian in 1996–97 to play for Greek Alpha Ethniki side Ionikos. However he did no have a good time in Nikaia playing under Oleg Blokhin, Sokratis Gemelos and Jacek Gmoch saw him make just two appearances for "Galanolefki". He returned to Britain in the summer of 1997 signing for English club Stoke City. Stoke had an awful 1997–98 campaign which saw them relegated to the third tier with Tweed playing in 44 matches that season. He failed to get in the side under Brian Little in 1998–99 and returned to Scotland in March 1998 joining Dundee. Tweed spent three seasons at Dens Park before moving abroad again in 2001, signing for German 2. Bundesliga club MSV Duisburg. After two seasons at Wedaustadion he then moved to J2 League club Yokohama FC in 2004. He spent three seasons at the Nippatsu Mitsuzawa Stadium before returning to Scotland with First Division club Livingston in 2006 where he spent the 2006–07 season. Tweed then moved to East Fife in 2007, initially on loan and then permanently.

In January 2009, he was appointed player-manager of Montrose. Montrose narrowly missed out on a play-off place in the last game of the 2008–09 season. During the 2009 close season, Tweed introduced 12 new players, with Jim Moffatt (assistant) and Tony Bullock (goalkeeping) helping with coaching. Montrose endured a winless streak in the league lasting until mid January. A bright spot of the 2009–10 season was a Scottish Cup run, which ended in a 5–1 defeat to Hibernian. Tweed won the SFL Manager of the Month award for March 2010. He resigned in March 2011 due to work and family commitments. On 17 June 2011, Steven Tweed joined Broughty Athletic a Scottish junior football club, he stayed until 17 December 2011 when he left the club.

== Personal life ==
Tweed, a former Hibs player, is the nephew of Hearts legend Tommy Walker.

== Club statistics ==
Club	Season	League			FA Cup		League Cup		Other^{[A]}		Total	
Club	Season	Division	Apps	Goals	Apps	Goals	Apps	Goals	Apps	Goals	Apps	Goals
Hibernian	1991–92	Scottish Premier Division	1	0	0	0	0	0	0	0	1	0
Hibernian	1992–93	Scottish Premier Division	14	0	2	1	0	0	0	0	16	1
Hibernian	1993–94	Scottish Premier Division	29	3	2	0	4	0	0	0	35	3
Hibernian	1994–95	Scottish Premier Division	33	0	5	0	3	1	0	0	41	1
Hibernian	1995–96	Scottish Premier Division	31	0	0	0	2	0	0	0	33	0
Ionikos	1996–97	Alpha Ethniki	2	0	0	0	0	0	0	0	2	0
Stoke City	1997–98	First Division	38	0	1	0	5	0	0	0	44	0
Stoke City	1998–99	Second Division	1	0	1	0	0	0	1	0	3	0
Dundee	1998–99	Scottish Premier League	10	1	1	0	0	0	0	0	11	1
Dundee	1999–2000	Scottish Premier League	34	2	2	0	3	0	0	0	39	2
Dundee	2000–01	Scottish Premier League	32	1	4	0	2	0	0	0	38	1
MSV Duisburg	2001–02	2. Bundesliga	25	0	0	0	0	0	0	0	25	0
MSV Duisburg	2002–03	2. Bundesliga	24	0	0	0	0	0	0	0	24	0
MSV Duisburg	2003–04	2. Bundesliga	1	0	0	0	0	0	0	0	1	0
Yokohama FC	2004	J2 League	39	3	0	0	0	0	0	0	39	3
Yokohama FC	2005	J2 League	31	3	0	0	0	0	0	0	31	3
Yokohama FC	2006	J2 League	13	2	0	0	0	0	0	0	13	2
Livingston	2006–07	Scottish First Division	28	1	2	1	2	0	1	0	33	2
East Fife	2007–08	Scottish Third Division	32	2	2	0	2	0	1	0	37	2
East Fife	2008–09	Scottish Second Division	16	1	0	0	0	0	0	0	16	1
Montrose	2008–09	Scottish Third Division	16	2	0	0	0	0	0	0	16	2
Montrose	2009–10	Scottish Third Division	31	1	1	0	0	0	0	0	32	1
Montrose	2010–11	Scottish Third Division	6	0	2	0	0	0	0	0	8	0
Career Total			487	22	25	2	23	1	3	0	538	25

A. The "Other" column constitutes appearances and goals in the Football League Trophy and Scottish Challenge Cup, .
