= 1991–92 Scottish League Cup =

1991–92 Skol Cup
Tournament details
- Country: Scotland

Final positions
- Champions: Hibernian
- Runners-up: Dunfermline Athletic

The 1991–92 Scottish League Cup was the 46th staging of Scotland's second most prestigious football knockout competition. The competition was sponsored by Skol and was also known as the Skol Cup.

The competition was won by Hibs, who defeated Dunfermline Athletic 2–0 in the final at Hampden Park. This meant that Hibs won their first major trophy since winning the same competition in 1972. It marked a great turnaround in Hibs' fortunes since the summer of 1990, when the very existence of the club had been threatened by a takeover bid made by Wallace Mercer, who had intended to merge Hibs with Hearts. This period was later covered by an episode of the BBC documentary That Was The Team That Was, which revealed that Hibs player Murdo MacLeod had placed a bet on his team winning the cup.

== First round ==
Home team	Score	Away team
Berwick Rangers	0–1	Dumbarton
Alloa Athletic	(p)0 – 0	Stranraer
East Fife	2 – 2(p)	East Stirlingshire
Queen of the South	0–4	Albion Rovers
Queen's Park	4–2	Stenhousemuir
Cowdenbeath	1–0	Arbroath

== Second round ==
Home team	Score	Away team
Cowdenbeath	0–1	Kilmarnock
Clyde	0–4	Aberdeen
Dundee	2–4	Ayr United
Meadowbank Thistle	0–2	St Johnstone
Greenock Morton	2–4	Celtic
Brechin City	3 – 3(p)	St Mirren
Dumbarton	1–2	Airdrieonians
Dundee United	3–2	Montrose
Dunfermline Athletic	4–1	Alloa Athletic
Falkirk	3–0	East Stirlingshire
Hamilton Academical	2–0	Forfar Athletic
Heart of Midlothian	3–0	Clydebank
Partick Thistle	2–0	Albion Rovers
Raith Rovers	4–1	Motherwell
Rangers	6–0	Queen's Park
Stirling Albion	0–3	Hibernian

== Third round ==
Home team	Score	Away team
Aberdeen	0–1	Airdrieonians
Dunfermline Athletic	(p)1 – 1	St Mirren
Ayr United	2–0	St Johnstone
Celtic	3–1	Raith Rovers
Dundee United	1–0	Falkirk
Hamilton Academical	0–2	Heart of Midlothian
Kilmarnock	2–3	Hibernian
Partick Thistle	0–2	Rangers

== Quarter-final ==
Home team	Score	Away team
Heart of Midlothian	0–1	Rangers
Airdrieonians	(p)0 – 0	Celtic
Ayr United	0–2	Hibernian
Dunfermline Athletic	3–1	Dundee United

== Semi-final ==
24 September 1991

Dunfermline Athletic	1–1 (a.e.t.)	Airdrieonians
McWilliams (pen.)		Coyle
Penalties
	3–2

Tynecastle Stadium, Edinburgh
Attendance: 10,662
Referee: David Syme

25 September 1991

Hibernian	1–0	Rangers
Wright 29'

Hampden Park, Glasgow
Attendance: 40,901

== Final ==
27 October 1991

Hibernian	2–0	Dunfermline Athletic
McIntyre 49' (pen.); Wright 86'

Hampden Park, Glasgow
Attendance: 40,377
Referee: Brian McGinlay
