= Graeme Donald =

Scottish footballer

Personal information
- Date of birth: 14 April 1974 (age 52)
- Place of birth: Stirling, Scotland
- Position: Defender

Youth career
- Gairdoch United

Senior career*
Years	Team	Apps	(Gls)
1991–1998	Hibernian	43	(5)
1998–2001	Stirling Albion	93	(8)
2001–2002	Stenhousemuir	23	(5)
Total		159	(18)

International career
1992	Scotland U21	3	(0)
- * Club domestic league appearances and goals

Graeme Donald (born 14 April 1974) is a Scottish former footballer.
