= Kevin McAllister =

Scottish footballer (born 1962)

Personal information
- Date of birth: 8 November 1962 (age 64)
- Place of birth: Falkirk, Scotland
- Height: 5 ft 5 in (1.65 m)
- Position: Winger

Youth career
- Camelon

Senior career*
Years	Team	Apps	(Gls)
1983–1985	Falkirk	64	(18)
1985–1991	Chelsea	106	(7)
1987–1988	→ Falkirk (loan)	6	(3)
1991–1993	Falkirk	82	(12)
1993–1997	Hibernian	109	(12)
1997–2002	Falkirk	150	(19)
2002–2004	Albion Rovers	48	(1)
Total		565	(72)

Managerial career
- 2003–2005: Albion Rovers
- * Club domestic league appearances and goals

Kevin McAllister (born 8 November 1962) is a Scottish former footballer.

== Career ==
A winger, he started out in the Junior grade at local club Camelon and began his professional career with Falkirk, with whom he spent ten years over three spells, as well as one spell on loan. He played in the 1997 Scottish Cup Final which the Bairns lost 1–0 to Kilmarnock.

McAllister also played for Chelsea, (where he was among a large contingent of Scottish players and won the Full Members' Cup in 1986 and 1990) Hibernian (being runner-up in the 1993 Scottish League Cup Final) and Albion Rovers. Nicknamed 'Crunchie', he was voted by Falkirk fans as their "Player of the Millennium".

McAllister was later manager of Albion Rovers in the fourth tier of Scottish football from 2003–04 until 2004–05, the first of those seasons as player-manager.

In 2022, McAllister's contribution to Falkirk was marked with the renaming of the South Stand in his honour. Commenting on the achievement, he said "When I was a kid I just wanted to play for Falkirk as they were my team. Having a stand named after me and all that was never on the agenda. I spoke to a few people, ex-team-mates and managers and they told me what an honour it was so I agreed to it."

== Honours ==
Chelsea

- Football League Second Division: 1988–89
- Full Members' Cup: 1985–86, 1989–90
