= Brian Hamilton (footballer) =

Scottish footballer

Personal information
- Full name: Brian Hamilton
- Date of birth: 5 August 1967 (age 59)
- Place of birth: Paisley, Scotland
- Height: 6 ft 0 in (1.83 m)
- Position: Midfielder

Senior career*
Years	Team	Apps	(Gls)
1985–1989	St Mirren	87	(4)
1989–1995	Hibernian	195	(9)
1995–1996	Heart of Midlothian	25	(2)
1996–1999	Falkirk	48	(3)
1999	Stranraer	1	(0)
1999	Ayr United	3	(0)
1999–2000	Canberra Cosmos	27	(1)
2000	Clydebank	15	(2)
2000–2001	Partick Thistle	16	(0)
2001–2002	Clydebank	27	(0)
Total		444	(21)

International career
1988–1989	Scotland U21	4	(0)
- * Club domestic league appearances and goals

Brian Hamilton (born 5 August 1967) is a Scottish retired footballer, who played for both Hibernian and Heart of Midlothian as a midfielder. He was part of the Hibernian side that won the 1991 Scottish League Cup Final, and part of the St Mirren side that won the 1987 Scottish Cup Final.
