= Pat McGinlay =

Scottish footballer (born 1967)

Personal information
- Date of birth: 30 May 1967 (age 59)
- Place of birth: Partick, Scotland
- Height: 5 ft 9 in (1.75 m)
- Position: Midfielder

Youth career
- 1985–1986: Blackpool

Senior career*
Years	Team	Apps	(Gls)
1986–1987	Blackpool	1	(0)
1987–1993	Hibernian	145	(23)
1993–1994	Celtic	49	(11)
1994–2000	Hibernian	176	(39)
2000–2005	Ayr United	61	(18)
Total		432	(91)

International career
1995	Scotland B	1	(0)
- * Club domestic league appearances and goals

Patrick McGinlay (born 30 May 1967) is a Scottish former professional footballer who played as a midfielder and is best known for his two spells at Hibernian.

McGinlay grew up in the Partick area of Glasgow and was an outstanding schoolboy player, captaining St Peter's Boys School in Partick and playing for St Thomas Aquinas Secondary School in Jordanhill and Bearsden Boys Club. Though many Scottish clubs were watching his performances as a centre forward, he began his career as an apprentice with English club Blackpool but returned to Scotland to join Hibernian in 1987. After two years on the fringes he became an important part of the team under manager Alex Miller, who played McGinlay as a midfielder instead of a forward/winger. He was in the Hibs side that won the Scottish League Cup in 1991, and went on to make over 150 appearances in his first stint at Easter Road.

In 1993, he was signed by Celtic, the club he supported as a child, for a fee of £525,000 after he impressed then boss Liam Brady. He made his debut on 7 August 1993 as a substitute in a 2–2 draw away to Motherwell. However, after just over fifteen months he was on the move again as he was not part of new manager Tommy Burns's plans, in spite of McGinlay being Celtic's top goalscorer in the previous season. With the cash raised from selling McGinlay, Burns bought Tosh McKinlay – one of McGinlay's old St Peters Boys teammates – from Hearts.

McGinlay rejoined Hibs for a fee of £420,000 on 1 November 1994. He remained at Easter Road for six seasons, experiencing a relegation followed by a promotion before moving to Ayr United. Whilst at Ayr, McGinlay enjoyed a cup run which ended with him being on the losing side in the 2002 Scottish League Cup Final. He made 74 appearances in all competitions for the Honest Men and scored 23 goals before retiring in 2005. He later operated a cleaning business in Cambuslang with his wife Margaret.

McGinlay represented Scotland B once, in a 3–0 win against Northern Ireland B at his club ground Easter Road in 1995.
