= Gareth Evans (footballer, born 1967) =

English footballer and coach

Personal information
- Full name: Gareth John Evans
- Date of birth: 14 January 1967 (age 59)
- Place of birth: Coventry, England
- Height: 5 ft 8 in (1.73 m)
- Position: Forward

Senior career*
Years	Team	Apps	(Gls)
1985–1986	Coventry City	7	(0)
1986–1988	Rotherham United	63	(13)
1988–1996	Hibernian	257	(30)
1990	→ Stoke City (loan)	5	(1)
1990–1991	→ Northampton Town (loan)	2	(0)
1996–1998	Partick Thistle	49	(14)
1998–2000	Airdrieonians	54	(10)
2000–2004	Alloa Athletic	52	(4)
Total		489	(72)

Managerial career
- 2011: Hibernian (caretaker)
- 2012–2013: Livingston (caretaker)
- 2013–2017: Scotland U19 women
- * Club domestic league appearances and goals

Gareth John Evans (born 14 January 1967) is an English football player and coach. He played for Coventry City, Rotherham United, Hibernian, Stoke City, Northampton Town, Partick Thistle, Airdrie and Alloa Athletic. Evans has been the caretaker manager of Hibernian and Livingston, and was head coach of the Scotland women's under-19 national team for four years.

== Career ==
Evans was born in Coventry and played for his local club Coventry City making ten appearances for the "Sky Blues" in two seasons before dropping down to the Third Division to play for Rotherham United. At Millmoor Evans played 39 times in 1986–87 scoring 11 goals as the "Millers" finished in a mid-table position of 14th however a poor season under John Breckin and Dave Cusack saw Rotherham relegated to the Fourth Division. With Rotherham heading for relegation Evans moved to Scottish Scottish Premier Division side Hibernian.

It was at Easter Road where Evans enjoyed the most success in his career where he spent nine seasons. In total he played 301 matches for Hibs scoring 37 goals helping the Edinburgh side to lift the Scottish League Cup in 1991. In the 1990–91 season Evans spent time out on loan at Stoke City where he played seven times scoring twice, which came in a 1–0 win over Bolton Wanderers and in a 2–1 defeat against West Ham United in the Football League Cup. In the same season he also played twice for Northampton Town.

After leaving Hibernian in 1996 Evans continued to play in Scotland, initially signing for Partick Thistle. He then joined Airdrieonians in 1998 and Alloa Athletic in 2000.

== Managerial career ==
After ending his playing career in 2004, he joined the Alloa Athletic coaching staff. He eventually became assistant manager, before taking a similar position at Brechin City, where he assisted former Hibs teammate Michael O'Neill. Evans then moved back into full-time football in 2007 by accepting the position of reserve team coach at Hibs. Following the departure of John Hughes on 4 October 2010, Evans was appointed caretaker manager at Hibernian alongside fellow coach Alistair Stevenson. Evans left Hibernian in November 2011, as new manager Pat Fenlon assembled his coaching staff.

Livingston appointed Evans as first team coach in July 2012. After John Hughes left Livingston to manage Hartlepool United in November, Evans and Richie Burke were placed in caretaker charge of the team. Evans left the club on 28 February 2013.

Evans was appointed as Scotland women's under-19 national coach in June 2013. He left this position in August 2017. He was appointed as Head of Youth by Hibernian Football Club on 24 September 2018.

== Career statistics ==
=== As a player ===
Appearances and goals by club, season and competition
Club	Season	League			FA Cup		League Cup		Other^{[A]}		Total	
Club	Season	Division	Apps	Goals	Apps	Goals	Apps	Goals	Apps	Goals	Apps	Goals
Coventry City	1985–86	First Division	6	0	0	0	1	1	2	0	9	1
Coventry City	1986–87	First Division	1	0	0	0	0	0	0	0	1	0
Coventry City	Total		7	0	0	0	1	1	2	0	10	1
Rotherham United	1986–87	Third Division	34	9	3	1	0	0	2	1	39	11
Rotherham United	1987–88	Third Division	29	4	3	0	4	3	2	0	38	7
Rotherham United	Total		63	13	6	1	4	3	4	1	77	18
Hibernian	1987–88	Scottish Premier Division	12	2	2	0	0	0	0	0	14	2
Hibernian	1988–89	Scottish Premier Division	35	5	4	0	3	1	0	0	42	6
Hibernian	1989–90	Scottish Premier Division	28	3	1	0	2	0	4	1	35	4
Hibernian	1990–91	Scottish Premier Division	15	2	0	0	2	0	0	0	17	2
Hibernian	1991–92	Scottish Premier Division	41	6	3	1	4	1	0	0	48	8
Hibernian	1992–93	Scottish Premier Division	39	6	4	0	2	2	2	0	47	8
Hibernian	1993–94	Scottish Premier Division	38	4	2	0	4	0	0	0	44	4
Hibernian	1994–95	Scottish Premier Division	26	0	2	0	3	2	0	0	29	2
Hibernian	1995–96	Scottish Premier Division	23	2	0	0	0	0	0	0	23	2
Hibernian	Total		257	30	18	1	20	6	6	1	301	38
Stoke City (loan)	1990–91	Third Division	5	1	0	0	2	1	0	0	7	2
Northampton Town (loan)	1990–91	Fourth Division	2	0	0	0	0	0	0	0	2	0
Partick Thistle	1996–97	Scottish First Division	29	9	0	0	3	3	0	0	32	12
Partick Thistle	1997–98	Scottish First Division	20	5	0	0	1	0	1	0	22	5
Partick Thistle	Total		49	14	0	0	4	3	1	0	54	17
Airdrieonians	1998–99	Scottish First Division	26	6	1	0	1	0	0	0	28	6
Airdrieonians	1999–2000	Scottish First Division	25	4	1	0	2	0	0	0	28	4
Airdrieonians	2000–01	Scottish First Division	3	0	0	0	2	0	1	0	6	0
Airdrieonians	Total		54	10	2	0	5	0	1	0	62	10
Alloa Athletic	2000–01	Scottish First Division	22	3	1	0	0	0	0	0	23	3
Alloa Athletic	2001–02	Scottish Second Division	10	0	3	2	1	0	5	2	19	4
Alloa Athletic	2002–03	Scottish First Division	14	1	1	0	2	0	1	0	18	1
Alloa Athletic	2003–04	Scottish Second Division	6	0	2	0	1	0	1	0	10	0
Alloa Athletic	Total		52	4	7	2	4	0	7	2	70	8
Career Total			489	72	33	4	40	14	21	4	583	94

A. The "Other" column constitutes appearances and goals in the Full Members Cup, Football League Trophy, Scottish Challenge Cup and UEFA Cup.

=== As a manager ===
As of 28 February 2013

Team	From	To	Record				
Team	From	To	G	W	D	L	Win %
Livingston	22 November 2012	28 February 2013	14	6	3	5	42.86
