= Mickey Weir =

Scottish footballer

Personal information
- Full name: Michael Graham Weir
- Date of birth: 16 January 1966 (age 60)
- Place of birth: Edinburgh, Scotland
- Position: Winger

Senior career*
Years	Team	Apps	(Gls)
1984–1987	Hibernian	48	(5)
1987	Luton Town	8	(0)
1987–1996	Hibernian	158	(25)
1996	→ Millwall (loan)	8	(0)
1996–1998	Motherwell	23	(6)
Total		245	(36)
- * Club domestic league appearances and goals

Michael Graham Weir (born 16 January 1966) is a Scottish former footballer, who played mainly for Hibernian as a winger. He was part of the Hibernian side that won the 1991 Scottish League Cup.

Weir signed for Hibernian from Portobello Thistle as a teenager. His role as an apprentice involved football training, but also maintenance of Easter Road, such as sweeping and painting.

Weir remained at Hibs until 1987, when he signed for Luton Town. He returned to Easter Road after only a few months and just eight appearances for the Hatters. He played a key role in Hibs' 1991 League Cup win against Dunfermline, winning the penalty kick that opened the scoring in the Final. He left in 1996 for a brief spell on loan to Millwall, before ending his playing career at Motherwell, where he also coached. Weir also had a spell coaching Cowdenbeath, but he was forced to retire from the game due to injury.
