= Darren Jackson (Scottish footballer) =

Scottish footballer (born 1966)

Personal information
- Full name: Darren Jackson
- Date of birth: 25 July 1966 (age 60)
- Place of birth: Edinburgh, Scotland
- Height: 5 ft 10 in (1.78 m)
- Position: Forward

Senior career*
Years	Team	Apps	(Gls)
1985–1986	Meadowbank Thistle	48	(22)
1986–1988	Newcastle United	69	(7)
1988–1992	Dundee United	87	(30)
1992–1997	Hibernian	173	(50)
1997–1999	Celtic	29	(3)
1998–1999	→ Coventry City (loan)	3	(0)
1999–2001	Heart of Midlothian	55	(7)
2001	→ Livingston (loan)	9	(1)
2001–2002	St Johnstone	9	(1)
2002	→ Clydebank (loan)	13	(2)
Total		495	(123)

International career
1995–1998	Scotland	28	(4)
1995	Scotland B	1	(1)
- * Club domestic league appearances and goals

Darren Jackson (born 25 July 1966) is a Scottish former professional footballer, who played predominantly as a forward. Jackson played for several clubs in Scotland and England, including Newcastle United, Dundee United, Hibernian, Celtic and Heart of Midlothian. Jackson played 28 times for Scotland and was selected in their 1998 FIFA World Cup squad.

Since retiring as a player, Jackson has worked as a football agent and coach.

== Playing career ==
=== Club ===
Jackson began his career with Broxburn Athletic and in 1985 joined Meadowbank Thistle in Edinburgh, while he worked full-time as a printer for George Stewarts in Edinburgh. Twenty-two league goals won him a move south. After 9 games at the outset of Meadowbank's 1986–87 league campaign he joined Newcastle United in October 1986. Jackson made his Newcastle debut as a substitute for Ian Stewart in a 2–1 defeat at home to Arsenal on Saturday 18 October 1986, in which he won a penalty for his side. In two years with the Magpies, Jackson scored seven goals.

He returned to Scotland in late 1988 with Dundee United. After being ruled out for six months of his first campaign with a broken ankle which initially went undetected, Jackson spent four years at Tannadice, picking up a 1990–91 Scottish Cup runners-up medal and finishing that season as the club's top scorer with 18 goals.

Jackson joined Hibernian in 1992. During his five years at Easter Road, he was a runner-up again, this time in the 1993–94 Scottish League Cup.

He moved to Celtic in 1997 as Wim Jansen's first signing, but soon had to be treated for hydrocephalus that required surgery in September 1997. He was playing again within three months as Celtic went on to win both the League and League Cup. The following season, Jackson fell out of favour and had a spell on loan with Coventry City. He scored Celtic's first official goal in the revamped UEFA Champions League competition in 1998.

He next joined his boyhood heroes Hearts. In July 2000, Jackson revealed he intended to move into management once his playing career finished. In October, he was barred from playing for Hearts due to the impending trigger of a clause enforcing a one-year extension to his contract, seeing him discuss a possible return to former club Dundee United. After United signed Charlie Miller instead, Jackson negotiated a deal to return to first-team action at Hearts, only to find himself surplus to requirements when Craig Levein was appointed three weeks later.

In January, Jackson joined Livingston on a month's loan, subsequently extending it until the end of the season. During this time, Hearts released him from his contract. After winning the First Division title with Livi, scoring one goal in the process against Falkirk, Jackson was not offered a permanent contract. He returned to the Premier League with St Johnstone on a one-year deal. Jackson made nine league appearances for Saints, scoring once against Dundee, before being allowed to join Clydebank on loan in January 2002, where scored a début goal in a 1–0 win.

=== International ===
Jackson won 28 caps for Scotland, scoring four goals. Making his début in March 1995, Jackson was also in the starting line-up for a fixture against Estonia in Tallinn in October 1996, but a scheduling dispute meant the home team did not adhere to a quickly-rearranged afternoon kick-off time, and the match was abandoned at kick-off with no caps awarded to the Scotland players; the fixture was re-arranged for the following February, but Jackson was not selected.

He was part of the Scotland squads for UEFA Euro 96 and the 1998 FIFA World Cup, playing in two of the World Cup matches. Jackson played two further games after the tournament, appearing in the UEFA Euro 2000 qualifying matches against Lithuania and Estonia.

== Agent and coach ==
Despite Jackson's earlier vow to move into management, he became an SFA agent representing players including fellow Scots Jackie McNamara, Mark Wilson and Steven Thompson. In February 2013, Jackson relinquished his agent status to join client and former Celtic teammate McNamara – recently appointed as manager of Dundee United – as a coach. While at the club, United lost the 2014 Scottish Cup and 2015 Scottish League Cup Finals. Jackson left Dundee United in September 2015, following McNamara's departure. Three months later he was declared bankrupt. He then served as assistant manager to Gary Locke at Raith Rovers, until both were sacked by the club in February 2017.

Jackson was appointed first team coach at St Mirren in June 2018, but left in September following the departure of manager Alan Stubbs.

== Career statistics ==
=== Club ===
Club	Season	League		Cup		Lg Cup		Other		Total	
Club	Season	Apps	Goals	Apps	Goals	Apps	Goals	Apps	Goals	Apps	Goals
Meadowbank Thistle	1985–86	39	17	1	1	3	1	–	–	43	19
Meadowbank Thistle	1986–87	9	5	–	–	1	0	–	–	10	5
Meadowbank Thistle	Total	48	22	1	1	4	1	–	–	53	24
Newcastle United	1986–87	23	3	2 (Note: Appearances in Full Members' Cup.)	0	–	–	1	0	26	3
Newcastle United	1987–88	31	2	3	1	3	1	–	–	37	4
Newcastle United	1988–89	15	2	–	–	2	0	3 (Note: 2 appearances in Football League Centenary Trophy; 1 appearance in Full Members' Cup.)	0	20	0
Newcastle United	Total	69	7	5	1	5	1	4	0	83	9
Dundee United	1988–89	1	0	–	–	–	–	–	–	1	0
Dundee United	1989–90	25	7	5	1	1	0	1 (Note: Appearances in UEFA Cup.)	0	32	8
Dundee United	1990–91	33	12	6	2	4	3	3	1	46	18
Dundee United	1991–92	28	11	2	0	1	0	–	–	31	11
Dundee United	Total	87	30	13	3	6	3	4	1	110	37
Hibernian	1992–93	36	13	4	1	1	0	2	1	43	15
Hibernian	1993–94	40	7	2	0	4	1	–	–	46	8
Hibernian	1994–95	30	10	5	1	3	0	–	–	38	11
Hibernian	1995–96	36	9	1	0	2	2	–	–	39	11
Hibernian	1996–97	30	11	4	1	3	0	2 (Note: Appearances in relegation play-offs.)	2	33	12
Hibernian	Total	173	50	16	3	13	3	4	3	206	59
Celtic	1997–98	23	3	3	1	2	1	3	1	31	6
Celtic	1998–99	6	0	–	–	1	0	7 (Note: 2 Appearances, 1 goal in UEFA Champions League (qualification round); 2 appearances in UEFA Cup.)	1	14	1
Celtic	Total	29	3	3	1	3	1	10	2	45	7
Coventry City (loan)	1998–99	3	0	–	–	–	–	–	–	3	0
Coventry City (loan)	Total	3	0	–	–	–	–	–	–	3	0
Heart of Midlothian	1998–99	9	1	–	–	–	–	–	–	9	1
Heart of Midlothian	1999–00	35	6	3	1	3	2	0	0	41	9
Heart of Midlothian	2000–01	11	0	0	0	1	0	2	1	14	1
Heart of Midlothian	Total	55	7	3	1	4	2	2	1	64	11
Livingston (loan)	2000–01	9	1	4	0	–	–	0	0	13	1
St Johnstone	2001–02	9	1	0	0	1	0	0	0	10	1
Clydebank (loan)	2001–02	13	2	0	0	–	–	0	0	13	2
Career total		495	123	45	10	36	11	24	7	600	151

=== International ===
Scotland national team
Year	Apps	Goals
1995	9	0
1996	5	1
1997	6	2
1998	8	1
Total	28	4

==== International goals ====
Scores and results list Scotland's goal tally first.

#	Date	Venue	Opponent	Score	Result	Competition
1	5 October 1996	Daugava Stadium, Riga, Latvia	Latvia	2–0	2–0	1998 WC Qualifying
2	1 June 1997	Ta' Qali Stadium, Ta' Qali, Malta	Malta	2–1	3–2	Friendly
3	1 June 1997	Ta' Qali Stadium, Ta' Qali, Malta	Malta	3–2	3–2	Friendly
4	22 April 1998	Easter Road, Edinburgh, Scotland	Finland	1–0	1–1	Friendly

== Honours ==
Dundee United

- Scottish Cup runner-up: 1990–91

Hibernian

- Scottish League Cup runner-up: 1993–94

Celtic

- Scottish Premier Division: 1997–98

Livingston

- Scottish First Division (2nd tier): 2000–01
