= Alex Miller =

Scottish footballer and manager

Personal information
- Date of birth: 4 July 1949 (age 77)
- Place of birth: Glasgow, Scotland
- Position: Defender

Youth career
- Clydebank Strollers
- 1967–1968: Rangers

Senior career*
Years	Team	Apps	(Gls)
1968–1982	Rangers	197	(17)
1983	South China		
1983	Morton	8	(1)
Total		205	(18)

Managerial career
- 1983: South China
- 1983: Morton
- 1983–1986: St Mirren
- 1986–1996: Hibernian
- 1997–1998: Aberdeen
- 2008–2009: JEF United Chiba
- 2010: AIK
- 2012: Sibir Novosibirsk
- 2015: St Mirren (caretaker)
- * Club domestic league appearances and goals

Alex Miller (born 4 July 1949) is a Scottish football manager and former player. As a player, he had a 15-year career with Rangers, winning several trophies. As a manager, he won the 1991–92 Scottish League Cup with Hibernian. He subsequently worked for Premier League club Liverpool for nine years, assisting Gérard Houllier and Rafael Benítez.

== Playing career ==
Miller started his playing career with Clydebank Strollers before he made the move to Rangers. He played for Rangers from 1967 until 1982 and made 309 appearances during his spell at Ibrox, scoring 33 goals. After being coached by David White he was promoted to the first team, and won his first medal in the 1970 Scottish League Cup Final. He impressed the supporters having played in the 1971 Scottish Cup Final against Celtic despite having a broken jaw. However, under coach William Waddell, he was mostly a second choice player and was not in the squad in one of the biggest successes of the club's history, the triumph in the 1972 European Cup Winners' Cup Final.

It was only after Jock Wallace took over as coach that he became increasingly used, often as a substitute. As a regular from the mid-1970s, he won multiple titles, contributing to three Scottish Football League championships, three Scottish Cups (also losing in four further finals) and five Scottish League Cups.

== Coaching career ==
=== Early coaching career ===
Miller was appointed as player-manager when he played briefly for South China in Hong Kong in 1983, but was unable to save the club from relegation. He then had the same role at Morton in the first part of the 1983–84 season before contentiously joining the Greenock club's rivals, St Mirren, who were at that time in a higher division.

=== St Mirren ===
Miller managed St Mirren from 1983 until 1986. He guided the Paisley club to qualification for European competition. One of their all-time great nights came in a European campaign when in 1985, Slavia Prague were knocked out after a 3–0 Saints win at Love Street. Miller moulded a side that would win the 1987 Scottish Cup Final, but departed during that season.

=== Hibernian ===
Miller was then manager of Hibernian from 1986 to 1996, through a "difficult" period in the club's history, as the club came through financial problems. He led the team to victory in the 1991–92 Scottish League Cup, beating Rangers in the semi-final (1–0) and Dunfermline Athletic in the final (2–0). Hibs qualified for the UEFA Cup, losing on the away goals rule to RSC Anderlecht, then reached the 1993 Scottish League Cup Final, but this time lost out to Rangers (1–2). Hibs finished the 1994–95 season in third place in the league. Miller was sacked by Hibs in 1996, with some observers accusing him of having betrayed Hibs' "cavalier ideals".

=== Coventry and Aberdeen ===
Miller then moved to Coventry City, accepting an offer from his Scottish compatriot Gordon Strachan to become assistant manager. A year later, unable to resist the challenge of being his own man again, he moved to Aberdeen taking over the manager's post from Roy Aitken. However this stint was not a successful one and he was replaced in 1998 by Paul Hegarty.

=== Liverpool ===
Miller joined English Premier League side Liverpool as Director of Scouting under Gérard Houllier in 1999. However, when Rafael Benítez was appointed manager of Liverpool in 2004, he overhauled the scouting system. Miller then subsequently worked as first team coach, helping the club win the Champions League in 2005 and the FA Cup in 2006. Miller left Liverpool in May 2008 to manage Japanese side JEF United Chiba.

=== JEF United Chiba ===
Despite taking over the club when they had taken just two points from eleven games, Miller managed to guide the team to safety from relegation. However, following a string of poor results in the next season which the club was in the relegation zone, Miller's contract was terminated by the club in July 2009.

=== AIK ===
Miller was appointed manager of Swedish team AIK in June 2010 as the successor of Mikael Stahre and the interim solution Björn Wesström. AIK had been in some danger of relegation when Miller was appointed, but they eventually finished 11th in the 16-team division.

=== Sibir Novosibirsk ===
Miller was appointed head coach of Russian First Division club Sibir Novosibirsk in January 2012. Miller became the first British head coach in Russian football. Miller left the club after just nine matches in charge.

=== Return to St Mirren ===
Miller returned to St Mirren on 3 November 2015, as assistant manager to Ian Murray. He became caretaker manager after Murray resigned in December.

== Managerial statistics ==
Team	From	To	Record				
Team	From	To	G	W	D	L	Win %
South China	1983	1983					
Morton	1 August 1983	5 October 1983	13	5	2	6	38.46
St Mirren	8 October 1983	16 December 1986	153	57	33	63	37.25
Hibernian	15 November 1986	30 September 1996	452	154	160	138	34.07
Aberdeen	21 November 1997	8 December 1998	43	11	13	19	25.58
JEF United Chiba	2008	2009	40	12	13	15	30.00
AIK	22 June 2010	10 November 2010	24	9	4	11	37.50
Sibir Novosibirsk	10 January 2012	20 April 2012	9	1	5	3	11.11
Total			734	249	230	255	33.92

== Personal life ==
Two of Miller's sons, Graeme and Greg, both played for Hibs while Miller was manager there. Miller also employed Greg as a coach while he was manager of JEF United Chiba.

== Honours ==
=== Manager ===
St Mirren

- Renfrewshire Cup: 1983–84, 1984–85, 1985–86

Hibernian

- Scottish League Cup: 1991–92
- Tennents' Sixes: 1990
- East of Scotland Shield: 1989–90

Aberdeen

- Aberdeenshire Cup: 1997–98
