= Keith Wright (footballer) =

Scottish footballer and coach

Personal information
- Date of birth: 17 May 1965 (age 61)
- Place of birth: Edinburgh, Scotland
- Position: Striker

Senior career*
Years	Team	Apps	(Gls)
1983–1986	Raith Rovers	131	(61)
1986–1991	Dundee	167	(62)
1991–1997	Hibernian	197	(59)
1997–1998	Raith Rovers	36	(12)
1998–2000	Greenock Morton	38	(10)
2000	Stenhousemuir	5	(1)
2002–2003	Cowdenbeath	63	(17)
Total		637	(222)

International career
1990	Scottish League XI	1	(0)
1992	Scotland	1	(0)

Managerial career
- 2002–2004: Cowdenbeath
- * Club domestic league appearances and goals

Keith Wright (born 17 May 1965) is a Scottish football player and coach. Wright played as a striker for Raith Rovers, Dundee, Hibernian, Greenock Morton, Stenhousemuir and was then a player-manager at Cowdenbeath. He played once for Scotland, in 1992. He has since worked as a football coach for junior clubs and the Scottish Football Association.

== Career ==
Wright began his career in 1983 with Raith Rovers and achieved nearly a goal every two games during his time at Stark's Park. In December 1986, Wright moved north to Dundee, where he won the Challenge Cup in 1991 before departing for Hibernian. Within a year, Wright won silverware again, scoring in the 2–0 League Cup win over Dunfermline. Wright won one cap for Scotland in a 1992 friendly match against Northern Ireland.

After leaving Hibernian at the end of the 1996–97 season, Wright returned to Raith, spending around fifteen months in his second spell in Kirkcaldy. In November 1998, Wright moved to Greenock Morton and spent a similar length of time before a short spell with Stenhousemuir at the end of the 1999–2000 season. Wright then moved to Cowdenbeath for the start of the 2000–01 season and spent three years as a player in his final playing spell.

Wright was appointed player-anager of Cowdenbeath in March 2002 but was on a five-man shortlist for the Raith Rovers manager job just two months later. After the job went to Antonio Calderón, Wright carried on and picked up the Second Division Manager of the Month award for January 2003. Wright was sacked in October 2004, despite winning his last match and moving the club up to seventh in the league.

After leaving Cowdenbeath, Wright briefly worked for Livingston as a youth coach. He then worked as an SFA development officer for Midlothian Council for many years. Wright also coached at junior clubs Haddington Athletic and Penicuik Athletic. In January 2018 Wright was appointed as an SFA performance school coach, based at Broughton High School in Edinburgh.

== Honours ==
=== As a player ===
Dundee

- Scottish Challenge Cup: 1990–91

Hibernian

- League Cup: 1991–92

=== As an individual ===
- Dundee Hall of Fame
- Hibernian Hall of Fame
- Raith Rovers Hall of Fame

== See also ==
- List of footballers in Scotland by number of league appearances (500+)
- List of footballers in Scotland by number of league goals (200+)
