= Rab Walls =

Scottish footballer (1908–1992)

Rob Walls
Personal information
- Full name: Robert McKenzie Walls
- Date of birth: 13 July 1908
- Place of birth: Leith, Scotland
- Date of death: 1992 (aged 83–84)
- Height: 5 ft 10 in (1.78 m)
- Position: Forward

Senior career*
Years	Team	Apps	(Gls)
- Leith Emmett
–1928	Wemyss Athletic		
1928–1930	Heart of Midlothian	7	(3)
1930–1932	St Bernard's	62	(29)
1932–1936	Hibernian	120	(43)
1936–1937	Aldershot	20	(9)
- Waterford
1937–1945	Cowdenbeath	64	(91)
1940	→ Hibernian (guest)	5	(2)
1941	→ Aberdeen (guest)	4	(4)
- * Club domestic league appearances and goals

Robert McKenzie Walls (13 July 1908 – 1992) was a Scottish professional footballer who played as a forward in the Scottish League for Hibernian, Cowdenbeath, St Bernard's and Heart of Midlothian. He also played in the Football League for Aldershot.

== Personal life ==
After the Second World War, Walls emigrated to Canada.

== Career statistics ==
Appearances and goals by club, season and competition
Club	Season	League			Scottish Cup		Total	
Club	Season	Division	Apps	Goals	Apps	Goals	Apps	Goals
Heart of Midlothian	1928–29	Scottish Division One	6	3	0	0	6	3
Heart of Midlothian	1929–30	Scottish Division One	1	0	0	0	1	0
Heart of Midlothian	Total		7	3	0	0	7	3
St Bernard's	1930–31	Scottish Division Two	36	23	4	0	40	23
St Bernard's	1931–32	Scottish Division Two	26	6	0	0	26	6
St Bernard's	Total		62	29	4	0	66	29
Hibernian	1932–33	Scottish Division Two	27	16	5	2	32	18
Hibernian	1933–34	Scottish Division One	38	11	3	2	41	13
Hibernian	1934–35	Scottish Division One	31	11	5	3	36	14
Hibernian	1935–36	Scottish Division One	24	5	1	1	25	6
Hibernian	Total		120	43	14	8	134	51
Aldershot	1936–37	Third Division South	20	9	0	0	20	9
Cowdenbeath	1937-38	Scottish Division One	31	37	2	2	33	39
Cowdenbeath	1938–39	Scottish Division One	33	54	3	2	36	56
Cowdenbeath	Total		64	91	5	4	69	95
Career total			253	166	23	12	265	178

== Honours ==
Hibernian

- Scottish League Division Two: 1932–33

Cowdenbeath

- Scottish League Division Two: 1938–39

Individual

- Cowdenbeath Hall of Fame
