= Sweet (surname) =

Sweet is an Anglo-Saxon surname. Notable people with the surname include:

- Alanson Sweet (1804–1891), American businessman and politician
- Alec Stone Sweet, American legal scholar, musician and pétanque player
- Apollo Sweet (born 1957), Samoan/Australian boxer
- Blanche Sweet (1896–1986), American silent film actress
- Brad Sweet (born 1985), American race car driver
- Burton E. Sweet (1867–1957), American politician from Iowa
- Darrell Sweet (musician) (1947–1999), co-founder and drummer of the rock band Nazareth
- Darrell K. Sweet (1934–2011), American illustrator
- David Sweet (disambiguation)
- Denise Sweet, American poet and academic
- Devin Sweet (born 1996), American baseball player
- Dolph Sweet (1920–1985), American actor
- Don Sweet (born 1948), Canadian football player
- Elnathan Sweet (1837–1903), New York State Engineer and Surveyor
- Edwin F. Sweet (1847–1935), American politician from Michigan
- Gary Sweet (born 1957), Australian film and television actor
- George Sweet (1844–1920), English-born Australian geologist
- George Sweet (football manager) (1897–1969), Scottish football manager
- Dita Von Teese (born Heather Renée Sweet in 1972), American burlesque performer
- Henry Sweet (1845–1912), English philologist, phonetician and grammarian
- Herbert J. Sweet (1919–1998), United States Marine Corps official
- John Sweet (disambiguation)
- Jonathan Sweet, Australian actor
- Laurie Sweet, American politician
- Leonard Sweet (born 1961), American author, preacher, and clergyman
- Lynn Sweet (born 1961), American journalist and columnist
- Lynn Sweet (American football) (1881–1918), American football player
- Matthew Sweet (born 1964), American alternative rock musician
- Melissa Sweet, Australian human health and medicine journalist
- Melissa Sweet (born 1956), American children's illustrator
- Michael Sweet (disambiguation)
- Ossian Sweet (1895–1960), African-American physician charged with, but not convicted of, murder for defending himself against a White American mob
- Rachel Sweet (born 1962), American singer, writer, composer and actress
- Robert Sweet (disambiguation)
- Roger Sweet (1935–2026), American toy designer
- Roland Andrew Sweet (1940–2019), American mathematician and computer scientist
- Samuel Sweet (1825–1886), English-Australian settler and photographer
- Sylvanus H. Sweet (1830–1899), New York State Engineer and Surveyor 1874–1875
- Thaddeus C. Sweet (1872–1928), American politician from New York
- Walter C. Sweet (1927–2015), American paleontologist
- William Sweet (disambiguation)
- Willis Sweet (1856–1925), American politician from Idaho
