= 1928–29 Heart of Midlothian F.C. season =

Heart of Midlothian
1928–29 season
- Manager: Willie McCartney
- Stadium: Tynecastle Park
- Scottish First Division: 4th
- Scottish Cup: 1st Round

During the 1928–29 season Hearts competed in the Scottish First Division, the Scottish Cup and the East of Scotland Shield.

== Fixtures ==
=== Scottish Cup ===
19 January 1929 Scottish Cup R1	Hearts	0–2	Airdrieonians	Tynecastle Park
				Attendance: 25,000

=== Scottish First Division ===
11 August 1928 Scottish First Division	Queen's Park	1–3	Hearts	Hampden Park
				Attendance: 10,000

18 August 1928 Scottish First Division	Hearts	5–0	Hamilton Academical	Tynecastle Park
				Attendance: 24,000

25 August 1928 Scottish First Division	Clyde	1–1	Hearts	Shawfield Stadium
				Attendance: 5,000

1 September 1928 Scottish First Division	Hearts	7–3	Ayr United	Tynecastle Park
				Attendance: 23,500

8 September 1928 Scottish First Division	Raith Rovers	0–5	Hearts	Stark's Park
				Attendance: 5,000

15 September 1928 Scottish First Division	Hearts	0–1	Rangers	Tynecastle Park
				Attendance: 48,000

22 September 1928 Scottish First Division	Airdrieonians	1–1	Hearts	Broomfield Park
				Attendance: 4,000

29 September 1928 Scottish First Division	Dundee	5–3	Hearts	Dens Park
				Attendance: 12,000

6 October 1928 Scottish First Division	Hearts	6–2	Falkirk	Tynecastle Park
				Attendance: 22,500

13 October 1928 Scottish First Division	Hearts	4–1	Falkirk	Tynecastle Park
				Attendance: 19,500

20 October 1928 Scottish First Division	Hearts	1–1	Hibernian	Tynecastle Park
				Attendance: 28,000

27 October 1928 Scottish First Division	Aberdeen	1–3	Hearts	Pittodrie Park
				Attendance: 16,000

3 November 1928 Scottish First Division	St Johnstone	0–3	Hearts	Muirton Park
				Attendance: 9,000

10 November 1928 Scottish First Division	Hearts	5–1	Motherwell	Tynecastle Park
				Attendance: 25,000

17 November 1928 Scottish First Division	St Mirren	2–2	Hearts	St Mirren Park, Love Street
				Attendance: 8,000

24 November 1928 Scottish First Division	Kilmarnock	3–2	Hearts	Rugby Park
				Attendance: 10,000

1 December 1928 Scottish First Division	Hearts	4–1	Third Lanark	Tynecastle Park
				Attendance: 18,000

8 December 1928 Scottish First Division	Hearts	2–1	Partick Thistle	Tynecastle Park
				Attendance: 15,500

15 December 1928 Scottish First Division	Celtic	1–0	Hearts	Celtic Park
				Attendance: 14,000

22 December 1928 Scottish First Division	Hamilton Academical	3–2	Hearts	Douglas Park
				Attendance: 3,000

25 December 1928 Scottish First Division	Hearts	1–0	St Mirren	Tynecastle Park
				Attendance: 14,000

29 December 1928 Scottish First Division	Hearts	4–1	Queen's Park	Tynecastle Park
				Attendance: 13,000

1 January 1929 Scottish First Division	Hibernian	1–0	Hearts	Easter Road
				Attendance: 25,000

2 January 1929 Scottish First Division	Hearts	3–2	Aberdeen	Tynecastle Park
				Attendance: 16,500

5 January 1929 Scottish First Division	Hearts	4–0	Clyde	Tynecastle Park
				Attendance: 12,500

12 January 1929 Scottish First Division	Ayr United	2–4	Hearts	Somerset Park
				Attendance: 7,000

26 January 1929 Scottish First Division	Hearts	2–1	Celtic	Tynecastle Park
				Attendance: 23,500

9 February 1929 Scottish First Division	Hearts	3–0	Airdrieonians	Tynecastle Park
				Attendance: 15,000

23 February 1929 Scottish First Division	Falkirk	3–3	Hearts	Brockville Park
				Attendance: 15,000

2 March 1929 Scottish First Division	Cowdenbeath	1–2	Hearts	Central Park
				Attendance: 3,000

6 March 1929 Scottish First Division	Hearts	1–1	Dundee	Tynecastle Park
				Attendance: 6,000

9 March 1929 Scottish First Division	Hearts	0–3	St Johnstone	Tynecastle Park
				Attendance: 14,500

12 March 1929 Scottish First Division	Rangers	2–0	Hearts	Ibrox Park
				Attendance: 12,000

16 March 1929 Scottish First Division	Motherwell	3–2	Hearts	Fir Park
				Attendance: 6,000

30 March 1929 Scottish First Division	Hearts	3–3	Kilmarnock	Tynecastle Park
				Attendance: 13,500

1 April 1929 Scottish First Division	Third Lanark	2–2	Hearts	Cathkin Park
				Attendance: 3,000

20 April 1929 Scottish First Division	Partick Thistle	2–0	Hearts	Firhill Park
				Attendance: 3,000

27 April 1929 Scottish First Division	Hearts	1–1	Raith Rovers	Tynecastle Park
				Attendance: 6,000

== See also ==
- List of Heart of Midlothian F.C. seasons
