= 1929–30 Heart of Midlothian F.C. season =

Heart of Midlothian
1929–30 season
- Manager: Willie McCartney
- Stadium: Tynecastle Park
- Scottish First Division: 10th
- Scottish Cup: Semi-final

During the 1929–30 season Hearts competed in the Scottish First Division, the Scottish Cup and the East of Scotland Shield.

== Fixtures ==
=== Scottish Cup ===
| 18 January 1930 Scottish Cup R1 | Hearts | 1–0 | Clydebank | Tynecastle Park |
| | | | | Attendance: 15,000 |

| 1 February 1930 Scottish Cup R2 | Hearts | 0–0 | St Bernard's | Tynecastle Park |
| | | | | Attendance: 27,000 |

| 5 February 1930 Scottish Cup R2 Replay | Hearts | 5–1 | St Bernard's | Tynecastle Park |
| | | | | Attendance: 22,000 |

| 15 February 1930 Scottish Cup R3 | Hibernian | 1–3 | Hearts | Tynecastle Park |
| | | | | Attendance: 28,000 |

| 1 March 1930 Scottish Cup R4 | Dundee | 2–2 | Hearts | Tynecastle Park |
| | | | | Attendance: 31,000 |

| 5 March 1930 Scottish Cup R4 Replay | Hearts | 4–0 | Dundee | Tynecastle Park |
| | | | | Attendance: 32,000 |

| 22 March 1930 Scottish Cup SF | Rangers | 4–1 | Hearts | Tynecastle Park |
| | | | | Attendance: 92,084 |

=== Scottish First Division ===
| 10 August 1929 Scottish First Division | Celtic | 2–1 | Hearts | Celtic Park |
| | | | | Attendance: 35,000 |

| 17 August 1929 Scottish First Division | Hearts | 1–1 | Kilmarnock | Tynecastle Park |
| | | | | Attendance: 21,500 |

| 24 August 1929 Scottish First Division | Cowdenbeath | 0–1 | Hearts | Central Park |
| | | | | Attendance: 6,500 |

| 31 August 1929 Scottish First Division | Hearts | 5–0 | St Mirren | Tynecastle Park |
| | | | | Attendance: 24,500 |

| 7 September 1929 Scottish First Division | Motherwell | 0–2 | Hearts | Fir Park |
| | | | | Attendance: 8,000 |

| 14 September 1929 Scottish First Division | Hearts | 3–1 | Dundee United | Tynecastle Park |
| | | | | Attendance: 19,500 |

| 21 September 1929 Scottish First Division | Partick Thistle | 2–1 | Hearts | Firhill Park |
| | | | | Attendance: 25,000 |

| 28 September 1929 Scottish First Division | Hearts | 2–2 | St Johnstone | Tynecastle Park |
| | | | | Attendance: 19,000 |

| 5 October 1929 Scottish First Division | Hearts | 2–0 | Rangers | Tynecastle Park |
| | | | | Attendance: 41,000 |

| 12 October 1929 Scottish First Division | Falkirk | 2–3 | Hearts | Tynecastle Park |
| | | | | Attendance: 12,500 |

| 19 October 1929 Scottish First Division | Hearts | 2–2 | Aberdeen | Tynecastle Park |
| | | | | Attendance: 37,500 |

| 26 October 1929 Scottish First Division | Hibernian | 1–1 | Hearts | Easter Road |
| | | | | Attendance: 27,000 |

| 2 November 1929 Scottish First Division | Hearts | 6–4 | Hamilton Academical | Tynecastle Park |
| | | | | Attendance: 13,000 |

| 9 November 1929 Scottish First Division | Ayr United | 3–1 | Hearts | Somerset Park |
| | | | | Attendance: 10,000 |

| 16 November 1929 Scottish First Division | Hearts | 4–0 | Morton | Tynecastle Park |
| | | | | Attendance: 11,500 |

| 23 November 1929 Scottish First Division | Queen's Park | 6–2 | Hearts | Hampden Park |
| | | | | Attendance: 12,000 |

| 30 November 1929 Scottish First Division | Clyde | 3–3 | Hearts | Shawfield Stadium |
| | | | | Attendance: 8,000 |

| 7 December 1929 Scottish First Division | Hearts | 1–0 | Airdrieonians | Tynecastle Park |
| | | | | Attendance: 10,000 |

| 14 December 1929 Scottish First Division | Dundee | 3–0 | Hearts | Dens Park |
| | | | | Attendance: 8,000 |

| 21 December 1929 Scottish First Division | Hearts | 1–3 | Celtic | Tynecastle Park |
| | | | | Attendance: 22,000 |

| 28 December 1929 Scottish First Division | Kilmarnock | 2–1 | Hearts | Rugby Park |
| | | | | Attendance: 4,000 |

| 1 January 1930 Scottish First Division | Hearts | 1–1 | Hibernian | Tynecastle Park |
| | | | | Attendance: 15,000 |

| 2 January 1930 Scottish First Division | Aberdeen | 2–2 | Hearts | Pittodrie Park |
| | | | | Attendance: 18,000 |

| 4 January 1930 Scottish First Division | Hearts | 2–2 | Cowdenbeath | Tynecastle Park |
| | | | | Attendance: 15,500 |

| 11 January 1930 Scottish First Division | St Mirren | 6–2 | Hearts | St Mirren Park, Love Street |
| | | | | Attendance: 6,000 |

| 25 January 1930 Scottish First Division | Hearts | 3–2 | Morton | Tynecastle Park |
| | | | | Attendance: 19,500 |

| 8 February 1930 Scottish First Division | Hearts | 0–0 | Partick Thistle | Tynecastle Park |
| | | | | Attendance: 15,500 |

| 19 February 1930 Scottish First Division | St Johnstone | 0–3 | Hearts | Muirton Park |
| | | | | Attendance: 4,000 |

| 22 February 1930 Scottish First Division | Rangers | 2–1 | Hearts | Ibrox Park |
| | | | | Attendance: 30,000 |

| 8 March 1930 Scottish First Division | Hamilton Academical | 2–1 | Hearts | Douglas Park |
| | | | | Attendance: 8,000 |

| 12 March 1930 Scottish First Division | Hearts | 0–2 | Falkirk | Tynecastle Park |
| | | | | Attendance: 4,000 |

| 15 March 1930 Scottish First Division | Hearts | 1–2 | Ayr United | Tynecastle Park |
| | | | | Attendance: 12,000 |

| 26 March 1930 Scottish First Division | Morton | 3–2 | Hearts | Cappielow Park |
| | | | | Attendance: 5,000 |

| 29 March 1930 Scottish First Division | Hearts | 0–3 | Queen's Park | Tynecastle Park |
| | | | | Attendance: 6,000 |

| 2 April 1930 Scottish First Division | Dundee United | 2–3 | Hearts | Tannadice Park |
| | | | | Attendance: 4,000 |

| 5 April 1930 Scottish First Division | Hearts | 0–1 | Clyde | Tynecastle Park |
| | | | | Attendance: 5,500 |

| 12 April 1930 Scottish First Division | Airdrieonians | 3–2 | Hearts | Broomfield Park |
| | | | | Attendance: 2,000 |

| 19 April 1930 Scottish First Division | Hearts | 1–0 | Dundee | Tynecastle Park |
| | | | | Attendance: 5,500 |

== See also ==
- List of Heart of Midlothian F.C. seasons
