= Billy Mercer =

Billy Mercer may refer to:

- Billy Mercer (footballer, born 1888) (1888–1956), former Hull City, Huddersfield Town and Blackpool goalkeeper
- Billy Mercer (footballer, born 1896) (1896–1975), former Preston North End, Blackpool, Lancaster Town and Boston Town player
- Billy Mercer (footballer, born 1969), former Rotherham United and Chesterfield player, now goalkeeping coach at Burnley FC
- Billy Mercer (musician), bassist for Strays Don't Sleep

== See also ==
- William Mercer (disambiguation)
- Bill Mercer (1926–2025), American sportscaster
