= Beath High School =

Non-denomational state secondary school in Cowdenbeath, Fife

Location
- Foulford Road; Cowdenbeath, Fife, KY4 9BH; Scotland; 56.1135°N 3.357°W

Information
- Type: Comprehensive
- Motto: Surgo in Lucem (Rise to the light)
- Established: 1910
- Local authority: Fife Council
- Headteacher: Stephen Ross
- Gender: Mixed
- Age: 11 to 18
- Enrolment: 1200
- Houses: Ness, Katrine, Lomond, Rannoch,
- Colour
- Publication: Beath High School Newsletter
- Website: http://www.fifedirect.org.uk/atoz/index.cfm?fuseaction=facility.display&facid=9786f936-aca0-4460-bf2970239fe78ec9

Beath High School is a non-denomational state secondary school in Cowdenbeath, Fife. The school is run by Fife Council and the current roll stands at around 1400 pupils aged from 11 to 18. It serves Cowdenbeath and Kelty and the villages of Crossgates, Hill of Beath and Lumphinnans. Some pupils from Lochgelly and Ballingry attend the school. The current rector is Stephen Ross.

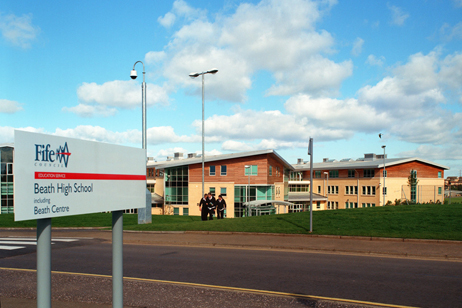

== History ==
Beath High School was built in 1890 as Beath Higher Grade School, catering for the children of local people who wished to proceed to higher education. This building was located on Stenhouse Street, close to the town centre. In 1964 a 'modern' school was opened on Foulford Road on the edge of the town.

From 1964 until 1981 the two buildings operated as separate schools with the new building housing Beath Senior High School and catering for pupils perceived as more academic while the older building, then known as Beath Junior High School, provided a more vocational education up to O-grade standard. Pupils from Beath Junior High, Ballingry Junior High and Auchterderran High had an opportunity to move to Beath Senior High at the end of their 2nd year or for 5th and 6th year if they wished to take 'Higher Grade' qualifications. In 1981 the two schools were combined as Beath High School with the older building acting as an annexe for S1 and S2 pupils. The opening of the new Lochgelly High School in 1987 resulted in a significant change in the school catchment area and a reduction in the school roll. This reduction in headcount together with the poor state of repair of the Old Beath building resulted in the closure and, in the 1990s, the partial demolition of the Stenhouse Street building. Part of the Old Beath building, the Art Department, can still be seen on Stenhouse Street at the junction with Rowan Terrace.

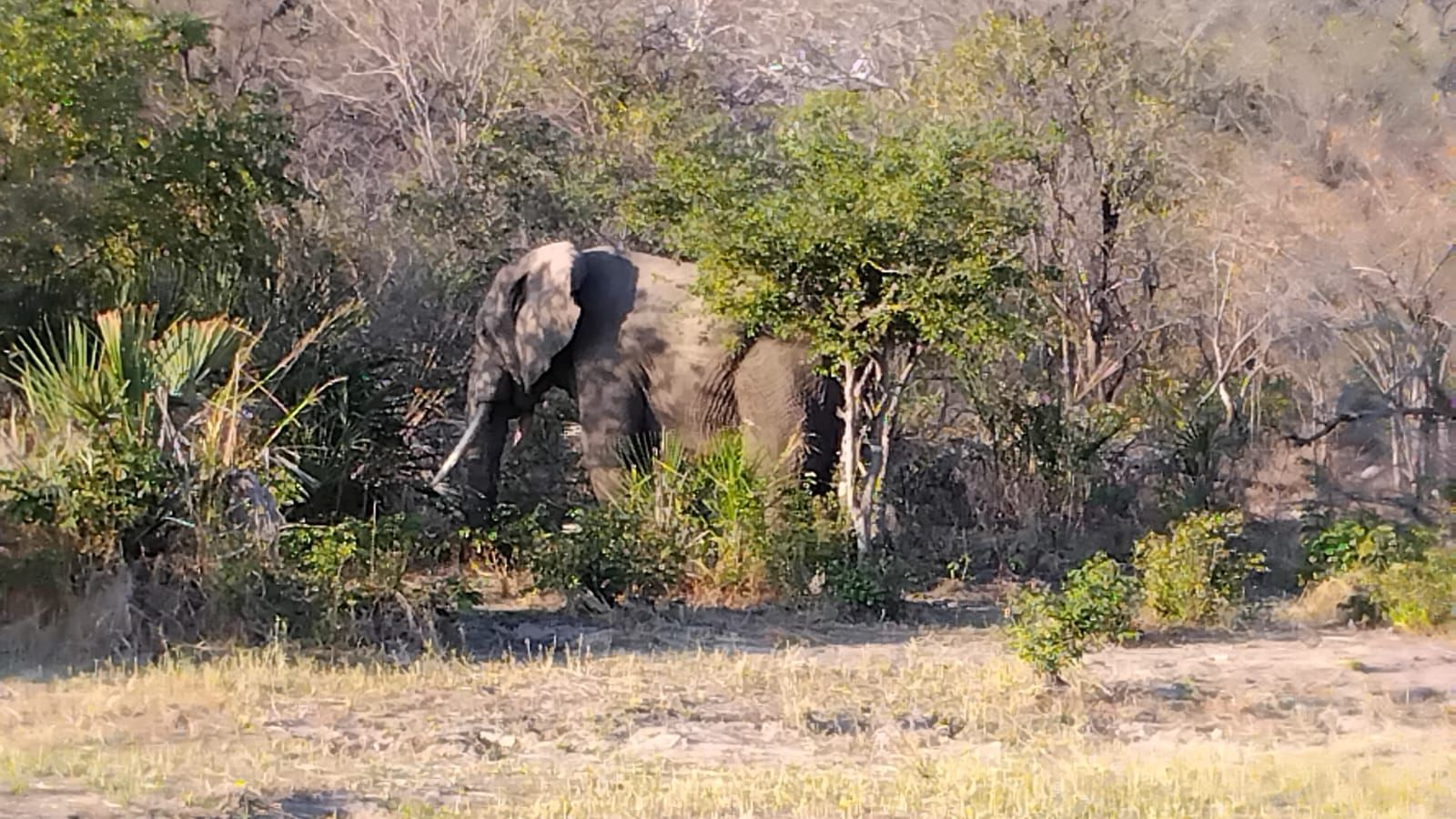
School donated photo taken in Liwonde National Park in July 2025

By the 1990s, the Foulford Road building was also in a poor state of repair and struggling to provide suitable teaching accommodation with many classes being taught in outdoor huts that were supposed to be temporary but were there for twenty years. In 2003 a new school building was completed to the east of the previous Foulford Road site allowing everything apart from the games hall built in the early 1980s to be demolished and a new all-weather sports pitch to be built on the former school site.

In 2002, the school was awarded with the National Curriculum award.

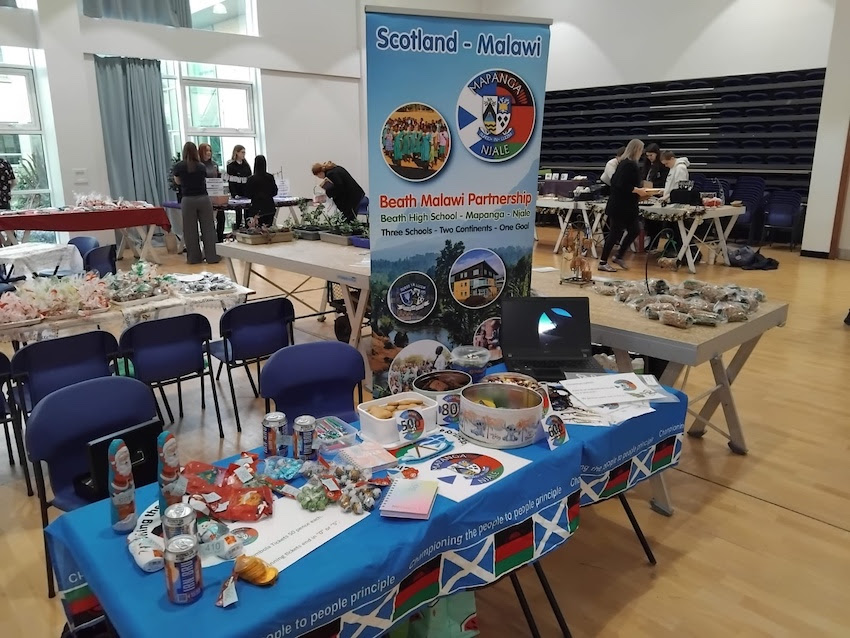
Partnering with schools in Mapanga and Njale

In 2025 the school had a trip to Malawi. There is a three way partnership between the Beath School and schools in Mapanga and Njale.

== Notable former pupils ==
- Stuart Adamson; musician with the Skids (band) and Big Country
- Eric Archibald: footballer with Cowdenbeath F.C.
- Sir James Whyte Black; winner of the Nobel Prize in Physiology or Medicine in 1988 for his work leading to the discovery of propranolol and cimetidine
- Scott Brown; Hibernian F.C., Celtic F.C. and Scotland midfielder
- Archie Campbell; Rangers F.C., Cowdenbeath F.C., Morton F.C., Dumbarton F.C. and Clyde F.C. forward
- Jennie Erdal, writer
- Harry Ewing, Baron Ewing of Kirkford; politician
- Elspeth King; Museum director
- Jennie Lee, Baroness Lee of Asheridge; politician
- Jim Leishman; footballer with Dunfermline F.C., Cowdenbeath F.C. and football manager
- Dean MacDonald; racing driver
- William McLaren; artist and illustrator
- Iain Paxton; Scotland national rugby union team and British & Irish Lions rugby international
- Andrew Polhill; Mr Universe 2012
- Ian Rankin; Scottish crime writer

== Current building ==
The current building stands on three floors, separated into three blocks, joined together at the back of the school.

== Houses ==
Beath High School has four houses, each named after the lochs In Scotland. Each house has House Captains, made up from pupils across S1-S6.

- Katrine
- Lomond
- Ness
- Rannoch

Previous House Names were

- Baird
- Ramsay
- Napier
- Oakfield
- Cantsdam
- Fordel
- Mosside

Beath (senior) high school used to have 4 houses named:

- Glencraig
- Kirkford
- Lindsay
- Aitken
