= 1933–34 Hibernian F.C. season =

Hibernian
1933–34 season
- Manager: Bobby Templeton
- Scottish First Division: 16th
- Scottish Cup: R3
- Average home league attendance: 10,421 (up 4,185)

During the 1933–34 season Hibernian, a football club based in Edinburgh, came sixteenth out of 20 clubs in the Scottish First Division.

== Scottish First Division ==
Match Day	Date	Opponent	H/A	Score	Hibernian Scorer(s)	Attendance
1	12 August	Queen's Park	A	1–2		7,000
2	19 August	Rangers	H	0–0		5,000
3	23 August	Cowdenbeath	A	4–2		4,000
4	25 August	Hamilton Academical	A	1–4		4,000
5	2 September	Kilmarnock	H	4–1		15,000
6	9 September	Heart of Midlothian	A	0–0		32,853
7	13 September	Motherwell	H	0–2		20,000
8	16 September	Clyde	H	3–0		14,000
9	23 September	Aberdeen	A	1–2		10,000
10	30 September	St Johnstone	H	2–6		13,000
11	7 October	Queen of the South	A	0–1		6,000
12	14 October	Falkirk	H	1–3		11,000
13	21 October	St Mirren	H	2–1		8,000
14	28 October	Celtic	A	1–2		15,000
15	4 November	Cowdenbeath	H	6–1		7,000
16	11 November	Motherwell	A	1–2		7,000
17	18 November	Partick Thistle	A	2–3		5,000
18	25 November	Airdrieonians	A	3–0		2,000
19	2 December	Ayr United	H	0–0		9,000
20	9 December	Third Lanark	A	0–1		5,000
21	16 December	Dundee	H	2–1		7,000
22	23 December	Queen's Park	H	2–1		7,000
23	30 December	Rangers	A	0–6		6,000
24	1 January	Heart of Midlothian	H	1–4		30,000
25	2 January	St Johnstone	A	1–0		5,000
26	6 January	Hamilton Academical	H	1–2		6,000
27	13 January	Kilmarnock	A	0–2		4,122
28	27 January	Aberdeen	H	3–2		12,000
29	24 February	Queen of the South	H	0–2		7,000
30	3 March	Falkirk	A	1–3		4,000
31	10 March	St Mirren	A	3–0		4,000
32	17 March	Celtic	H	1–2		12,000
33	24 March	Partick Thistle	H	0–2		6,000
34	31 March	Airdireonians	H	0–2		3,000
35	7 April	Ayr United	A	1–4		4,000
36	14 April	Clyde	A	0–1		3,000
37	21 April	Third Lanark	H	3–1		6,000
38	28 April	Dundee	A	0–1		350

=== Final League table ===
P	Team	Pld	W	D	L	GF	GA	GD	Pts
15	Queen's Park	38	13	5	20	65	85	–20	31
16	Hibernian	38	12	3	23	51	69	–18	27
17	St Mirren	38	9	9	20	46	75	–29	27

=== Scottish Cup ===
Round	Date	Opponent	H/A	Score	Hibernian Scorer(s)	Attendance
R1	20 January	Clyde	H	5–4		16,426
R2	3 February	Alloa Athletic	H	6–0		12,181
R3	17 February	Aberdeen	H	0–1		25,600

== See also ==
- List of Hibernian F.C. seasons
