= William Mercer =

William Mercer may refer to:

== Sports ==
- Billy Mercer (rugby league) (1905–1965), rugby league footballer of the 1930s for England and St Helens RLFC
- William Mercer (cricketer) (1922–1989), English cricketer
- Willie Mercer (1874–1932), Scottish footballer

== Others ==
- William Mercer (poet) (c. 1605–c. 1675), Scottish poet and army officer
- William Thomas Mercer (1821–1879), British Colonial Secretary in Hong Kong, 1859–1868
- William W. Mercer (born 1964), American politician from Montana and former United States Attorney
- William (Rosko) Mercer (1927–2000), known as Rosko, American news announcer and disc jockey
- Bill Mercer (1926–2025), American sportscaster
- William Mercer (Australian politician) (1796–1871), British Army officer, landowner, pastoralist, and politician in colonial New South Wales

== See also ==
- Billy Mercer (disambiguation)
