= 1934–35 Hibernian F.C. season =

Hibernian
1934–35 season
- Manager: Bobby Templeton
- Scottish First Division: 11th
- Scottish Cup: R3
- Average home league attendance: 10,370 (down 51)

During the 1934–35 season Hibernian, a football club based in Edinburgh, came eleventh out of 20 clubs in the Scottish First Division.

== Scottish First Division ==
Match Day	Date	Opponent	H/A	Score	Hibernian Scorer(s)	Attendance
1	11 August	Hamilton Academical	H	3–1		10,000
2	18 August	Kilmarnock	A	1–0		5,000
3	22 August	St Mirren	H	0–0		10,000
4	25 August	Aberdeen	H	2–3		14,000
5	1 September	St Johnstone	A	0–2		6,000
6	8 September	Heart of Midlothian	H	1–0		24,038
7	11 September	Celtic	A	0–4		15,000
8	15 September	Clyde	A	2–3		10,000
9	22 September	Queen of the South	H	1–1		5,000
10	29 September	Rangers	A	2–4		5,000
11	6 October	Queen's Park	H	5–1		6,000
12	13 October	Albion Rovers	A	0–2		6,000
13	20 October	Dunfermline Athletic	A	1–2		4,000
14	27 October	Motherwell	H	1–1		12,000
15	3 November	Partick Thistle	H	2–0		7,000
16	10 November	Airdrieonians	H	2–2		6,000
17	17 November	Ayr United	A	1–1		6,000
18	24 November	Falkirk	H	2–0		5,000
19	1 December	Dundee	A	2–0		5,000
20	8 December	St Mirren	A	2–1		6,000
21	15 December	Celtic	H	3–2		24,000
22	22 December	Hamilton Academical	A	1–2		3,000
23	29 December	Kilmarnock	H	1–0		9,000
24	1 January	Heart of Midlothian	A	2–5		28,743
25	2 January	St Johnstone	H	1–1		10,000
26	5 January	Aberdeen	A	0–2		8,500
27	12 January	Clyde	H	4–0		8,000
28	19 January	Queen of the South	A	2–0		1,000
29	2 February	Rangers	H	1–2		23,000
30	2 March	Albion Rovers	H	3–3		6,000
31	9 March	Dunfermline Athletic	H	3–1		5,000
32	16 March	Motherwell	A	1–4		5,000
33	23 March	Partick Thistle	A	1–3		8,000
34	29 March	Airdireonians	A	0–7		3,000
35	13 April	Ayr United	H	1–1		5,000
36	15 April	Queen's Park	A	1–3		3,189
37	20 April	Falkirk	A	2–5		3,000
38	27 April	Dundee	H	2–1		8,000

=== Final League table ===
P	Team	Pld	W	D	L	GF	GA	GD	Pts
10	Clyde	38	14	10	14	71	69	2	38
11	Hibernian	38	14	8	16	59	70	–11	36
12	Queen's Park	38	13	10	15	61	80	–19	36

=== Scottish Cup ===
Round	Date	Opponent	H/A	Score	Hibernian Scorer(s)	Attendance
R1	23 January	Vale of Atholl	H	5–0		3,819
R2	9 February	Inverness Clachnacuddin	H	7–0		3,818
R3	23 February	Aberdeen	A	0–0		23,636
R3 R	27 February	Aberdeen	H	1–1		21,320
R3 2R	4 March	Aberdeen	H	2–3		22,943

== See also ==
- List of Hibernian F.C. seasons
