= John Dougary =

Scottish footballer and manager

John Dougary was a Scottish football player and manager.

Dougary, an outside-left, was the son of one of the founders of Cowdenbeath football club. He played for Lochgelly Amateurs and Moray House (where he trained to become a teacher) and for English side Stoke City during the First World War.

After the war, he worked as a teacher and began running schoolboy football matches. In 1934 he took over as manager of Cowdenbeath, but resigned in 1938 due to his teaching commitments. The following year Cowdenbeath won the Scottish Second Division title, with a team largely put together by Dougary.

Dougary worked as a part-time scout for Liverpool, discovering Billy Liddell for the Anfield side. In 1951 he quit teaching to become manager of Welsh side Rhyl. In his first two seasons with Rhyl, they won the Welsh Cup.

In 1955, he returned to Scotland to manage Cowdenbeath again, but in 1958 resigned as manager for health reasons and took a post of secretary-director of the club. He left this post acrimoniously in the summer of 1961.

Dougary died in 1970.
