= 1928–29 Scottish Division One =

30th season of top-tier football league in Scotland

Scottish Division One
- Season: 1928–29
- Champions: Rangers
- Relegated: Third Lanark; Raith Rovers

The 1928–29 Scottish Division One season of Association football was won by Rangers by sixteen points over nearest rival Celtic. Third Lanark and Raith Rovers finished 19th and 20th respectively and were relegated to the 1929–30 Scottish Division Two.

== League table ==
Pos	Team	Pld	W	D	L	GF	GA	GD	Pts
1	Rangers	38	30	7	1	107	32	+75	67
2	Celtic	38	22	7	9	67	44	+23	51
3	Motherwell	38	20	10	8	85	66	+19	50
4	Heart of Midlothian	38	19	9	10	91	57	+34	47
5	Queen's Park	38	18	7	13	100	69	+31	43
6	Partick Thistle	38	17	7	14	91	70	+21	41
7	Aberdeen	38	16	8	14	81	68	+13	40
8	St Mirren	38	16	8	14	78	75	+3	40
9	St Johnstone	38	14	10	14	57	70	−13	38
10	Kilmarnock	38	14	8	16	79	74	+5	36
11	Falkirk	38	14	8	16	68	86	−18	36
12	Hamilton Academical	38	13	9	16	58	83	−25	35
13	Cowdenbeath	38	14	5	19	55	69	−14	33
14	Hibernian	38	13	6	19	54	62	−8	32
15	Airdrieonians	38	12	7	19	56	65	−9	31
16	Ayr United	38	12	7	19	65	84	−19	31
17	Clyde	38	12	6	20	47	71	−24	30
18	Dundee	38	9	11	18	59	59	0	29
19	Third Lanark	38	10	6	22	71	102	−31	26
20	Raith Rovers	38	9	6	23	52	105	−53	24

== Results ==
Home \ Away	ABE	AIR	AYR	CEL	CLY	COW	DND	FAL	HAM	HOM	HIB	KIL	MOT	PAR	QPA	RAI	RAN	STJ	STM	THI
Aberdeen		2–1	2–1	2–2	3–1	4–2	4–0	5–3	4–1	1–3	0–1	2–1	1–1	5–0	3–0	3–1	2–2	2–0	6–0	4–0
Airdrieonians	5–0		3–0	0–1	2–2	3–2	1–1	2–3	1–0	1–1	0–2	2–1	0–1	1–0	2–2	3–1	2–5	5–1	3–0	2–1
Ayr United	3–3	2–0		0–2	3–1	3–1	0–3	2–0	1–1	2–4	4–1	2–4	2–0	1–3	4–2	0–1	1–3	1–2	2–2	3–0
Celtic	2–2	4–1	3–0		4–0	1–0	2–1	3–0	3–0	1–0	1–4	3–0	2–0	1–0	1–2	3–1	1–2	0–0	0–3	3–1
Clyde	2–1	3–1	1–0	0–1		2–3	2–1	2–1	2–3	1–1	0–1	1–1	1–1	0–4	2–2	2–0	2–3	2–1	4–0	3–2
Cowdenbeath	1–1	2–1	3–1	0–1	1–2		4–2	3–1	2–0	1–2	2–0	2–0	1–3	2–0	0–1	2–0	0–2	1–0	0–0	1–1
Dundee	1–1	2–2	2–3	0–1	1–2	4–0		1–2	0–1	5–3	1–0	1–3	3–0	0–0	0–0	0–3	2–3	0–2	2–3	2–2
Falkirk	2–0	2–1	5–2	3–0	2–1	2–2	1–3		4–2	3–3	2–1	2–2	0–7	0–0	1–0	4–1	1–4	2–0	2–2	3–1
Hamilton Academical	3–2	1–3	2–0	1–1	2–0	0–0	3–3	2–2		3–2	2–1	0–2	0–3	2–2	3–3	5–1	3–1	2–1	3–0	1–4
Heart of Midlothian	3–2	3–0	7–3	2–1	4–0	4–1	1–1	6–2	5–0		1–1	3–3	5–1	2–1	4–1	1–1	0–1	0–3	1–0	4–1
Hibernian	4–1	1–1	2–2	2–1	3–0	1–2	2–0	3–2	0–1	1–0		1–1	1–1	3–1	1–2	2–0	1–2	2–2	3–5	6–1
Kilmarnock	0–1	0–2	1–2	2–3	3–1	4–2	3–1	1–1	0–0	3–2	1–0		4–2	2–2	7–4	7–1	1–3	1–1	2–4	3–0
Motherwell	1–0	4–2	5–0	3–3	1–0	5–1	1–1	2–1	4–3	3–2	3–1	2–3		5–4	0–5	3–1	2–4	1–1	1–1	3–2
Partick Thistle	3–2	1–1	4–8	3–0	2–0	2–1	4–2	5–2	8–0	2–0	3–0	2–1	1–3		2–2	6–1	1–1	6–2	2–4	3–4
Queen's Park	6–2	2–0	3–0	4–4	2–1	6–1	2–4	1–3	5–0	1–3	6–1	2–0	2–3	3–2		5–0	0–4	6–0	5–0	8–3
Raith Rovers	2–2	3–2	4–2	1–4	3–0	0–2	0–3	2–0	3–1	0–2	1–0	5–3	2–2	2–4	1–1		1–3	3–3	1–5	0–0
Rangers	2–0	2–0	0–0	3–0	0–0	3–1	3–0	1–1	4–0	2–0	3–0	4–2	0–0	1–0	2–1	7–1		8–0	1–1	5–1
St Johnstone	2–1	1–0	0–0	1–1	5–0	3–1	2–2	3–1	2–2	0–3	4–0	1–0	2–3	1–3	1–0	3–1	1–3		1–0	2–1
St Mirren	5–2	2–0	2–3	0–1	1–0	1–4	2–2	5–0	1–3	2–2	1–0	5–4	2–3	3–0	1–2	5–2	1–5	2–2		5–0
Third Lanark	1–3	4–0	2–2	0–2	2–4	3–1	1–2	5–2	3–2	2–2	2–1	2–3	2–2	2–5	3–1	5–1	2–5	4–1	1–2	

Legend: Blue = home team win; Yellow = draw; Red = away team win.
