= John Dickson (footballer) =

Scottish footballer

Personal information
- Date of birth: 15 May 1949
- Place of birth: Kirkcaldy, Scotland
- Date of death: 1998 (aged 49)
- Place of death: Kirkcaldy, Scotland
- Position: Forward

Senior career*
Years	Team	Apps	(Gls)
- Lochore Welfare
1968–1972	Cowdenbeath	119	(61)
1972–1974	St Mirren	59	(22)
1974–1976	Ayr United	27	(4)
1976–1978	Elgin City		
1978–1980	East Fife	42	(9)
- Dundonald Bluebell
Total		247	(96)
- * Club domestic league appearances and goals

John Dickson (15 May 1949 – 1998) was a Scottish professional footballer who played as a forward.

== Career ==
Born in Kirkcaldy, Dickson played for Lochore Welfare, Cowdenbeath, St Mirren, Ayr United, Elgin City, East Fife and Dundonald Bluebell.
