= Robert Sweet =

Robert Sweet may refer to:

- Robert Sweet (botanist) (1783–1835), English botanist, horticulturist, and ornithologist
- Robert W. Sweet (1922–2019), U.S. federal judge
- Robert Sweet (musician) (born 1960), American drummer

== See also ==
- Sweet (surname)
