= Jennie Erdal =

Scottish writer (1951–2020)

Jennifer Elizabeth Wilkie Erdal, née Crawford; first married name Bradshaw, known as Jennie Erdal (2 February 1951 – 23 May 2020) was a Scottish writer. She was the author of Ghosting, a memoir of her childhood in a Fife mining village and of being the long-serving ghostwriter of Naim Attallah, the publisher and owner of Quartet Books.

Her Guardian obituary described her childhood:

She was born Jennifer Elizabeth Wilkie Crawford in Lochgelly, a small town famous for its eponymous tawse – the split leather strap used in Scottish schools and some homes, including the Crawfords’, to enforce discipline on children. Her father, Edward Crawford, was a bricklayer and market gardener; her mother, Elizabeth (nee Wilkie), was a housewife with a sideline selling corsets from home. Jennie, who had three brothers, was a passionate reader, studious and sporty. A popular child, she retained her great gift for friendship throughout her life. She attended Lochgelly West primary school and Beath high school, where she displayed a remarkable talent for languages, studying Latin, French, German, Russian and Spanish. She was head girl, captain of the hockey team, arts dux – highest ranking pupil – and represented Scotland twice in the UK schools’ debating tournament.

She went on to the University of St Andrews, where she took a double first in Russian and philosophy and was awarded the Miller prize for the most distinguished final-year student. She married in her early 20s and undertook her first major translation – the memoirs of Russian artist Leonid Pasternak, father of the poet and novelist Boris – when her three children were under five years of age. The book was published by Quartet, owned by Naim Attallah.

Erdal worked for Attallah for 20 years, first as a translator of Russian novels, then as a commissioning editor, starting the series "Quartet Encounters", and finally as unacknowledged ghostwriter. For Attallah, she researched, wrote the questions for, and edited in-depth interviews for the collection Women, and eight further volumes of interviews. Other writing she did under his name included two novels, a weekly newspaper column, book reviews, letters, poems and even love letters.

Ghosting, which was published in 2004, was the first book written under her own name. Described by Boyd Tonkin, literary editor of The Independent, as a "modest classic", it was chosen as a BBC Radio 4 Book of the Week. Its literary merit led it to be shortlisted for the Saltire Society First Book Award and for the J. R. Ackerley Prize for Autobiography. Originally brought out by Canongate Books, it was published by Doubleday in Canada and the US, by Cossee in the Netherlands and by Aufbau in Germany.

In 2012, the first novel written under Erdal's own name, The Missing Shade of Blue: A Philosophical Adventure, was published by Little, Brown. The title is drawn from a passage in the work of David Hume, the Scottish Enlightenment philosopher, in which he argues (against his own empiricism) that it is possible to imagine something not yet experienced – a theme of the novel.

Erdal died at home in Anstruther on 23 May 2020.
