= Eric Archibald =

Scottish footballer (born 1965)

Personal information
- Date of birth: 25 March 1965 (age 61)
- Place of birth: Dunfermline, Scotland
- Positions: Central defender; right back

Youth career
- Hill of Beath Swifts

Senior career*
Years	Team	Apps	(Gls)
–1982	Inverkeithing United		
1982–1983	Cowdenbeath	0	(0)
1983–1986	Hill of Beath Hawthorn		
1986–1988	Raith Rovers	25	(0)
1988–1989	Hill of Beath Hawthorn		
1989–1993	Cowdenbeath	127	(3)
1993–1996	Forfar Athletic	49	(2)
1996–1998	Newtongrange Star		
1998	East Fife	2	(0)
1999	Cowdenbeath	0	(0)
- Newburgh
- * Club domestic league appearances and goals

Eric Archibald (born 25 March 1965) is a Scottish retired footballer who made over 120 appearances as a central defender in the Scottish League for Cowdenbeath. He captained the club and later became a youth coach.

== Personal life ==
Archibald attended Beath High School.

== Career statistics ==
Appearances and goals by club, season and competition
Club	Season	League			Scottish Cup		League Cup		Other		Total	
Club	Season	Division	Apps	Goals	Apps	Goals	Apps	Goals	Apps	Goals	Apps	Goals
Forfar Athletic	1993–94	Scottish Second Division	24	1	2	0	0	0	0	0	26	1
Forfar Athletic	1994–95	Scottish Third Division	16	1	1	0	1	0	1 (Note: Appearance in Scottish Challenge Cup)	0	19	1
Forfar Athletic	1995–96	Scottish Second Division	9	0	0	0	0	0	0	0	9	0
Forfar Athletic	Total		49	2	3	0	1	0	1	0	54	2
East Fife	1998–99	Scottish Second Division	2	0	—		—		—		2	0
Cowdenbeath	1998–99	Scottish Third Division	0	0	—		—		—		0	0
Career total			51	2	3	0	1	0	1	0	56	2

== Honours ==
Cowdenbeath

- Scottish League Second Division second-place promotion: 1991–92

Forfar Athletic

- Scottish League Third Division: 1994–95

Individual

- Cowdenbeath Player of the Year: 1991–92
- Cowdenbeath Hall of Fame
