= 1932–33 Hibernian F.C. season =

Hibernian
1932–33 season
- Manager: Bobby Templeton
- Scottish Second Division: 1st
- Scottish Cup: R4
- Average home league attendance: 6,236 (up 2,184)

During the 1932–33 season Hibernian, a football club based in Edinburgh, came first out of 20 clubs in the Scottish Second Division and won promotion to the Scottish First Division.

== Scottish Second Division ==
Match Day	Date	Opponent	H/A	Score	Hibernian Scorer(s)	Attendance
1	13 August	Dundee United	H	2–0		10,000
2	20 August	Albion Rovers	A	0–2		3,000
3	24 August	Montrose	H	4–1		3,000
4	27 August	East Fife	H	2–1		8,000
5	3 September	Dunfermline Athletic	A	2–2		2,500
6	10 September	Leith Athletic	H	3–0		7,000
7	15 September	Armadale	A	4–2		1,000
8	17 September	Brechin City	A	4–2		2,000
9	24 September	King's Park	H	0–1		4,000
10	1 October	Arbroath	A	3–0		2,000
11	8 October	Bo'ness	H	7–0		3,000
12	15 October	Edinburgh City	A	4–0		4,000
13	22 October	Alloa Athletic	A	3–0		1,500
14	29 October	Raith Rovers	H	2–1		15,000
15	5 November	Montrose	A	3–1		2,000
16	12 November	Armadale	H	8–2		4,000
17	19 November	St Bernard's	A	1–0		15,000
18	26 November	Stenhousemuir	H	4–1		6,000
19	3 December	Dumbarton	A	2–3		2,000
20	10 December	Queen of the South	A	0–0		6,000
21	17 December	Forfar Athletic	H	2–0		4,000
22	24 December	Dundee United	A	2–0		3,500
23	31 December	Albion Rovers	H	2–1		7,000
24	2 January	Leith Athletic	A	1–0		10,000
25	3 January	Brechin City	H	3–1		4,000
26	7 January	East Fife	A	5–0		3,000
27	14 January	Dunfermline Athletic	H	3–1		10,000
28	28 January	King's Park	A	0–0		3,000
29	11 February	Arbroath	H	2–0		6,000
30	18 February	Edinburgh City	H	7–1		1,500
31	11 March	Alloa Athletic	H	1–0		5,000
32	18 March	Raith Rovers	A	2–1		2,500
33	25 March	St Bernard's	H	4–1		8,000
34	8 April	Stenhousemuir	A	2–3		2,500
35	15 April	Dumbarton	H	1–0		3,000
36	22 April	Queen of the South	H	1–2		10,000
37	29 April	Forfar Athletic	A	3–3		1,500

=== Final League table ===
P	Team	Pld	W	D	L	GF	GA	GD	Pts
1	Hibernian	37	28	4	5	99	33	66	60
2	Queen of the South	35	21	9	5	103	59	44	51
3	Dunfermline Athletic	35	21	7	7	98	45	53	49

Armadale & Bo'ness were expelled from the Scottish Football League for failing to meet match guarantees; their records were expunged.

=== Scottish Cup ===
Round	Date	Opponent	H/A	Score	Hibernian Scorer(s)	Attendance
R1	21 January	Forfar Athletic	H	2–2		8,000
R1 R	26 January	Forfar Athletic	A	3–7		1,700
R2	4 February	Aberdeen	A	1–1		16,262
R2 R	8 February	Aberdeen	H	1–0		23,790
R3	18 February	Bye into R4				
R4	4 March	Heart of Midlothian	H	0–0		33,579
R4 R	8 March	Heart of Midlothian	A	0–2		41,034

== See also ==
- List of Hibernian F.C. seasons
