= Bill Hodge =

Scottish football manager and chairman

Personal information
- Date of birth: 1882
- Place of birth: Scotland
- Date of death: 1958 (aged 75–76)

Managerial career
- Years: Team
- 1938–1939: Cowdenbeath

Bill Hodge (1882–1958) was a Scottish football manager who managed Scottish League club Cowdenbeath. He also was chairman of the club for 19 years until stepping down in 1955.

== Managerial career ==
Hodge managed Scottish League Second Division club Cowdenbeath between 1938 and 1939 and managed the club to the division championship in his only full season in management. The outbreak of the Second World War in September 1939 prematurely ended the club's first top-flight season for five years. Hodge recorded 37 wins, 6 draws and 14 defeats in all competitions.

== Honours ==
Cowdenbeath

- Scottish League Second Division: 1938–39
