= 1935–36 Hibernian F.C. season =

Hibernian
1935–36 season
- Manager: Bobby Templeton (to 11 February); Johnny Halligan (caretaker manager, from 12 February to 27 April)
- Scottish First Division: 17th
- Scottish Cup: R2
- Average home league attendance: 9,726 (down 644)

During the 1935–36 season Hibernian, a football club based in Edinburgh, came seventeenth out of 20 clubs in the Scottish First Division.

== Scottish First Division ==
Match Day	Date	Opponent	H/A	Score	Hibernian Scorer(s)	Attendance
1	10 August	Queen of the South	A	1–1		4,254
2	17 August	Clyde	H	1–1		12,000
3	24 August	Aberdeen	A	1–3		15,000
4	28 August	Arbroath	H	0–2		6,000
5	31 August	St Johnstone	H	0–2		8,000
6	7 September	Queen's Park	A	1–6		7,300
7	14 September	Rangers	H	1–1		18,000
8	18 September	Airdrieonians	H	2–3		5,000
9	21 September	Heart of Midlothian	A	3–8		27,014
10	28 September	Kilmarnock	H	3–1		5,000
11	5 October	Hamilton Academical	A	3–2		4,000
12	12 October	Albion Rovers	H	3–0		3,500
13	19 October	Dundee	H	2–1		8,000
14	26 October	Partick Thistle	A	1–2		10,000
15	2 November	Ayr United	A	0–3		7,000
16	9 November	Celtic	H	0–3		10,000
17	16 November	Third Lanark	A	1–1		6,000
18	23 November	Motherwell	H	2–3		9,000
19	30 November	Dunfermline Athletic	H	2–3		4,000
20	7 December	Arbroath	A	2–3		4,000
21	14 December	Airdrieonians	A	2–3		2,000
22	21 December	Queen of the South	H	3–0		4,000
23	28 December	Clyde	A	4–7		14,000
24	1 January	Heart of Midlothian	H	1–1		37,306
25	2 January	St Johnstone	A	2–2		6,000
26	4 January	Aberdeen	H	1–4		22,000
27	11 January	Queen's Park	H	0–1		9,000
28	15 February	Hamilton Academical	H	3–2		11,000
29	29 February	Albion Rovers	A	1–0		1,000
30	7 March	Dundee	A	1–2		6,000
31	14 March	Partick Thistle	H	2–0		4,000
32	18 March	Rangers	A	0–3		7,000
33	21 March	Ayr United	H	0–1		4,000
34	28 March	Celtic	A	1–4		20,000
35	8 April	Kilmarnock	A	1–0		4,000
36	11 April	Third Lanark	H	3–0		4,000
37	18 April	Motherwell	A	1–1		2,000
38	25 April	Dunfermline Athletic	A	1–0		8,000

=== Final League table ===
P	Team	Pld	W	D	L	GF	GA	GD	Pts
16	Albion Rovers	38	13	4	21	69	92	–23	30
17	Hibernian	38	11	7	20	56	82	–26	29
18	Clyde	38	10	8	20	63	84	–21	28

=== Scottish Cup ===
Round	Date	Opponent	H/A	Score	Hibernian Scorer(s)	Attendance
R1	1 February	Vale Ocuba	A	3–1		2,622
R2	8 February	Clyde	A	1–4		11,000

== See also ==
- List of Hibernian F.C. seasons
