= Paddy Wilson (footballer) =

Scottish footballer

Personal information
- Date of birth: 25 June 1946 (age 80)
- Place of birth: High Valleyfield, Scotland
- Height: 5 ft 9 in (1.75 m)
- Position: Outside right

Senior career*
Years	Team	Apps	(Gls)
–1962	Blairhall Colliery		
1962–1966	Dunfermline Athletic	7	(2)
1966–1968	Aberdeen	5	(0)
1968–1971	Raith Rovers	75	(13)
1971–1976	Berwick Rangers	76	(8)
1976	Cowdenbeath	3	(0)

Managerial career
- 1977–1980: Cowdenbeath
- * Club domestic league appearances and goals

Paddy Wilson (born 25 June 1946), sometimes known as Pat Wilson, is a Scottish retired footballer who played in the Scottish League for Berwick Rangers, Raith Rovers, Dunfermline Athletic, Aberdeen and Cowdenbeath as an outside right. He was the first substitute to be utilised by Aberdeen in a competitive match. After his retirement as a player, Wilson managed Cowdenbeath.

== Personal life ==
Wilson's father was involved in football and managed Blairhall Colliery in the early 1960s. After leaving football, Wilson worked as a salesman in the drinks industry and ran the East Port Bar in Dunfermline.

== Career statistics ==
=== Club ===
Appearances and goals by club, season and competition
Club	Season	League			Scottish Cup		League Cup		Other		Total	
Club	Season	Division	Apps	Goals	Apps	Goals	Apps	Goals	Apps	Goals	Apps	Goals
Aberdeen	1966–67	Scottish First Division	5	0	0	0	1	0	0	0	6	0
Aberdeen	1967–68	Scottish First Division	1	0	0	0	3	0	0	0	4	0
Aberdeen	Total		6	0	0	0	4	0	0	0	10	0
Berwick Rangers	1971–72	Scottish Second Division	29	4	2	0	4	0	―		35	4
Berwick Rangers	1972–73	Scottish Second Division	18	1	0	0	1	0	―		19	1
Berwick Rangers	1973–74	Scottish Second Division	15	2	0	0	4	0	―		19	2
Berwick Rangers	1974–75	Scottish Second Division	14	1	1	0	5	0	―		20	1
Berwick Rangers	Total		76	8	3	0	14	0	―		93	8
Career total			82	8	3	0	18	0	0	0	103	8

=== Manager ===
Managerial record by team and tenure
Team	From	To	Record					Ref
Team	From	To	P	W	D	L	Win %	Ref
Cowdenbeath	1977	1980	125	45	32	48	36.0	
Total			125	45	32	48	36.0	—
