= Joe Parker (football manager) =

Scottish football manager

Personal information
- Place of birth: Scotland

Managerial career
- Years: Team
- 1905–1906: Cowdenbeath

Joe Parker was Scottish football manager who managed the Scottish League club Cowdenbeath. He was the first Cowdenbeath manager to manage a Scottish League match after the club's election into the league in 1905.
