= Andy Matthew =

Scottish footballer and manager

Personal information
- Date of birth: 19 July 1932
- Place of birth: Kirkcaldy, Scotland
- Date of death: 1992 (aged 59–60)
- Position: Winger

Youth career
- Bayview Y.C.

Senior career*
| Years | Team | Apps | (Gls) |
| 1951–1958 | East Fife | 145 | (27) |
| 1958–1960 | Rangers | 29 | (7) |
| 1960–1961 | Raith Rovers | 12 | (3) |
| 1961–1962 | Dunfermline Athletic | 3 | (0) |
| 1962–1969 | Cowdenbeath | 149 | (39) |
| Total | | 338 | (76) |

International career
| 1958 | SFL trial v SFA | 1 | (0) |

Managerial career
- 1968–1974: Cowdenbeath
- 1975–1978: Raith Rovers
- * Club domestic league appearances and goals

Andy Matthew (1932–1992) was a Scottish footballer who played in the successful East Fife post war team which enjoyed creditable league and cup success.

Matthew was selected once for Scotland in 1954 to play against the British Army; however, this match is not regarded as an official international.

After retiring as a player, Matthew became a manager.
