= George Sweet (football manager) =

Scottish football manager

Personal information
- Full name: George Millar Sweet
- Date of birth: 1897
- Place of birth: Cathcart, Scotland
- Date of death: 1969 (aged 71–72)
- Place of death: Longforgan, Scotland

Managerial career
- Years: Team
- c. 1937: Solway Star
- 1948–1951: Cowdenbeath

George Millar Sweet (1897–1969) was a Scottish football manager who managed Scottish League club Cowdenbeath and junior club Solway Star. He also served Cowdenbeath as treasurer, secretary and was a member of the club's board.

== Managerial career ==
Sweet managed Scottish League Second Division club Cowdenbeath between 9 August 1948 and 21 April 1951. His highest placing was fifth in the 1949–50 season and he left the role with a record of 45 wins, 18 draws and 53 defeats in all competitions.

== Personal life ==
In September 1916, in the middle of the First World War, Sweet was working as a bank clerk and enlisted in the Machine Gun Corps. By the end of the war in November 1918, he was serving in the Tank Corps. Sweet returned to his banking job and became a manager with Royal Bank of Scotland.
