= Willie Mercer =

Scottish footballer

Personal information
- Full name: William Mercer
- Date of birth: 8 November 1874
- Place of birth: Cowdenbeath, Scotland
- Date of death: 9 September 1932 (aged 57)
- Place of death: Fife, Scotland
- Position: Outside left

Senior career*
Years	Team	Apps	(Gls)
1894–1898	Cowdenbeath		
1898	Glossop	2	(1)
1898	Hibernian	9	(2)
1901–1902	Cowdenbeath		
–1905	Glossop	0	(0)
1905–1910	Cowdenbeath	43	(17)
- * Club domestic league appearances and goals

William Mercer (8 November 1874 – 9 September 1932) was a Scottish footballer who played as an outside left in the Scottish League for Cowdenbeath and Hibernian. He also played in the Football League for Glossop. After his retirement as a player, Mercer served Cowdenbeath as trainer and was secretary of junior club Vulcan Rovers.

== Personal life ==
Mercer worked as a miner and died after coming off his shift at Donibristle Colliery in 1932.

== Career statistics ==
Appearances and goals by club, season and competition
Club	Season	League			National Cup		Total	
Club	Season	Division	Apps	Goals	Apps	Goals	Apps	Goals
Hibernian	1898–99	Scottish First Division	9	2	0	0	9	2
Cowdenbeath	1904–05	Northern League	0	0	7	0	7	0
Cowdenbeath	1905–06	Scottish Second Division	18	7	1	0	19	1
Cowdenbeath	1907–08	Scottish Second Division	16	9	9	0	25	9
Cowdenbeath	1908–09	Scottish Second Division	9	1	0	0	9	1
Cowdenbeath	Total		43	17	10	0	53	17
Career total			52	19	10	0	62	19

== Honours ==
- Cowdenbeath Hall of Fame
