= William Sweet (disambiguation) =

William Sweet is a Canadian philosopher.

William Sweet may also refer to:

- William Ellery Sweet (1869–1942), Governor of Colorado
- William L. Sweet (1850–1931), New York politician
- William Russell Sweet (1860–1946), Rhode Island painter and sculptor
- Bill Sweet (born 1947), British bobsledder
- W. H. S. Sweet (William Henry Seward Sweet, 1838–1890), American soldier, politician, and farmer
