= David Sweet (disambiguation) =

David Sweet (born 1957) is a Canadian politician.

David Sweet may also refer to:

- David E. Sweet (1933–1984), American academic
- David W. Sweet (born 1948), American politician and lawyer
