= 1929–30 Scottish Division One =

31st season of top-tier football league in Scotland

Scottish Division One
- Season: 1929–30
- Champions: Rangers
- Relegated: Dundee United; St Johnstone

The 1929–30 Scottish Division One season was won by Rangers by five points over nearest rival Motherwell. Dundee United and St Johnstone finished 19th and 20th respectively and were relegated to the 1930–31 Scottish Division Two.

== League table ==
Pos	Team	Pld	W	D	L	GF	GA	GD	Pts
1	Rangers	38	28	4	6	94	32	+62	60
2	Motherwell	38	25	5	8	104	48	+56	55
3	Aberdeen	38	23	7	8	85	61	+24	53
4	Celtic	38	22	5	11	88	46	+42	49
5	St Mirren	38	18	5	15	73	56	+17	41
6	Partick Thistle	38	16	9	13	72	61	+11	41
7	Falkirk	38	16	9	13	62	64	−2	41
8	Kilmarnock	38	15	9	14	77	73	+4	39
9	Ayr United	38	16	6	16	70	92	−22	38
10	Heart of Midlothian	38	14	9	15	69	69	0	37
11	Clyde	38	13	11	14	64	69	−5	37
12	Airdrieonians	38	16	4	18	60	66	−6	36
13	Hamilton Academical	38	14	7	17	76	81	−5	35
14	Dundee	38	14	6	18	51	58	−7	34
15	Queen's Park	38	15	4	19	67	80	−13	34
16	Cowdenbeath	38	13	7	18	64	74	−10	33
17	Hibernian	38	9	11	18	45	62	−17	29
18	Morton	38	10	7	21	67	95	−28	27
19	Dundee United	38	7	8	23	56	109	−53	22
20	St Johnstone	38	6	7	25	48	96	−48	19

Source: "1929-1930 Division 1 - SPFL Archive". SPFL.

== Results ==
Home \ Away	ABE	AIR	AYR	CEL	CLY	COW	DNU	DND	FAL	HAM	HOM	HIB	KIL	MOR	MOT	PAR	QPA	RAN	STJ	STM
Aberdeen		3–1	4–1	3–1	5–2	2–0	1–0	2–2	1–0	4–2	2–2	2–0	4–3	5–3	2–2	2–1	3–0	1–1	1–0	3–3
Airdrieonians	0–2		2–0	0–1	2–4	4–1	3–2	3–4	4–1	1–0	3–2	3–0	2–2	2–2	2–0	2–0	1–2	1–0	5–1	2–2
Ayr United	5–1	3–1		1–3	2–2	3–1	2–2	6–1	0–0	3–3	3–1	3–2	1–1	2–0	3–2	2–4	2–5	0–3	4–0	0–1
Celtic	3–4	1–2	4–0		0–2	2–1	1–1	7–0	7–0	3–0	2–1	4–0	4–0	0–1	0–4	2–0	2–1	1–2	6–2	3–0
Clyde	1–3	2–0	3–1	2–3		4–1	1–1	3–2	1–2	3–1	3–3	0–2	1–1	2–1	1–2	2–3	2–1	3–3	2–0	1–2
Cowdenbeath	0–1	2–0	7–1	1–2	4–0		2–1	4–1	3–0	3–0	0–1	0–0	2–3	2–0	0–0	0–2	1–1	3–2	2–1	2–3
Dundee	0–3	3–0	3–0	2–2	0–1	3–0		1–0	0–0	3–2	3–0	4–0	2–2	3–2	0–3	2–4	1–0	1–3	0–1	1–3
Dundee United	2–4	0–3	1–2	2–2	3–3	2–1	0–1		2–2	1–2	2–3	2–2	6–4	3–1	1–1	3–2	2–1	0–1	1–1	0–2
Falkirk	3–2	3–2	1–1	0–1	1–1	2–2	5–2	5–2		1–0	2–3	1–1	1–0	3–0	4–1	0–0	1–2	2–1	4–0	1–0
Hamilton Academical	4–2	0–1	6–2	2–3	1–1	5–1	2–0	5–2	0–2		2–1	3–2	1–1	4–2	2–3	2–1	4–2	1–1	3–0	2–0
Heart of Midlothian	2–2	1–0	1–2	1–3	0–1	2–2	1–0	3–1	0–2	6–4		1–1	1–1	4–0	3–2	0–0	0–3	2–0	2–2	5–0
Hibernian	0–1	3–1	1–0	0–2	1–1	1–1	0–1	3–0	1–0	1–2	1–1		0–0	0–1	1–1	3–0	6–3	0–2	3–1	2–2
Kilmarnock	4–2	7–1	2–0	1–1	2–1	3–2	0–2	0–2	3–2	3–0	2–1	3–1		7–2	2–3	1–1	1–5	1–0	3–1	2–3
Morton	1–2	1–1	3–4	1–2	1–2	3–4	2–1	6–1	1–1	4–4	3–2	3–2	4–2		1–3	2–2	2–4	2–2	4–1	2–0
Motherwell	4–1	2–0	4–1	2–1	2–1	7–2	3–0	6–1	4–3	5–1	0–2	3–0	2–0	3–0		4–0	9–0	0–2	5–0	3–0
Partick Thistle	2–1	4–0	2–3	3–2	3–3	3–4	0–2	1–1	5–0	2–2	2–1	0–0	3–2	4–1	6–1		1–0	0–1	2–1	3–2
Queen's Park	2–2	1–3	2–3	2–1	1–1	1–2	2–1	1–0	2–0	2–0	6–2	2–0	1–4	2–4	0–3	4–1		1–3	3–0	1–0
Rangers	3–1	2–0	9–0	1–0	3–0	5–0	4–1	3–1	4–0	5–2	1–3	3–0	4–0	3–0	4–2	2–1	1–0		6–1	2–1
St Johnstone	0–1	2–1	2–3	1–6	3–1	1–1	0–1	6–1	3–4	2–2	0–3	4–3	1–3	1–1	1–1	1–1	4–0	0–1		1–3
St Mirren	1–0	0–1	3–0	0–0	3–0	2–0	3–0	6–1	2–3	2–0	6–2	1–2	3–1	5–0	0–2	0–3	1–1	0–1	3–2	

Legend: Blue = home team win; Yellow = draw; Red = away team win.
