= John Sweet =

John Sweet may refer to:

- John Sweet (actor) (1916–2011), US Army sergeant serving in the UK in World War II and actor in A Canterbury Tale
- John Edson Sweet (1832–1916), American mechanical engineer who built the first micrometer caliper
- John Hyde Sweet (1880–1964), U.S. Representative from Nebraska
- John Sweet (canoeist), American slalom canoer who competed in the early 1980s
- John Sweet (rugby union), Scottish international rugby union player
