= Billy Mercer (footballer, born 1896) =

English footballer

Personal information
- Full name: William Mercer
- Date of birth: 14 March 1896
- Place of birth: Preston, England
- Date of death: 1975 (aged 78–79)
- Height: 5 ft 7 1/2 in (1.71 m)
- Position: Wing half

Senior career*
Years	Team	Apps	(Gls)
1919–1925	Preston North End	113	(0)
1925	Blackpool	1	(0)
- Lancaster Town
- Boston Town
- * Club domestic league appearances and goals

William Mercer (14 March 1896 — 1975) was an English footballer. He made over 100 Football League appearances for Preston North End.
