= Bobby Templeton (footballer, born 1894) =

Scottish footballer and manager

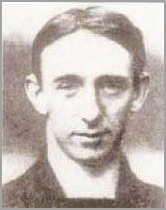

Personal information
- Full name: Robert Templeton
- Date of birth: 1894
- Place of birth: Paisley, Scotland
- Date of death: 1967 (aged 72–73)
- Place of death: Paisley, Scotland
- Position: Full back

Youth career
- Neilston Victoria

Senior career*
Years	Team	Apps	(Gls)
1911–1927	Hibernian	234	(4)

Managerial career
- 1925–1936: Hibernian
- * Club domestic league appearances and goals

Robert Templeton (1894 – 1967) was a Scottish football player and manager. He played primarily as a defender for Hibernian from 1911 until 1925, playing on the losing side in the 1914 Scottish Cup Final but not featuring in the consecutive defeats of 1923 and 1924. He then managed the club from 1925 to 1936, occasionally filling in as a player in the first few seasons (including as goalkeeper) and eventually taking charge of over 400 matches – the Hibees were relegated from the top division in 1930–31 but returned as winners of the lower tier in 1932–33. He was born and died in Paisley.

== See also ==
- List of one-club men in association football
- List of outfield association footballers who played in goal
