= Dundee United F.C. in European football =

Scottish club in European football

Dundee United in Europe
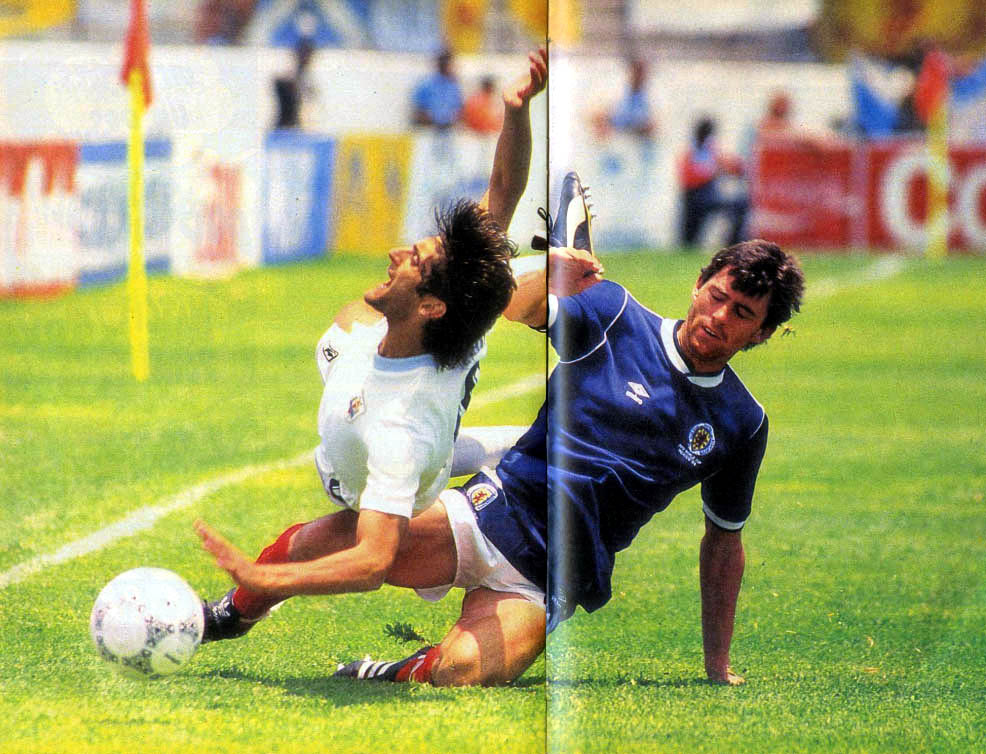
- David Narey made a record 76 appearances in European matches for Dundee United
- Club: Dundee United
- First entry: 1966–67 Inter-Cities Fairs Cup
- Latest entry: 2025–26 UEFA Conference League

Titles
- Champions League: Best: Semi-finalists 1983-84
- Europa League: Best: Finalists 1986-87
- Cup Winners' Cup: Best: Second round
- Conference League: Best: Third Qualifying Round
- Inter-Cities Fairs Cup: Best: Third round

Dundee United Football Club is a Scottish association football club based in the city of Dundee. The club's first ever tie in European competition was in the 1966–67 Inter-Cities Fairs Cup where they knocked out holders Barcelona in the Second round winning both legs in the process before losing in the following round to Italian giants Juventus despite winning the home leg 1–0. They had their best spell in the 1980s, reaching the semi-final of the European Cup in 1984 and the final of the UEFA Cup in 1987 with famous victories over Barcelona, AS Roma, Rapid Vienna and Borussia Mönchengladbach along the way. They also reached the quarter-final stage of the latter in both 1982 and 1983. In total they have won 49 games in European competition, currently more than any Scottish club outside the Old Firm and Aberdeen.

== Overall record ==
=== By competition ===
Competition	P	W	D	L	GF	GA	GD
European Cup/Champions League	8	5	1	2	14	5	+9
UEFA Cup/Europa League	82	33	25	24	134	89	+45
UEFA Conference League	6	3	2	1	7	11	−4
Cup Winners' Cup	10	3	3	4	9	10	−1
Inter-Cities Fairs Cup	10	5	1	4	11	12	-1
Total	116	49	32	35	175	127	+48

== Match table ==
Season	Competition	Round	Opponent	Home	Away	Agg.	Qual.
1966–67	Fairs Cup	2R	(Spain) Barcelona	2–0	2–1	4–1	
1966–67	Fairs Cup	3R	(Italy) Juventus	1–0	0–3	1–3	
1969–70	Fairs Cup	R1	(England) Newcastle United	1–2	0–1	1–3	
1970–71	Fairs Cup	R1	(Switzerland) Grasshoppers	3–2	0–0	3–2	
1970–71	Fairs Cup	R2	(Czechoslovakia) Sparta Prague	1–0	1–3	2–3	
1974–75	Cup Winners' Cup	R1	(Romania) Jiul Petroşani	3–0	0–2	3–2	
1974–75	Cup Winners' Cup	R2	(Turkey) Bursaspor	0–0	0–1	0–1	
1975–76	UEFA Cup	R1	(Iceland) Keflavík	4–0	2–0	6–0	
1975–76	UEFA Cup	R2	(Portugal) Porto	1–2	1–1	2–3	
1977–78	UEFA Cup	R1	(Denmark) KB Copenhagen	1–0	0–3	1–3	
1978–79	UEFA Cup	R1	(Belgium) Standard Liège	0–0	0–1	0–1	
1979–80	UEFA Cup	R1	(Belgium) Anderlecht	0–0	1–1	1–1 (a)	
1979–80	UEFA Cup	R2	(Hungary) Diósgyőri	0–1	1–3	1–4	
1980–81	UEFA Cup	R1	(Poland) Śląsk Wrocław	7–2	0–0	7–2	
1980–81	UEFA Cup	R2	(Belgium) Lokeren	1–1	0–0	1–1 (a)	
1981–82	UEFA Cup	R1	(France) AS Monaco	1–2	5–2	6–4	
1981–82	UEFA Cup	R2	(West Germany) Borussia Mönchengladbach	5–0	0–2	5–2	
1981–82	UEFA Cup	R3	(Belgium) SV Winterslag	5–0	0–0	5–0	
1981–82	UEFA Cup	QF	(Socialist Federal Republic of Yugoslavia) Radnički Niš	2–0	0–3	2–3	
1982–83	UEFA Cup	R1	(Netherlands) PSV Eindhoven	1–1	2–0	3–1	
1982–83	UEFA Cup	R2	(Norway) Viking Stavanger	0–0	3–1	3–1	
1982–83	UEFA Cup	R3	(West Germany) Werder Bremen	2–1	1–1	3–2	
1982–83	UEFA Cup	QF	(Czechoslovakia) Bohemians Prague	0–0	0–1	0–1	
1983–84	European Cup	R1	(Malta) Ħamrun Spartans	3–0	3–0	6–0	
1983–84	European Cup	R2	(Belgium) Standard Liège	4–0	0–0	4–0	
1983–84	European Cup	QF	(Austria) Rapid Vienna	1–0	1–2	2–2 (a)	
1983–84	European Cup	SF	(Italy) Roma	2–0	0–3	2–3	
1984–85	UEFA Cup	R1	(Sweden) AIK Stockholm	3–0	0–1	3–1	
1984–85	UEFA Cup	R2	(Austria) LASK Linz	5–1	2–1	7–2	
1984–85	UEFA Cup	R3	(England) Manchester United	2–3	2–2	4–5	
1985–86	UEFA Cup	R1	(Republic of Ireland) Bohemians	2–2	5–2	7–4	
1985–86	UEFA Cup	R2	(Socialist Federal Republic of Yugoslavia) Vardar Skopje	2–0	1–1	3–1	
1985–86	UEFA Cup	R3	(Switzerland) Neuchâtel Xamax	2–1	1–3	3–4 (a.e.t.)	
1986–87	UEFA Cup	R1	(France) Lens	2–0	0–1	2–1	
1986–87	UEFA Cup	R2	(Romania) Universitatea Craiova	3–0	0–1	3–1	
1986–87	UEFA Cup	R3	(Socialist Federal Republic of Yugoslavia) Hajduk Split	2–0	0–0	2–0	
1986–87	UEFA Cup	QF	(Spain) Barcelona	1–0	2–1	3–1	
1986–87	UEFA Cup	SF	(West Germany) Borussia Mönchengladbach	0–0	2–0	2–0	
1986–87	UEFA Cup	Final	(Sweden) IFK Göteborg	1–1	0–1	1–2	
1987–88	UEFA Cup	R1	(Northern Ireland) Coleraine	3–1	1–0	4–1	
1987–88	UEFA Cup	R2	(Czechoslovakia) TJ Vítkovice	1–2	1–1	2–3	
1988–89	Cup Winners' Cup	R1	(Malta) Floriana	1–0	0–0	1–0	
1988–89	Cup Winners' Cup	R2	(Romania) Dinamo Bucharest	0–1	1–1	1–2	
1989–90	UEFA Cup	R1	(Northern Ireland) Glentoran	2–0	3–1	5–1	
1989–90	UEFA Cup	R2	(Belgium) Royal Antwerp	3–2	0–4	3–6	
1990–91	UEFA Cup	R1	(Iceland) FH	2–2	3–1	5–3	
1990–91	UEFA Cup	R2	(Netherlands) Vitesse Arnhem	0–4	0–1	0–5	
1993–94	UEFA Cup	R1	(Denmark) Brøndby IF	3–1	0–2	3–3 (a)	
1994–95	Cup Winners' Cup	R1	(Slovakia) Tatran Prešov	3–2	1–3	4–5	
1997–98	UEFA Cup	QR1	(Andorra) CE Principat	9–0	8–0	17–0	
1997–98	UEFA Cup	QR2	(Turkey) Trabzonspor	1–1	0–1	1–2	
2005–06	UEFA Cup	QR2	(Finland) MyPa-47	2–2	0–0	2–2 (a)	
2010–11	Europa League	PO	(Greece) AEK Athens	0–1	1–1	1–2	
2011–12	Europa League	QR2	(Poland) Śląsk Wrocław	3–2	0–1	3–3 (a)	
2012–13	Europa League	QR3	(Russia) Dynamo Moscow	2–2	0–5	2–7	
2022–23	Conference League	QR3	(Netherlands) AZ	1–0	0–7	1–7	
2025–26	Conference League	QR2	(Luxembourg) UNA Strassen	1–0	1–0	2–0	
2025–26	Conference League	QR3	(Austria) Rapid Vienna	2–2	2–2	4-4 (4-5 p)	

== Record by country of opposition ==
Country	Pld	W	D	L	GF	GA	GD	Win%	Ref
Andorra	2	2	0	0	17	0	+17	100.00	
Austria	6	3	2	1	13	8	+5	50.00	
Belgium	12	3	7	2	14	9	+5	25.00	
Czechoslovakia	6	1	2	3	4	7	−3	16.67	
Denmark	4	2	0	2	4	6	−2	50.00	
England	4	0	1	3	5	8	−3	0.00	
Finland	2	0	2	0	2	2	+0	0.00	
France	4	2	0	2	8	5	+3	50.00	
Greece	2	0	1	1	1	2	−1	0.00	
Hungary	2	0	0	2	1	4	−3	0.00	
Iceland	4	3	1	0	11	3	+8	75.00	
Ireland	2	1	1	0	7	4	+3	50.00	
Italy	4	2	0	2	3	6	−3	50.00	
Luxembourg	2	2	0	0	2	0	+2	100.00	
Malta	4	3	1	0	7	0	+7	75.00	
Netherlands	6	2	1	3	4	13	−9	33.33	
Northern Ireland	4	4	0	0	9	2	+7	100.00	
Norway	2	1	1	0	3	1	+2	50.00	
Poland	4	2	1	1	10	5	+5	50.00	
Portugal	2	0	1	1	2	3	−1	0.00	
Romania	6	2	1	3	7	5	+2	33.33	
Russia	2	0	1	1	2	7	−5	0.00	
Slovakia	2	1	0	1	4	5	−1	50.00	
Spain	4	4	0	0	7	2	+5	100.00	
Sweden	4	1	1	2	4	3	+1	25.00	
Switzerland	4	2	1	1	6	6	+0	50.00	
Turkey	4	0	2	2	1	3	−2	0.00	
West Germany	6	3	2	1	10	4	+6	50.00	
Yugoslavia	6	3	2	1	7	4	+3	50.00	

== Player Records ==
Appearances
	Name	Career	Apps
1	(Scotland) David Narey	1973–1994	76
2	(Scotland) Paul Hegarty	1974–1990	68
3	(Scotland) Paul Sturrock	1974–1989	60
3	(Scotland) Maurice Malpas	1979–2000	60
5	(Scotland) Hamish McAlpine	1966–1986	52
6	(Scotland) Eamonn Bannon	1979–1988	51
7	(Scotland) Billy Kirkwood	1976–1986	44
8	(Scotland) John Holt	1973–1987	43
9	(Scotland) Ralph Milne	1979–1987	41
10	(Scotland) Davie Dodds	1975–1986	40

Top goalscorers
	Name	Career	Goals
1	(Scotland) Ralph Milne	1979–1987	15
2	(Scotland) Paul Hegarty	1974–1990	12
3	(Scotland) Davie Dodds	1975–1986	11
3	(Scotland) Paul Sturrock	1974–1989	11
5	(Scotland) John Clark	1981–1994	9
6	(Scotland) Eamonn Bannon	1979–1988	8
7	(Scotland) Ian Redford	1985–1988	7
8	(Scotland) Dave Narey	1973–1994	6
8	(Scotland) Robbie Winters	1992–1998	6
8	(Scotland) Gary McSwegan	1995–1998	6
