= 1982–83 Dundee United F.C. season =

Dundee United
1982–83 season
- Manager: Jim McLean
- Stadium: Tannadice Park
- Premier Division: Winners
- Scottish Cup: Third Round
- League Cup: Semi-finals
- UEFA Cup: Quarter-finals
- Top goalscorer: League: Davie Dodds (22); All: Davie Dodds (28)
- Highest home attendance: 20,009 vs. Celtic, Premier Division, 2 October 1982
- Lowest home attendance: 4,391 vs. Falkirk, League Cup, 25 August 1982

The 1982–83 season was the 74th year of football played by Dundee United, and covers the period from 1 July 1982 to 30 June 1983. The team won the Scottish league championship for the first and only time, securing European Cup football for the following season.

== Results and fixtures ==
Dundee United played a total of 55 competitive matches during the 1982–83 season.

All results are written with Dundee United's score first. Own goals in italics

=== Scottish Premier Division ===
Date	Opponent	Venue	Result	Attendance	Scorers
4 September 1982	Aberdeen	H	2–0	11,683	Malpas, Dodds
11 September 1982	Rangers	A	0–0	22,725	
18 September 1982	Hibernian	A	0–0	5,562	
25 September 1982	St Mirren	H	3–0	6,832	Sturrock (2), Milne
2 October 1982	Celtic	H	2–2	20,009	Dodds, Milne
9 October 1982	Kilmarnock	A	1–1	2,446	Milne (penalty)
16 October 1982	Greenock Morton	H	6–0	5,986	Dodds (3), Narey (2), Kirkwood
23 October 1982	Motherwell	A	2–0	4,455	Narey, Kirkwood
30 October 1982	Dundee	H	1–0	14,959	Dodds
6 November 1982	Aberdeen	A	1–5	13,958	Gough
13 November 1982	Rangers	H	4–2	16,470	Milne (2), Dodds, Gough
20 November 1982	Hibernian	H	3–0	7,374	Bannon, Reilly, Dodds
27 November 1982	St Mirren	A	2–0	16,972	Bannon, Dodds
11 December 1982	Kilmarnock	H	7–0	7,259	Reilly (2), Dodds (2), Bannon, Narey, Milne
18 December 1982	Greenock Morton	A	2–1	1,987	Reilly, Sturrock
27 December 1982	Motherwell	H	5–0	7,682	Milne, Bannon (penalty), Reilly, Hegarty, Sturrock
1 January 1983	Dundee	A	2–0	18,109	Milne (2)
3 January 1983	Aberdeen	H	0–3	17,831	
8 January 1983	Rangers	A	1–2	15,434	Reilly
15 January 1983	Hibernian	A	0–0	5,043	
22 January 1983	St Mirren	H	3–2	6,714	Dodds (2), Kirkwood
5 February 1983	Celtic	H	1–1	17,289	Dodds
12 February 1983	Kilmarnock	A	5–0	1,834	Holt (3), Bannon, Dodds
26 February 1983	Greenock Morton	H	1–1	5,986	Gough
5 March 1983	Motherwell	A	4–1	3,589	Gough (2), Dodds, Milne
12 March 1983	Dundee	H	5–3	13,448	Gough (2), Reilly, Hegarty, Dodds
19 March 1983	Aberdeen	A	2–1	23,001	Milne (2)
26 March 1983	Hibernian	H	3–3	7,279	Dodds, Britton, Gough
2 April 1983	Rangers	H	3–1	14,151	Sturrock (2), Milne
6 April 1983	Celtic	A	0–2	34,508	
9 April 1983	St Mirren	A	2–1	4,617	Bannon (penalty), Sturrock
20 April 1983	Celtic	A	3–2	23,965	Hegarty, Bannon (penalty), Milne
23 April 1983	Kilmarnock	H	4–0	7,516	Stark (2), Holt, Sturrock
30 April 1983	Greenock Morton	A	4–0	6,920	Dodds (2), Narey, Milne
7 May 1983	Motherwell	H	4–0	11,933	Bannon (2 including 1 penalty), Dodds (2)
14 May 1983	Dundee	A	2–1	29,106	Milne, Bannon

=== Scottish Cup ===
Date	Rd	Opponent	Venue	Result	Attendance	Scorers
29 January 1983	Third round	St Mirren	A	0–1	7,020	

=== Scottish League Cup ===
Date	Rd	Opponent	Venue	Result	Attendance	Scorers
14 August 1982	Group stage	St Johnstone	H	3–0	7,001	Kirkwood, Dodds, Sturrock
18 August 1982	Group stage	Falkirk	A	4–0	2,128	Narey, Sturrock, Malpas, Milne
21 August 1982	Group stage	Raith Rovers	H	5–1	5,039	Narey (2), Payne, Britton, Milne
25 August 1982	Group stage	Falkirk	H	4–0	4,391	Dodds (2), Sturrock, Payne
28 August 1982	Group stage	St Johnstone	A	3–0	4,092	Dodds, Bannon, Kirkwood
1 September 1982	Group stage	Raith Rovers	A	3–1	1,934	Bannon, Dodds, Sturrock
22 September 1982	Quarter-finals 1st leg	Aberdeen	A	3–1	14,292	Gough, Bannon, Kirkwood
6 October 1982	Quarter-finals 2nd leg	Aberdeen	H	1–0	11,753	Sturrock
27 October 1982	Semi-finals 1st leg	Celtic	A	0–2	19,149	
10 November 1982	Semi-finals 2nd leg	Celtic	H	2–1	15,522	Sturrock

=== UEFA Cup ===
Date	Rd	Opponent	Venue	Result	Attendance	Scorers
15 September 1982	First round 1st leg	(Netherlands) PSV Eindhoven	H	1–1	13,223	Dodds
29 September 1982	First round 2nd leg	(Netherlands) PSV Eindhoven	A	2–0	12,500	Kirkwood, Hegarty
20 October 1982	Second round 1st leg	(Norway) Viking	A	3–1	8,890	Milne (2 including penalty), Sturrock
2 November 1982	Second round 2nd leg	(Norway) Viking	H	0–0	10,611	
24 November 1982	Third round 1st leg	(West Germany) Werder Bremen	H	2–1	10,827	Milne, Narey
8 December 1982	Third round 2nd leg	(West Germany) Werder Bremen	A	1–1	37,500	Hegarty
2 March 1983	Quarter-finals 1st leg	(Czechoslovakia) Bohemians	A	0–1	16,000	
16 March 1983	Quarter-finals 2nd leg	(Czechoslovakia) Bohemians	H	0–0	21,336	

== Competitions ==
=== League table ===
Pos	Team	Pld	W	D	L	GF	GA	GD	Pts	Qualification or relegation
1	Dundee United (C)	36	24	8	4	90	35	+55	56	Qualification for the European Cup first round
2	Celtic	36	25	5	6	90	36	+54	55	Qualification for the UEFA Cup first round
3	Aberdeen	36	25	5	6	76	25	+51	55	Qualification for the Cup Winners' Cup first round
4	Rangers	36	13	12	11	53	41	+12	38	Qualification for the Cup Winners' Cup first round
5	St Mirren	36	11	12	13	47	51	−4	34	Qualification for the UEFA Cup first round

Source: Statto
Rules for classification: 1) points; 2) goal difference; 3) number of goals scored.
(C) Champions

=== League cup table ===
Team	Pld	W	D	L	GF	GA	GD	Pts
Dundee United	6	6	0	0	22	2	+20	12
St Johnstone	6	3	1	2	15	10	+5	7
Falkirk	6	1	1	4	3	15	−12	3
Raith Rovers	6	0	2	4	5	18	−13	2

== See also ==
- 1982–83 in Scottish football
