= 1977–78 Dundee United F.C. season =

Dundee United
1977–78 season
- Manager: Jim McLean
- Stadium: Tannadice Park
- Scottish Premier Division: 3rd (UEFA Cup); W18 D8 L10 F42 A32 P44
- Scottish Cup: Semi-finalists
- League Cup: Quarter-finalists
- UEFA Cup: 1st Round

The 1977–78 season was the 69th year of football played by Dundee United, and covers the period from 1 July 1977 to 30 June 1978. United finished in third place, securing UEFA Cup football for the following season.

== Match results ==
Dundee United played a total of 50 competitive matches during the 1977–78 season.

=== Legend ===
Win
Draw
Loss

All results are written with Dundee United's score first. Own goals in italics

=== Premier Division ===
Date	Opponent	Venue	Result	Attendance	Scorers
13 August 1977	Celtic	A	0–0	33,159	
20 August 1977	St Mirren	H	2–1	7,658	Wallace, Addison
27 August 1977	Aberdeen	A	0–0	17,082	
10 September 1977	Hibernian	H	2–0	6,518	Kirkwood, Rolland (penalty)
17 September 1977	Clydebank	A	3–0	2,853	Sturrock, Bourke, Fleming
24 September 1977	Motherwell	H	3–1	7,810	Fleming, Sturrock, Bourke
1 October 1977	Ayr United	A	2–0	3,281	Hegarty, McAnespie
8 October 1977	Rangers	H	0–1	18,571	
15 October 1977	Partick Thistle	A	1–2	4,657	Sturrock
22 October 1977	Celtic	H	1–2	17,198	Fleming
29 October 1977	St Mirren	A	1–0	9,528	Bourke
5 November 1977	Aberdeen	H	0–1	10,130	
12 November 1977	Hibernian	A	0–0	5,666	
19 November 1977	Clydebank	H	4–0	4,069	Fleming, Bourke, Wallace, Hegarty
26 November 1977	Motherwell	A	0–0	4,841	
10 December 1977	Rangers	A	0–2	21,075	
17 December 1977	Partick Thistle	H	2–2	5,098	Wallace (2)
24 December 1977	Celtic	A	0–1	20,246	
31 December 1977	St Mirren	H	2–1	7,645	Dodds, Hegarty
2 January 1978	Aberdeen	A	0–1	24,208	
7 January 1978	Hibernian	H	1–1	6,880	Bourke
4 February 1978	Ayr United	A	1–0	3,231	Fleming
25 February 1978	Partick Thistle	A	2–0	3,539	Fleming, Kirkwood
4 March 1978	Celtic	H	0–1	14,167	
15 March 1978	St Mirren	A	2–1	10,169	Holt, Fleming
18 March 1978	Aberdeen	H	0–0	9,671	
25 March 1978	Hibernian	A	1–3	8,354	Payne
29 March 1978	Motherwell	H	1–1	4,654	Holt
8 April 1978	Motherwel	A	1–0	4,907	Fleming
12 April 1978	Clydebank	H	1–0	3,550	Hegarty
15 April 1978	Ayr United	H	1–0	4,107	Kirkwood
19 April 1978	Rangers	H	0–1	17,293	
22 April 1978	Rangers	A	0–3	30,239	
26 April 1978	Ayr United	H	3–1	2,735	Holt, Fleming, Wallace
29 April 1978	Partick Thistle	H	5–2	3,646	Addison (2), Wallace, Stewart, Kirkwood
2 May 1978	Clydebank	A	0–2	1,030	

=== Scottish Cup ===
Date	Rd	Opponent	Venue	Result	Attendance	Scorers
28 January 1978	R3	Hamilton Academical	A	4–1	5,575	Addison (2), Hegarty, Payne
27 February 1978	R4	Queen of the South	H	3–0	8,000	Fleming, Hegarty (penalty), Bourke
11 March 1978	QF	Queen's Park	H	2–0	5,841	Addison, Sturrock (penalty)
5 April 1978	SF	Rangers	N	0–2	25,619	

=== League Cup ===
Date	Rd	Opponent	Venue	Result	Attendance	Scorers
17 August 1977	R1 1	Albion Rovers	H	5–0	3,128	Wallace, Sturrock, Kirkwood, Hegraty, Robinson
23 August 1977	R1 2	Albion Rovers	A	5–1	1,030	Wallace, Narey, Kirkwood, Sturrock, Hegraty
31 August 1977	R2 1	Partick Thistle	A	0–0	2,535	
3 September 1977	R2 2	Partick Thistle	H	1–0	5,907	Dodds
5 October 1977	R3 1	Arbroath	A	4–0	3,482	Kirkwood (3), Holt
26 October 1977	R3 2	Arbroath	H	2–1	3,107	Kirkwood, Sturrock
9 November 1977	QF 1	Heart of Midlothian	H	3–1	7,286	Kirkwood, Hegarty, Wallace
16 November 1977	QF 2	Heart of Midlothian	A	0–2	7,245	

=== UEFA Cup ===
Date	Rd	Opponent	Venue	Result	Attendance	Scorers
14 September 1977	R1 1	(Denmark) KB Copenhagen	H	1–0	8,500	Sturrock
27 September 1977	R1 2	(Denmark) KB Copenhagen	A	0–3	9,000	

== League table ==
Pos	Team	Pld	W	D	L	GF	GA	GD	Pts	Qualification or relegation
1	Rangers (C)	36	24	7	5	76	39	+37	55	Qualification for the European Cup first round
2	Aberdeen	36	22	9	5	68	29	+39	53	Qualification for the Cup Winners' Cup first round
3	Dundee United	36	16	8	12	42	32	+10	40	Qualification for the UEFA Cup first round
4	Hibernian	36	15	7	14	51	43	+8	37	Qualification for the UEFA Cup first round
5	Celtic	36	15	6	15	63	54	+9	36	

Source: Statto
Rules for classification: 1) points; 2) goal difference; 3) number of goals scored.
(C) Champions

== See also ==
- 1977–78 in Scottish football
