= 1979–80 Dundee United F.C. season =

Dundee United
1979–80 season
- Manager: Jim McLean
- Stadium: Tannadice Park
- Scottish Premier Division: 3rd W12 D13 L11 F43 A30 P37
- Scottish Cup: 4th round
- League Cup: Winners
- UEFA Cup: 2nd round
- Drybrough Cup: Semi-final

The 1979–80 season was the 71st year of football played by Dundee United, and covers the period from 1 July 1979 to 30 June 1980. United finished in third place, securing UEFA Cup football for the following season.

== Match results ==
Dundee United played a total of 53 competitive matches during the 1979–80 season.

=== Legend ===
Win
Draw
Loss

All results are written with Dundee United's score first. Own goals in italics

=== Premier Division ===
Date	Opponent	Venue	Result	Attendance	Scorers
11 August 1979	Dundee	H	3–0	17,968	Sturrock, Kirkwood, Stark
18 August 1979	Kilmarnock	A	0–1	5,882	
25 August 1979	Aberdeen	H	1–3	10,982	Sturrock
8 September 1979	Celtic	A	2–2	25,959	Pettigrew (penalty), Milne
15 September 1979	St Mirren	A	2–3	6,276	Pettigrew (2)
22 September 1979	Partick Thistle	H	2–1	6,786	Pettigrew, Kopel
29 September 1979	Greenock Morton	A	1–4	6,558	Pettigrew
6 October 1979	Rangers	H	0–0	19,464	
13 October 1979	Hibernian	H	2–0	7,487	Pettigrew, Milne
20 October 1979	Dundee	A	0–1	16,305	
27 October 1979	Kilmarnock	H	4–0	6,403	Fleming (2), Pettigrew, Kirkwood
3 November 1979	Aberdeen	A	3–0	13,432	Pettigrew, Phillip, Bannon
10 November 1979	Celtic	H	0–1	18,630	
17 November 1979	St Mirren	H	0–0	6,281	
28 November 1979	Partick Thistle	A	1–1	2,830	Sturrock
15 December 1979	Rangers	A	1–2	18,934	Dodds
22 December 1979	Dundee	H	2–0	15,431	Holt, Pettigrew
29 December 1979	Kilmarnock	A	0–0	4,515	
5 January 1980	Celtic	A	0–1	23,822	
12 January 1980	St Mirren	A	1–2	8,355	Narey
23 February 1980	Hibernian	H	1–0	7,822	Pettigrew
1 March 1980	Dundee	A	1–1	15,116	Sturrock
8 March 1980	Kilmarnock	H	0–0	6,497	
12 March 1980	Partick Thistle	H	0–0	6,154	
15 March 1980	Aberdeen	A	1–2	7,836	Kirkwood
19 March 1980	Rangers	H	0–0	9,533	
29 March 1980	St Mirren	H	0–0	6,292	
2 April 1980	Hibernian	A	2–0	5,919	Dodds, Pettigrew
5 April 1980	Partick Thistle	A	2–2	3,354	Dodds, Holt
8 April 1980	Celtic	H	3–0	14,616	Dodds (2), Holt
12 April 1980	Greenock Morton	H	2–0	6,467	
19 April 1980	Hibernian	A	2–0	4,921	Pettigrew, Bannon (penalty)
23 April 1980	Greenock Morton	H	2–0	4,687	Dodds, Bannon (penalty)
26 April 1980	Rangers	A	1–2	16,343	Pettigrew
28 April 1980	Aberdeen	H	1–1	12,764	Holt
1 May 1980	Greenock Morton	A	0–0	2,614	

=== Scottish Cup ===
Date	Rd	Opponent	Venue	Result	Attendance	Scorers
30 January 1980	R3	Dundee	H	5–1	18,064	Pettigrew (4 including 1 penalty), Sturrock
16 February 1980	R4	Rangers	A	0–1	29,000	

=== League Cup ===
Date	Rd	Opponent	Venue	Result	Attendance	Scorers
29 August 1979	R2 1	Airdrieonians	A	1–2	2,570	Addison
1 September 1979	R2 2	Airdrieonians	H	2–0	5,760	Sturrock, Payne
26 September 1979	R3 1	Queen's Park	A	3–0	939	Pettigrew, Dodds, Sturrock
10 October 1979	R3 2	Queen's Park	H	2–1	3,395	Sturrock (penalty), Dodds
31 October 1979	QF 1	Raith Rovers	H	0–0	7,426	
14 November 1979	QF 2	Raith Rovers	A	1–0	6,838	Hegarty
24 November 1979	SF	Hamilton Academical	N	6–2	7,974	Sturrock (2), Kirkwood (2), Pettigrew, Hegarty
8 December 1979	F	Aberdeen	N	0–0	27,156	
12 December 1979	F R	Aberdeen	N	3–0	28,984	Pettigrew (2), Sturrock

=== UEFA Cup ===
Date	Rd	Opponent	Venue	Result	Attendance	Scorers
19 September 1979	R1 1	(Belgium) R.S.C. Anderlecht	H	0–0	12,282	
2 October 1979	R1 2	(Belgium) R.S.C. Anderlecht	Émile Versé Stadium A	1–1	25,000	Kopel
24 October 1979	R2 1	(Hungary) Diosgyori VTK	H	0–1	10,500	
7 November 1979	R2 2	(Hungary) Diosgyori VTK	A	1–3	27,000	Kopel

=== Drybrough Cup ===
Date	Rd	Opponent	Venue	Result	Attendance	Scorers
28 July 1979	QF	Dunfermline Athletic	H	3–0	4,480	Kopel, Sturrock, Milne
1 August 1979	SF	Celtic	N	2–3	21,000	Stewart (penalty), Payne

== League table ==
Pos	Team	Pld	W	D	L	GF	GA	GD	Pts	Qualification or relegation
2	Celtic	36	18	11	7	61	38	+23	47	Qualification for the Cup Winners' Cup first round
3	St Mirren	36	15	12	9	56	49	+7	42	Qualification for the UEFA Cup first round
4	Dundee United	36	12	13	11	43	30	+13	37	Qualification for the UEFA Cup first round
5	Rangers	36	15	7	14	50	46	+4	37	
6	Morton	36	14	8	14	51	46	+5	36	

Source: Statto and RSSSF
Rules for classification: 1) points; 2) goal difference; 3) number of goals scored.

== See also ==
- 1979–80 in Scottish football
