= 1978–79 Dundee United F.C. season =

Dundee United
1978–79 season
- Manager: Jim McLean
- Stadium: Tannadice Park
- Scottish Premier Division: 3rd (UEFA Cup); W12 D13 L11 F43 A30 P37
- Scottish Cup: 3rd Round
- League Cup: 2nd Round
- UEFA Cup: 1st Round

The 1978–79 season was the 70th year of football played by Dundee United, and covers the period from 1 July 1978 to 30 June 1979. United finished in third place, securing UEFA Cup football for the following season.

== Match results ==
Dundee United played a total of 41 competitive matches during the 1978–79 season.

=== Legend ===
Win
Draw
Loss

All results are written with Dundee United's score first. Own goals in italics

=== Premier Division ===
Date	Opponent	Venue	Result	Attendance	Scorers
12 August 1978	Hibernian	H	0–0	5,876	
19 August 1978	Partick Thistle	A	1–1	3,752	Frye
26 August 1978	Aberdeen	H	1–1	10,092	Hegarty
9 September 1978	Greenock Morton	H	1–2	5,531	Hegarty
16 September 1978	Motherwell	A	1–0	3,372	Dodds
23 September 1978	St Mirren	A	3–1	7,544	Dodds, Narey, Kirkwood
30 September 1978	Heart of Midlothain	A	3–1	6,312	Kirkwood (2), Kopel
7 October 1978	Rangers	A	1–1	26,040	Kirkwood
14 October 1978	Celtic	H	1–0	17,726	Kopel
21 October 1978	Hibernian	A	1–1	8,290	Payne
28 October 1978	Partick Thistle	H	2–0	6,055	Dodds, Narey
4 November 1978	Aberdeen	A	0–1	14,692	
11 November 1978	Greenock Morton	A	1–3	6,298	Addison
18 November 1978	Motherwell	H	2–1	5,876	Stewart, Kirkwood
25 November 1978	St Mirren	H	1–1	6,896	Kirkwood
9 December 1978	Rangers	H	3–0	15,247	Dodds, Fleming, Narey (penalty)
16 December 1978	Celtic	A	1–1	19,868	Narey
23 December 1978	Hibernian	H	2–1	7,194	McNamara, Payne
20 January 1979	St Mirren	A	1–2	6,341	Sturrock
10 February 1979	Rangers	A	0–1	26,077	
3 March 1979	Hibernian	A	0–1	5,045	
7 March 1979	Motherwell	A	4–0	2,643	Sturrock (2), Narey, Stewart (penalty)
10 March 1979	Greenock Morton	H	4–1	6,033	Sturrock (2), Stark, Kirkwood
14 March 1979	Partick Thistle	H	2–1	6,201	Holt, Hegarty
17 March 1979	Aberdeen	A	2–0	11,181	Sturrock, Fleming
24 March 1979	Greenock Morton	A	1–3	5,357	Dodds
28 March 1979	Partick Thistle	A	2–1	3,123	Kirkwood, Fleming
31 March 1979	Motherwell	H	2–1	5,675	Addison
4 April 1979	Heart of Midlothian	A	0–2	6,480	
7 April 1979	St Mirren	H	2–0	6,608	Hegarty, Kirkwood
11 April 1979	Celtic	H	2–1	14,424	Holt, Dodds
14 April 1979	Heart of Midlothian	A	3–0	7,564	Dodds (2), Kirkwood
21 April 1979	Rangers	H	1–2	24,264	Stewart (penalty)
25 April 1979	Heart of Midlothian	H	2–1	6,005	Dodds, Kirkwood
28 April 1979	Celtic	A	1–2	35,807	Dodds
5 May 1979	Aberdeen	H	2–2	7,822	Payne, Stewart

=== Scottish Cup ===
Date	Rd	Opponent	Venue	Result	Attendance	Scorers
26 February 1979	R3	St Mirren	H	0–2	18,064	

=== League Cup ===
Date	Rd	Opponent	Venue	Result	Attendance	Scorers
30 August 1978	R2 1	Celtic	H	2–3	2,570	Fleming, Sturrock
2 September 1978	R2 2	Celtic	A	0–1	5,760	

=== UEFA Cup ===
Date	Rd	Opponent	Venue	Result	Attendance	Scorers
12 September 1978	R1 1	(Belgium) Standard Liège	A	0–1	12,282	
27 September 1978	R1 2	(Belgium) Standard Liège	H	0–0	25,000	

== League table ==
Pos	Team	Pld	W	D	L	GF	GA	GD	Pts	Qualification or relegation
1	Celtic (C)	36	21	6	9	61	37	+24	48	Qualification for the European Cup first round
2	Rangers	36	18	9	9	52	35	+17	45	Qualification for the Cup Winners' Cup first round
3	Dundee United	36	18	8	10	56	37	+19	44	Qualification for the UEFA Cup first round
4	Aberdeen	36	13	14	9	59	36	+23	40	Qualification for the UEFA Cup first round
5	Hibernian	36	12	13	11	44	48	−4	37	

Source: Statto and RSSSF
Rules for classification: 1) points; 2) goal difference; 3) number of goals scored.
(C) Champions

== See also ==
- 1978–79 in Scottish football
