= 1985–86 Dundee United F.C. season =

Dundee United
1985–86 season
- Chairman: George Fox
- Manager: Jim McLean
- Stadium: Tannadice Park
- Premier Division: Third place
- Scottish Cup: Semi-finals
- League Cup: Semi-finals
- UEFA Cup: Third round
- Top goalscorer: League: Eamonn Bannon (11); All: Eamonn Bannon (15)
- Highest home attendance: 19,878 vs. Heart of Midlothian, Premier Division, 12 April 1986
- Lowest home attendance: 4,986 vs. St Mirren, Premier Division, 26 April 1986
Home colours	Away colours

The 1985–86 season was the 77th year of football played by Dundee United, and covers the period from 1 July 1985 to 30 June 1986. United finished in third place, securing UEFA Cup football for the following season.

== Summary ==
Dundee United played a total of 52 competitive matches during the 1985–86 season. The team finished third in the Scottish Premier Division.

In the cup competitions, United lost in the semi-final of the Scottish Cup to Heart of Midlothian and to Aberdeen in the same round of the Scottish League Cup. Swiss side Neuchâtel Xamax eliminated United in the third round of the UEFA Cup.

The club signed one player during the season with a total public cost of £70,000. Two other players joined before the following season.Three players were sold by the club during the season.

The clubs playing kits were sponsored by future chairman Eddie Thompson's VG Foodstores.

Undersoil heating was used for the first time on 27 November 1985 in the UEFA Cup match against Neuchâtel Xamax

== Results and fixtures ==
All results are written with Dundee United's score first.

=== Scottish Premier Division ===
Date	Opponent	Venue	Result	Attendance	Scorers
10 August 1985	Rangers	A	0–1	28,870	
17 August 1985	Aberdeen	H	1–1	14,339	Sturrock
24 August 1985	Dundee	H	2–0	13,736	Beedie, Sturrock
31 August 1985	Motherwell	A	1–0	3,327	Clark
7 September 1985	Clydebank	H	2–1	5,336	Sturrock, Milne
14 September 1985	Heart of Midlothian	A	0–2	7,617	
28 September 1985	St Mirren	A	0–1	4,408	
5 October 1985	Hibernian	H	2–2	6,951	Malpas (2)
12 October 1985	Rangers	H	1–1	16,657	Dodds
19 October 1985	Aberdeen	A	2–3	15,748	Sturrock, Redford
26 October 1985	Celtic	A	3–0	25,976	Dodds, Bannon (2)
2 November 1985	Heart of Midlothian	H	1–1	10,142	Gough
9 November 1985	Motherwell	H	3–0	5,493	Hegarty, Gough, Dodds
16 November 1985	Dundee	A	3–0	11,736	Hegarty (2), Kirkwood
23 November 1985	Clydebank	A	2–1	1,839	Milne, Dodds
14 December 1985	Rangers	A	1–1	16,657	Dodds
21 December 1985	Aberdeen	H	2–1	9,990	Bannon, Sturrock
23 December 1985	Celtic	H	1–0	15,894	Bannon
28 December 1985	Dundee	H	0–0	14,869	
4 January 1986	Celtic	H	4–2	16,668	Dodds (2), Bannon, Gallacher
11 January 1986	Heart of Midlothian	A	1–1	19,043	Bannon
18 January 1986	Clydebank	H	4–0	6,214	Bannon, Dodds, Hegarty, Redford
1 February 1986	St Mirren	A	1–1	4,221	Hegarty
8 February 1986	Hibernian	H	4–0	8,504	Bannon, Coyne (2), Gallacher
22 February 1986	Rangers	H	1–1	14,644	Dodds
26 February 1986	Hibernian	A	1–0	7,137	Bannon
11 March 1986	Motherwell	A	0–2	2,823	
15 March 1986	Celtic	A	1–1	20,965	Dodds
22 March 1986	Motherwell	H	4–0	5,710	Sturrock (2), Bannon, Dodds
29 March 1986	Dundee	A	1–0	15,079	Gough
8 April 1986	St Mirren	H	5–0	6,347	Sturrock, Dodds (2), Galaacher, Gough
12 April 1986	Heart of Midlothian	H	0–3	19,878	
16 April 1986	Aberdeen	A	1–0	7,278	Gough
19 April 1986	Clydebank	A	1–1	1,534	Redford
26 April 1986	St Mirren	H	1–2	4,986	Redford
3 May 1986	Hibernian	A	2–1	3,513	Fulton, Beedie

=== Scottish Cup ===
Date	Rd	Opponent	Venue	Result	Attendance	Scorers
25 January 1986	Third round	Greenock Morton	H	4–0	6,938	Coyne (2), Redford, Bannon (penalty)
15 February 1986	Fourth round	Kilmarnock	H	1–1	6,610	Sturrock
19 February 1986	Fourth round replay	Kilmarnock	A	1–0	9,054	Sturrock
8 March 1986	Quarter-finals	Motherwell	A	1–0	6,822	Gough
5 April 1986	Semi-finals	Heart of Midlothian	N	0–1	30,872	

=== Scottish League Cup ===
Date	Rd	Opponent	Venue	Result	Attendance	Scorers
21 August 1985	Second round	Alloa Athletic	A	2–0	2,010	Bannon, Gough
28 August 1985	Third round	Clydebank	H	2–0	5,870	Gough, Redford
4 September 1985	Fourth round	St Mirren	H	2–1	7,682	Milne (2)
25 September 1985	Semi-finals 1st leg	Aberdeen	A	0–1	12,585	
9 October 1985	Semi-finals 2nd leg	Aberdeen	H	0–1	20,119	

=== UEFA Cup ===
Date	Rd	Opponent	Venue	Result	Attendance	Scorers
18 September 1985	First round 1st leg	(Republic of Ireland) Bohemians	A	5–2	4,185	Sturrock (3), Bannon (2)
2 October 1985	First round 2nd leg	(Republic of Ireland) Bohemians	H	2–2	7,550	Milne, Redford
23 October 1985	Second round 1st leg	(Socialist Federal Republic of Yugoslavia) Vardar	H	2–0	9,129	Redford, Gough
6 November 1985	Second round 2nd leg	(Socialist Federal Republic of Yugoslavia) Vardar	A	1–1	30,000	Hegarty
26 November 1985	Third round 1st leg	(Switzerland) Neuchâtel Xamax	H	2–1	10,663	Dodds, Redford
10 December 1985	Third round 2nd leg	(Switzerland) Neuchâtel Xamax	A	1–3	21,821	Bannon

== Competitions ==
=== League table ===
Pos	Team	Pld	W	D	L	GF	GA	GD	Pts	Qualification
1	Celtic (C)	36	20	10	6	67	38	+29	50	Qualification for the European Cup first round
2	Heart of Midlothian	36	20	10	6	59	33	+26	50	Qualification for the UEFA Cup first round
3	Dundee United	36	18	11	7	59	31	+28	47	Qualification for the UEFA Cup first round
4	Aberdeen	36	16	12	8	62	31	+31	44	Qualification for the Cup Winners' Cup first round
5	Rangers	36	13	9	14	53	45	+8	35	Qualification for the UEFA Cup first round

Source: Rsssf
Rules for classification: 1) points; 2) goal difference; 3) number of goals scored.
(C) Champions

== Transfers ==
=== In ===
Date	Player	From	Fee
15 August 1985	(Scotland) Ian Redford	(Scotland) Rangers	£70,000
16 May 1986	(Scotland) Dave Bowman	(England) Coventry City	£140,000*
16 May 1986	(Scotland) Jim McInally	(England) Coventry City	£140,000*

=== Out ===
Date	Player	To	Fee
11 April 1986	(Scotland) Hamish McAlpine	(Scotland) Raith Rovers	Free
May 1986	(Scotland) Stuart Beedie	(Scotland) Hibernian	Unknown
May 1986	(Scotland) Billy Kirkwood	(Scotland) Hibernian	Unknown

=== Loans out ===
Player	To
(Scotland) Scott Thomson	(Scotland) Raith Rovers

== See also ==
- 1985–86 in Scottish football
