= Ralph Milne =

Scottish footballer

Personal information
- Full name: Ralph Milne
- Date of birth: 13 May 1961
- Place of birth: Dundee, Scotland
- Date of death: 6 September 2015 (aged 54)
- Place of death: Dundee, Scotland
- Height: 5 ft 7 in (1.70 m)
- Position: Midfielder

Youth career
- 1970–1976: Dundee Celtic Boys Club

Senior career*
Years	Team	Apps	(Gls)
1976–1987	Dundee United	179	(45)
1987–1988	Charlton Athletic	22	(0)
1988	Bristol City	30	(6)
1988–1991	Manchester United	23	(3)
1990	→ West Ham United (loan)	0	(0)
1991–1992	Sing Tao		
Total		254	(54)

International career
1981–1983	Scotland U21	3	(0)
- * Club domestic league appearances and goals

Ralph Milne (13 May 1961 – 6 September 2015) was a Scottish professional footballer whose clubs included Dundee United, Charlton Athletic, Bristol City and Manchester United. He played as both an attacking midfielder or a winger.

He began his career at Dundee United, helping the club to be crowned Premier Division champions in 1982–83, and playing in Scottish Cup and League Cup final defeats. In recognition of his contribution to the most successful period in the club's history, Milne has been inducted into the Dundee United Hall of Fame alongside several of his former teammates. He made a total of 285 appearances for Dundee United in major competitions and is the club's all-time top scorer in Europe (UEFA Cup and European Cup) with a tally of 15 goals. Milne is often considered to be among the best Scottish footballers not to win a full senior cap.

Hampered by his heavy drinking, he hit his peak at an early age and, after an unsuccessful spell at English club Charlton Athletic from January 1987, ended the 1987–88 season with Third Division club Bristol City. He returned to the First Division after being signed by Alex Ferguson at Manchester United in November 1988 for a £170,000 fee but failed to restart his career. Barring a brief spell in Hong Kong with Sing Tao, Milne played his last first-team game as a professional at the age of 28.

== Club career ==
Ralph Milne was born in Dundee, the youngest of four siblings, on 13 May 1961. He was moved forward a year in primary school due to his remarkable academic progress. He began his football career as a youth with Dundee Celtic Boys Club, where he played initially as a striker and had a prolific goalscoring record.

=== Dundee United ===
==== Immediate success ====
Milne signed for Dundee United in January 1976 and, after a couple of seasons in the reserves, began to feature for the first team during the 1979–80 campaign. He scored his first goal at the age of 18 during his full debut appearance on 28 July 1979, United's third goal in a 3–0 win over Dunfermline Athletic in a Drybrough Cup tie. Milne scored his first Premier Division goal on 8 September in a 2–2 draw away against Celtic, netting the equaliser with a long-range shot. By the end of his debut season, Milne had played 20 games, eight of which he was in the starting line-up for, and scored three goals. He was named as the club's Reserve Player of the Year and picked up a 1979 Scottish League Cup Final winners medal despite not being named in the matchday squad.

The 1980–81 season saw Milne become a regular in the Dundee United team, scoring 10 goals in 33 appearances. United retained the League Cup, though Milne did not feature in the final victory over their Dundee derby rivals at Dens Park. He finished the season playing in the 1981 Scottish Cup Final side, which ended in a 4–1 defeat to Rangers after a replay. Milne was now being described by manager Jim McLean as "potentially... the most exciting player in Scotland", describing Milne as a "winger with pace who can score goals". McLean, however, expressed reservations about Milne's overall attitude and ability to play through patches of poor form.

Dundee United reached another final in the 1981–82 season, and Milne scored the opening goal in the 1981 Scottish League Cup Final on 28 November 1981, latching onto a pass from Paul Sturrock and striking a low powerful shot past the Rangers goalkeeper; however Rangers went on to controversially win 2–1 after another goal for Dundee United, "scored" by Sturrock, had been disallowed for offside. Milne also impressed in Europe that season, scoring against AS Monaco, Borussia Mönchengladbach and Winterslag (twice) in the UEFA Cup.

==== League title and European Cup campaign ====
The 1982–83 season was a seminal year for both Dundee United and 21-year-old Milne. The club won the league for the first time, finishing one point ahead of Celtic and "New Firm rivals" Aberdeen in a tightly fought league campaign. Milne's 16 goals in the league, playing wide right, were a significant contribution to United's league win. One of the most high profile of these goals was on 20 April when he scored the winning goal in a 3–2 win over Celtic at Parkhead; he controlled an Eamonn Bannon cross from the right on his chest and volleyed the ball from 20 yards out past Celtic goalkeeper Packie Bonner.

On the last day of the season, 14 May 1983, Dundee United needed a win to guarantee the league title. The day after his 22nd birthday, Milne opened the scoring against local rivals Dundee with a skilfully executed long-distance chipped shot; the match finished 2–1 to United. Milne achieved his peak goal tally in his career that season, scoring 21 goals in all competitions. Having turned 22 the day before the game, the goal against Dundee was to be the defining moment of his career.

Dundee United's league success saw them take part in the European Cup in 1983–84. Milne scored doubles against Hamrun Spartans and Standard Liège as United reached the semi-final, losing 3–2 on aggregate to Roma in an ill-tempered tie. Dundee United also failed to retain their league title, finishing in third place and 10 points behind champions Aberdeen. Milne's goal tally also dropped significantly from the previous year, down to five goals in the league and a total of 12 in all competitions.

==== Discipline problems and decline ====
Milne was with Dundee United for a further three seasons and still a regular player, although he scored less frequently. Milne's increasingly fractious relationship with manager Jim McLean was also becoming common knowledge; in December 1983, McLean publicly criticised Milne, stating: "I have tried to get the message across to him that it is when he is not playing well that he needs to work hardest. It is plainly not sinking in."

In August 1984, Milne scored both goals against Nottingham Forest in a pre-season testimonial match for McLean. However, after the game, the pair again fell out because of a brief conversation Milne had with Brian Clough which led McLean to believe the player was trying to arrange a deal away from United; by this time Milne had grown increasingly frustrated over being frequently fined a week's wages for breaking minor club rules and generally offending McLean's strict sense of discipline. The financial strain this caused led to him to work as a casual labourer to meet his mortgage repayments. By this time, his drinking had become more of a problem, resulting in a struggle to maintain fitness.

Milne featured in a further two Cup finals for United, losing 1–0 to Rangers in October 1984 in the Scottish League Cup Final and losing 2–1 to Celtic in May 1985 in the Scottish Cup Final. He aggravated a hamstring injury in the final against Rangers and was out of action for three months. In 1986–87, he played in the first three rounds of the UEFA Cup run (scoring once, against RC Lens in the first round) which eventually saw the team beat Barcelona and Borussia Mönchengladbach on their way to the final. However, Milne had left in January 1987 before these high-profile games took place, sold to Charlton Athletic, having lost his place in the side to the up-and-coming Kevin Gallacher. Milne made a total of 285 appearances for Dundee United in major competitions and is the club's all-time top scorer in Europe (UEFA Cup and European Cup) with a tally of 15 goals.

=== Charlton Athletic ===
He was sold to English First Division club Charlton Athletic in January 1987 for a fee of £125,000. He played at Wembley Stadium in the final of the Full Members Cup on 29 March, which ended in a 1–0 defeat to Blackburn Rovers. Charlton finished the 1986–87 season in the relegation play-off place, but retained their top-flight status after beating Leeds United 2–1 in a replay in the play-off final, following a 1–1 aggregate draw. Milne only played as a late substitute in the first leg at Selhurst Park and ended the game with a broken jaw after being elbowed by Micky Adams. He dropped out of manager Lennie Lawrence's first team plans during the 1987–88 season, and was allowed to leave the club.

=== Bristol City ===
Milne dropped down two divisions to join Bristol City for a £50,000 fee in January 1988. City ended the 1987–88 campaign in the play-offs, but failed to gain promotion after losing 4–0 to Walsall in a replay of the play-off final.

After a full pre-season, he started to play well and hit six goals in 30 Third Division games during his time at Ashton Gate. Milne's form attracted attention elsewhere, with Aberdeen among those interested, and a move Milne favoured to be near his son and other family in Scotland. On being called into a meeting with manager, Joe Jordan, Milne was told by Jordan that he had no intention of letting him nor any of his other best players leave, but that he would make an exception for Manchester United.

=== Manchester United ===
Milne's form at Bristol City was enough to convince Manchester United manager Alex Ferguson that he was still worth a contract with a top-flight club. In November 1988, he moved to Old Trafford in a £170,000 deal. Ferguson was looking to build a title-winning side two years after joining United but had seen his side finish second in the league the previous season, and now they were on a winless run in the league that saw them mid-table. Ferguson selected Milne on the left wing as Gordon Strachan was already established on the right wing.

Milne managed three goals in 22 league appearances in 1988–89. The first was a 20-yard volley on 3 December 1988 in a 3–0 home win over former club Charlton Athletic, which ended United's nine-match winless run (eight draws and a defeat) in the First Division. He also scored on Boxing Day in a 2–0 win over Nottingham Forest at Old Trafford. The following week, Milne played what he felt was his best game in a Manchester United jersey in a 3–1 New Year's victory over rivals Liverpool. However, they were unable to maintain their form and finished 11th in the league after winning only three of their last 14 league games. Milne scored his third and final United goal on 25 March 1989 in a 2–0 home win over Luton Town, once again in the league.

In September 1989, Ferguson signed left-winger Danny Wallace from Southampton. Wallace was not a particularly successful buy for United, and was soon himself struggling to hold down a place in the first team, but the progression of Lee Sharpe meant that Milne was forced out of the first team picture at Old Trafford in 1989–90, making one substitute appearance in the league. During that season, as United struggled in the league but won the FA Cup, Milne was loaned out to Lou Macari's West Ham United, where he made the final appearance of his career in a League Cup tie on 24 January 1990 away to Derby County at the age of 28. His season was ended shortly afterwards after he picked up groin injury that required surgery. Despite being given a new one-year contract he began missing reserve team games during the 1990–91 season and instead spent his time drinking.

Despite his low transfer fee, Milne has been described as Ferguson's and even as Manchester United's worst signing. Ferguson defended the signing by pointing out Milne's contribution to the development of Lee Sharpe, who was playing left-back at the time. Ferguson remarked that Milne helped Sharpe by both dropping back to protect Sharpe and by giving him positional advice. Milne remained on United's payroll until 30 June 1991, when he was released.

"You know what it's like? It's like being a kid watching a movie, and it's a sad ending. And you start crying. If it makes a huge impression when United want to sign you, it makes a huge one when they want to get rid of you. Bang, the door's closed. You're finished."

— Milne was revitalised when United approached him, but his failure at Old Trafford mentally drained him.

=== Sing Tao ===
Milne had unsuccessful trials with Turkish club MKE Ankaragücü and Danish side Esbjerg fB in 1991. Later in the year he travelled to Hong Kong to play for Sing Tao SC. He spent a year there, helping the club to finish fourth in the First Division in 1991–92, before he rejected the offer of a new contract and instead returned to Britain. He had a trial spell at Derry City before quitting football at the age of 32.

== International career ==
Milne made his debut for the Scotland under-21 side on 8 September 1981 at the age of 20, when he on came as a substitute for Alan Brazil during a 4–0 win over Sweden in Edinburgh. He made a further two appearances for the under-21 side as an overage player in the autumn of 1983, playing against Belgium (0–0 at Dundee) and East Germany (1–1 at Jena, East Germany). He was never capped for the senior team, and has been cited as one of the best Scottish footballers not to win a full senior cap. According to Milne himself the Scotland manager Jock Stein intended to take him on a warm-up tour to the United States, but was told not to by Jim McLean, for which Milne never forgave him.

== Style of play ==
Milne was naturally right-footed, though he trained hard with his left foot as a boy to become equally skilled with both feet. Former Dundee United teammate Paul Hegarty stated that Milne possessed great pace, as well as bravery, a good work ethic, and an ability to score important goals. Another former Dundee United teammate, Davie Dodds, said that Milne was as good a finisher as any player in Scottish football during the 1980s.

Jim McLean, Milne's manager at Dundee United, summed up Milne's career and footballing ability when writing his autobiography:

"If I had an outstanding failure then it was Ralph Milne. He should have been playing in World Cups. He should have won a bundle of Scotland international honours. It was a tragedy that that boy was not playing for his country all the time. He had tremendous talent – and I failed with him. He did not have the right attitude to the game and I could not instil that into him."

== Personal life ==
He married Kim from 1985 to 1988, and the couple had a son, Bradley. He also had a son, Robert, with new partner Lee in 1990. The relationship with Lee ended after ten years. In 2005, he began a relationship with Fiona Spence, 19 years his junior, who stayed with Milne for over eight years despite admitting that Milne regularly beat her.

Milne had admitted to problems with alcoholism and problem gambling during and after his playing career. He was always an enthusiastic drinker throughout his career, but he lost his passion for football after picking up an injury in 1990 and began drinking in a way which began to severely damage his health. After retiring as a player he worked at a pub in Nailsea. He appeared in court in 2010 and 2013, but was never convicted, for allegedly attacking his partner Fiona Spence whilst highly intoxicated. Milne's manager at Dundee United, Jim McLean, has since stated that Milne would have had greater success in his career were it not for his problems with alcohol and discipline. Milne died on 6 September 2015, at the age of 54, due to complications from liver problems.

== Career statistics ==
Appearances and goals by club, season and competition
Club	Season	League			National cup (Note: Includes Scottish Cup)		League cup (Note: Includes Scottish League Cup, Football League Cup)		Europe		Total	
Club	Season	Division	Apps	Goals	Apps	Goals	Apps	Goals	Apps	Goals	Apps	Goals
Dundee United	1979–80	Scottish Premier Division	13	2	0	0	4	0	2 (Note: Appearance(s) in UEFA Cup)	0	19	2
Dundee United	1980–81	Scottish Premier Division	21	7	6	0	5	3	1	0	33	10
Dundee United	1981–82	Scottish Premier Division	35	8	4	0	8	2	8	4	55	14
Dundee United	1982–83	Scottish Premier Division	34	16	1	0	6	2	8	3	49	21
Dundee United	1983–84	Scottish Premier Division	25	5	4	0	10	3	8 (Note: Appearances in European Cup)	4	47	12
Dundee United	1984–85	Scottish Premier Division	19	4	5	0	5	2	2	2	31	8
Dundee United	1985–86	Scottish Premier Division	18	2	2	0	3	2	6	1	29	5
Dundee United	1986–87	Scottish Premier Division	14	1	0	0	2	0	6	1	22	2
Dundee United	Total		179	45	22	0	43	14	41	15	285	74
Charlton Athletic	1986–87	First Division	12	0	—		—		—		12	0
Charlton Athletic	1987–88	First Division	10	0	—		—		—		10	0
Charlton Athletic	Total		22	0	—		—		—		22	0
Bristol City	1987–88	Third Division	19	4	—		—		—		19	4
Bristol City	1988–89	Third Division	11	2	—		—		—		11	2
Bristol City	Total		30	6	—		—		—		30	6
Manchester United	1988–89	First Division	22	3	7	0	0	0	—		29	3
Manchester United	1989–90	First Division	1	0	0	0	0	0	—		1	0
Manchester United	1990–91	First Division	0	0	0	0	0	0	0	0	0	0
Manchester United	Total		23	3	7	0	0	0	0	0	30	3
West Ham United (loan)	1989–90	Second Division	0	0	0	0	1	0	—		1	0
Career total			254	54	29	0	44	14	41	15	368	83

== Honours ==
Dundee United

- Scottish Football League Premier Division: 1982–83
- Scottish League Cup: 1979–80

Charlton Athletic

- Football League Second Division play-offs: 1987
- Full Members' Cup runner-up: 1986–87

Individual

- Dundee United Hall of Fame (inducted 2009)
