= Eamonn Bannon =

Scottish footballer and manager

Personal information
- Full name: Eamonn John Bannon
- Date of birth: 18 April 1958 (age 68)
- Place of birth: Edinburgh, Scotland
- Height: 5 ft 9 in (1.75 m)
- Position: Midfielder

Senior career*
Years	Team	Apps	(Gls)
1976–1979	Heart of Midlothian	71	(19)
1979	Chelsea	25	(1)
1979–1988	Dundee United	290	(72)
1988–1993	Heart of Midlothian	114	(9)
1993–1994	Hibernian	1	(0)
1995–1996	Stenhousemuir	29	(1)
1997–1999	Spartans		

International career
1978–1980	Scotland U21	7	(1)
1978	Scottish League XI	1	(0)
1979–1986	Scotland	11	(1)

Managerial career
- 1996: Falkirk
- * Club domestic league appearances and goals

Eamonn John Bannon (born 18 April 1958) is a Scottish former international footballer who played in midfield. His most successful seasons were with Dundee United where he won two league cups and the 1983 League Championship. Numerous runs with United in European football included playing in the 1983–84 European Cup semi final and the 1987 UEFA Cup Final.

He began his career at Hearts in the mid-1970s before having a brief spell at Chelsea. He rejoined Hearts in 1988, where he remained for a further five years. He also managed Falkirk for a few months in 1996.

Bannon gained 11 Scotland caps and played at the 1986 FIFA World Cup in Mexico.

== Career ==
=== Hearts ===
Bannon began his career with Hearts, and made his début for the club against Ayr United during season 1976–77. The young midfielder impressed with his skilful play but was unable to save Hearts from relegation. Former Scotland manager Willie Ormond took over as manager the following season, and with little money available to rebuild the side he relied heavily on Bannon. Bannon repaid Ormond's faith in him by scoring thirteen goals in the Scottish First Division, including a hat-trick against Kilmarnock in December 1977. Hearts duly secured promotion back to the Scottish Premier Division at the end of the season. In 1979 Hearts sold Bannon to Chelsea for £220,000, with the transfer fee paying a £200,000 debt which their bank were threatening to foreclose on. In this first spell at Hearts, he made a total of 71 league appearances and scored 19 goals.

=== Chelsea ===
Chelsea bought Bannon in February 1979 to replace the departing Ray Wilkins and he soon found himself a first team regular. Bannon was seen as Chelsea's playmaker by manager Danny Blanchflower. He impressed with his clever play and passing ability, and became popular with the fans. Bannon scored his first, and only, goal for Chelsea in his third game, a match away at Bolton Wanderers. Despite making a good impact, Bannon was unable to save Chelsea from relegation at the end of the season. Chelsea made a strong start to the 1979–80 campaign, but two consecutive league defeats and an early exit in the League Cup saw manager Danny Blanchflower sacked and replaced by Geoff Hurst. Although initially selected by Hurst, Bannon gradually slipped down the order at Chelsea and was sold in October 1979 to Dundee United for £165,000.

=== Dundee United ===
Bannon's £165,000 transfer to Dundee United in October 1979 was a Scottish transfer record at the time. He made his début for United on 31 October 1979 in a 0–0 draw against Raith Rovers in the Scottish League Cup. He made his league debut three days later away at Aberdeen and scored in a 3–0 win. Bannon quickly established himself as a regular in the Dundee United team, and won his first winners medal in December 1979 when United defeated Aberdeen 3–0 in the League Cup final. He went on to make a total of 31 appearances that season, scoring 4 goals.

The following season saw Bannon miss only two of Dundee United's 36 league fixtures, with him scoring eight goals, including a double in a 4–1 win over Rangers at Ibrox. Dundee United retained the Scottish League Cup, defeating local rivals Dundee by 3–0 in the final on 6 December 1980. Bannon played in all eleven games in the League Cup, scoring four times en route to the final. He also helped United reach the 1981 Scottish Cup Final, again playing in every match and scoring against Celtic in a 3–2 win in the semi-final. United however were beaten 4–1 by Rangers in the final.

Bannon helped United reach a third consecutive Scottish League Cup final in 1981–82, scoring a hat-trick away against Ayr United, but they lost narrowly to Rangers in the final. Dundee United enjoyed their best season to date in Europe, reaching the quarter-finals of the UEFA Cup. En route, Bannon scored two penalties in a 5–2 win away against AS Monaco and the fifth goal in Dundee United's 5–0 win at home against Borussia Mönchengladbach, an outstanding solo goal where he ran from wide left on the half-way line towards goal, before cutting in to shoot past the Borussia goalkeeper.

Season 1982–83 saw Dundee United involved in a tight contest with Celtic and Aberdeen for the Scottish Premier Division title. Bannon proved to be an important player for United, scoring ten league goals. As the season neared its end, Dundee United faced Celtic at Parkhead on 20 April 1983. United took the lead in the first half when Celtic defender Roy Aitken mis-headered a Bannon corner, allowing Paul Hegarty to score. Celtic equalised before half-time but Bannon converted a penalty kick early in the second half to restore United's lead. Celtic again equalised, but on 84 minutes Bannon's cross from the right was volleyed in by Ralph Milne to clinch a 3–2 win. Dundee United went into their final league fixture of the season, against Dundee at Dens Park, still needing a win to guarantee the title. Bannon had a penalty kick saved in the first half but scored from the rebound to put United 2–0 ahead, and despite Dundee pulling a goal back, United held on to win their first ever Scottish league title.

Dundee United's league success saw them take part in the European Cup in 1983–84. United reached the semi-finals, with Bannon scoring once against Ħamrun Spartans in one of the early rounds with a header. United failed to reach the final, losing 3–2 on aggregate to Roma in an ill-tempered tie. Dundee United also failed to retain their league title, finishing in third place and 10 points behind winners Aberdeen.

Dundee United maintained a regular top five placing in succeeding seasons. Bannon remained a key figure in a United side that went on to reach the 1987 UEFA Cup Final and the Scottish Cup 1985, 1987 and 1988. They lost in all of these finals, and the Scottish Cup was the only domestic trophy Bannon failed to win in his career. The 1988 Scottish Cup Final defeat to Celtic was Bannon's last match for Dundee United, as he then returned to Hearts.

=== Hearts ===
Bannon returned to Hearts in June 1988 who bought him for a transfer fee of £225,000, and he spent the next five years there. He didn't win any silverware, but played in the famous 1–0 UEFA Cup win over Bayern Munich at Tynecastle in February 1989 (although they lost the second leg 2–0 in Germany to go out on aggregate). He was also credited with having a positive influence on the younger players breaking through at that time, such as Alan McLaren and Scott Crabbe.

=== Later career ===
At the end of his playing career he had a spell as player-coach with Hibs during season 1993–94, making one solitary appearance in the league in April 1994, playing in central defence. Bannon returned to Hearts in the summer of 1994 for a season as assistant manager under Tommy McLean, before a final playing spell with Stenhousemuir. Now playing as a defender, Bannon helped them win the 1995 Scottish Challenge Cup Final at McDiarmid Park, as they defeated his old club Dundee United on a penalty shootout.

Bannon went on to manage Falkirk for a few months in 1996 before buying a guest house in Edinburgh, which he has run since 1997. Bannon played for Spartans for a couple of years before retiring at the age of 40, although he continued to coach the side. Bannon also does matchday work for the Press Association.

In 2009, Bannon was inducted into Dundee United's Hall of Fame, alongside former teammates such as David Narey, Paul Hegarty and Paul Sturrock.

== International ==
Bannon began his international career in 1978, making his début for the Scotland under-21 team on 17 September at Pittodrie Stadium in a friendly against the USA. He went on to play a total of seven games at Under 21 level between 1978 and 1980, scoring once in a European Championship tie away against Norway in a 2–2 draw.

Bannon made his full international début for Scotland on 19 December 1979 in a European Championship qualifier against Belgium at Hampden Park. Bannon played in the first half, but was replaced at half-time by Davie Provan as Belgium eased to a comfortable 3–1 win. He didn't feature again for Scotland until getting a recall for the 1983 British Home Championship tie against Northern Ireland at Hampden on 24 May 1983. Although the match finished 0–0, Bannon impressed with his pace and crossing of the ball, and was considered one of Scotland's best players on the night. He kept his place in the side for the next British Championship match four days later in Cardiff against Wales, helping Scotland win 2–0. Scotland travelled to Wembley for the last tie against England on 1 June. However, Scotland were outplayed and Bannon failed to match the form he had shown in the previous two games. England ran out comfortable 2–0 winners to clinch the British Championship title. Bannon faded from the international scene after that, but scored what proved to be his only Scotland goal in November 1983 away against East Germany.

In January 1986, with Scotland making preparations for the World Cup in Mexico, Bannon's form at club level saw him selected by Alex Ferguson for his 21-man squad travelling to play Israel for a friendly in Tel Aviv. Bannon was accompanied by four of his Dundee United teammates; Richard Gough, Maurice Malpas, David Narey and Paul Sturrock.

Bannon played in the match for Scotland, his first cap in over two years, which Scotland won 1–0. Back in the Scotland set-up, Bannon was part of the 22-man squad that travelled to Mexico for the World Cup. What transpired to be his final two games for Scotland came as a substitute in the defeat to Denmark and started the next match against West Germany. It was in this game he had an outstanding shot from the edge of the box, forcing an excellent save by German goalkeeper Harald Schumacher. Scotland went on to lose the match 2–1, and Bannon was not included in the squad for the final group match against Uruguay.

His nephew, Paul Telfer, also played for Scotland.

== Career statistics ==
Appearances and goals by club, season and competition
Club	Season	League			National cup (Note: Includes Scottish Cup, FA Cup)		League cup (Note: Includes Scottish League Cup, Football League Cup)		Europe		Total	
Club	Season	Division	Apps	Goals	Apps	Goals	Apps	Goals	Apps	Goals	Apps	Goals
Heart of Midlothian	1976–77	Scottish Premier Division	13	1	5	0	—		1	0	19	1
Heart of Midlothian	1977–78	Scottish First Division	39	13	3	1	7	3	—		49	17
Heart of Midlothian	1978–79	Scottish Premier Division	19	5	—		2	1	—		21	6
Heart of Midlothian	Total		71	19	8	1	9	4	1	0	89	24
Chelsea	1978–79	First Division	19	1	—		—		—		19	1
Chelsea	1979–80	Second Division	6	0	—		2	0	—		8	0
Chelsea	Total		25	1	0	0	2	0	0	0	27	1
Dundee United	1979–80	Scottish Premier Division	24	4	2	0	5	0	—		31	4
Dundee United	1980–81	Scottish Premier Division	34	8	7	1	11	4	3	0	55	13
Dundee United	1981–82	Scottish Premier Division	36	12	5	1	11	5	8	4	60	22
Dundee United	1982–83	Scottish Premier Division	32	10	—		5	3	6	0	43	13
Dundee United	1983–84	Scottish Premier Division	33	7	3	0	9	3	8	1	53	11
Dundee United	1984–85	Scottish Premier Division	35	10	6	3	6	2	6	1	53	16
Dundee United	1985–86	Scottish Premier Division	31	11	5	1	5	1	6	2	47	15
Dundee United	1986–87	Scottish Premier Division	39	9	4	0	4	0	11	0	58	9
Dundee United	1987–88	Scottish Premier Division	26	1	9	4	2	0	3	0	40	5
Dundee United	Total		290	72	41	10	58	18	51	8	440	108
Heart of Midlothian	1988–89	Scottish Premier Division	30	2	3	2	4	0	8	2	45	2
Heart of Midlothian	1989–90	Scottish Premier Division	33	2	3	0	3	1	—		39	3
Heart of Midlothian	1990–91	Scottish Premier Division	19	2	—		3	1	3	0	25	3
Heart of Midlothian	1991–92	Scottish Premier Division	13	2	5	0	—		—		18	2
Heart of Midlothian	1992–93	Scottish Premier Division	19	1	2	0	—		3	0	24	1
Heart of Midlothian	Total		114	9	13	2	10	2	14	2	151	11
Hibernian	1993–94	Scottish Premier Division	1	0	—		—		—		1	0
Stenhousemuir	1995–96	Scottish Second Division	29	1	N/A		N/A		—		29	1
Career total			525	104	62	13	79	24	64	10	730	151

== See also ==
- List of footballers in Scotland by number of league appearances (500+)
