= Ryan Hegarty =

Scottish footballer (born 1979)

Personal information
- Full name: Ryan Hegarty
- Date of birth: 3 June 1976 (age 50)
- Place of birth: Edinburgh, Scotland
- Position: Midfielder

Youth career
- 1992–1995: Dundee United

Senior career*
Years	Team	Apps	(Gls)
1995–1997	Dunfermline Athletic	9	(1)
1997–1998	Livingston	3	(0)
- * Club domestic league appearances and goals

Ryan Hegarty (born 3 June 1976) is a Scottish former footballer who played as a midfielder for Dunfermline Athletic and Livingston.

== Career ==
=== Playing career ===
Hegarty was a product of the Dundee United youth academy. He played for the Arabs in several friendly games, but left the club in 1995 without making a competitive appearance.

Following his departure from Tannadice Park, Hegarty signed for Dunfermline Athletic, where his father Kevin had played in the 1970s and 80s. He made 9 appearances for the Pars and scored once.

In 1997, Hegarty was on the move again and signed for Livingston. Injury was to delay his first appearance for the club. After four months on the sidelines, he came on as a substitute to make his debut for Livi in a 2–0 defeat against Clyde. His injury problems proved to be a hurdle he could not overcome and was forced to retire at the age of 22 after a specialist examination revealed a stress fracture of the spine.

== Personal life ==
Ryan is the son of former Dunfermline Athletic player Kevin Hegarty and the nephew of former Dundee United player and manager Paul Hegarty.
