= Davie Dodds =

Scottish footballer (born 1958)

Personal information
- Date of birth: 23 September 1958 (age 68)
- Place of birth: Dundee, Scotland
- Position: Striker

Youth career
- 1967–1971: Celtic Boys Club
- 1971–1975: Dundee United

Senior career*
Years	Team	Apps	(Gls)
1975–1986	Dundee United	243	(102)
1977–1978	→ Arbroath (loan)	6	(1)
1986	Neuchâtel Xamax	1	(0)
1986–1989	Aberdeen	72	(17)
1989–1991	Rangers	17	(4)
Total		339	(124)

International career
1978	Scotland U21	1	(0)
1983	Scotland	2	(1)
- * Club domestic league appearances and goals

David Dodds (born 23 September 1958) is a Scottish former footballer who played for Dundee United, Aberdeen and Rangers in the 1980s. With United, he was a Scottish League champion in 1983 and was in their winning 1980 Scottish League Cup final-winning team, scoring in the match. During his playing career he scored over 100 League goals. He earned two Scotland caps.

== Early life and career ==
Dodds was born and brought up in Dundee and lived close to the city's two football stadia, regularly attending both Dundee United and Dundee fixtures. He started his playing career at Celtic Boys Club, aged 9, where he was played at left-back. However, at the age of 14 he signed schoolboy forms with local club Dundee United. Developing into a promising striker, he turned professional with United in 1975, but was initially part-time while also serving an apprenticeship as a painter and decorator, his father's occupation.

== Club career ==
=== Dundee United ===
Dodds left Hillside Boys Club in December 1972 and signed a S form with Dundee United. He began playing for the reserves in a short period of time and, in 1975, acquired a professional deal with United. He made his first team debut for United against Arbroath in August 1976, scoring twice in a 3–1 victory, but it took several years for him to fully establish himself as a first team regular. During the 1977–78 season, he played several games for Arbroath on loan.

Dundee United at this time were developing into one of the strongest sides in Scotland. Despite playing in some of the earlier rounds, Dodds missed out on the Scottish League Cup final in 1979 when the club lifted their first ever major trophy, but the following year he was part of the side that defeated city rivals Dundee in the final to retain the cup. He scored United's first goal in a 3–0 victory at Dundee's Dens Park ground.

By this time Dodds was featuring regularly in the side and forming a profitable attacking partnership, as a 'target man' alongside the diminutive Paul Sturrock. In 1982–83 they were part of the United side that lifted the Scottish League title for the first time, with Dodds contributing 22 goals. The following season saw Dodds star in the club's run to the European Cup semi-finals. He would also finish on the losing side in two Scottish Cup finals with United, in 1981 and 1985.

Despite this run of success, Dodds was becoming unsettled at Dundee United. Despite the efforts of manager Jim McLean to keep the player at Tannadice, he left the club at the end of his contract in 1986.

=== Later career ===
In summer 1986, Dodds joined Swiss club Neuchâtel Xamax, whom he had played against for Dundee United in the previous season's UEFA Cup campaign. United received a fee of £180,000. However, personal problems (his wife's postnatal depression) led to the player seeking a move back to Scotland within months, and he was brought to Aberdeen by Alex Ferguson, although within weeks the manager who signed him had moved on. Dodds' most significant contribution during his spell at Pittodrie was finding the net twice in the 1988 Scottish League Cup final at Hampden Park, but opponents Rangers pulled ahead in the final minutes to win the contest 3–2.

As he moved into his thirties, he was featuring in the Dons' first team only infrequently, but in late 1989 he was then signed for Rangers, reigning Scottish champions and Dodds' boyhood favourites. The move was surprising given that Rangers manager Graeme Souness had previously likened Dodds to 'a basketball player' when he played against them for Aberdeen. Having been brought to Ibrox primarily as squad cover, Dodds played only a small number of first team matches, sometimes filling in within the defence or midfield, before retiring from playing in 1991. Rangers retained his registration, and due to injuries and foreign player restrictions he was named among the substitutes for a UEFA Champions League match at home to Olympique Marseille in November 1992.

== International career ==
Dodds scored on his international debut for Scotland in a 2–0 win over Uruguay in September 1983.

== Coaching career ==
After retiring as a player, Dodds was appointed to Rangers' coaching staff – as first team coach – and continued to be employed there until 1997, being part of the backroom staff under manager Walter Smith, his former teammate at Dundee United, during many of the club's successes in the period (six league titles, three Scottish Cups and five League Cups). After parting company with the club he decided not to seek further employment in football coaching.

== Career statistics ==
=== Club ===
Appearances and goals by club, season and competition
Club	Seasons	League			National cup		League cup		Europe		Total	
Club	Seasons	Division	Apps	Goals	Apps	Goals	Apps	Goals	Apps	Goals	Apps	Goals
Dundee United	1975–76	Scottish Premier Division	0	0	0	0	0	0	0	0	0	0
Dundee United	1976–77	Scottish Premier Division	0	0	0	0	4	2	0	0	4	2
Dundee United	1977–78	Scottish Premier Division	10	1	1	0	1	1	0	0	12	2
Dundee United	1978–79	Scottish Premier Division	27	10	1	0	0	0	2	0	30	10
Dundee United	1979–80	Scottish Premier Division	21	6	1	0	4	2	4	0	30	8
Dundee United	1980–81	Scottish Premier Division	24	14	7	5	7	2	2	2	40	23
Dundee United	1981–82	Scottish Premier Division	35	14	5	2	9	3	8	3	57	22
Dundee United	1982–83	Scottish Premier Division	36	22	1	0	10	5	8	1	55	28
Dundee United	1983–84	Scottish Premier Division	33	15	4	1	9	7	8	3	54	26
Dundee United	1984–85	Scottish Premier Division	26	8	6	4	4	3	4	1	40	16
Dundee United	1985–86	Scottish Premier Division	31	12	5	0	5	0	4	1	45	13
Dundee United	Total		243	102	31	12	53	25	40	11	367	150
Arbroath (loan)	1977–78	Scottish First Division	6	1	0	0	0	0	0	0	6	1
Neuchâtel Xamax	1986–87	Swiss Super League	1	0	–		–		–		1+	0+
Aberdeen	1986–87	Scottish Premier Division	25	4	3	0	0	0	0	0	28	4
Aberdeen	1987–88	Scottish Premier Division	23	9	5	4	2	2	0	0	30	15
Aberdeen	1988–89	Scottish Premier Division	23	4	4	0	5	3	2	0	34	7
Aberdeen	1989–90	Scottish Premier Division	1	0	0	0	1	0	0	0	2	0
Aberdeen	Total		72	17	12	4	8	5	2	0	94	26
Rangers	1989–90	Scottish Premier Division	14	4	1	0	0	0	0	0	15	4
Rangers	1990–91	Scottish Premier Division	3	0	1	0	0	0	2	1	6	1
Rangers	1991–92	Scottish Premier Division	0	0	0	0	0	0	0	0	0	0
Rangers	1992–93	Scottish Premier Division	0	0	0	0	0	0	0	0	0	0
Rangers	Total		17	4	2	0	0	0	2	1	21	5
Career total			339	124	45	16	61	30	44	12	489	182

=== International ===
Appearances and goals by national team and year
National team	Year	Apps	Goals
Scotland	1983	2	1
Total		2	1

Scores and results list Scotland's goal tally first, score column indicates score after each Dodds goal

List of international goals scored by Davie Dodds
No.	Date	Venue	Opponent	Score	Result	Competition
1	21 September 1983	Hampden Park, Glasgow, Scotland	Uruguay	2–0	2–0	Friendly

== Honours ==
Dundee United

- Scottish Premier Division: 1982–83
- Scottish League Cup: 1980–81
  - Runners-up 1984–85
- Scottish Cup: Runners-up 1980–81, 1984–85

Aberdeen

- Scottish League Cup: Runners-up 1988–89

Rangers

- Scottish Premier Division: 1989–90
