= 1985–86 in Scottish football =

Premier Division champions
- Celtic

Division One champions
- Hamilton Academical

Division Two champions
- Dunfermline Athletic

Scottish Cup winners
- Aberdeen

League Cup winners
- Aberdeen

Junior Cup winners
- Auchinleck Talbot

Teams in Europe
- Aberdeen, Celtic, Dundee United, Rangers, St Mirren

Scotland national team
- 1986 World Cup qualification, 1986 World Cup, Rous Cup
- ← 1984–85 1986–87 →

The 1985–86 season was the 89th season of competitive football in Scotland.

At a national level, Scotland's qualification for the 1986 World Cup finals in Mexico was marred by the death of Manager Jock Stein. In the end caretaker manager Alex Ferguson was not able to take the team beyond the first round.

In club football, with Rangers once again failing to mount a title challenge, manager Jock Wallace's second spell as manager ended in April when he was sacked and the club appointed Graeme Souness as player-manager, recruiting the former Liverpool midfielder from Sampdoria in Italy. Celtic eventually won the league on the final day after Hearts threw away a two-point lead.

Aberdeen won both the Scottish Cup and the League Cup.

== Scottish Premier Division ==
Celtic won the League and became champions in one of the closest finishes in League history. On the final day of the season Hearts were leading Celtic by two points - a draw against Dundee would have been sufficient to see them win their first League title since the 1959–60 season. Hearts lost 2–0 to Dundee at Dens Park thanks to two late goals by substitute Albert Kidd, while Celtic beat St Mirren 5–0 at Love Street. As a result, Celtic won the league on goal difference.

Relegation was suspended due to league reconstruction, therefore Motherwell and Clydebank retained their Premier Division status.

A dispute between television companies and the Scottish Football League resulted in no televised Scottish league football between September 1985 and March 1986.

Pos	Team	Pld	W	D	L	GF	GA	GD	Pts	Qualification
1	Celtic (C)	36	20	10	6	67	38	+29	50	Qualification for the European Cup first round
2	Heart of Midlothian	36	20	10	6	59	33	+26	50	Qualification for the UEFA Cup first round
3	Dundee United	36	18	11	7	59	31	+28	47	Qualification for the UEFA Cup first round
4	Aberdeen	36	16	12	8	62	31	+31	44	Qualification for the Cup Winners' Cup first round
5	Rangers	36	13	9	14	53	45	+8	35	Qualification for the UEFA Cup first round
6	Dundee	36	14	7	15	45	51	−6	35	
7	St Mirren	36	13	5	18	42	63	−21	31	
8	Hibernian	36	11	6	19	49	63	−14	28	
9	Motherwell	36	7	6	23	33	66	−33	20	
10	Clydebank	36	6	8	22	29	77	−48	20	

Source: Rsssf
Rules for classification: 1) points; 2) goal difference; 3) number of goals scored.
(C) Champions

Champions: Celtic
No relegation

== Scottish League Division One ==
Pos	Team	Pld	W	D	L	GF	GA	GD	Pts	Promotion or relegation
1	Hamilton Academical (C, P)	39	24	8	7	77	44	+33	56	Promotion to the Premier Division
2	Falkirk (P)	39	17	11	11	57	39	+18	45	Promotion to the Premier Division
3	Kilmarnock	39	18	8	13	62	49	+13	44	
4	Forfar Athletic	39	17	10	12	51	43	+8	44	
5	East Fife	39	14	15	10	54	46	+8	43	
6	Dumbarton	39	16	11	12	59	52	+7	43	
7	Morton	39	14	11	14	57	63	−6	39	
8	Partick Thistle	39	10	16	13	53	64	−11	36	
9	Airdrieonians	39	12	11	16	51	50	+1	35	
10	Brechin City	39	13	9	17	58	64	−6	35	
11	Clyde	39	9	17	13	49	59	−10	35	
12	Montrose	39	10	14	15	43	54	−11	34	
13	Ayr United (R)	39	10	11	18	41	60	−19	31	Relegation to the Second Division
14	Alloa Athletic (R)	39	6	14	19	49	74	−25	26	Relegation to the Second Division

Source: RSSSF and statto
Rules for classification: 1) points; 2) goal difference; 3) number of goals scored.
(C) Champions; (P) Promoted; (R) Relegated

Promoted: Hamilton Academical, Falkirk
Relegated: Ayr United, Alloa Athletic.

== Scottish League Division Two ==
Pos	Team	Pld	W	D	L	GF	GA	GD	Pts	Promotion
1	Dunfermline Athletic (C, P)	39	23	11	5	91	47	+44	57	Promotion to the First Division
2	Queen of the South (P)	39	23	9	7	71	36	+35	55	Promotion to the First Division
3	Meadowbank Thistle	39	19	11	9	68	45	+23	49	
4	Queen's Park	39	19	8	12	61	39	+22	46	
5	Stirling Albion	39	18	8	13	57	53	+4	44	
6	St Johnstone	39	18	6	15	63	55	+8	42	
7	Stenhousemuir	39	16	8	15	55	63	−8	40	
8	Arbroath	39	15	9	15	56	50	+6	39	
9	Raith Rovers	39	15	7	17	67	65	+2	37	
10	Cowdenbeath	39	14	9	16	52	53	−1	37	
11	East Stirlingshire	39	11	6	22	49	69	−20	28	
12	Berwick Rangers	39	7	11	21	45	80	−35	25	
13	Albion Rovers	39	8	8	23	38	86	−48	24	
14	Stranraer	39	9	5	25	41	83	−42	23	

Source: "1985-1986 Second Division - SPFL Archive". SPFL.
Rules for classification: 1) points; 2) goal difference; 3) number of goals scored.
(C) Champions; (P) Promoted

Promoted: Dunfermline Athletic, Queen of the South

== Other honours ==
=== Cup honours ===
Competition	Winner	Score	Runner-up
Scottish Cup 1985–86	Aberdeen	3 – 0	Heart of Midlothian
League Cup 1985–86	Aberdeen	3 – 0	Hibernian
Youth Cup	Aberdeen	2 – 0	Queen of the South
Junior Cup	Auchinleck Talbot	3 – 2	Pollok

=== Individual honours ===
Award	Winner	Club
Footballer of the Year	(Scotland) Sandy Jardine	Heart of Midlothian
Players' Player of the Year	(Scotland) Richard Gough	Dundee United
Young Player of the Year	(Scotland) Craig Levein	Heart of Midlothian

== Scotland national team ==
Date	Venue	Opponents	Score	Competition	Scotland scorer(s)
10 September 1985	Ninian Park, Cardiff (A)	Wales	1–1	WCQG7	Davie Cooper
16 October 1985	Hampden Park, Glasgow (H)	East Germany	0–0	Friendly	
20 November 1985	Hampden Park, Glasgow (H)	Australia	2–0	WCQPO	Davie Cooper, Frank McAvennie
4 December 1985	Olympic Park Stadium, Melbourne (A)	Australia	0–0	WCQPO	
28 January 1986	Ramat Gan Stadium, Ramat Gan (A)	Israel	1–0	Friendly	Paul McStay
26 March 1986	Hampden Park, Glasgow (H)	Romania	3–0	Friendly	Gordon Strachan, Richard Gough, Roy Aitken
23 April 1986	Wembley Stadium, London (A)	England	1–2	Rous Cup	Graeme Souness (pen.)
29 April 1986	Philips Stadion, Eindhoven (A)	Netherlands	0–0	Friendly	
4 June 1986	Estadio Neza 86, Nezahualcóyotl (N)	Denmark	0–1	WCGE	
8 June 1986	Estadio La Corregidora, Querétaro (N)	West Germany	1–2	WCGE	Gordon Strachan
13 June 1986	Estadio Neza 86, Nezahualcóyotl (N)	Uruguay	0–0	WCGE	

Key:

- (H) = Home match
- (A) = Away match
- WCQG7 = World Cup qualifying - Group 7
- WCQPO = World Cup qualifying play-off match
- WCGE = World Cup - Group E

=== Death of Jock Stein ===
On 10 September 1985, the Scotland team travelled to Ninian Park, Cardiff, to take on Wales in their final qualifying game for the World Cup in Mexico. They needed at least a draw to secure a place in the qualification play-off, which they finally achieved in the 81st minute when a Davie Cooper penalty drew Scotland level with Wales, who had gone ahead earlier with a Mark Hughes goal. Just after the final whistle, Scotland manager Jock Stein collapsed from a heart attack at the side of the pitch and died in the medical room shortly afterwards. He was 62 years old.

Aberdeen manager Alex Ferguson, who had been Stein's assistant, was appointed caretaker manager of Scotland after Stein's death. His first match was at Hampden Park on 20 November 1985, as Scotland took on Australia in the World Cup qualification playoff first leg. Goals from Davie Cooper and the debutant Frank McAvennie gave Scotland a 2-0 advantage, and they confirmed their place in Mexico by drawing the second leg 0–0 in Melbourne. Scotland's World Cup campaign began on 4 June, when they took on Denmark in their opening group game, only to lose 1–0. Four days later, they took on West Germany and despite taking an early lead through Gordon Strachan, lost 2-1 and were left with virtually no hope of reaching the knockout stages. Any hope of progression ended five days later when they could only manage a goalless draw against Uruguay.

=== Kenny Dalglish 100th cap ===
Three weeks after his 35th birthday, Kenny Dalglish became the Scotland team's first player to be capped 100 times as senior level in a friendly against Romania on 26 March 1986.

== See also ==
1985–86 Aberdeen F.C. season
1985–86 Dundee United F.C. season
