= Paul Hegarty =

Scottish footballer & manager (born 1954)

Personal information
- Full name: Paul Anthony Hegarty
- Date of birth: 25 July 1954 (age 72)
- Place of birth: Edinburgh, Scotland
- Position: Defender

Youth career
- Tynecastle Boys Club

Senior career*
Years	Team	Apps	(Gls)
1972–1974	Hamilton Academical	67	(17)
1974–1990	Dundee United	493	(52)
1990	St. Johnstone	14	(1)
1990–1992	Forfar Athletic	40	(1)
Total		628	(76)

International career
1978	Scottish League XI	1	(0)
1979–1983	Scotland	8	(0)

Managerial career
- 1990–1992: Forfar Athletic
- 1999: Aberdeen
- 2002–2003: Dundee United
- 2008–2009: Livingston
- 2015–2016: Montrose
- * Club domestic league appearances and goals

Paul Anthony Hegarty (born 25 July 1954) is a Scottish football player and manager. He was captain of Dundee United during their most successful era in the 1970s and 1980s, winning the Scottish league championship in 1983 and the Scottish League Cup twice. Hegarty won eight full international caps for Scotland. He has managed Forfar Athletic, Aberdeen, Dundee United, Livingston and Montrose.

== Playing career ==
=== Hamilton Academical ===
Hegarty's senior career began as a striker with Hamilton Accies in 1972.

=== Dundee United ===
In November 1974, Dundee United manager Jim McLean signed him for a fee of £27,500. Two years later, McLean transformed Hegarty's career when he experimented by pairing him with Dave Narey in United's central defence. The partnership they forged would be integral to United's successes for over a decade and Hegarty would develop into a top class central defender. As club captain, Hegarty led United to their first ever major trophy, the Scottish League Cup in 1979, which they retained the following year.

In 1982–83, Hegarty was an ever-present as United captured the Scottish League title. Hegarty temporarily played as a goalkeeper during a match against Morton that season, after Hamish McAlpine was injured. He also featured in many notable victories in European competition, albeit injury restricted his participation in United's run to the 1987 UEFA Cup Final.

In recognition of his contribution to Dundee United, the club allowed him to leave on a free transfer in January 1990.

=== St Johnstone ===
He briefly played for St. Johnstone, helping them to promotion.

=== Scotland ===
Hegarty represented his country between 1979 and 1983, captaining the side against Northern Ireland in his eighth and final appearance for Scotland. He is widely regarded as one of the best central halves to have never been a regular for Scotland. He also turned out for the under-21 side as a permitted over-age player and represented the Scottish League.

== Coaching career ==
Hegarty's first coaching role was with Forfar Athletic as player/manager. The team were relegated in 1992 and Hegarty left shortly afterwards.

He then had coaching roles with Dundee United (leaving Tannadice in 1995), Hearts and Aberdeen. Following the dismissal of Alex Miller in January 1999, he was appointed Aberdeen manager on an interim basis. However, despite saving the club from relegation, Aberdeen elected at the end of the season not to continue with Hegarty in the job on a long-term basis.

Once again, Dundee United offered Hegarty a coaching role. This became a manager role in October 2002 after chairman Eddie Thompson was unable to prise first-choice Ian McCall from Falkirk. Initially appointed as caretaker, Hegarty's role was to be extended until the end of the season before he was sacked in January 2003 – and subsequently replaced with McCall.

Hegarty continued to work in coaching, having been on the staff of both Livingston and then Dunfermline. While at Dunfermline, Hegarty was approached by Inverness CT to be part of the management with former Dundee United colleague Maurice Malpas, although the move never materialised. He was eventually appointed as assistant to Malpas at Motherwell on 25 May 2006, although later replaced by Scott Leitch when Malpas was sacked in June 2007.

In March 2008, Hegarty became one of new Scotland manager George Burley's scouts for the World Cup qualifying group. In December 2008 he was appointed as the manager of Livingston after Roberto Landi was sacked. Livingston had severe financial problems, however, and Hegarty left the post a few months later. He left his position with the Scotland national team in November 2009.

Hegarty returned to Dundee United in February 2010. Following the resignation of manager Peter Houston in January 2013, Hegarty was named as the club's caretaker manager. While he was due to take charge of an SPL match against Motherwell, the match was postponed due to a waterlogged pitch, and Jackie McNamara was named as the club's manager before the next match came around. Hegarty left the club soon afterwards.

Hegarty returned to management in February 2015 when he was appointed manager of Montrose, then placed last in Scottish League Two. He couldn't prevent the side from finishing last at the end of the 2014–15 season which was the first season that a new play-off system with a non-Scottish Professional Football League from both the Highland Football League and Lowland Football League. The club won the first two-legged final against Brora Rangers of the Highland Football League to avoid relegation. Soon after, Hegarty was appointed permanent manager on a two-year contract at Links Park alongside assistant and former United teammate John Holt. Hegarty was sacked by Montrose in November 2016, after a run of bad results left the club in ninth position in the league.

== Personal life ==
Hegarty's elder brother Kevin played for Dunfermline Athletic as did his nephew (Kevin's son), Ryan. His son Chris came through the Dundee academy and had a 13-year playing career with teams across the north-east of Scotland, including Peterhead, Arbroath, Forfar Athletic and two spells with Montrose, the latter of which saw Chris end his career having been signed by his father.

== Career statistics ==
Appearances and goals by club, season and competition
Club	Season	League			Scottish Cup		League Cup		Europe		Total	
Club	Season	Division	Apps	Goals	Apps	Goals	Apps	Goals	Apps	Goals	Apps	Goals
Hamilton Academical	1972–73	Scottish Division Two	81	22							81	22
Hamilton Academical	1973–74	Scottish Division Two	81	22							81	22
Hamilton Academical	1974–75	Scottish Division Two	81	22							81	22
Hamilton Academical	Total		81	22							81	22
Dundee United	1974–75	Scottish Division One	17	4	2	0	-		-		19	4
Dundee United	1975–76	Scottish Premier Division	33	8	3	1	4	0	3	2	43	11
Dundee United	1976–77	Scottish Premier Division	36	6	1	0	6	3	-		43	9
Dundee United	1977–78	Scottish Premier Division	36	4	4	2	8	3	2	0	50	9
Dundee United	1978–79	Scottish Premier Division	36	5	1	0	2	0	2	0	41	5
Dundee United	1979–80	Scottish Premier Division	27	0	2	0	7	2	4	0	40	2
Dundee United	1980–81	Scottish Premier Division	33	3	7	2	11	4	4	1	55	10
Dundee United	1981–82	Scottish Premier Division	36	2	5	0	7	0	8	2	56	4
Dundee United	1982–83	Scottish Premier Division	36	3	1	0	10	0	8	2	55	5
Dundee United	1983–84	Scottish Premier Division	36	4	3	0	10	0	8	1	57	5
Dundee United	1984–85	Scottish Premier Division	33	2	5	0	6	0	6	3	50	5
Dundee United	1985–86	Scottish Premier Division	36	5	5	0	5	0	6	1	52	6
Dundee United	1986–87	Scottish Premier Division	23	4	4	1	4	0	7	0	38	5
Dundee United	1987–88	Scottish Premier Division	41	1	9	1	3	0	4	0	57	2
Dundee United	1988–89	Scottish Premier Division	29	1	6	0	2	0	4	0	41	1
Dundee United	1989–90	Scottish Premier Division	31	0	5	0	2	0	3	0	41	0
Dundee United	Total		519	52	63	7	87	12	69	12	738	83
St Johnstone	1989–90	Scottish First Division	14	1							14	1
Forfar Athletic	1990–91	Scottish First Division	40	1							40	1
Forfar Athletic	1991–92	Scottish First Division	40	1							40	1
Forfar Athletic	Total		40	1							40	1
Career total			654	76	63	7	87	12	69	12	873	107

== Honours ==
=== Player ===
Dundee United

- Scottish Premier Division: 1982–83
- Scottish League Cup: 1978–79, 1979–80
  - Runner-up 1980–81, 1984–85
- UEFA Cup: Runner-up 1986–87
- Scottish Cup: Runner-up 1980–81, 1984–85, 1986–87, 1987–88

St Johnstone

- Scottish First Division (second tier): 1989–90

=== Individual ===
- PFA Scotland Players' Player of the Year: 1979

== Managerial statistics ==
As of 12 November 2016

Team	Nat	From	To	Record				
Team	Nat	From	To	G	W	D	L	Win %
Forfar Athletic	(Scotland)	1990	1992					
Aberdeen (interim)	(Scotland)	January 1999	May 1999	16	4	1	11	25.00
Dundee United	(Scotland)	October 2002	January 2003	18	4	5	9	22.22
Livingston	(Scotland)	December 2008	April 2009	19	6	5	8	31.58
Montrose	(Scotland)	February 2015	November 2016	71	20	14	37	28.17
Total				124	34	25	65	27.42

- no statistics currently available for Forfar Athletic.

== See also ==
- List of footballers in Scotland by number of league appearances (500+)
- List of Scottish football families
- List of Scotland national football team captains
