= Graeme Payne =

Scottish footballer

Personal information
- Date of birth: 13 February 1956 (age 70)
- Place of birth: Dundee, Scotland
- Position: Winger

Senior career*
Years	Team	Apps	(Gls)
1973–1984	Dundee United	200	(12)
1982–1983	→ Morton (loan)	18	(2)
1984–1985	Arbroath	44	(3)
1985–1986	Brechin City	41	(3)
1986–1987	St Johnstone	26	(5)
Total		329	(25)

International career
1977–1978	Scotland U21	3	(0)
- * Club domestic league appearances and goals

Graeme Payne (born 13 February 1956) is a Scottish former footballer who played as a winger. At Dundee United he played in two Scottish League Cup final winning teams. He was the first winner of the Scottish PFA Young Player of the Year award.

== Playing career ==
=== Club ===
Graeme Payne was born in Dundee on 13 February 1956. While playing for St Columba's Boys Club, he joined Dundee United on schoolboy forms in May 1971. When Jim McLean became Dundee United manager later that year, he placed great emphasis on the club developing its own youth players, and Payne would be one of the first to break through. As a provisional signing, he was called up to play for the reserve team in 1972. After turning professional, he made his first team debut aged 17 on the opening day of the 1973–74 season, playing against East Fife in a Scottish League Cup match. He continued to feature regularly over the following season, culminating with an appearance in the 1974 Scottish Cup Final defeat against Celtic. Previously, Payne's goal against Heart of Midlothian in the semi-final replay had helped United through to what was their first appearance in the final of the competition.

After his appearances during the 1975–76 season were limited by injuries, Payne re-established himself as a first team player in the latter part of the 1970s and won the first ever SPFA Young Player of the Year award in 1978. He was part of the Dundee United team that won the club's first two major trophies, playing in the 1979 Scottish League Cup Final win against Aberdeen, and the 1980 Final, when United retained the trophy against Dundee. By the 1980s, however, Payne was featuring less often in the first team. When Dundee United were Premier Division champions in 1982–83, he made only three league appearances and spent the second half of the season on loan to Morton.

Payne left Dundee United in May 1984, joining Arbroath for a nominal transfer fee, and also had spells with Brechin City and St Johnstone before retiring from football to working the insurance industry.

=== International ===
Payne represented Scotland at youth and under-21 international level. He was named in the preliminary pool of forty players for the 1978 World Cup, but didn't make the final squad and never appeared at full international level.

== Personal life ==
His brother, Kenny Payne, was also a professional footballer, who played for Arbroath and Forfar Athletic.

== Honours ==
Dundee United:

- Scottish Cup Runner-up

1973–74

- Scottish League Cup:

1979–80, 1980–81

=== Individual ===
- Scottish PFA Young Player of the Year:

1977–78
