= Maurice Malpas =

Scottish football player and coach

Personal information
- Full name: Maurice Daniel Robert Malpas
- Date of birth: 3 August 1962 (age 64)
- Place of birth: Dunfermline, Scotland
- Height: 5 ft 8 in (1.73 m)
- Position: Defender

Youth career
- Leven Royals

Senior career*
Years	Team	Apps	(Gls)
1979–2000	Dundee United	617	(20)

International career
1982–1984	Scotland U21	8	(0)
1984–1992	Scotland	55	(0)
1990	SFA (SFL centenary)	1	(0)

Managerial career
- 2005–2006: Scotland U21 (caretaker)
- 2006–2007: Motherwell
- 2007–2008: Scotland U21 (caretaker)
- 2008: Swindon Town
- * Club domestic league appearances and goals

Maurice Daniel Robert Malpas (born 3 August 1962) is a Scottish former football player and coach. He signed for Dundee United in 1979 and spent his entire professional playing career with the club until his retirement in 2000. With him, United were Scottish champions in 1983 and Scottish Cup winners in 1994. European runs there included reaching the 1983–84 European Cup semi final and the 1987 UEFA Cup final.

Malpas made his debut for the Scotland national team in 1984. He went on to gain 55 caps, making him a member of the Scotland national football team roll of honour. He played for Scotland at two World Cups and one UEFA European Championship final tournaments.

Malpas began a coaching career in 1991 whilst still a Dundee United player, continuing as a coach after his retirement until leaving the club in 2003. He joined Motherwell as assistant manager to Terry Butcher before becoming manager from 2006 until 2007. He coached the Scotland under-21 team on a temporary basis before another brief spell in club management with Swindon Town during 2008. More recently he has been assistant manager to Butcher at both Inverness Caledonian Thistle and Hibernian.

== Early life ==
Malpas was born on 3 August 1962 in Dunfermline, Fife, and attended Queen Anne High School.

== Playing career ==
=== Dundee United ===
Malpas trained with Dunfermline Athletic before joining Leven Royals under-14s team.

He signed for Dundee United in August 1979. His total of 830 competitive first team appearances is the second highest in the club's history. Malpas initially combined his football career with studying for an electrical engineering degree at Dundee College of Technology (now Abertay University), and didn't become a full-time professional until 1984. Despite this, he made his debut in for Dundee United in 1981 and won the Scottish Football League Premier Division title in 1983. In the subsequent 1983–84 European Cup, United reached the semi-final.

United made it to the final of the 1986–87 UEFA Cup; en route they defeated Terry Venables' FC Barcelona side home and away in the quarter-final, and inflicted a first home defeat on Borussia Mönchengladbach in 55 European games going back to 1970 in the semi-final. They lost 2–1 on aggregate to IFK Gothenburg in the final, the second leg of which was their 70th match of the season.

United and Malpas played in five Scottish Cup finals in nine years: in 1985 they took the lead but lost 2–1 to Celtic. In 1987 (played in between the two legs of the UEFA Cup final) they lost 1–0 St Mirren. In 1988 against Celtic, the pattern of 1985 was almost repeated but this time it was an even later goal which defeated United. In 1991, they suffered a 4–3 extra time defeat to Motherwell. Captain Malpas lifted the trophy when Craig Brewster scored the only goal in the 1994 Scottish Cup Final win against Rangers. On 22 May 2000, he intended to end his playing career at the end of the 1999-00 season.

Malpas won the SFWA Footballer of the Year award in 1991. His long service was rewarded with two testimonial matches, in 1991 and 2000. He was inducted into the Dundee United Hall of Fame as one of its inaugural members in 2008.

=== Scotland ===
Winning first of his caps in 1984, as of 2020 Malpas is the most recent part-time professional to have played for Scotland. He won 55 caps in total. In his 50th international appearance (away to Norway in June 1992) he was made captain to mark the occasion. He had previously captained Scotland in a 1990 Euro 1992 qualifying match against Bulgaria. He appeared for Scotland at the 1986 and 1990 World Cups and at Euro 1992.

== Coaching and managerial career ==
After retiring as a player, Malpas assumed full-time coaching duties at Tannadice, having been acting as player-coach since 1991. He was part of the temporary management team following the dismissal of Alex Smith in October 2002, but left the club in January 2003.

He initially joined Motherwell as assistant manager to former coaching colleague Terry Butcher. Malpas became Motherwell manager in May 2006, following Butcher's departure to coach Sydney FC. He left the club in June 2007 after one season in charge, having taken the team from a comfortable mid-table position to one that narrowly avoided relegation. Malpas became caretaker manager of the Scotland under-21 team in August 2007, but missed out on the permanent position to Billy Stark.

In January 2008, Malpas became manager of Swindon Town after the takeover of the club by local businessman Andrew Fitton, replacing former Dundee United teammate Paul Sturrock. Malpas was sacked by chairman Andrew Fitton on 14 November 2008 after a poor run of results and shock exits in the FA Cup to Histon and in the Football League Trophy within a week. He joined Terry Butcher again as assistant, this time at SPL club Inverness Caledonian Thistle. In 2013, Malpas moved with Butcher to Hibernian, rejecting the chance to manage Inverness. Butcher and Malpas both left Hibernian in June 2014, after the club had been relegated from the Scottish Premiership.

Malpas became director of football at Raith Rovers on 26 December 2014. He left Raith Rovers on 22 May 2015 and was inducted to the Scottish Football Hall of Fame in October 2015.

Malpas returned to Inverness Caledonian Thistle in April 2017, working for manager Richie Foran.

== Career statistics ==
=== Club ===
Appearances and goals by club, season and competition
Club	Season	League			Scottish Cup		League Cup		Europe		Other		Total	
Club	Season	Division	Apps	Goals	Apps	Goals	Apps	Goals	Apps	Goals	Apps	Goals	Apps	Goals
Dundee United	1979–80	Scottish Premier Division	0	0	0	0	0	0	0	0	–		0	0
Dundee United	1980–81	Scottish Premier Division	0	0	0	0	0	0	0	0	–		0	0
Dundee United	1981–82	Scottish Premier Division	19	0	4	0	0	0	2	0	–		25	0
Dundee United	1982–83	Scottish Premier Division	34	1	1	0	8	1	8	0	–		51	2
Dundee United	1983–84	Scottish Premier Division	34	2	4	0	10	0	6	0	–		54	2
Dundee United	1984–85	Scottish Premier Division	35	2	6	0	6	0	5	0	–		52	2
Dundee United	1985–86	Scottish Premier Division	36	2	5	0	5	0	6	0	–		52	2
Dundee United	1986–87	Scottish Premier Division	36	0	7	1	4	0	10	0	–		57	1
Dundee United	1987–88	Scottish Premier Division	44	0	8	1	3	1	4	0	–		59	2
Dundee United	1988–89	Scottish Premier Division	36	1	6	0	4	0	4	0	–		50	1
Dundee United	1989–90	Scottish Premier Division	30	2	4	0	2	0	4	0	–		40	2
Dundee United	1990–91	Scottish Premier Division	36	1	6	0	4	0	4	0	–		50	1
Dundee United	1991–92	Scottish Premier Division	44	3	2	1	3	0	–		–		49	4
Dundee United	1992–93	Scottish Premier Division	37	0	2	0	3	0	–		–		42	0
Dundee United	1993–94	Scottish Premier Division	35	0	8	0	1	0	1	0	–		45	0
Dundee United	1994–95	Scottish Premier Division	31	2	4	1	1	0	2	0	–		38	3
Dundee United	1995–96	Scottish First Division	30	2	2	0	0	0	–		4	0	36	2
Dundee United	1996–97	Scottish Premier Division	26	1	6	0	0	0	–		–		32	1
Dundee United	1997–98	Scottish Premier Division	31	1	4	0	5	0	4	0	–		44	1
Dundee United	1998–99	Scottish Premier League	31	0	4	0	2	0	–		–		37	0
Dundee United	1999-00	Scottish Premier League	12	0	2	0	3	0	–		–		17	0
Career total			617	20	85	4	64	2	60	0	4	0	830	26

=== International ===
Appearances and goals by national team and year
National team	Year	Apps	Goals
Scotland	1984	1	0
Scotland	1985	5	0
Scotland	1986	7	0
Scotland	1987	5	0
Scotland	1988	5	0
Scotland	1989	8	0
Scotland	1990	8	0
Scotland	1991	6	0
Scotland	1992	10	0
Total		55	0

== Managerial statistics ==
As of 14 November 2008

Managerial record by team and tenure
Team	From	To	Record					Ref
Team	From	To	P	W	D	L	Win %	Ref
Motherwell	17 May 2006	1 June 2007	44	14	8	22	31.8	
Swindon Town	15 January 2008	14 November 2008	42	13	11	18	31.0	
Total			86	27	19	40	31.4	—

== Honours ==
Dundee United

- UEFA Cup runner-up: 1986–87
- Scottish Premier Division: 1982–83
- Scottish Cup: 1993–94
  - runner-up 1984–85, 1986–87, 1987–88, 1990–91
- Scottish League Cup runner-up: 1984–85, 1997–98
- Scottish Challenge Cup runner-up: 1995–96

Scotland

- The Rous Cup: 1985
  - runner-up: 1986, 1989

Individual

- SFWA Footballer of the Year: 1991
- Scottish FA International Roll of Honour: 1992
- Scottish Football Hall of Fame inductee: 2015

== See also ==
- List of footballers in Scotland by number of league appearances (500+)
- List of one-club men in association football
- List of Scotland national football team captains
