= Billy Kirkwood =

Scottish footballer and coach

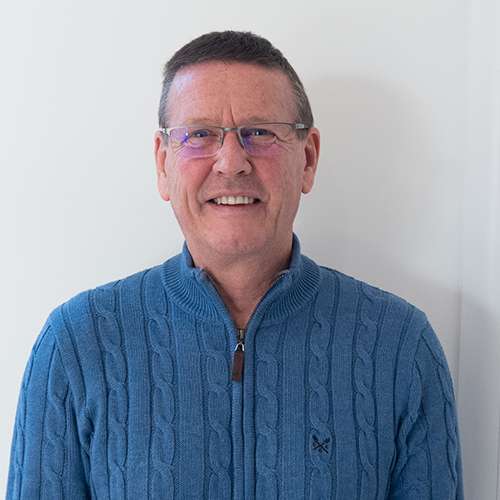
- Kirkwood in 2023

Personal information
- Full name: William Kirkwood
- Date of birth: 1 September 1958 (age 68)
- Place of birth: Edinburgh, Scotland
- Positions: Forward; midfielder

Team information
- Current team: Dundee (head of recruitment)

Senior career*
Years	Team	Apps	(Gls)
1976–1986	Dundee United	249	(44)
1986	Hibernian	26	(1)
1986–1987	Dundee United	12	(1)
1987–1988	Dunfermline Athletic	24	(0)
1988	Dundee	21	(0)
Total		332	(46)

Managerial career
- 1995–1996: Dundee United
- 1997: Instant-Dict
- 2001: St Johnstone (caretaker)
- * Club domestic league appearances and goals

William Kirkwood (born 1 September 1958) is a Scottish coach and former footballer. He began as a forward before moving to midfield. He began his career with Dundee United, where he made 399 appearances in two spells between 1975 and 1987. He won three major domestic trophies with the club, the Scottish League Cup in 1979 and 1980 and the Premier Division title in 1983. He also featured for United in many European runs including to the 1983–84 European Cup semi final and the 1987 UEFA Cup Final.

He also played for Hibernian, Dunfermline Athletic and Dundee. Since retiring as a player he has coach and managed at numerous clubs. He is currently head of recruitment for Dundee.

== Early life ==
Kirkwood was educated at Penicuik High School.

== Playing career ==
Kirkwood made his name with Dundee United making 399 first team appearances. He was initially signed provisionally in May 1975 from Cornbank Boys Club and he started his career at United as an attacker. In 1977–78, he made the breakthrough into the first team and for the next eight years he was a regular in the line up. In his first two seasons, he was club top scorer. He won three domestic trophies with United in two Scottish League Cups (1979–80 and 1980–81) although in the latter match, he remained on the bench. He and United were Scottish league champions in 1982–83. The club reached the European Cup semi-final in 1983–84 and the final of the UEFA Cup in 1986–87. He also collected four domestic cup runners-up medals. He did not play for United in the 1987 Scottish Cup Final defeat to St Mirren.

His time at Dundee United was punctuated by spending the early part of the 1986–87 season with Hibernian returning to United in January 1987. In 1987, after appearing in the Uefa Cup Final, he left United for Dunfermline before finishing his playing days with Dundee.

== Coaching ==
After Ivan Golac was sacked in 1995, Kirkwood was appointed manager of Dundee United. Kirkwood could not prevent the Terrors from being relegated to the First Division. In the following season, Kirkwood guided United to a play-off victory and promotion back to the Premier Division. He was then sacked six games into the 1996-97 season and replaced by Tommy McLean, who would lead United to third place.

In January 1997, Kirkwood was appointed by Instant-Dict FC, a Hong Kong First Division football team as a manager. Seven months later, he resigned and joined Hull City as Mark Hateley's assistant.

Kirkwood had a short caretaker manager role with St Johnstone in 2001, after Sandy Clark was sacked. He has also held the assistant manager position at Dundee, Dunfermline and St Johnstone, and coaching roles with Livingston and Rangers.

== Honours ==
=== Player ===
Dundee United

- UEFA Cup
  - Runner-up (1): 1986–87
- Scottish Premier Division
  - Winner (1): 1982–83
- Scottish Cup
  - Runner-up (3): 1980– 81, 1984– 85, 1986–87
- League Cup
  - Winner (2): 1979– 80, 1980–81
  - Runner-up (2): 1981–82, 1984–85
- Forfarshire Cup
  - Winners (3): 1975–76, 1976–77, 1979–80

=== Manager ===
Dundee United

- Scottish First Division
  - Play-offs: 1995–96
- Scottish Challenge Cup:
  - Runner-up: 1995–96

Rangers Youth

- Scottish Youth Cup
  - Winners (2): 2006–07, 2007–08
  - Runners-up (3): 2008–09, 2009–10, 2010–11
- City of Glasgow Cup
  - Winners: 2011–12, 2012–13
  - Runners-up: 2007–08, 2014–15, 2016–17

=== Individual ===
- DUFC Hall of Fame: 2012 inductee

== See also ==
- Dundee United FC Season 1995-96
- Dundee United FC Season 1996-97
