= Jim McLean =

Scottish footballer, manager, and director (1937–2020)

Personal information
- Full name: James Yuille McLean
- Date of birth: 2 August 1937
- Place of birth: Larkhall, Scotland
- Date of death: 26 December 2020 (aged 83)
- Position: Inside forward

Youth career
- Larkhall Thistle

Senior career*
Years	Team	Apps	(Gls)
1956–1960	Hamilton Academical	129	(57)
1960–1965	Clyde	102	(32)
1965–1968	Dundee	90	(28)
1968–1970	Kilmarnock	56	(7)
Total		377	(124)

Managerial career
- 1971–1993: Dundee United
- * Club domestic league appearances and goals

James Yuille McLean (2 August 1937 – 26 December 2020) was a Scottish football player, manager and director. He managed Dundee United between 1971 and 1993, becoming the longest-serving and most successful manager in the club's history, winning three major honours. He was also part-time assistant manager to Jock Stein with the Scotland national team.

He led Dundee United to their only Scottish Football League title in 1982–83, following Scottish League Cup wins in 1979 and 1980. Under McLean, the club also lost in a further eight domestic cup finals. In European football, McLean's Dundee United reached the European Cup semi-finals in 1984 and the UEFA Cup final in 1987. He became a Dundee United director in 1984 and served as chairman between 1988 and 2000, when he resigned after punching a reporter. His involvement with the club finally ended in 2002 when he sold his majority shareholding.

His playing career included spells with Hamilton Academical, Clyde, Dundee and Kilmarnock as an inside forward. He was a member of a prominent footballing family; his brothers Tommy and Willie were also successful as players and managers.

McLean's achievements saw him win the first ever SFWA Manager of the Year award in 1987. He was inducted into the Scottish Football Hall of Fame in 2005.

== Early life ==
James Yuille McLean was born into a working-class family in Larkhall, Lanarkshire, on 2 August 1937, the second of three sons of Tom and Annie McLean, and grew up in the nearby village of Ashgill. His maternal grandfather William Yuille had been a professional footballer, playing for Rangers before the First World War. Tom McLean, a baker, had been a promising junior footballer before joining the Plymouth Brethren when he married. The three brothers, Willie, Jim and Tommy, who all went on to become professional football players and managers, had a strict religious upbringing. After leaving school McLean served an apprenticeship as a joiner, a vocation he continued to pursue for much of his playing career.

== Playing career ==
McLean, who played as an inside forward, began his football career with the local junior club Larkhall Thistle. He was the third member of the family to play for Larkhall, after his father – who appeared for them in a Scottish Junior Cup semi-final in 1932 – and his brother Willie.

In 1956, he started his senior career with Hamilton Academical. He made more than 125 league appearances for Hamilton before leaving in 1960 to join Clyde. After playing in over 100 league games for Clyde, McLean was transferred to Dundee for £10,000 in 1965. This move meant him becoming a full-time professional footballer for the first time in his career, aged 27. His debut for Dundee came at Dens Park on 11 September 1965 when Dundee were beaten 5–0 by Dundee United, their heaviest ever defeat in a Dundee derby. In his first season with Dundee, McLean scored eight goals, and he became their principal threat in attack after Charlie Cooke was sold to Chelsea in April 1966. McLean scored 17 goals for Dundee during the 1966–67 season, which made him the club's leading scorer. He followed this by scoring 18 goals in the 1967–68 season, during which Dundee reached the Scottish League Cup final (losing 5–3 to Celtic) and the Fairs Cup semi-final (losing 2–1 on aggregate to Leeds United).

Following the signing of George McLean from Rangers, Jim McLean was used more in a midfield role. He was not always popular with the Dundee supporters; McLean later attributed that to him having had to follow higher-class players such as Cooke and Alan Gilzean into their team. Having played in every game for Dundee during the 1967–68 season, he was then dropped for the first match in 1968–69. Days later he was to be sold for £3,000 to Kilmarnock, where he played alongside his brother Tommy. After making a total of 474 appearances and scoring 170 goals in his career, McLean retired from playing in 1970 and returned to Dundee as a coach in July of that year.

== Management career ==
McLean was first team coach at Dundee for 18 months. In November 1971 the club's manager John Prentice announced that he would resign at the end of that year; many outside observers assumed that McLean would become their manager. Instead he became manager of their local rivals Dundee United, where he replaced the retiring Jerry Kerr. McLean immediately started a co-ordinated youth policy which was to produce many fine young players over the two decades which followed; he had personally visited Ralph Milne, John Holt, and Davie Dodds to encourage them to sign for United rather than for Celtic, Aston Villa, and rivals Dundee respectively. In the short term, he used his knowledge of the Scottish scene to buy experienced players who would allow him to re-shape both the squad and the style of play in line with his approach to coaching.

Initially, the club's league form was average, remaining mostly mid-table for the next few years. McLean's first hint of the success he would later achieve was leading the club to its first Scottish Cup final in 1974, which they lost to Celtic. It proved an important psychological step in McLean's and the club's development. The success of the Cup run was built upon the following season with a finish of fourth place, the club's best finish in the Scottish league to date. As the Scottish leagues were restructured after this season, this position qualified United for the new Premier Division. They struggled in the first season of the new setup, and needed a draw at Ibrox on the final day to avoid relegation (Dundee were relegated instead).

By 1978 McLean's reputation as a manager was such that he was mentioned as a possible contender to replace Ally MacLeod as Scotland manager, with Alex Ferguson and Willie Ormond both suggesting him as a possible choice, though McLean himself stated he was not qualified to suggest someone for the position. Ultimately the post went to Jock Stein.

As McLean's youth policy began to bear fruit as a batch of talented young players began to emerge, including Maurice Malpas, Paul Sturrock and David Narey. McLean decided that his team should mount a challenge for the League championship in 1978–79, something of which the club had never previously proved capable of. United started to prove that they were serious contenders for domestic honours. In December 1979, McLean guided his team to triumph in the League Cup by winning a replayed final against Aberdeen. United retained the League Cup in 1980, defeating Dundee in the final. They also reached the Scottish Cup Final in 1981, losing after a replay to Rangers. At the same time as the club was enjoying a high standing Scottish football, McLean was gradually building the club's reputation in Europe.

=== 1980s success ===
"He was a difficult taskmaster because you never really reached his goals. His goals were always just past what you thought was right."

— defender Maurice Malpas discussing McLean's managerial approach.

Despite the progress he had made, few believed that McLean and United were potential Premier Division champions, Alex Ferguson's Aberdeen at that time were an emerging force in addition to the Old Firm. In the 1981–82 UEFA Cup United defeated AS Monaco and Borussia Mönchengladbach, but exited to Yugoslav side Radnicki Nis. At this time McLean was also acting as assistant manager to Jock Stein with the Scotland national team, including at the 1982 World Cup.

In 1982–83, it appeared that United had missed another chance of winning the league championship after they lost to Celtic in the first of two meetings in April. In the second game, United had Richard Gough sent off with the score level but went on to win 3–2. Celtic lost again on the following weekend and this left United in control. A run of wins against Kilmarnock, Morton, Motherwell and Dundee (2–1 at Dens) clinched the league championship for United.

Rangers, who had seen a decline in their fortunes over the previous few years, offered McLean the job as their manager later in 1983. McLean engaged in early negotiations with the club; one of his main problems with the job offer was Rangers' policy of not signing Roman Catholics, a policy McLean found a ridiculous restriction for any employer as his United team included players from both faiths. Despite the Rangers chairman assuring him that this policy would be scrapped if he accepted the job, McLean declined their offer. McLean later said that although moving to Rangers would have been better for his career, it was not the only factor in his decision to stay at Dundee United. His family were happily settled in the Broughty Ferry area of Dundee, and in June 1984 he turned down an offer to manage English club Newcastle United.

Following his team's League success in 1983, Dundee United made their debut in the European Cup. McLean's counter-attacking tactics paired with a pressuring style brought some memorable results in that year's European campaign. United reached the semi-finals of the competition, which they lost 3–2 on aggregate to Roma. Three years later McLean took the team to a European final in the UEFA Cup, defeating Barcelona and Borussia Mönchengladbach en route. United lost 2–1 on aggregate to Swedish club IFK Gothenburg in the final. He won the inaugural Scottish Football Writers' Association Manager of the year award in 1987.

For the rest of his managerial career McLean continued to secure United's high standing in domestic football, finishing no lower than fifth between 1976–77 and 1992–93. He also took the team to six Scottish Cup finals, but never won the trophy. The last of those cup final defeats was in the "family final" of 1991 against Motherwell, who were managed by his brother Tommy.

=== Later years ===
The Dundee United board made McLean a director in 1984; four years later he became chairman and managing director, while still remaining the manager. He retained those joint responsibilities until stepping down as manager in July 1993, after a reign of almost 22 years. He remained as chairman after resigning as manager, stepping down from this role in October 2000 following an attack on BBC Scotland reporter John Barnes. McLean returned briefly in January 2002 as a director but departed a month later. Still a majority shareholder, McLean sold his 42% stake to Eddie Thompson in October 2002, severing his Tannadice ties permanently after more than 30 years.

== After football ==
McLean was recognised for his achievements in football by being inducted into the Scottish Football Hall of Fame in 2005.

McLean contributed a regular column to the Daily Record newspaper, giving his views on football. In October 2006, McLean criticised Eddie Thompson's running of Dundee United in his column, saying he had been a "disaster for the club". This led to the club withdrawing McLean's access "privileges" at Tannadice.

McLean was awarded an honorary doctor of law degree by the University of Dundee in 2011, in recognition of his managerial achievements. He was inducted into the Dundee United Hall of Fame in 2015, with the club describing him as "unquestionably, the most successful manager in the club's history, and unlikely to ever be surpassed". As of August 2018, a group of United supporters were organising a fundraising scheme in order to build a statue of McLean outside Tannadice.

In February 2020, the Dundee Repertory Theatre produced a play about McLean's life called Smile. McLean was unable to attend a performance himself due to ill health, but it received the support of his wife Doris and their family.

== Death ==
Following a long battle with dementia, McLean died in December 2020 aged 83. Dundee United stated that: "An integral part of our history and rise to the forefront of European football, Jim was simply a titan of Dundee United folklore, cherished by the United family the world over." McLean's family, in a statement published by United, added: "Jim was a much-loved husband, father, brother, uncle and father-in-law, and we will all sadly miss him. His remarkable six-decade career made him a true legend not only at Dundee United, but across the world of football."

== Honours ==
=== Player ===
Clyde

- Scottish Division Two : 1961–62
- Glasgow Charity Cup : 1960–61 (shared)

Dundee

- Forfarshire Cup : 1965–66, 1966–67

=== Manager ===
Dundee United

- Scottish Premier Division : 1982–83
- Scottish League Cup : 1979–80, 1980–81
- UEFA Cup : runner-up 1986–87
- Forfarshire Cup: 1971–72, 1974–75, 1975–76, 1976–77, 1979–80, 1984–85, 1986–87, 1987–88

=== Individual ===
- SFWA Manager of the Year: 1987
- Scottish Football Hall of Fame: 2005
- Dundee United Hall of Fame: 2015
- SFA Special Merit Award: 1985
- Honorary Doctor of Law from University of Dundee: 2011
- Scottish Personality (Note: Mackinlay's Football Personality of the Year split into separate Manager and Player of the Year awards in 1984–85. Voted for by panel of football journalists.) / Manager of the Year: 1980–81, 1986–87

== See also ==
- List of longest managerial reigns in association football
- List of football managers with the most matches
