= John Holt (footballer, born 1956) =

Scottish footballer & coach (born 1956)

Personal information
- Full name: John Holt
- Date of birth: 21 November 1956 (age 69)
- Place of birth: Dundee, Scotland
- Positions: Full-back; midfielder

Senior career*
Years	Team	Apps	(Gls)
1973–1987	Dundee United	269	(17)
1987–1988	Dunfermline Athletic	48	(2)
1988–1990	Dundee	21	(0)
1990–1992	Forfar Athletic	51	(0)
1992–1993	Deveronvale		
1993–1994	Montrose	1	(0)

Managerial career
- 1992–1993: Deveronvale
- 1993–1994: Montrose
- 2007–2008: Celtic Women
- 2016: Montrose (caretaker)
- * Club domestic league appearances and goals

John Holt (born 21 November 1956) is a Scottish football coach and retired footballer. He played at either full-back or in midfield. He began his career with Dundee United, where he made more than 400 appearances between 1974 and 1987. Holt won three major domestic trophies with the club, the Scottish League Cup in 1979 and 1980 and the Premier Division title in 1983. He also featured for United in many European runs including to the 1983–84 European Cup semi final and the 1987 UEFA Cup Final.

He also played for Dunfermline Athletic, Dundee and Forfar Athletic before becoming player-manager at Deveronvale and then Montrose. He has also managed Celtic Ladies as well as holding coaching roles at Forfar, Dundee and Dundee United. Holt also had a short period as caretaker manager of Montrose in 2016.

== Playing career ==
Dundee-born Holt broke into the Dundee United first team in 1974 along with the likes of David Narey and Andy Gray. He won three domestic trophies with United in two Scottish League Cups (1979-80 and 1980-81) as well as being Scottish league champions in 1982-83. The club reached the European Cup semi-final in 1983-84 and the final of the UEFA Cup in 1986-87. En route to that UEFA Cup final, Holt was man of the match in the victory against Barcelona at Camp Nou. In the dressing room after the game he told teammate Jim McInally he was thinking of joining Forfar Athletic.

Holt made regular appearances in midfield or defence for the club until 1987, when he left for Dunfermline Athletic. He also later played for Dundee and Forfar Athletic.

== Coaching career ==
Holt became player-manager of Deveronvale and then Montrose. He returned to Dundee United in the mid-1990s and spent several years in many coaching roles, before leaving in 2003 when Ian McCall was appointed manager. Holt went on to become a scout for Celtic, operating in the Dundee area, before joining Dundee as youth development coach. In May 2012, Holt moved on to take an academy role at Dundee United. In February 2015, he became assistant manager on a temporary basis until the end of the season at Montrose under manager and former United teammate Paul Hegarty. After staving off the threat of relegation into the Highland League in a two-leg play-off against Brora Rangers, Holt and Hegarty were offered and accepted their positions on a permanent basis. Both signed two-year deals. After Hegarty was sacked in November 2016, Holt was appointed caretaker manager of the club. Holt left the club after Stewart Petrie was appointed permanent manager on 4 December 2016.

== Honours ==
=== Club ===
Dundee United

- Scottish Football League Premier Division: 1982–83
- Scottish League Cup: 1979–80, 1980–81
