= 1979–80 Scottish League Cup =

Tournament details
- Country: Scotland

Final positions
- Champions: Dundee United
- Runners-up: Aberdeen

Tournament statistics
- Top goal scorer: Paul Sturrock (6)

The 1979–80 Scottish League Cup was the thirty-fourth season of Scotland's second football knockout competition. The competition was won by Dundee United, who defeated Aberdeen in the replayed Final.

== First round ==
=== First leg ===
| Home team | Score | Away team | Date |
|---|---|---|---|
| Aberdeen | 4–0 | Arbroath | 15 August 1979 |
| Dumbarton | 1–1 | St Johnstone | 15 August 1979 |
| East Stirlingshire | 1–1 | Albion Rovers | 15 August 1979 |
| Forfar Athletic | 3–2 | Berwick Rangers | 15 August 1979 |
| Kilmarnock | 2–1 | Alloa Athletic | 15 August 1979 |
| Stranraer | 0–0 | Dunfermline Ath | 15 August 1979 |

=== Second leg ===
| Home team | Score | Away team | Date | Agg |
|---|---|---|---|---|
| Albion Rovers | 4–1 | East Stirlingshire | 27 August 1979 | 5–2 |
| Alloa Athletic | 1–1 | Kilmarnock | 22 August 1979 | 2–3 |
| Arbroath | 2–1 | Aberdeen | 22 August 1979 | 2–5 |
| Berwick Rangers | 2–2 | Forfar Athletic | 22 August 1979 | 4–5 |
| Dunfermline Ath | 2–4 | Stranraer | 22 August 1979 | 2–4 |
| St Johnstone | 3–2 | Dumbarton | 22 August 1979 | 4–3 |

== Second round ==
=== First leg ===
| Home team | Score | Away team | Date |
|---|---|---|---|
| Airdrieonians | 2–1 | Dundee United | 29 August 1979 |
| Ayr United | 2–2 | Heart of Midlothian | 1 September 1979 |
| Clyde | 1–2 | Rangers | 29 August 1979 |
| Clydebank | 0–0 | Hamilton Academical | 29 August 1979 |
| Cowdenbeath | 1–4 | Dundee | 29 August 1979 |
| Falkirk | 1–2 | Celtic | 29 August 1979 |
| Hibernian | 2–1 | Montrose | 29 August 1979 |
| Kilmarnock | 2–0 | Forfar Athletic | 29 August 1979 |
| Meadowbank Thistle | 0–5 | Aberdeen | 29 August 1979 |
| Motherwell | 1–4 | Queen's Park | 29 August 1979 |
| Partick Thistle | 2–2 | Albion Rovers | 29 August 1979 |
| Queen of the South | 0–1 | Morton | 29 August 1979 |
| Raith Rovers | 1–0 | East Fife | 29 August 1979 |
| St Johnstone | 3–1 | Stranraer | 29 August 1979 |
| Stenhousemuir | 1–4 | St Mirren | 28 August 1979 |
| Stirling Albion | 3–1 | Brechin City | 29 August 1979 |

=== Second leg ===
| Home team | Score | Away team | Date | Agg |
|---|---|---|---|---|
| Aberdeen | 2–2 | Meadowbank Thistle | 1 September 1979 | 7–2 |
| Albion Rovers | 0–1 | Partick Thistle | 1 September 1979 | 2–3 |
| Brechin City | 0–1 | Stirling Albion | 1 September 1979 | 1–4 |
| Celtic | 4–1 | Falkirk | 1 September 1979 | 6–2 |
| Dundee | 3–1 | Cowdenbeath | 1 September 1979 | 7–2 |
| Dundee United | 2–0 | Airdrieonians | 1 September 1979 | 3–2 |
| East Fife | 0–2 | Raith Rovers | 1 September 1979 | 0–3 |
| Forfar Athletic | 1–1 | Kilmarnock | 1 September 1979 | 1–3 |
| Hamilton Academical | 1–0 | Clydebank | 2 September 1979 | 1–0 |
| Heart of Midlothian | 0–1 | Ayr United | 3 September 1979 | 2–3 |
| Montrose | 1–1 | Hibernian | 1 September 1979 | 2–3 |
| Morton | 4–0 | Queen of the South | 1 September 1979 | 5–0 |
| Queen's Park | 0–2 | Motherwell | 1 September 1979 | 4–3 |
| Rangers | 4–0 | Clyde | 1 September 1979 | 6–1 |
| St Mirren | 4–2 | Stenhousemuir | 1 September 1979 | 8–3 |
| Stranraer | 3–3 | St Johnstone | 1 September 1979 | 4–6 |

== Third round ==
=== First leg ===
| Home team | Score | Away team | Date |
|---|---|---|---|
| Aberdeen | 3–1 | Rangers | 26 September 1979 |
| Dundee | 2–1 | Ayr United | 26 September 1979 |
| Hamilton Academical | 1–3 | St Mirren | 26 September 1979 |
| Hibernian | 1–2 | Kilmarnock | 26 September 1979 |
| Partick Thistle | 0–1 | Morton | 26 September 1979 |
| Queen's Park | 0–3 | Dundee United | 26 September 1979 |
| Raith Rovers | 1–1 | St Johnstone | 26 September 1979 |
| Stirling Albion | 1–2 | Celtic | 26 September 1979 |

=== Second leg ===
| Home team | Score | Away team | Date | Agg |
|---|---|---|---|---|
| Ayr United | 0–1 | Dundee | 10 October 1979 | 1–3 |
| Celtic | 2–0 | Stirling Albion | 10 October 1979 | 4–1 |
| Dundee United | 2–1 | Queen's Park | 10 October 1979 | 5–1 |
| Kilmarnock | 2–1 | Hibernian | 10 October 1979 | 4–2 |
| Morton | 4–1 | Partick Thistle | 10 October 1979 | 5–1 |
| Rangers | 0–2 | Aberdeen | 10 October 1979 | 1–5 |
| St Johnstone | 1–3 | Raith Rovers | 10 October 1979 | 2–4 |
| St Mirren | 0–2 | Hamilton Academical | 10 October 1979 | 3–3 |

== Quarter-finals ==
=== First leg ===
| Home team | Score | Away team | Date |
|---|---|---|---|
| Aberdeen | 3–2 | Celtic | 31 October 1979 |
| Dundee United | 0–0 | Raith Rovers | 31 October 1979 |
| Hamilton Academical | 3–1 | Dundee | 31 October 1979 |
| Morton | 3–2 | Kilmarnock | 31 October 1979 |

=== Second leg ===
| Home team | Score | Away team | Date | Agg |
|---|---|---|---|---|
| Celtic | 0–1 | Aberdeen | 24 November 1979 | 2–4 |
| Dundee | 1–0 | Hamilton Academical | 14 November 1979 | 2–3 |
| Kilmarnock | 3–2 | Morton | 24 November 1979 | 5–5 |
| Raith Rovers | 0–1 | Dundee United | 14 November 1979 | 0–1 |

== Semi-finals ==
| Home team | Score | Away team | Date |
|---|---|---|---|
| Aberdeen | 2–1 | Morton | 1 December 1979 |
| Dundee United | 6–2 | Hamilton Academical | 24 November 1979 |

== Final ==
8 December 1979

| Dundee United | 0–0 | Aberdeen |

Hampden Park, Glasgow
Attendance: 27,173

=== Replay ===
12 December 1979

| Dundee United | 3–0 | Aberdeen |
|---|---|---|
| Pettigrew; Pettigrew; Sturrock |

Dens Park, Dundee
Attendance: 28,933
