= 1977–78 in Scottish football =

Premier Division champions
- Rangers

First Division champions
- Morton

Second Division champions
- Clyde

Scottish Cup winners
- Rangers

League Cup winners
- Rangers

Junior Cup winners
- Bonnyrigg Rose Athletic

Teams in Europe
- Aberdeen, Celtic, Dundee United, Rangers

Scotland national team
- 1978 BHC, 1978 World Cup qualification, 1978 World Cup
- ← 1976–77 1978–79 →

The 1977–78 season was the 105th season of competitive football in Scotland and the 81st season of Scottish league football. In the Scottish Premier League, the Rangers F.C. were champions. Notable events included the Scotland national football team qualifying for the 1978 FIFA World Cup.

== Scottish Premier Division ==
Pos	Team	Pld	W	D	L	GF	GA	GD	Pts	Qualification or relegation
1	Rangers (C)	36	24	7	5	76	39	+37	55	Qualification for the European Cup first round
2	Aberdeen	36	22	9	5	68	29	+39	53	Qualification for the Cup Winners' Cup first round
3	Dundee United	36	16	8	12	42	32	+10	40	Qualification for the UEFA Cup first round
4	Hibernian	36	15	7	14	51	43	+8	37	Qualification for the UEFA Cup first round
5	Celtic	36	15	6	15	63	54	+9	36	
6	Motherwell	36	13	7	16	45	52	−7	33	
7	Partick Thistle	36	14	5	17	52	62	−10	33	
8	St Mirren	36	11	8	17	52	63	−11	30	
9	Ayr United (R)	36	9	6	21	36	68	−32	24	Relegation to the 1978–79 Scottish First Division
10	Clydebank (R)	36	6	7	23	23	64	−41	19	Relegation to the 1978–79 Scottish First Division

Source: Statto
Rules for classification: 1) points; 2) goal difference; 3) number of goals scored.
(C) Champions; (R) Relegated

Champions: Rangers
Relegated: Ayr United, Clydebank

== Scottish League First Division ==
Pos	Team	Pld	W	D	L	GF	GA	GD	Pts	Promotion or relegation
1	Morton (C, P)	39	25	8	6	85	42	+43	58	Promotion to the Premier Division
2	Heart of Midlothian (P)	39	24	10	5	77	42	+35	58	Promotion to the Premier Division
3	Dundee	39	25	7	7	91	44	+47	57	
4	Dumbarton	39	16	17	6	65	48	+17	49	
5	Stirling Albion	39	15	12	12	60	52	+8	42	
6	Kilmarnock	39	14	12	13	52	46	+6	40	
7	Hamilton Academical	39	12	12	15	54	56	−2	36	
8	St Johnstone	39	15	6	18	52	64	−12	36	
9	Arbroath	39	11	13	15	42	55	−13	35	
10	Airdrieonians	39	12	10	17	50	64	−14	34	
11	Montrose	39	10	9	20	55	71	−16	29	
12	Queen of the South	39	8	13	18	44	68	−24	29	
13	Alloa Athletic (R)	39	8	8	23	44	84	−40	24	Relegation to the Second Division
14	East Fife (R)	39	4	11	24	39	74	−35	19	Relegation to the Second Division

Source: RSSSF and statto
Rules for classification: 1) points; 2) goal difference; 3) number of goals scored.
(C) Champions; (P) Promoted; (R) Relegated

Promoted: Morton, Hearts
Relegated: Alloa, East Fife

== Scottish League Second Division ==
Pos	Team	Pld	W	D	L	GF	GA	GD	Pts	Promotion
1	Clyde (C, P)	39	21	11	7	71	32	+39	53	Promotion to the First Division
2	Raith Rovers (P)	39	19	15	5	63	34	+29	53	Promotion to the First Division
3	Dunfermline Ath	39	18	12	9	64	41	+23	48	
4	Berwick Rangers	39	16	16	7	68	51	+17	48	
5	Falkirk	39	15	14	10	51	46	+5	44	
6	Forfar Athletic	39	17	8	14	61	55	+6	42	
7	Queen's Park	39	13	15	11	52	51	+1	41	
8	Albion Rovers	39	16	8	15	68	68	0	40	
9	East Stirlingshire	39	15	8	16	55	65	−10	38	
10	Cowdenbeath	39	13	8	18	75	78	−3	34	
11	Stranraer	39	13	7	19	54	63	−9	33	
12	Stenhousemuir	39	10	10	19	43	67	−24	30	
13	Meadowbank Thistle	39	6	10	23	43	89	−46	22	
14	Brechin City	39	7	6	26	45	73	−28	20	

Source: "1977-1978 Second Division - SPFL Archive". SPFL.
Rules for classification: 1) points; 2) goal difference; 3) number of goals scored.
(C) Champions; (P) Promoted

Promoted: Clyde, Raith Rovers

== Cup honours ==
Competition	Winner	Score	Runner-up
Scottish Cup 1977–78	Rangers	2–1	Aberdeen
League Cup 1977–78	Rangers	2 – 1 (a.e.t.)	Celtic
Junior Cup	Bonnyrigg Rose Athletic	1–0	Stonehouse Violet

== Other Honours ==
=== National ===
Competition	Winner	Score	Runner-up
Scottish Qualifying Cup – North	Peterhead	2–0	Inverness Thistle
Scottish Qualifying Cup – South	Gala Fairydean	3 – 2 * †	Vale of Leithen

=== County ===
Competition	Winner	Score	Runner-up
Aberdeenshire Cup	Keith		
Ayrshire Cup	Ayr United	2–1	Kilmarnock
East of Scotland Shield	Hibernian	4–0	Meadowbank Thistle
Fife Cup	Dunfermline Athletic	2–0	Cowdenbeath
Renfrewshire Cup	Morton	1 – 1 ‡	St Mirren
Stirlingshire Cup	Stirling Albion	4–1	Clydebank

^{*} – aggregate over two legs
† – play off
‡ – won on penalties

=== Highland League ===
Top Three
Pos	Team	Pld	W	D	L	GF	GA	GD	Pts
1	Inverness Caledonian	30	23	3	4	85	40	+45	49
2	Peterhead	30	22	3	5	85	33	+52	47
3	Ross County	30	19	7	4	73	41	+32	45

== Individual honours ==
Award	Winner	Club
Footballer of the Year	(Scotland) Derek Johnstone	Rangers
Players' Player of the Year	(Scotland) Derek Johnstone	Rangers
Young Player of the Year	(Scotland) Graeme Payne	Dundee United

== Scottish national team ==
Date	Venue	Opponents	Score	Competition	Scotland scorer(s)
7 September 1977	Stadion der Weltjugend, East Berlin (A)	East Germany	0–1	Friendly	
21 September 1977	Hampden Park, Glasgow (H)	Czechoslovakia	3–1	WCQG7	Joe Jordan, Asa Hartford, Kenny Dalglish
12 October 1977	Anfield, Liverpool (A)	Wales	2–0	WCQG7	Don Masson (pen.), Kenny Dalglish
22 February 1978	Hampden Park, Glasgow (H)	Bulgaria	2–1	Friendly	Archie Gemmill (pen.), Ian Wallace
13 May 1978	Hampden Park, Glasgow (H)	Northern Ireland	1–1	BHC	Derek Johnstone
17 May 1978	Hampden Park, Glasgow (H)	Wales	1–1	BHC	Derek Johnstone
20 May 1978	Hampden Park, Glasgow (H)	England	0–1	BHC	
3 June 1978	Córdoba (N)	Peru	1–3	WCG4	Joe Jordan
7 June 1978	Córdoba (N)	Iran	1–1	WCG4	own goal
11 June 1978	Estadio San Martin, Mendoza (N)	Netherlands	3–2	WCG4	Archie Gemmill (2, 1 pen.), Kenny Dalglish

1978 British Home Championship – Third Place

Key:

- (H) = Home match
- (A) = Away match
- WCQG7 = World Cup qualifying – Group 7
- WCG4 = World Cup – Group 4
- BHC = British Home Championship
