= 1982–83 in Scottish football =

Premier Division champions
- Dundee United

Division One champions
- St Johnstone

Division Two champions
- Brechin City

Scottish Cup winners
- Aberdeen

League Cup winners
- Celtic

Junior Cup winners
- East Kilbride Thistle

Teams in Europe
- Aberdeen, Celtic, Dundee United, Rangers

Scotland national team
- 1983 BHC, UEFA Euro 1984 qualifying
- ← 1981–82 1983–84 →

The 1982–83 season was the 86th season of competitive football in Scotland.

== Overview ==
In a tightly fought contest Dundee United won their maiden Scottish league title. The league remained undecided until the last day of the season with Aberdeen, Celtic and Dundee United in contention. On the final day Celtic beat Rangers 4–2 and Aberdeen beat Hibernian 5–0, Dundee United held their nerve to win a historic first championship after beating local rivals Dundee 2–1 at Dens Park.

== Scottish League Premier Division ==
Pos	Team	Pld	W	D	L	GF	GA	GD	Pts	Qualification or relegation
1	Dundee United (C)	36	24	8	4	90	35	+55	56	Qualification for the European Cup first round
2	Celtic	36	25	5	6	90	36	+54	55	Qualification for the UEFA Cup first round
3	Aberdeen	36	25	5	6	76	25	+51	55	Qualification for the Cup Winners' Cup first round
4	Rangers	36	13	12	11	53	41	+12	38	Qualification for the Cup Winners' Cup first round
5	St Mirren	36	11	12	13	47	51	−4	34	Qualification for the UEFA Cup first round
6	Dundee	36	9	11	16	42	53	−11	29	
7	Hibernian	36	7	15	14	35	51	−16	29	
8	Motherwell	36	11	5	20	39	73	−34	27	
9	Morton (R)	36	6	8	22	36	81	−45	20	Relegation to the 1983–84 Scottish First Division
10	Kilmarnock (R)	36	3	11	22	28	91	−63	17	Relegation to the 1983–84 Scottish First Division

Source: Statto
Rules for classification: 1) points; 2) goal difference; 3) number of goals scored.
(C) Champions; (R) Relegated

Champions: Dundee United
Relegated: Morton, Kilmarnock

== Scottish League Division One ==
Pos	Team	Pld	W	D	L	GF	GA	GD	Pts	Promotion or relegation
1	St Johnstone (C, P)	39	25	5	9	59	37	+22	55	Promotion to the Premier Division
2	Heart of Midlothian (P)	39	22	10	7	79	38	+41	54	Promotion to the Premier Division
3	Clydebank	39	20	10	9	72	49	+23	50	
4	Partick Thistle	39	20	9	10	66	45	+21	49	
5	Airdrieonians	39	16	7	16	62	46	+16	39	
6	Alloa Athletic	39	14	11	14	52	52	0	39	
7	Dumbarton	39	13	10	16	50	59	−9	36	
8	Falkirk	39	15	6	18	45	55	−10	36	
9	Raith Rovers	39	13	8	18	64	63	+1	34	
10	Clyde	39	14	6	19	55	66	−11	34	
11	Hamilton Academical	39	11	12	16	54	66	−12	34	
12	Ayr United	39	12	8	19	45	61	−16	32	
13	Dunfermline Athletic (R)	39	7	17	15	39	69	−30	31	Relegation to the Second Division
14	Queen's Park (R)	39	6	11	22	44	80	−36	23	Relegation to the Second Division

Source: RSSSF
Rules for classification: 1) points; 2) goal difference; 3) number of goals scored.
(C) Champions; (P) Promoted; (R) Relegated

Promoted: St. Johnstone, Hearts
Relegated: Dunfermline Athletic, Queen's Park

== Scottish League Division Two ==
Pos	Team	Pld	W	D	L	GF	GA	GD	Pts	Promotion
1	Brechin City (C, P)	39	21	13	5	77	38	+39	55	Promotion to the First Division
2	Meadowbank Thistle (P)	39	23	8	8	64	45	+19	54	Promotion to the First Division
3	Arbroath	39	21	7	11	78	51	+27	49	
4	Forfar Athletic	39	18	12	9	58	38	+20	48	
5	Stirling Albion	39	18	10	11	57	41	+16	46	
6	East Fife	39	16	11	12	68	43	+25	43	
7	Queen of the South	39	17	8	14	75	55	+20	42	
8	Cowdenbeath	39	13	12	14	54	53	+1	38	
9	Berwick Rangers	39	13	10	16	47	60	−13	36	
10	Albion Rovers	39	14	6	19	55	66	−11	34	
11	Stenhousemuir	39	7	15	17	43	66	−23	29	
12	Stranraer	39	10	7	22	46	79	−33	27	
13	East Stirlingshire	39	7	9	23	41	79	−38	23	
14	Montrose	39	8	6	25	37	86	−49	22	

Source: "1982-1983 Second Division - SPFL Archive". SPFL.
Rules for classification: 1) points; 2) goal difference; 3) number of goals scored.
(C) Champions; (P) Promoted

Promoted: Brechin City, Meadowbank Thistle

== Other honours ==
=== Cup honours ===
Competition	Winner	Score	Runner-up	Report
Scottish Cup 1982–83	Aberdeen	1–0 (a.e.t.)	Rangers	Wikipedia article
League Cup 1982–83	Celtic	2–1	Rangers	
Junior Cup	East Kilbride Thistle	2–0	Bo'ness United	

=== Individual honours ===
Award	Winner	Club
Footballer of the Year	(Scotland) Charlie Nicholas	Celtic
Players' Player of the Year	(Scotland) Charlie Nicholas	Celtic
Young Player of the Year	(Scotland) Paul McStay	Celtic

== Scottish national team ==
Date	Venue	Opponents	Score	Competition	Scotland scorer(s)
13 October 1982	Hampden Park, Glasgow (H)	East Germany	2–0	ECQG1	John Wark, Graeme Souness
17 November 1982	Wankdorf Stadion, Bern (A)	Switzerland	0–2	ECQG1	
15 December 1982	Heysel Stadion, Brussels (A)	Belgium	2–3	ECQG1	Kenny Dalglish (2)
30 March 1983	Hampden Park, Glasgow (H)	Switzerland	2–2	ECQG1	John Wark, Charlie Nicholas
24 May 1983	Hampden Park, Glasgow (H)	Northern Ireland	0–0	BHC	
28 May 1983	Ninian Park, Cardiff (A)	Wales	2–0	BHC	Andy Gray, Alan Brazil
1 June 1983	Wembley Stadium, London (A)	England	0–2	BHC	
12 June 1983	Empire Stadium, Vancouver (A)	Canada	2–0	Friendly	Gordon Strachan (pen.), Mark McGhee
16 June 1983	Commonwealth Stadium, Edmonton (A)	Canada	3–0	Friendly	Charlie Nicholas, Richard Gough, Graeme Souness
19 June 1983	Varsity Stadium, Toronto (A)	Canada	2–0	Friendly	Andy Gray (2)

Key:

- (H) = Home match
- (A) = Away match
- ECQG1 = European Championship qualifying – Group 1
- BHC = British Home Championship

== See also ==
1982–83 Aberdeen F.C. season
