= 1987–88 Dundee United F.C. season =

Dundee United
1987–88 season
- Chairman: George Fox
- Manager: Jim McLean
- Stadium: Tannadice Park
- Premier Division: Fifth place
- Scottish Cup: Runners-up
- League Cup: Quarter-finals
- UEFA Cup: Second round
- Top goalscorer: League: Iain Ferguson (11); All: Iain Ferguson (16)
- Highest home attendance: 20,846 vs. Rangers, Premier Division, 27 February 1988
- Lowest home attendance: 5,703 vs. Motherwell, Premier Division, 12 December 1987
Home colours	Away colours

The 1987–88 season was the 79th year of football played by Dundee United, and covers the period from 1 July 1987 to 30 June 1988. United finished in fifth place, securing UEFA Cup Winners' Cup football for the following season, despite their Scottish Cup final defeat to Celtic (Celtic qualified for European competition as league winners).

== Summary ==
Dundee United played a total of 60 competitive matches during the 1987–88 season. The team finished fifth in the Scottish Premier Division.

In the cup competitions, United lost in the final of the Scottish Cup to Celtic and lost in the Scottish League Cup quarter-finals to rivals Dundee. Czechoslovak side Vítkovice ensured United wouldn't repeat last season's UEFA Cup run, beating them in the second round.

The club signed three players during the season with a total public cost of at least £200,000 (one figure unknown). Four players were sold by the club during the season with a public total of at least £80,000 (some figures unavailable).

The jerseys were sponsored by Belhaven Brewery for the first time.

== Fixtures and results ==
All results are written with Dundee United's score first.

=== Scottish Premier Division ===
Date	Opponent	Venue	Result	Attendance	Scorers
8 August 1987	Rangers	A	1–1	39,120	Beaumont
12 August 1987	Motherwell	H	1–1	6,633	Redford
15 August 1987	Greenock Morton	H	3–1	6,641	McInally, Redford, Sturrock
22 August 1987	Heart of Midlothian	A	1–4	14,548	Ferguson
29 August 1987	Aberdeen	A	1–1	16,000	Redford
5 September 1987	Celtic	H	0–0	16,192	
12 September 1987	Hibernian	H	1–2	7,920	Hegarty
19 September 1987	St Mirren	A	0–2	3,807	
26 September 1987	Falkirk	H	3–0	6,240	G McLeod, Sturrock (2)
3 October 1987	Dundee	A	1–1	11,497	Ferguson
6 October 1987	Dunfermline Athletic	A	0–0	7,558	
10 October 1987	Rangers	H	1–0	18,214	Ferguson
17 October 1987	Aberdeen	H	0–0	11,281	
24 October 1987	Celtic	A	2–1	31,032	Ferguson, Clark
28 October 1987	Hibernian	A	1–0	9,250	McKinlay
31 October 1987	St Mirren	H	2–3	7,607	Ferguson, Paatelainen
7 November 1987	Motherwell	A	1–2	2,927	Ferguson
14 November 1987	Dunfermline Athletic	H	1–0	8,699	Paatelainen
18 November 1987	Heart of Midlothian	H	0–3	14,258	
21 November 1987	Greenock Morton	A	1–0	3,000	Ferguson
24 November 1987	Falkirk	A	1–4	4,000	G McLeod
28 November 1987	Dundee	H	1–3	13,625	Clark
5 December 1987	Rangers	A	0–1	41,159	
12 December 1987	Motherwell	H	3–1	5,703	G McLeod, Paatelainen, Ferguson
16 December 1987	Hibernian	H	1–2	6,095	Ferguson
19 December 1987	St Mirren	A	1–2	3,517	McPhee
26 December 1987	Celtic	H	1–0	18,458	French
2 January 1988	Aberdeen	A	0–0	21,500	
9 January 1988	Falkirk	H	0–0	6,617	
16 January 1988	Dundee	A	2–0	13,651	Bannon, Paatelainen
3 February 1988	Heart of Midlothian	A	1–1	13,710	Redford
6 February 1988	Greenock Morton	H	2–0	6,566	Redford (2)
13 February 1988	Dunfermline Athletic	A	3–0	7,159	Gallacher (3)
27 February 1988	Rangers	H	1–1	20,846	Paatelainen
5 March 1988	Hibernian	A	0–0	8,401	
19 March 1988	Aberdeen	H	0–2	10,403	
26 March 1988	Celtic	A	0–0	34,933	
30 March 1988	St Mirren	H	5–1	6,294	Bowman, Ferguson, French, Irvine (2)
2 April 1988	Dundee	H	1–0	13,874	French
16 April 1988	Motherwell	A	2–4	3,822	Clark, J McLeod
23 April 1988	Dunfermline Athletic	H	2–2	8,263	McInally, Ferguson
30 April 1988	Greenock Morton	A	4–0	2,000	Paatelainen (4)
4 May 1988	Falkirk	A	2–1	4,500	Welsh, Gallacher
7 May 1988	Heart of Midlothian	H	0–0	9,820	

=== Scottish Cup ===
Date	Round	Opponent	Venue	Result	Attendance	Scorers
30 January 1988	Third round	Arbroath	A	7–0	5,905	Malpas, Bannon, Irvine (2), Paatelainen; French, Redford
20 February 1988	Fourth round	Airdrieonians	A	2–0	6,727	Hegarty, Bannon
12 March 1988	Quarter–finals	Dundee	A	0–0	19,355	
15 March 1988	Quarter–finals replay	Dundee	H	2–2	17,055	Bannon (2)
28 March 1988	Quarter–finals 2nd replay	Dundee	A	3–0	19,152	Redford, Ferguson, McLeod
9 April 1988	Semi–finals	Aberdeen	N	0–0	20,488	
13 April 1988	Semi–finals replay	Aberdeen	N	1–1	17,288	Paatelainen
20 April 1988	Semi–finals 2nd replay	Aberdeen	N	1–0	19,048	Ferguson
14 May 1988	Final	Celtic	N	1–2	74,000	Gallacher

=== Scottish League Cup ===
Date	Round	Opponent	Venue	Result	Attendance	Scorers
19 August 1987	Second round	Partick Thistle	H	2–0	6,075	McPhee, Ferguson, Gallacher, Sturrock
25 August 1987	Third round	Raith Rovers	A	2–1	6,500	Sturrock, Malpas
2 September 1987	Quarter–finals	Dundee	A	1–2	19,817	Ferguson

=== UEFA Cup ===
Date	Round	Opponent	Venue	Result	Attendance	Scorers
16 September 1987	First round 1st leg	(Northern Ireland) Coleraine	A	1–0	6,500	Sturrock
30 September 1987	First round 2nd leg	(Northern Ireland) Coleraine	H	3–1	8,430	Clark, Gallacher, Sturrock
21 October 1987	Second round 1st leg	(Czech Republic) Vítkovice	H	1–2	8,938	Ferguson
4 November 1987	Second round 2nd leg	(Czech Republic) Vítkovice	A	1–1	12,549	Clark

== Player statistics ==
During the 1987–88 season, United used 31 different players comprising four nationalities. Maurice Malpas featured in all but one of United's 60 matches. The table below shows the number of appearances and goals scored by each player.

No.	Pos	Nat	Player	Total		Premier Division		Scottish Cup		League Cup		Cup Winners' Cup	
No.	Pos	Nat	Player	Apps	Goals	Apps	Goals	Apps	Goals	Apps	Goals	Apps	Goals
	GK	(Scotland) SCO	Alan Main	10	0	8	0	2	0	0	0	0	0
	GK	(Scotland) SCO	Billy Thomson	50	0	36	0	7	0	3	0	4	0
	DF	(Scotland) SCO	Dave Beaumont	11	1	9	1	0	0	0	0	2	0
	DF	(Scotland) SCO	John Clark	37	5	27	3	7	0	0	0	3	2
	DF	(Scotland) SCO	Alex Cleland	1	0	1	0	0	0	0	0	0	0
	DF	(Scotland) SCO	Paul Hegarty	57	2	41	1	9	1	3	0	4	0
	DF	(Scotland) SCO	John Holt	9	0	6	0	0	0	3	0	0	0
	DF	(Scotland) SCO	Gary McGinnis	15	0	10	0	1	0	0	0	4	0
	DF	(Scotland) SCO	Maurice Malpas	59	2	44	0	8	1	3	1	4	0
	DF	(Scotland) SCO	Dave Narey	54	0	39	0	9	0	3	0	3	0
	DF	(Scotland) SCO	Brian Welsh	1	1	1	1	0	0	0	0	0	0
	MF	(Scotland) SCO	Eamonn Bannon	40	5	26	1	9	4	2	0	3	0
	MF	(Scotland) SCO	Dave Bowman	51	1	38	1	8	0	2	0	3	0
	MF	(Scotland) SCO	Harry Curran	6	0	6	0	0	0	0	0	0	0
	MF	(Scotland) SCO	Alan Irvine	19	4	16	2	1	2	1	0	1	0
	MF	(Scotland) SCO	Paul Kinnaird	13	0	11	0	0	0	0	0	2	0
	MF	(Scotland) SCO	Billy Kirkwood	1	1	1	0	0	1	0	0	0	0
	MF	(Scotland) SCO	Jim McInally	46	2	36	2	9	0	0	0	1	0
	MF	(Scotland) SCO	Billy McKinlay	13	1	12	1	0	0	0	0	1	0
	MF	(Scotland) SCO	Gordon McLeod	13	3	12	3	0	0	0	0	1	0
	MF	(Scotland) SCO	Joe McLeod	14	2	10	1	3	1	0	0	1	0
	MF	(Scotland) SCO	Ian McPhee	14	2	10	1	3	0	1	1	0	0
	MF	(Scotland) SCO	Allan Preston	2	0	2	0	0	0	0	0	0	0
	MF	(Scotland) SCO	Ian Redford	38	8	25	6	8	2	3	0	2	0
	FW	(Scotland) SCO	Iain Ferguson	52	16	38	11	8	2	3	2	3	1
	FW	(Scotland) SCO	Hamish French	26	4	20	3	5	1	0	0	1	0
	FW	(Scotland) SCO	Kevin Gallacher	36	8	26	3	8	3	1	2	1	0
	FW	(Scotland) SCO	Alan Irvine	8	0	7	0	0	0	1	0	0	0
	FW	(Finland) FIN	Mixu Paatelainen	27	11	19	9	8	2	0	0	0	0
	FW	(Scotland) SCO	Paul Sturrock	15	7	9	3	0	0	3	2	3	2

=== Goalscorers ===
United had 19 players score with the team scoring 83 goals in total. The top goalscorer was Iain Ferguson, who finished the season with 16 goals.

Name	League	Cups	Total
Iain Ferguson	11	5	16
Mixu Paatelainen	9	2	11
Ian Redford	6	2	8
Paul Sturrock	3	4	7
Kevin Gallacher	3	3	6
John Clark	3	2	5
Eamonn Bannon	1	4	5
Hamish French	3	1	4
Alan Irvine	2	2	4
Gordon McLeod	3	0	3
Own goals	3	0	3
Jim McInally	2	0	2
Paul Hegarty	1	1	2
Joe McLeod	1	1	2
Ian McPhee	1	1	2
Maurice Malpas	0	2	2
Dave Beaumont	1	0	1
Dave Bowman	1	0	1
Billy McKinlay	1	0	1
Brian Welsh	1	0	1

=== Discipline ===
During the 1987–88 season, two United players were sent off. Statistics for cautions are unavailable.

Name	Dismissals
Paul Hegarty	(red card) 1
Maurice Malpas	(red card) 1

== Competitions ==
=== League table ===
Pos	Team	Pld	W	D	L	GF	GA	GD	Pts	Qualification or relegation
3	Rangers	44	26	8	10	85	34	+51	60	Qualification for the UEFA Cup first round
4	Aberdeen	44	21	17	6	56	25	+31	59	Qualification for the UEFA Cup first round
5	Dundee United	44	16	15	13	54	47	+7	47	Qualification for the Cup Winners' Cup first round
6	Hibernian	44	12	19	13	41	42	−1	43	
7	Dundee	44	17	7	20	70	64	+6	41	

Source: Statto
Rules for classification: 1) points; 2) goal difference; 3) number of goals scored.

== Transfers ==
=== In ===
Date	Player	From	Fee
August 1987	(Scotland) Ian McPhee	(Scotland) Forfar Athletic	Unknown
August 1987	(Scotland) Alan Irvine	(England) Liverpool	£100,000
30 October 1987	(Finland) Mixu Paatelainen	(Finland) FC Haka	£100,000

=== Out ===
Date	Player	To	Fee
September 1987	(Scotland) John Holt	(Scotland) Dunfermline Athletic	Unknown
September 1987	(Scotland) Billy Kirkwood	(Scotland) Dunfermline Athletic	Unknown
11 February 1988	(Scotland) Alan Irvine	(England) Shrewsbury Town	£80,000
February 1988	(Scotland) Paul Kinnaird	(Scotland) Motherwell	Unknown

== See also ==
- 1987–88 in Scottish football
