= 1988–89 Dundee United F.C. season =

Dundee United
1988–89 season
- Chairman: Jim McLean
- Manager: Jim McLean
- Stadium: Tannadice Park
- Premier Division: Fourth place
- Scottish Cup: Quarter-finals
- League Cup: Semi-finals
- Cup Winners' Cup: Second round
- Top goalscorer: League: Mixu Paatelainen (10); All: Mixu Paatelainen (17)
- Highest home attendance: 20,071 vs. Rangers, Premier Division, 27 September 1988
- Lowest home attendance: 5,957 vs. St Mirren, Premier Division, 17 February 1989
Home colours	Away colours

The 1988–89 season was the 80th year of football played by Dundee United, and covers the period from 1 July 1988 to 30 June 1989. United finished in fourth place, securing UEFA Cup football for the following season. The season would mark the beginning of Jim McLean's tenure as both manager and club chairman.

== Summary ==
Dundee United played a total of 50 competitive matches during the 1988–89 season. The team finished fourth in the Scottish Premier Division.

In the cup competitions, United lost in the quarter-finals of the Scottish Cup to eventual runners-up Rangers and lost in the Scottish League Cup semi-finals to Aberdeen, who also finished as losers in the final. Romanian side Dinamo București knocked United out of the Cup Winners' Cup in the second round.

The club signed four players during the season with a total public cost of at least £450,000 (one figure unknown). Seven players were sold by the club during the season with a public total of at least £1.1m (some figures unavailable). One player also retired.

The club's playing kits were sponsored by Belhaven Brewery for a second season.

All four of United's matches against Heart of Midlothian finished 0–0.

== Fixtures and results ==
All results are written with Dundee United's score first.

=== Scottish Premier Division ===
Date	Opponent	Venue	Result	Attendance	Scorers
13 August 1988	St Mirren	A	1–0	5,832	Clark
20 August 1988	Celtic	H	1–0	18,769	Gallacher
27 August 1988	Aberdeen	H	2–2	13,128	Clark, Meade
3 September 1988	Dundee	A	3–0	14,927	Paatelainen (2), Gallacher
17 September 1988	Hibernian	H	1–1	11,017	Paatelainen
24 September 1988	Motherwell	A	2–1	3,559	Redford (2)
27 September 1988	Rangers	H	0–1	20,071	
1 October 1988	Heart of Midlothian	H	0–0	10,838	
8 October 1988	Hamilton Academical	A	4–0	3,538	Meade, Paatelainen (2), McPhee
12 October 1988	Celtic	A	0–1	36,870	
22 October 1988	St Mirren	H	0–1	7,618	
29 October 1988	Motherwell	H	1–1	6,266	Paatelainen
2 November 1988	Hibernian	A	1–1	10,000	Meade
5 November 1988	Dundee	H	2–0	14,882	Meade, Paatelainen
12 November 1988	Aberdeen	A	1–1	15,000	Preston
19 November 1988	Heart of Midlothian	A	0–0	10,121	
26 November 1988	Hamilton Academical	H	1–0	6,357	Bowman
3 December 1988	Rangers	A	1–0	39,200	Beaumont
10 December 1988	Hibernian	H	4–1	9,963	Mitchell, French, Gallacher, McKinlay
17 December 1988	Celtic	H	2–0	18,745	Paatelainen, Baillie
31 December 1988	St Mirren	A	1–0	7,762	Gallacher
3 January 1989	Aberdeen	H	1–1	17,952	French
7 January 1989	Dundee	A	1–0	16,332	French
14 January 1989	Hamilton Academical	A	5–0	4,000	McInally, Gallacher (3), Paatelainen
21 January 1989	Heart of Midlothian	H	0–0	13,674	
11 February 1989	Rangers	H	1–1	20,013	Stevens
11 March 1989	St Mirren	H	1–4	8,320	Malpas
14 March 1989	Motherwell	A	2–1	3,545	Krivokapic, Gallacher
25 March 1989	Celtic	A	0–1	36,870	
1 April 1989	Aberdeen	A	0–1	16,700	
8 April 1989	Dundee	H	2–1	11,910	Sturrock, Gallacher
22 April 1989	Motherwell	H	1–1	6,301	Hegarty
29 April 1989	Hibernian	A	2–1	7,700	Irvine, Paatelainen
2 May 1989	Rangers	A	0–2	39,058	
6 May 1989	Heart of Midlothian	A	0–0	8,613	
13 May 1989	Hamilton Academical	H	0–1	11,503	

=== Scottish Cup ===
Date	Round	Opponent	Venue	Result	Attendance	Scorers
28 January 1989	Third round	Dundee	A	2–1	18,117	Bowman, Meade
18 February 1989	Fourth round	Aberdeen	A	1–1	23,600	Paatelainen
22 February 1989	Fourth round replay	Aberdeen	H	1–1	18,756	Paatelainen
27 February 1989	Fourth round 2nd replay	Aberdeen	H	1–0	21,095	Paatelainen
21 March 1989	Quarter–finals	Rangers	A	2–2	42,177	Gallacher, Paatelainen
27 March 1989	Quarter–finals replay	Rangers	H	0–1	21,872	

=== Scottish League Cup ===
Date	Round	Opponent	Venue	Result	Attendance	Scorers
16 August 1988	Second round	Partick Thistle	A	2–0	4,500	Paatelainen (2)
24 August 1988	Third round	St Mirren	A	3–1	5,970	Paatelainen, Gallacher, Meade
31 August 1988	Quarter–finals	Celtic	H	2–0	21,178	Gallacher, Redford
20 September 1988	Semi–finals	Aberdeen	N	0–2	18,481	

=== UEFA Cup Winners' Cup ===
Date	Round	Opponent	Venue	Result	Attendance	Scorers
6 September 1988	First round 1st leg	(Malta) Floriana	A	0–0	4,000	
5 October 1988	First round 2nd leg	(Malta) Floriana	H	1–0	9,138	Meade
26 October 1988	Second round 1st leg	(Romania) Dinamo București	H	1–1	10,594	Beaumont
9 November 1988	Second round 2nd leg	(Romania) Dinamo București	A	0–1	18,000	

== Player statistics ==
During the 1988–89 season, United used 31 different players comprising four nationalities. Maurice Malpas was the only player to play in every match. The table below shows the number of appearances and goals scored by each player.

No.	Pos	Nat	Player	Total		Premier Division		Scottish Cup		League Cup		Cup Winners' Cup	
No.	Pos	Nat	Player	Apps	Goals	Apps	Goals	Apps	Goals	Apps	Goals	Apps	Goals
	GK	(Scotland) SCO	Billy Thomson	49	0	35	0	6	0	4	0	4	0
	GK	(Scotland) SCO	Scott Y. Thomson	1	0	1	0	0	0	0	0	0	0
	DF	(Scotland) SCO	Dave Beaumont	22	3	18	1	0	0	2	1	2	1
	DF	(Scotland) SCO	John Clark	30	2	20	2	4	0	3	0	3	0
	DF	(Scotland) SCO	Alex Cleland	12	0	9	0	0	0	2	0	1	0
	DF	(Scotland) SCO	Paul Hegarty	41	1	29	1	6	0	2	0	4	0
	DF	(Socialist Federal Republic of Yugoslavia) YUG	Miodrag Krivokapić	29	1	22	1	6	0	1	0	0	0
	DF	(Scotland) SCO	Gary McGinnis	16	0	11	0	4	0	1	0	0	0
	DF	(Scotland) SCO	Maurice Malpas	50	1	36	1	6	0	4	0	4	0
	DF	(Scotland) SCO	Dave Narey	46	0	33	0	6	0	4	0	3	0
	DF	(Scotland) SCO	Brian Welsh	1	0	1	0	0	0	0	0	0	0
	MF	(Scotland) SCO	Charlie Adam	6	0	6	0	0	0	0	0	0	0
	MF	(Scotland) SCO	Dave Bowman	39	2	28	1	3	1	4	0	4	0
	MF	(Scotland) SCO	Harry Curran	6	0	6	0	0	0	0	0	0	0
	MF	(Scotland) SCO	Alan Irvine	7	3	7	1	0	1	0	1	0	0
	MF	(Scotland) SCO	Jim McInally	40	1	29	1	6	0	2	0	3	0
	MF	(Scotland) SCO	Billy McKinlay	41	1	30	1	4	0	4	0	3	0
	MF	(Scotland) SCO	Ray McKinnon	1	0	1	0	0	0	0	0	0	0
	MF	(Scotland) SCO	Gordon McLeod	1	0	1	0	0	0	0	0	0	0
	MF	(Scotland) SCO	Joe McLeod	5	0	3	0	2	0	0	0	0	0
	MF	(Scotland) SCO	Ian McPhee	5	1	2	1	0	0	1	0	2	0
	MF	(Scotland) SCO	John O'Neil	1	0	1	0	0	0	0	0	0	0
	MF	(Scotland) SCO	Allan Preston	10	1	8	1	0	0	0	0	2	0
	MF	(Scotland) SCO	Ian Redford	15	3	9	2	0	0	3	1	3	0
	FW	(Scotland) SCO	Paddy Connolly	2	0	2	0	0	0	0	0	0	0
	FW	(Scotland) SCO	Hamish French	25	3	18	3	2	0	3	0	2	0
	FW	(Scotland) SCO	Kevin Gallacher	44	12	31	9	5	1	4	2	4	0
	FW	(England) ENG	Raphael Meade	22	7	11	4	4	1	3	1	4	1
	FW	(Scotland) SCO	Darren Jackson	1	0	1	0	0	0	0	0	0	0
	FW	(Finland) FIN	Mixu Paatelainen	45	17	33	10	6	4	3	3	3	0
	FW	(Scotland) SCO	Paul Sturrock	14	1	9	1	5	0	0	0	0	0

=== Goalscorers ===
United had 17 players score with the team scoring 60 goals in total. The top goalscorer was Mixu Paatelainen, who finished the season with 17 goals.

Name	League	Cups	Total
Mixu Paatelainen	10	7	17
Kevin Gallacher	9	3	12
Raphael Meade	4	3	7
Hamish French	3	0	3
Ian Redford	2	1	3
Own goals	3	0	3
John Clark	2	0	2
Dave Beaumont	1	1	2
Dave Bowman	1	1	2
Paul Hegarty	1	0	1
Alan Irvine	1	0	1
Miodrag Krivokapic	1	0	1
Jim McInally	1	0	1
Billy McKinlay	1	0	1
Ian McPhee	1	0	1
Maurice Malpas	1	0	1
Allan Preston	1	0	1
Paul Sturrock	1	0	1

== Competitions ==
=== League table ===
Pos	Team	Pld	W	D	L	GF	GA	GD	Pts	Qualification or relegation
2	Aberdeen	36	18	14	4	51	25	+26	50	Qualification for the UEFA Cup first round
3	Celtic	36	21	4	11	66	44	+22	46	Qualification for the Cup Winners' Cup first round
4	Dundee United	36	16	12	8	44	26	+18	44	Qualification for the UEFA Cup first round
5	Hibernian	36	13	9	14	37	36	+1	35	Qualification for the UEFA Cup first round
6	Heart of Midlothian	36	9	13	14	35	42	−7	31	

Source: Statto
Rules for classification: 1) points; 2) goal difference; 3) number of goals scored.

== Transfers ==
=== In ===
Date	Player	From	Fee
3 August 1988	(Socialist Federal Republic of Yugoslavia) Miodrag Krivokapić	(Socialist Federal Republic of Yugoslavia) Red Star Belgrade	£250,000
3 August 1988	(England) Raphael Meade	(Portugal) Sporting CP	£150,000
16 December 1988	(Scotland) Darren Jackson	(England) Newcastle United	£200,000
April 1989	(Scotland) Charlie Adam	(Scotland) Brechin City	Unknown

=== Out ===
Date	Player	To	Fee
13 July 1988	(Scotland) Eamonn Bannon	(Scotland) Heart of Midlothian	£225,000
July 1988	(Scotland) Iain Ferguson	(Scotland) Heart of Midlothian	£320,000
November 1988	(Scotland) Ian McPhee	(Scotland) Airdrieonians	Unknown
14 November 1988	(Scotland) Ian Redford	(England) Ipswich Town	£200,000
16 November 1988	(Scotland) Gordon McLeod	(Scotland) Airdrieonians	£100,000
12 January 1989	(Scotland) Dave Beaumont	(England) Luton Town	£150,000
1989	(Scotland) Harry Curran	(Scotland) St Johnstone	Unknown
April 1989	(Scotland) Raphael Meade	(England) Luton Town	£150,000
13 May 1989	(Scotland) Paul Sturrock	Retired	

== See also ==
- 1988–89 in Scottish football
