= 1986–87 Dundee United F.C. season =

Dundee United
1986–87 season
- Chairman: George Fox
- Manager: Jim McLean
- Stadium: Tannadice Park
- Premier Division: Third place
- Scottish Cup: Runners-up
- League Cup: Semi-finals
- UEFA Cup: Runners-up
- Top goalscorer: League: Iain Ferguson (16); All: Iain Ferguson (28)
- Highest home attendance: 21,322 vs. Barcelona, UEFA Cup, 4 March 1987
- Lowest home attendance: 4,280 vs. Hamilton Academical, Premier Division, 19 November 1986
| Home colours | Away colours |

The 1986–87 season was the 78th year of football played by Dundee United, and covers the period from 1 July 1986 to 30 June 1987. United finished in third place, securing UEFA Cup football for the following season.

== Summary ==
Dundee United played a total of 67 competitive matches during the 1986–87 season. The team finished third in the Scottish Premier Division.

They reached the Scottish Cup final, only to lose after extra-time to St Mirren. The season is most notable for the club's run to the UEFA Cup Final, knocking out Barcelona, Borussia Mönchengladbach and Universitatea Craiova en route. United lost 2–1 on aggregate to IFK Göteborg in the final.

In the cup competitions, United lost in the final of the Scottish Cup to St Mirren and lost in the Scottish League Cup semi-finals. Swedish side IFK Göteborg defeated United in the final of the UEFA Cup over two legs.

The club signed five players during the season with a total public cost of at least £300,000 (some figures unknown). Two other players joined before the following season. Four players were sold by the club during the season with a public total of nearly £1,000,000. One player retired due to injury.

The club's playing kits were sponsored by future chairman Eddie Thompson's VG Foodstores for a second season.

== Results and fixtures ==
All results are written with Dundee United's score first.

=== Scottish Premier Division ===
| Date | Opponent | Venue | Result | Attendance | Scorers |
|---|---|---|---|---|---|
| 9 August 1986 | Aberdeen | H | 2–1 | 10,910 | Gough, Redford |
| 13 August 1986 | Clydebank | A | 0–0 | 1,612 | |
| 16 August 1986 | Rangers | A | 3–2 | 43,995 | Gallacher, Redford |
| 23 August 1986 | Heart of Midlothian | H | 1–0 | 11,068 | Hegarty |
| 30 August 1986 | St Mirren | H | 3–0 | 6,168 | Ferguson, Gallacher, Bannon |
| 6 September 1986 | Dundee | A | 2–0 | 12,079 | Milne, Bannon |
| 13 September 1986 | Celtic | H | 2–2 | 19,792 | Ferguson, Gallacher |
| 20 September 1986 | Hamilton Academical | A | 5–1 | 2,876 | Hegarty (2), Ferguson (2), Sturrock |
| 27 September 1986 | Hibernian | A | 1–1 | 5,407 | Redford |
| 4 October 1986 | Falkirk | H | 2–0 | 5,957 | Ferguson (2) |
| 8 October 1986 | Motherwell | H | 4–0 | 5,740 | Philliben, Ferguson, Wishart, Coyne |
| 11 October 1986 | Aberdeen | A | 0–2 | 14,922 | |
| 18 October 1986 | Clydebank | H | 2–0 | 5,314 | Auld, Bannon |
| 25 October 1986 | Heart of Midlothian | A | 2–2 | 14,320 | Sturrock (2) |
| 29 October 1986 | Rangers | H | 0–0 | 20,171 | |
| 1 November 1986 | St Mirren | A | 1–0 | 3,930 | Ferguson |
| 8 November 1986 | Dundee | H | 0–3 | 11,733 | |
| 15 November 1986 | Celtic | A | 0–1 | 34,319 | |
| 19 November 1986 | Hamilton Academical | H | 3–0 | 4,280 | Clark, Ferguson, Sturrock |
| 22 November 1986 | Hibernian | H | 1–0 | 6,862 | Bannon |
| 29 November 1986 | Falkirk | A | 1–2 | 4,500 | Redford |
| 3 December 1986 | Motherwell | A | 2–0 | 2,312 | Page, Redford |
| 6 December 1986 | Aberdeen | H | 0–0 | 10,242 | |
| 13 December 1986 | Clydebank | A | 2–1 | 1,396 | Ferguson, Bannon |
| 20 December 1986 | Heart of Midlothian | H | 3–1 | 11,749 | Sturrock, Bannon, Ferguson |
| 27 December 1986 | Rangers | A | 0–2 | 42,165 | |
| 6 January 1987 | St Mirren | H | 2–0 | 5,798 | Redford, Sturrock |
| 10 January 1987 | Celtic | H | 3–2 | 19,020 | Ferguson, Gallacher, Bannon |
| 24 January 1987 | Hibernian | A | 2–0 | 7,398 | Gallacher, McInally |
| 7 February 1987 | Falkirk | H | 2–1 | 8,804 | Ferguson, Gallacher |
| 14 February 1987 | Motherwell | H | 2–0 | 9,902 | Gallacher, Ferguson |
| 28 February 1987 | Aberdeen | A | 1–0 | 12,850 | Bannon |
| 7 March 1987 | Clydebank | H | 1–1 | 5,541 | Hegarty |
| 10 March 1987 | Dundee | A | 1–1 | 11,615 | Gallacher |
| 21 March 1987 | Rangers | H | 0–1 | 21,278 | |
| 28 March 1987 | Dundee | H | 1–1 | 12,220 | Glennie |
| 4 April 1987 | St Mirren | A | 1–2 | 2,538 | Redford |
| 14 April 1987 | Hamilton | A | 0–0 | 2,062 | |
| 18 April 1987 | Celtic | A | 1–1 | 23,798 | Clark |
| 25 April 1987 | Falkirk | A | 2–1 | 4,930 | Ferguson (2) |
| 28 April 1987 | Hamilton | H | 2–1 | 7,244 | Bannon, Clark |
| 2 May 1987 | Hibernian | H | 2–1 | 9,301 | Gallacher, Redford |
| 9 May 1987 | Motherwell | A | 0–1 | 2,340 | |
| 11 May 1987 | Heart of Midlothian | A | 1–1 | 6,779 | Kirkwood |

=== Scottish Cup ===
| Date | Round | Opponent | Venue | Result | Attendance | Scorers |
|---|---|---|---|---|---|---|
| 31 January 1987 | Third round | Airdrieonians | H | 1–1 | 9,169 | Gallacher |
| 9 February 1987 | Third round replay | Airdrieonians | A | 2–1 | 5,000 | Ferguson, Gallacher |
| 12 February 1987 | Fourth round | Brechin City | A | 1–0 | 19,355 | Gallacher |
| 14 March 1987 | Quarter-finals | Forfar Athletic | H | 2–2 | 7,985 | Malpas, Ferguson |
| 24 March 1987 | Quarter-finals replay | Forfar Athletic | A | 2–0 | 8,139 | Holt, Ferguson |
| 11 April 1987 | Semi-finals | Dundee | N | 3–2 | 13,913 | Ferguson (2), Hegarty |
| 16 May 1987 | Final | St Mirren | N | 0–1 | 51,782 | |

=== Scottish League Cup ===
| Date | Round | Opponent | Venue | Result | Attendance | Scorers |
|---|---|---|---|---|---|---|
| 20 August 1986 | Second round | Queen of the South | A | 1–0 | 4,212 | Gallacher |
| 27 August 1986 | Third round | Ayr United | A | 3–0 | 3,680 | Ferguson (2), Gallacher |
| 3 September 1986 | Quarter-finals | Hibernian | A | 2–0 | 9,212 | Ferguson (2) |
| 24 September 1986 | Semi-finals | Rangers | A | 1–2 | 45,249 | Ferguson |

=== UEFA Cup ===
| Date | Round | Opponent | Venue | Result | Attendance | Scorers |
|---|---|---|---|---|---|---|
| 17 September 1986 | First round 1st leg | (France) Lens | A | 0–1 | 11,330 | |
| 1 October 1986 | First round 2nd leg | (France) Lens | H | 2–0 | 11,645 | Milne, Coyne |
| 22 October 1986 | Second round 1st leg | (Romania) Universitatea Craiova | H | 3–0 | 10,728 | Redford (2), Clark |
| 5 November 1986 | Second round 2nd leg | (Romania) Universitatea Craiova | A | 0–1 | 35,000 | |
| 26 November 1986 | Third round 1st leg | (Socialist Federal Republic of Yugoslavia) Hajduk Split | H | 2–0 | 11,569 | McInally, Clark |
| 10 December 1986 | Third round 2nd leg | (Socialist Federal Republic of Yugoslavia) Hajduk Split | A | 0–0 | 26,000 | |
| 4 March 1987 | Quarter-finals 1st leg | (Spain) Barcelona | H | 1–0 | 21,322 | Gallacher |
| 18 March 1987 | Quarter-finals 2nd leg | (Spain) Barcelona | A | 2–1 | 42,000 | Clark, Ferguson |
| 8 April 1987 | Semi-finals 1st leg | (Germany) Borussia Mönchengladbach | H | 0–0 | 15,789 | |
| 22 April 1987 | Semi-finals 2nd leg | (Germany) Borussia Mönchengladbach | A | 2–0 | 33,500 | Ferguson, Redford |
| 6 May 1987 | Final 1st leg | (Sweden) IFK Göteborg | A | 0–1 | 50,053 | |
| 20 May 1987 | Final 2nd leg | (Sweden) IFK Göteborg | H | 1–1 | 20,911 | Clark |

== Player statistics ==
During the 1986–87 season, United used 29 different players comprising four nationalities. Billy Thomson was the only player to feature in every match of United's UEFA Cup run. The table below shows the number of appearances and goals scored by each player.

| No. | Pos | Nat | Player | Total | | Premier Division | | Scottish Cup | | League Cup | | UEFA Cup | |
| No. | Pos | Nat | Player | Apps | Goals | Apps | Goals | Apps | Goals | Apps | Goals | Apps | Goals |
|---|---|---|---|---|---|---|---|---|---|---|---|---|---|
| | GK | (Scotland) SCO | Alan Main | 3 | 0 | 2 | 0 | 1 | 0 | 0 | 0 | 0 | 0 |
| | GK | (Scotland) SCO | Billy Thomson | 61 | 0 | 39 | 0 | 6 | 0 | 4 | 0 | 12 | 0 |
| | GK | (Scotland) SCO | Scott Thomson | 3 | 0 | 3 | 0 | 0 | 0 | 0 | 0 | 0 | 0 |
| | DF | (Scotland) SCO | Dave Beaumont | 40 | 0 | 28 | 0 | 4 | 0 | 2 | 0 | 6 | 0 |
| | DF | (Scotland) SCO | John Clark | 47 | 7 | 30 | 3 | 6 | 0 | 1 | 0 | 10 | 4 |
| | DF | (Scotland) SCO | Richard Gough | 3 | 1 | 3 | 1 | 0 | 0 | 0 | 0 | 0 | 0 |
| | DF | (Scotland) SCO | Paul Hegarty | 38 | 5 | 23 | 4 | 4 | 1 | 4 | 0 | 7 | 0 |
| | DF | (Scotland) SCO | John Holt | 31 | 1 | 18 | 0 | 4 | 1 | 2 | 0 | 7 | 0 |
| | DF | (Scotland) SCO | Maurice Malpas | 57 | 1 | 36 | 0 | 7 | 1 | 4 | 0 | 10 | 0 |
| | DF | (Scotland) SCO | Gary McGinnis | 25 | 0 | 20 | 0 | 0 | 0 | 1 | 0 | 4 | 0 |
| | DF | (Scotland) SCO | Dave Narey | 54 | 0 | 33 | 0 | 7 | 0 | 4 | 0 | 10 | 0 |
| | DF | (England) ENG | Chris Sulley | 8 | 0 | 7 | 0 | 0 | 0 | 0 | 0 | 1 | 0 |
| | DF | (Scotland) SCO | Brian Welsh | 1 | 0 | 1 | 0 | 0 | 0 | 0 | 0 | 0 | 0 |
| | MF | (Scotland) SCO | Eamonn Bannon | 57 | 9 | 38 | 9 | 4 | 0 | 4 | 0 | 11 | 0 |
| | MF | (Scotland) SCO | Dave Bowman | 38 | 0 | 29 | 0 | 2 | 0 | 1 | 0 | 6 | 0 |
| | MF | (Scotland) SCO | Harry Curran | 3 | 0 | 3 | 0 | 0 | 0 | 0 | 0 | 0 | 0 |
| | MF | (Scotland) SCO | Alan Irvine | 19 | 4 | 16 | 2 | 1 | 2 | 1 | 0 | 1 | 0 |
| | MF | (Scotland) SCO | Paul Kinnaird | 11 | 0 | 7 | 0 | 3 | 0 | 0 | 0 | 1 | 0 |
| | MF | (Scotland) SCO | Billy Kirkwood | 18 | 1 | 11 | 1 | 4 | 0 | 0 | 0 | 3 | 0 |
| | MF | (Scotland) SCO | Jim McInally | 51 | 2 | 32 | 1 | 7 | 0 | 1 | 0 | 11 | 1 |
| | MF | (Scotland) SCO | Billy McKinlay | 5 | 0 | 3 | 0 | 1 | 0 | 0 | 0 | 1 | 0 |
| | MF | (Scotland) SCO | Gordon McLeod | 7 | 0 | 7 | 0 | 0 | 0 | 0 | 0 | 0 | 0 |
| | MF | (Scotland) SCO | Joe McLeod | 2 | 0 | 2 | 0 | 0 | 0 | 0 | 0 | 0 | 0 |
| | MF | (Scotland) SCO | Ralph Milne | 22 | 2 | 14 | 1 | 0 | 0 | 2 | 0 | 6 | 1 |
| | MF | (Scotland) SCO | Jimmy Page | 8 | 1 | 8 | 1 | 0 | 0 | 0 | 0 | 0 | 0 |
| | MF | (Scotland) SCO | Ian Redford | 59 | 11 | 37 | 8 | 7 | 0 | 4 | 0 | 11 | 3 |
| | FW | (Republic of Ireland) IRL | Tommy Coyne | 14 | 2 | 10 | 1 | 0 | 0 | 0 | 0 | 4 | 1 |
| | FW | (Scotland) SCO | Iain Ferguson | 51 | 28 | 36 | 16 | 7 | 5 | 3 | 5 | 5 | 2 |
| | FW | (Scotland) SCO | Kevin Gallacher | 57 | 16 | 37 | 10 | 6 | 3 | 4 | 2 | 10 | 1 |
| | FW | (Scotland) SCO | Paul Sturrock | 50 | 6 | 30 | 6 | 6 | 0 | 3 | 0 | 11 | 0 |

=== Goalscorers ===
United had 15 players score with the team scoring 97 goals in total. The top goalscorer was Iain Ferguson, who finished the season with 28 goals.

| Name | League | Cups | Total |
|---|---|---|---|
| Iain Ferguson | 16 | 12 | 28 |
| Kevin Gallacher | 10 | 6 | 16 |
| Ian Redford | 8 | 3 | 11 |
| Eamonn Bannon | 9 | 0 | 9 |
| John Clark | 3 | 4 | 7 |
| Paul Sturrock | 6 | 0 | 6 |
| Paul Hegarty | 4 | 1 | 5 |
| Own goals | 3 | 0 | 3 |
| Tommy Coyne | 1 | 1 | 2 |
| Jim McInally | 1 | 1 | 2 |
| Ralph Milne | 1 | 1 | 2 |
| Richard Gough | 1 | 0 | 1 |
| Billy Kirkwood | 1 | 0 | 1 |
| Jimmy Page | 1 | 0 | 1 |
| John Holt | 0 | 1 | 1 |
| Maurice Malpas | 0 | 1 | 1 |

=== Discipline ===
During the 1986–87 season, one United players was sent off. Statistics for cautions are unavailable.

| Name | Dismissals |
|---|---|
| Tommy Coyne | (red card) 1 |

== Competitions ==
=== League table ===
| Pos | Team | Pld | W | D | L | GF | GA | GD | Pts | Qualification or relegation |
|---|---|---|---|---|---|---|---|---|---|---|
| 1 | Rangers (C) | 44 | 31 | 7 | 6 | 85 | 23 | +62 | 69 | Qualification for the European Cup first round |
| 2 | Celtic | 44 | 27 | 9 | 8 | 90 | 41 | +49 | 63 | Qualification for the UEFA Cup first round |
| 3 | Dundee United | 44 | 24 | 12 | 8 | 66 | 36 | +30 | 60 | Qualification for the UEFA Cup first round |
| 4 | Aberdeen | 44 | 21 | 16 | 7 | 63 | 29 | +34 | 58 | Qualification for the UEFA Cup first round |
| 5 | Heart of Midlothian | 44 | 21 | 14 | 9 | 64 | 43 | +21 | 56 | |

Source: Statto
Rules for classification: 1) points; 2) goal difference; 3) number of goals scored.
(C) Champions

== Transfers ==
=== In ===
| Date | Player | From | Fee |
|---|---|---|---|
| 22 August 1986 | (Scotland) Iain Ferguson | (Scotland) Rangers | £145,000 |
| September 1986 | (England) Chris Sulley | (England) Bournemouth | Unknown |
| | (Scotland) Harry Curran | (Scotland) Dumbarton | Unknown |
| 25 November 1986 | (Scotland) Alan Main | (Scotland) Elgin City | £8,000 |
| January 1987 | (Scotland) Billy Kirkwood | (Scotland) Hibernian | Unknown |
| 18 June 1987 | (Scotland) Hamish French | (Scotland) Keith | £10,000 |
| June 1987 | (Scotland) Alan Irvine | (England) Crystal Palace | £100,000 |

=== Out ===
| Date | Player | To | Fee |
|---|---|---|---|
| 1 August 1986 | (Scotland) Richard Gough | (England) Tottenham Hotspur | £750,000 |
| 13 December 1986 | (Scotland) Tommy Coyne | (Scotland) Dundee | £75,000 |
| January 1987 | (Scotland) Ralph Milne | (England) Charlton Athletic | £125,000 |
| | (England) Chris Sulley | (England) Blackburn Rovers | £15,000 |
| | (Scotland) Jimmy Page | Retired | |

=== Loans out ===
| Date | Player | To | Until |
|---|---|---|---|
| | (England) Chris Sulley | (England) Blackburn Rovers | Unknown |

== See also ==
- 1986–87 in Scottish football
