= 1989–90 Dundee United F.C. season =

Dundee United
1989–90 season
- Chairman: Jim McLean
- Manager: Jim McLean
- Stadium: Tannadice Park
- Premier Division: Fourth place
- Scottish Cup: Semi-finals
- League Cup: Third round
- UEFA Cup: Second round
- Top goalscorer: League: Darren Jackson; Mixu Paatelainen (7); All: Mixu Paatelainen (9)
- Highest home attendance: 16,635 vs. Celtic, Premier Division, 13 January 1990
- Lowest home attendance: 5,957 vs. St Mirren, Premier Division, 17 February 1990
| Home colours | Away colours |

The 1989–90 season was the 81st year of football played by Dundee United, and covers the period from 1 July 1989 to 30 June 1990. United finished in fourth place, securing European football on the final day of the season.

== Summary ==
Dundee United played a total of 47 competitive matches during the 1989–90 season. The team finished fourth in the Scottish Premier Division.

In the cup competitions, United lost in the semi-final of the Scottish Cup to eventual winners Aberdeen and lost in the League Cup third round to Hamilton Academical.

The club signed three players during the season with a total public cost of just over £600,000. Four players were sold by the club during the season with a public total of just over £1m. The club made a profit of around £400k from transfers during the season. One player was loaned out during the season.

The club playing kits were sponsored by Belhaven Brewery for a third season.

== Fixtures and results ==
All results are written with Dundee United's score first.

=== Scottish Premier Division ===
| Date | Opponent | Venue | Result | Attendance | Scorers |
|---|---|---|---|---|---|
| 12 August 1989 | Motherwell | H | 1–1 | 8,596 | French |
| 19 August 1989 | Dundee | A | 3–4 | 13,616 | Malpas, M O'Neill, Paatelainen |
| 26 August 1989 | Dunfermline Athletic | H | 2–1 | 9,158 | Van der Hoorn, M O'Neill |
| 9 September 1989 | Hibernian | A | 0–2 | 7,000 | |
| 16 September 1989 | Celtic | H | 2–2 | 16,624 | Van der Hoorn, French |
| 23 September 1989 | Heart of Midlothian | A | 1–1 | 14,008 | McInally |
| 30 September 1989 | St Mirren | H | 0–0 | 6,643 | |
| 4 October 1989 | Aberdeen | H | 2–0 | 11,879 | McInally, Malpas |
| 14 October 1989 | Rangers | A | 1–2 | 36,062 | M O'Neill |
| 21 October 1989 | Motherwell | A | 2–3 | 8,100 | M O'Neill (2) |
| 28 October 1989 | Dundee | H | 0–0 | 11,529 | |
| 4 November 1989 | Dunfermline Athletic | A | 1–1 | 10,804 | Paatelainen |
| 8 November 1989 | Hibernian | H | 1–0 | 8,247 | Jackson |
| 18 November 1989 | Celtic | A | 1–0 | 35,350 | Gallacher |
| 25 November 1989 | Heart of Midlothian | H | 2–1 | 12,201 | Bowman, Paatelainen |
| 9 December 1989 | Aberdeen | A | 0–2 | 15,500 | McInally, Malpas |
| 13 December 1989 | St Mirren | A | 0–1 | 2,800 | |
| 16 December 1989 | Rangers | H | 1–1 | 15,947 | Paatelainen |
| 23 December 1989 | Motherwell | H | 1–1 | 6,169 | Paatelainen |
| 30 December 1989 | Dundee | A | 1–1 | 12,803 | Jackson |
| 3 January 1990 | Dunfermline Athletic | H | 1–0 | 11,148 | Jackson |
| 6 January 1990 | Hibernian | A | 0–0 | 6,500 | |
| 13 January 1990 | Celtic | H | 2–0 | 16,635 | Connolly (2) |
| 27 January 1990 | Heart of Midlothian | A | 2–3 | 13,083 | Connolly, Paatelainen |
| 3 February 1990 | Rangers | A | 1–3 | 39,058 | Clark |
| 10 February 1990 | Aberdeen | H | 1–1 | 10,533 | McInally |
| 17 February 1990 | St Mirren | H | 2–0 | 5,957 | Jackson, Connolly |
| 3 March 1990 | Celtic | A | 0–3 | 23,541 | |
| 10 March 1990 | Motherwell | A | 1–0 | 4,697 | Jackson |
| 24 March 1990 | Dundee | H | 1–2 | 11,918 | Connolly |
| 31 March 1990 | Dunfermline Athletic | A | 1–0 | 6,945 | Jackson |
| 7 April 1990 | Hibernian | H | 1–0 | 6,633 | Paatelainen |
| 18 April 1990 | Aberdeen | A | 0–1 | 10,000 | |
| 21 April 1990 | Rangers | H | 0–1 | 15,996 | |
| 28 April 1990 | Heart of Midlothian | H | 1–1 | 7,679 | Jackson |
| 5 May 1990 | St Mirren | A | 0–0 | 4,312 | |

=== Scottish Cup ===
| Date | Round | Opponent | Venue | Result | Attendance | Scorers |
|---|---|---|---|---|---|---|
| 20 January 1990 | Third round | Dundee | A | 0–0 | 14,176 | |
| 23 January 1990 | Third round replay | Dundee | H | 1–0 | 16,228 | Clark |
| 24 February 1990 | Fourth round | Queen of the South | H | 2–1 | 5,948 | Connolly, Paatelainen |
| 17 March 1990 | Quarter–finals | Hibernian | H | 1–0 | 13,874 | Jackson |
| 14 April 1990 | Semi–finals | Aberdeen | N | 0–4 | 16,581 | |

=== Scottish League Cup ===
| Date | Round | Opponent | Venue | Result | Attendance | Scorers |
|---|---|---|---|---|---|---|
| 16 August 1989 | Second round | Partick Thistle | H | 1–0 | 7,043 | M O'Neill |
| 23 August 1989 | Third round | Hamilton Academical | A | 1–2 | 2,600 | Hinds |

=== UEFA Cup ===
| Date | Round | Opponent | Venue | Result | Attendance | Scorers |
|---|---|---|---|---|---|---|
| 13 September 1989 | First round 1st leg | (Northern Ireland) Glentoran | A | 3–1 | 8,000 | Cleland, McInally, Hinds |
| 27 September 1989 | First round 2nd leg | (Northern Ireland) Glentoran | H | 2–0 | 9,340 | Clark, Gallacher |
| 17 October 1989 | Second round 1st leg | (Belgium) Royal Antwerp | A | 0–4 | 10,000 | |
| 31 October 1989 | Second round 2nd leg | (Belgium) Royal Antwerp | H | 3–2 | 8,994 | M O'Neill, Paatelainen, Clark |

== Player statistics ==
During the 1989–90 season, United used 25 different players comprising five nationalities. Maurice Malpas was the only player to play in every match. The table below shows the number of appearances and goals scored by each player.

| No. | Pos | Nat | Player | Total | | Premier Division | | Scottish Cup | | League Cup | | UEFA Cup | |
| No. | Pos | Nat | Player | Apps | Goals | Apps | Goals | Apps | Goals | Apps | Goals | Apps | Goals |
|---|---|---|---|---|---|---|---|---|---|---|---|---|---|
| | GK | (Scotland) SCO | Alan Main | 33 | 0 | 27 | 0 | 5 | 0 | 0 | 0 | 1 | 0 |
| | GK | (Scotland) SCO | Billy Thomson | 11 | 0 | 7 | 0 | 0 | 0 | 1 | 0 | 3 | 0 |
| | GK | (Scotland) SCO | Scott Thomson | 3 | 0 | 2 | 0 | 0 | 0 | 1 | 0 | 0 | 0 |
| | DF | (Scotland) SCO | John Clark | 37 | 4 | 28 | 1 | 4 | 1 | 2 | 0 | 3 | 2 |
| | DF | (Scotland) SCO | Alex Cleland | 17 | 1 | 15 | 0 | 0 | 0 | 0 | 0 | 2 | 1 |
| | DF | (Scotland) SCO | Paul Hegarty | 7 | 0 | 5 | 0 | 0 | 0 | 0 | 0 | 2 | 0 |
| | DF | (Netherlands) NED | Fred van der Hoorn | 42 | 2 | 31 | 2 | 5 | 0 | 2 | 0 | 4 | 0 |
| | DF | (Socialist Federal Republic of Yugoslavia) YUG | Miodrag Krivokapić | 34 | 0 | 26 | 0 | 5 | 0 | 1 | 0 | 2 | 0 |
| | DF | (Scotland) SCO | Maurice Malpas | 40 | 2 | 30 | 2 | 4 | 0 | 2 | 0 | 4 | 0 |
| | DF | (Scotland) SCO | Gary McGinnis | 6 | 0 | 6 | 0 | 0 | 0 | 0 | 0 | 0 | 0 |
| | DF | (Scotland) SCO | Dave Narey | 41 | 0 | 31 | 0 | 5 | 0 | 2 | 0 | 3 | 0 |
| | DF | (Scotland) SCO | Brian Welsh | 5 | 0 | 5 | 0 | 0 | 0 | 0 | 0 | 0 | 0 |
| | MF | (Scotland) SCO | Charlie Adam | 1 | 0 | 0 | 0 | 0 | 0 | 1 | 0 | 0 | 0 |
| | MF | (Scotland) SCO | Dave Bowman | 34 | 1 | 24 | 1 | 5 | 0 | 1 | 0 | 4 | 0 |
| | MF | (Scotland) SCO | Alan Irvine | 1 | 0 | 1 | 0 | 0 | 0 | 0 | 0 | 0 | 0 |
| | MF | (Scotland) SCO | Jim McInally | 46 | 4 | 35 | 3 | 5 | 0 | 2 | 0 | 4 | 1 |
| | MF | (Scotland) SCO | Billy McKinlay | 18 | 0 | 13 | 0 | 2 | 0 | 1 | 0 | 2 | 0 |
| | MF | (Scotland) SCO | Ray McKinnon | 11 | 0 | 10 | 0 | 1 | 0 | 0 | 0 | 0 | 0 |
| | MF | (Scotland) SCO | Joe McLeod | 2 | 0 | 2 | 0 | 0 | 0 | 0 | 0 | 0 | 0 |
| | MF | (Scotland) SCO | John O'Neil | 10 | 0 | 10 | 0 | 0 | 0 | 0 | 0 | 0 | 0 |
| | MF | (Northern Ireland) NIR | Michael O'Neill | 25 | 7 | 18 | 5 | 1 | 0 | 2 | 1 | 4 | 1 |
| | MF | (Scotland) SCO | Allan Preston | 11 | 0 | 8 | 0 | 2 | 0 | 0 | 0 | 1 | 0 |
| | FW | (Scotland) SCO | Paddy Connolly | 19 | 6 | 15 | 5 | 4 | 1 | 0 | 0 | 0 | 0 |
| | FW | (Scotland) SCO | Hamish French | 13 | 2 | 11 | 2 | 1 | 0 | 0 | 0 | 1 | 0 |
| | FW | (Scotland) SCO | Kevin Gallacher | 24 | 2 | 17 | 1 | 1 | 0 | 2 | 0 | 4 | 1 |
| | FW | (Barbados) BRB | Peter Hinds | 18 | 3 | 13 | 1 | 1 | 0 | 1 | 1 | 3 | 1 |
| | FW | (Scotland) SCO | Darren Jackson | 32 | 8 | 25 | 7 | 5 | 1 | 1 | 0 | 1 | 0 |
| | FW | (Finland) FIN | Mixu Paatelainen | 41 | 9 | 31 | 7 | 5 | 1 | 2 | 0 | 3 | 1 |

=== Goalscorers ===
United had 13 players score with the team scoring 50 goals in total. The top goalscorer was Mixu Paatelainen, who finished the season with nine goals.

| Name | League | Cups | Total |
|---|---|---|---|
| Mixu Paatelainen | 7 | 0 | 9 |
| Darren Jackson | 7 | 1 | 8 |
| Michael O'Neill | 5 | 2 | 7 |
| Paddy Connolly | 5 | 1 | 6 |
| Jim McInally | 3 | 1 | 4 |
| John Clark | 1 | 3 | 4 |
| Hamish French | 2 | 0 | 2 |
| Fred van der Hoorn | 2 | 0 | 2 |
| Maurice Malpas | 2 | 0 | 2 |
| Kevin Gallacher | 1 | 1 | 2 |
| Peter Hinds | 0 | 2 | 2 |
| Dave Bowman | 1 | 0 | 1 |
| Alex Cleland | 0 | 1 | 1 |

=== Discipline ===
During the 1989–90 season, one United player was sent off. Statistics for cautions are unavailable.

| Name | Dismissals |
|---|---|
| Miodrag Krivokapić | (red card) 1 |

== Competitions ==
=== League table ===
| Pos | Team | Pld | W | D | L | GF | GA | GD | Pts | Qualification or relegation |
|---|---|---|---|---|---|---|---|---|---|---|
| 2 | Aberdeen | 36 | 17 | 10 | 9 | 56 | 33 | +23 | 44 | Qualification for the Cup Winners' Cup first round |
| 3 | Heart of Midlothian | 36 | 16 | 12 | 8 | 54 | 35 | +19 | 44 | Qualification for the UEFA Cup first round |
| 4 | Dundee United | 36 | 11 | 13 | 12 | 36 | 39 | −3 | 35 | Qualification for the UEFA Cup first round |
| 5 | Celtic | 36 | 10 | 14 | 12 | 37 | 37 | 0 | 34 | |
| 6 | Motherwell | 36 | 11 | 12 | 13 | 43 | 47 | −4 | 34 | |

Source: RSSSF
Rules for classification: 1) points; 2) goal difference; 3) number of goals scored.

== Transfers ==
=== In ===
| Date | Player | From | Fee |
|---|---|---|---|
| 1 July 1989 | (Barbados) Peter Hinds | (Japan) Fujita Kogyo | £65,000 |
| 2 August 1989 | (Netherlands) Freddy van der Hoorn | (Netherlands) Den Bosch | £200,000 |
| 15 August 1989 | (Northern Ireland) Michael O'Neill | (England) Newcastle United | £350,000 |

=== Out ===
| Date | Player | To | Fee |
|---|---|---|---|
| September 1989 | (Scotland) Charlie Adam | (Scotland) Partick Thistle | Unknown |
| 22 November 1989 | (Scotland) Alan Irvine | (England) Blackburn Rovers | £30,000 |
| January 1990 | (Scotland) Paul Hegarty | (Scotland) St Johnstone | Free |
| 25 January 1990 | (Scotland) Kevin Gallacher | (England) Coventry City | £900,000 |
| 8 February 1990 | (Scotland) Gary McGinnis | (Scotland) St Johnstone | £100,000 |
| 1990 | (Scotland) Joe McLeod | (Scotland) Motherwell | Unknown |

=== Loans out ===
| Date | Player | To | Duration |
|---|---|---|---|
| October 1989 | (Scotland) Alan Irvine | (England) Blackburn Rovers | 1 month |

== See also ==
- 1989–90 in Scottish football
