= 1988 Scottish Cup final =

1988 Scottish Cup Final
- Event: 1987–88 Scottish Cup
Celtic	Dundee United
2	1
- Date: 14 May 1988
- Venue: Hampden Park, Glasgow
- Referee: George Smith
- Attendance: 74,000

The 1988 Scottish Cup Final was played between Celtic and Dundee United at Hampden Park on 14 May 1988. Celtic had reached the final after coming from behind to defeat Hearts 2-1 in the semi-final, while Dundee United had defeated Aberdeen 1-0 in their semi-final after two replays.

Celtic won 2–1, with Frank McAvennie scoring both of their goals. They had been 1-0 down after Kevin Gallacher put Dundee United ahead, only for McAvennie to score a late equaliser and then a winner with a low right foot shot at the back post after a corner to complete the double for Celtic, who were already Premier Division champions.

== Match ==
=== Report ===
After a goalless first half, Kevin Gallacher opened the scoring for Dundee United a few minutes after halftime. Gallacher outpaced Celtic's Roy Aitken to a ball which had been headed forward by Eamonn Bannon and shot passed Celtic's goalkeeper Allen McKnight, who was in the team due to an injury to Celtic's regular goalie Packie Bonner. Shortly afterwards United failed to take the opportunity to increase their lead when Bannon missed two good opportunities. This proved costly when Frank McAvennie equalised for Celtic. McAvennie then scored the winner with 50 seconds of play remaining.

The defeat meant that United had now lost all five Scottish Cup finals that they had played in. The scoreline and pattern of the match was noted by reporter Jim Traynor for being similar to the 1985 final when Celtic had also defeated United. Traynor suggested that for Dundee United the 1988 final was like a 're-run of a bad movie'.

=== Details ===
14 May 1988

Celtic	2 – 1	Dundee United
Frank McAvennie 76', 90'	Report	Kevin Gallacher 49'

Hampden Park, Glasgow
Attendance: 74,000
Referee: George Smith

CELTIC:
GK	1	(Northern Ireland) Allen McKnight
DF	2	(Republic of Ireland) Chris Morris
DF	5	(Republic of Ireland) Mick McCarthy
DF	6	(Scotland) Derek Whyte	(substituted off) 70'
DF	3	(Northern Ireland) Anton Rogan
MF	7	(Scotland) Joe Miller
MF	4	(Scotland) Roy Aitken
MF	8	(Scotland) Paul McStay (c)
MF	11	(Scotland) Tommy Burns
FW	9	(Scotland) Frank McAvennie
FW	10	(Scotland) Andy Walker		(substituted off) 70'
Substitutes:
MF		(Scotland) Billy Stark	(substituted on) 70'
FW		(Scotland) Mark McGhee		(substituted on) 70'
Manager:
(Scotland) Billy McNeill

DUNDEE UNITED:
GK	(Scotland) Billy Thomson
DF	(Scotland) David Bowman
DF	(Scotland) Paul Hegarty
DF	(Scotland) David Narey
DF	(Scotland) Maurice Malpas (c)
MF	(Scotland) Billy McKinlay
MF	(Scotland) Jim McInally
MF	(Scotland) Eamonn Bannon
FW	(Scotland) Kevin Gallacher
FW	(Finland) Mixu Paatelainen	(substituted off) 71'
FW	(Scotland) Iain Ferguson
Substitutes:
MF	(Scotland) John Clark	(substituted on) 71'
FW	(Scotland) Paul Sturrock
Manager:
(Scotland) Jim McLean
