= Gordon McLeod =

Gordon McLeod may refer to:

- Gordon McLeod (actor) (1890–1961), British actor
- Gordon McLeod (basketball) (born 1956), Australian basketball player and coach
- Gordon McLeod (footballer) (born 1967), Scottish footballer
