= Alan Irvine (footballer, born 1962) =

Scottish footballer

Personal information
- Full name: Alan James Irvine
- Date of birth: 29 November 1962 (age 63)
- Place of birth: Broxburn, Scotland
- Height: 6 ft 2 in (1.88 m)
- Position: Striker

Senior career*
Years	Team	Apps	(Gls)
1979–1980	Blackburn United		
1980–1982	Hibernian	0	(0)
1982–1986	Falkirk	110	(18)
1986–1987	Liverpool	2	(0)
1987–1988	Dundee United	7	(0)
1988–1989	Shrewsbury Town	37	(6)
1989–1990	Mazda	21	(10)
1990–1992	St Mirren	39	(3)
1992–1993	Portadown		
1993–1995	East Fife	44	(9)
Total		239	(36)
- * Club domestic league appearances and goals

Alan James Irvine (born 29 November 1962) is a Scottish former footballer, who played as a striker for a number of clubs in Scotland, England, Japan and Northern Ireland.

== Career ==
Irvine began his career with Blackburn United, but was also on Schoolboy forms with Hibernian, before signing at 16 on professional forms until 18. Irvine failed to make a senior appearance for the Easter Road side and moved to Whitburn Juniors, before joining Falkirk in 1983. After four years, and over 100 league appearances for the Bairns, Irvine moved to Liverpool. However, he made just four appearances during his time on Merseyside, one of which was as a second-half substitute in Liverpool's League Cup quarter-final win against Everton at Goodison Park.

A similarly short spell at Dundee United followed, before fifteen months at Shrewsbury Town. In 1989, Irvine moved to Japanese club Mazda, but returned to Scotland in 1990 with St Mirren, playing just under 40 times for the Buddies. Irvine then spent time with Northern Irish side Portadown, where his achilles tendon rupture side-lined him for two years. Alex Totten signed Irvine for a second time, beginning a final two-year playing spell with East Fife, where he retired from playing in 1995.

== See also ==
- 1987–88 Dundee United F.C. season
