= Jimmy Page (footballer) =

Scottish footballer (born 1964)

Personal information
- Date of birth: 29 October 1964 (age 61)
- Place of birth: Dundee, Scotland
- Position: Midfielder

Youth career
- Celtic Boys Club

Senior career*
| Years | Team | Apps | (Gls) |
| 1983–1987 | Dundee United | 13 | (1) |
- * Club domestic league appearances and goals

James Page (born 29 October 1964) is a Scottish former footballer who played as a midfielder. Page was with Celtic Boys Club before joining Dundee United in 1983. Page was called up for Scotland's under-18 side in February 1983. He made his debut for Dundee United in April 1984 against Motherwell. Unfortunately he broke his leg after only two minutes. Playing thirteen times for the Terrors, Page made his last senior appearance in May 1987 before retiring due to injury. It is not known whether he stayed in football after this.

== See also ==
- Dundee United F.C. season 1986-87
