= 1987–88 in Scottish football =

91st competitive football season in Scotland

Premier Division champions
- Celtic

Division One champions
- Hamilton Academical

Division Two champions
- Ayr United

Scottish Cup winners
- Celtic

League Cup winners
- Rangers

Junior Cup winners
- Auchinleck Talbot

Teams in Europe
- Aberdeen, Celtic, Dundee United, Rangers, St Mirren

Scotland national team
- UEFA Euro 1988 qualifying, Rous Cup
- ← 1986–87 1988–89 →

The 1987–88 season was the 91st season of competitive football in Scotland.

== Notable events ==
Billy McNeill's second spell back in charge of Celtic began in style as they finished the season by winning the double of the league title and Scottish Cup. The cup triumph was sealed with two late goals from Frank McAvennie, signed in early October from West Ham United, as they had trailed 1–0 to Dundee United.

Rangers, further strengthened with the signing of Englishmen Ray Wilkins and Mark Walters in midfield, had consolation for their failure to repeat title glory in the shape of a League Cup win. They could only finish third in the league, with Hearts finishing second – 10 points adrift of champions Celtic.

The Old Firm league fixture at Ibrox in October 1987, which ended in a 2–2 draw, saw three players red carded. Charges were later brought against four of the players (three from Rangers, one from Celtic) by the Procurator Fiscal. The resulting Court case ended up with Terry Butcher and Chris Woods being convicted of a breach of the peace. Graham Roberts was found Not proven, whilst Frank McAvennie was acquitted.

Rangers enjoyed the longest run in Europe out of all the Scottish clubs, reaching the European Cup quarter finals where they were edged out by Steaua Bucharest.

A reduction of the Premier Division from 12 clubs to 10 saw three clubs (Falkirk, Dunfirmline Athletic and Morton) relegated. The only promotion place went to Division One champions Hamilton Academical.

== Scottish Premier Division ==
| Pos | Team | Pld | W | D | L | GF | GA | GD | Pts | Qualification or relegation |
|---|---|---|---|---|---|---|---|---|---|---|
| 1 | Celtic (C) | 44 | 31 | 10 | 3 | 79 | 23 | +56 | 72 | Qualification for the European Cup first round |
| 2 | Heart of Midlothian | 44 | 23 | 16 | 5 | 74 | 32 | +42 | 62 | Qualification for the UEFA Cup first round |
| 3 | Rangers | 44 | 26 | 8 | 10 | 85 | 34 | +51 | 60 | Qualification for the UEFA Cup first round |
| 4 | Aberdeen | 44 | 21 | 17 | 6 | 56 | 25 | +31 | 59 | Qualification for the UEFA Cup first round |
| 5 | Dundee United | 44 | 16 | 15 | 13 | 54 | 47 | +7 | 47 | Qualification for the Cup Winners' Cup first round |
| 6 | Hibernian | 44 | 12 | 19 | 13 | 41 | 42 | −1 | 43 | |
| 7 | Dundee | 44 | 17 | 7 | 20 | 70 | 64 | +6 | 41 | |
| 8 | Motherwell | 44 | 13 | 10 | 21 | 37 | 56 | −19 | 36 | |
| 9 | St Mirren | 44 | 10 | 15 | 19 | 41 | 64 | −23 | 35 | |
| 10 | Falkirk (R) | 44 | 10 | 11 | 23 | 41 | 75 | −34 | 31 | Relegation to the 1988–89 Scottish First Division |
| 11 | Dunfermline Athletic (R) | 44 | 8 | 10 | 26 | 41 | 84 | −43 | 26 | Relegation to the 1988–89 Scottish First Division |
| 12 | Morton (R) | 44 | 3 | 10 | 31 | 27 | 100 | −73 | 16 | Relegation to the 1988–89 Scottish First Division |

Source: Statto
Rules for classification: 1) points; 2) goal difference; 3) number of goals scored.
(C) Champions; (R) Relegated

Champions: Celtic
Relegated: Falkirk, Dunfermline Athletic, Morton

== Scottish League Division One ==
| Pos | Team | Pld | W | D | L | GF | GA | GD | Pts | Promotion or relegation |
|---|---|---|---|---|---|---|---|---|---|---|
| 1 | Hamilton Academical (C, P) | 44 | 22 | 12 | 10 | 67 | 39 | +28 | 56 | Promotion to the Premier Division |
| 2 | Meadowbank Thistle | 44 | 20 | 12 | 12 | 71 | 37 | +34 | 52 | |
| 3 | Clydebank | 44 | 21 | 7 | 16 | 59 | 61 | −2 | 49 | |
| 4 | Forfar Athletic | 44 | 16 | 16 | 12 | 67 | 58 | +9 | 48 | |
| 5 | Raith Rovers | 44 | 19 | 7 | 18 | 81 | 76 | +5 | 45 | |
| 6 | Airdrieonians | 44 | 16 | 13 | 15 | 65 | 68 | −3 | 45 | |
| 7 | Queen of the South | 44 | 14 | 15 | 15 | 56 | 67 | −11 | 43 | |
| 8 | Partick Thistle | 44 | 16 | 9 | 19 | 60 | 64 | −4 | 41 | |
| 9 | Clyde | 44 | 16 | 6 | 22 | 73 | 75 | −2 | 38 | |
| 10 | Kilmarnock | 44 | 13 | 11 | 20 | 55 | 60 | −5 | 37 | |
| 11 | East Fife (R) | 44 | 13 | 10 | 21 | 61 | 76 | −15 | 36 | Relegation to the Second Division |
| 12 | Dumbarton (R) | 44 | 12 | 12 | 20 | 51 | 70 | −19 | 36 | Relegation to the Second Division |

Source: RSSSF and statto
Rules for classification: 1) points; 2) goal difference; 3) number of goals scored.
(C) Champions; (P) Promoted; (R) Relegated

Promoted: Hamilton Academical
Relegated: East Fife, Dumbarton

== Scottish League Division Two ==
| Pos | Team | Pld | W | D | L | GF | GA | GD | Pts | Promotion |
|---|---|---|---|---|---|---|---|---|---|---|
| 1 | Ayr United (C, P) | 39 | 27 | 7 | 5 | 95 | 31 | +64 | 61 | Promotion to the First Division |
| 2 | St Johnstone (P) | 39 | 26 | 9 | 4 | 75 | 23 | +52 | 61 | Promotion to the First Division |
| 3 | Queen's Park | 39 | 21 | 9 | 9 | 64 | 44 | +20 | 51 | |
| 4 | Brechin City | 39 | 20 | 8 | 11 | 56 | 40 | +16 | 48 | |
| 5 | Stirling Albion | 39 | 18 | 10 | 11 | 60 | 51 | +9 | 46 | |
| 6 | East Stirlingshire | 39 | 15 | 13 | 11 | 52 | 48 | +4 | 43 | |
| 7 | Alloa Athletic | 39 | 16 | 8 | 15 | 50 | 46 | +4 | 40 | |
| 8 | Montrose | 39 | 12 | 11 | 16 | 45 | 51 | −6 | 35 | |
| 9 | Arbroath | 39 | 10 | 14 | 15 | 54 | 66 | −12 | 34 | |
| 10 | Stenhousemuir | 39 | 12 | 9 | 18 | 49 | 58 | −9 | 33 | |
| 11 | Cowdenbeath | 39 | 9 | 13 | 17 | 50 | 67 | −17 | 31 | |
| 12 | Albion Rovers | 39 | 10 | 11 | 18 | 45 | 75 | −30 | 31 | |
| 13 | Berwick Rangers | 39 | 6 | 4 | 29 | 33 | 78 | −45 | 16 | |
| 14 | Stranraer | 39 | 4 | 8 | 27 | 34 | 84 | −50 | 16 | |

Source: "1987-1988 Second Division - SPFL Archive". SPFL.
Rules for classification: 1) points; 2) goal difference; 3) number of goals scored.
(C) Champions; (P) Promoted

Promoted: Ayr United, St Johnstone

== Other honours ==
=== Cup honours ===
| Competition | Winner | Score | Runner-up |
|---|---|---|---|
| Scottish Cup 1987–88 | Celtic | 2–1 | Dundee United |
| League Cup 1987–88 | Rangers | 3 – 3 (a.e.t.) (5 – 3 pen.) | Aberdeen |
| Youth Cup | Dunfermline Athletic | 2–1 | Dundee |
| Junior Cup | Auchinleck Talbot | 1–0 | Petershill |

=== Non-league honours ===
==== Senior ====
| Competition | Winner |
|---|---|
| Highland League 1987–88 | Inverness Caledonian |
| East of Scotland League | Whitehill Welfare |
| South of Scotland League | Newton Stewart |

=== Individual honours ===
| Award | Winner | Club |
|---|---|---|
| Footballer of the Year | (Scotland) Paul McStay | Celtic |
| Players' Player of the Year | (Scotland) Paul McStay | Celtic |
| Young Player of the Year | (Scotland) John Collins | Hibernian |

== Scottish clubs in Europe ==
Results for Scotland's participants in European competition for the 1987–88 season

=== Rangers ===
| Date | Venue | Opponents | Score | Competition | Rangers scorer(s) |
European Cup
| 16 September 1987 | Olympic Stadium, Kyiv (A) | Dynamo Kyiv | 0–1 | EC1 | |
| 30 September 1987 | Ibrox Stadium, Glasgow (H) | Dynamo Kyiv | 2–0 | EC1 | Mark Falco, Ally McCoist |
| 21 October 1987 | Ibrox Stadium, Glasgow (H) | Górnik Zabrze | 3–1 | EC2 | Ally McCoist, Ian Durrant, Mark Falco |
| 4 November 1987 | Ernest Pohl Stadium, Zabrze (A) | Górnik Zabrze | 1–1 | EC2 | Ally McCoist (pen.) |
| 2 March 1988 | Steaua Stadium, Bucharest (A) | Steaua Bucharest | 0–2 | ECQF | |
| 16 March 1988 | Ibrox Stadium, Glasgow (H) | Steaua Bucharest | 2–1 | ECQF | Richard Gough, Ally McCoist (pen.) |

=== St Mirren ===
| Date | Venue | Opponents | Score | Competition | St Mirren scorer(s) |
|---|---|---|---|---|---|
| | UEFA Cup Winners' Cup | | | | |
| 16 September 1987 | Love Street, Paisley (H) | Tromsø IL | 1–0 | CWC1 | Kenny McDowall |
| 29 September 1987 | Alfheim Stadium, Tromsø (A) | Tromsø IL | 0–0 | CWC1 | |
| 21 October 1987 | Achter de Kazerne, Mechelen (A) | KV Mechelen | 0–0 | CWC2 | |
| 4 November 1987 | Love Street, Paisley (H) | KV Mechelen | 0–2 | CWC2 | |

=== Aberdeen ===
| Date | Venue | Opponents | Score | Competition | Aberdeen Scorer(s) |
UEFA Cup
| 15 September 1987 | Dalymount Park, Dublin (A) | Bohemians | 0–0 | UC1 | |
| 30 September 1987 | Pittodrie, Aberdeen (H) | Bohemians | 1–0 | UC1 | Jim Bett (pen.) |
| 21 October 1987 | Pittodrie, Aberdeen (H) | Feyenoord Rotterdam | 2–1 | UC2 | Willie Falconer, Willie Miller |
| 4 November 1987 | Feijenoord Stadion, Rotterdam (A) | Feyenoord Rotterdam | 0–1 | UC2 | |

=== Celtic ===
| Date | Venue | Opponents | Score | Competition | Celtic scorer(s) |
UEFA Cup
| 15 September 1987 | Celtic Park, Glasgow (H) | Borussia Dortmund | 2–1 | UC1 | Andy Walker, Derek Whyte |
| 30 September 1987 | Westfalenstadion, Dortmund (A) | Borussia Dortmund | 0–2 | UC1 | |

=== Dundee United ===
| Date | Venue | Opponents | Score | Competition | Dundee United scorer(s) |
UEFA Cup
| 16 September 1987 | The Showgrounds Coleraine (A) | Coleraine | 1–0 | UC1 | Paul Sturrock |
| 30 September 1987 | Tannadice, Dundee (H) | Coleraine | 3–1 | UC1 | Kevin Gallacher, Paul Sturrock, John Clark |
| 21 October 1987 | Tannadice, Dundee (H) | FC Vítkovice | 1–2 | UC2 | Iain Ferguson |
| 4 November 1987 | Bazaly, Ostrava (A) | FC Vítkovice | 1–1 | UC2 | own goal |

== Scotland national team ==
| Date | Venue | Opponents | Score | Competition | Scotland scorer(s) |
|---|---|---|---|---|---|
| 9 September 1987 | Hampden Park, Glasgow (H) | Hungary | 2–0 | Friendly | Ally McCoist (2) |
| 14 October 1987 | Hampden Park, Glasgow (H) | Belgium | 2–0 | ECQG7 | Ally McCoist, Paul McStay |
| 11 November 1987 | Vasil Levski, Sofia (A) | Bulgaria | 1–0 | ECQG7 | Gary Mackay |
| 2 December 1987 | Stade de la Frontière, Esch (A) | Luxembourg | 0–0 | ECQG7 | |
| 17 February 1988 | Malaz Stadium, Riyadh (A) | Saudi Arabia | 2–2 | Friendly | Maurice Johnston, John Collins |
| 22 March 1988 | Ta'Qali Stadium, Valletta (A) | Malta | 1–1 | Friendly | Graeme Sharp |
| 27 April 1988 | Santiago Bernabéu Stadium, Madrid (A) | Spain | 0–0 | Friendly | |
| 17 May 1988 | Hampden Park, Glasgow (H) | Colombia | 0–0 | Rous Cup | |
| 21 May 1988 | Wembley Stadium, London (A) | England | 0–1 | Rous Cup | |

Key:

- (H) = Home match
- (A) = Away match
- ECQG7 = European Championship qualifying – Group 7

== See also ==
- 1987–88 Aberdeen F.C. season
- 1987–88 Dundee United F.C. season
- 1987–88 Rangers F.C. season
- Dubai Champions Cup
