= 1993–94 Blackburn Rovers F.C. season =

Blackburn Rovers
1993–94 season
- Owner: Jack Walker
- Chairman: Robert Coar
- Manager: Kenny Dalglish
- Stadium: Ewood Park
- FA Premier League: 2nd
- FA Cup: Third round
- League Cup: Fourth round
- Top goalscorer: League: Shearer (31); All: Shearer (34)
- Average home league attendance: 17,721
Home colours

During the 1993–94 English football season, Blackburn Rovers F.C. competed in the FA Premier League.

== Season summary ==
It was another strong season for a resurgent Blackburn, who were in the higher reaches of the Premier League all season long and, at one stage in early April, were level on points with leaders Manchester United, who had led the league almost from start to finish and entered 1994 with a 16-point lead. The return of Alan Shearer from a long-term injury saw him make a swift return to his superb form of old, with the 23-year-old hitman scoring 31 goals in the league, including both of Blackburn's goals in an early April win over Manchester United at Ewood Park. Before the start of the season, Blackburn had been pipped by Manchester United to the signature of Nottingham Forest midfielder Roy Keane for a national record fee of £3.75million.

In the end, though, it wasn't quite enough to snatch the title crown off Manchester United, who had returned to their winning ways before the end of April, after Blackburn took their turn to drop points, and Kenny Dalglish's men had to settle for runners-up spot and a UEFA Cup place. This meant that Blackburn would be competing in Europe for the very first time in their history, although in the UEFA Cup rather than the European Cup as would have happened if they had won the league. Blackburn's fourth-place finish a year earlier had not been enough for a UEFA Cup place due to English clubs still not having all their UEFA Cup places back despite their ban from European competitions arising from the Heysel disaster having been lifted for the 1990–91 season.

Blackburn fans were thrilled after the end of the season when 21-year-old Norwich City striker Chris Sutton joined the club for an English record fee of £5 million, following competition from the likes of Arsenal and Manchester United for his signature. With the most expensive striker-partnership in the country, the club's fans were given all the more reason to expect their team to succeed in at least one of the four major competitions that they would be contesting next season.

== Kit ==
Japanese company Asics manufactured Blackburn's kit this season. British brewery McEwan's Lager were the kit sponsors.

== Final league table ==
Pos	Team	Pld	W	D	L	GF	GA	GD	Pts	Qualification or relegation
1	Manchester United (C)	42	27	11	4	80	38	+42	92	Qualification for the Champions League group stage
2	Blackburn Rovers	42	25	9	8	63	36	+27	84	Qualification for the UEFA Cup first round
3	Newcastle United	42	23	8	11	82	41	+41	77	Qualification for the UEFA Cup first round
4	Arsenal	42	18	17	7	53	28	+25	71	Qualification for the Cup Winners' Cup first round (Note: Arsenal qualified for the Cup Winners' Cup as the defending champions.)
5	Leeds United	42	18	16	8	65	39	+26	70	

Source: Premier League
Rules for classification: 1) points; 2) goal difference; 3) number of goals scored.
(C) Champions

== Results ==
Blackburn Rovers' score comes first

=== Legend ===
Win	Draw	Loss

=== FA Premier League ===
Date	Opponent	Venue	Result	Attendance	Scorers
14 August 1993	Chelsea	A	2–1	29,189	Newell, Ripley
18 August 1993	Norwich City	H	2–3	14,236	Atkins, Wilcox
21 August 1993	Oldham Athletic	H	1–0	14,397	Moran
24 August 1993	Manchester City	A	2–0	25,185	Newell, Gallacher
29 August 1993	Newcastle United	A	1–1	34,272	Shearer
2 September 1993	Arsenal	H	1–1	14,051	Gallacher
12 September 1993	Liverpool	A	1–0	37,355	Newell
18 September 1993	West Ham United	H	0–2	13,943	
25 September 1993	Sheffield Wednesday	H	1–1	13,917	Shearer
2 October 1993	Swindon Town	A	3–1	15,224	Shearer (2), Ripley
18 October 1993	Sheffield United	H	0–0	13,505	
23 October 1993	Leeds United	A	3–3	37,827	Shearer (3)
30 October 1993	Tottenham Hotspur	H	1–0	16,849	Shearer
6 November 1993	Queens Park Rangers	A	0–1	17,636	
20 November 1993	Southampton	H	2–0	16,666	Shearer (2)
23 November 1993	Coventry City	H	2–1	15,136	Shearer (2)
27 November 1993	Ipswich Town	A	0–1	14,582	
5 December 1993	Chelsea	H	2–0	15,736	Le Saux, Shearer
11 December 1993	Oldham Athletic	A	2–1	13,887	Shearer (2)
18 December 1993	Manchester City	H	2–0	18,741	Gallacher, Shearer
26 December 1993	Manchester United	A	1–1	44,511	Gallacher
29 December 1993	Everton	H	2–0	26,015	Shearer (2)
1 January 1994	Aston Villa	A	1–0	40,903	Shearer
15 January 1994	Sheffield United	A	2–1	19,124	Shearer (2)
23 January 1994	Leeds United	H	2–1	16,938	Shearer (2)
5 February 1994	Wimbledon	H	3–0	16,215	Shearer, Wilcox, Ripley
12 February 1994	Tottenham Hotspur	A	2–0	30,236	Shearer, Gallacher
19 February 1994	Newcastle United	H	1–0	21,269	May
22 February 1994	Norwich City	A	2–2	15,193	Gallacher (2)
26 February 1994	Arsenal	A	0–1	35,030	
5 March 1994	Liverpool	H	2–0	20,831	Wilcox, Sherwood
20 March 1994	Sheffield Wednesday	A	2–1	24,699	Wilcox, Newell
26 March 1994	Swindon Town	H	3–1	20,046	Shearer (2, 1 pen), Sherwood
29 March 1994	Wimbledon	A	1–4	10,537	Wilcox
2 April 1994	Manchester United	H	2–0	20,866	Shearer (2)
4 April 1994	Everton	A	3–0	27,427	Newell (2), Wilcox
11 April 1994	Aston Villa	H	1–0	19,287	Shearer
16 April 1994	Southampton	A	1–3	19,105	Ripley
24 April 1994	Queens Park Rangers	H	1–1	19,913	Shearer
27 April 1994	West Ham United	A	2–1	22,186	Berg, Pearce
2 May 1994	Coventry City	A	1–2	16,653	Le Saux
7 May 1994	Ipswich Town	H	0–0	20,633	

=== FA Cup ===
Round	Date	Opponent	Venue	Result	Attendance	Goalscorers
R3	8 January 1994	Portsmouth	H	3–3	17,219	Gallacher, Shearer, Sherwood
R3R	19 January 1994	Portsmouth	A	3–1	23,035	Shearer, Wilcox, May
R4	29 January 1994	Charlton Athletic	A	0–0	8,532	
R4R	8 February 1994	Charlton Athletic	H	0–1	15,348	

=== League Cup ===
Round	Date	Opponent	Venue	Result	Attendance	Goalscorers
R2 1st leg	21 September 1993	Bournemouth	H	1–0	10,733	Shearer
R2 2nd leg	5 October 1993	Bournemouth	A	0–0 (won 1–0 on agg)	10,321	
R3	26 October 1993	Shrewsbury Town	H	0–0	10,603	
R3R	9 November 1993	Shrewsbury Town	A	4–3	7,330	Newell (2), May, Pearce
R4	1 December 1993	Tottenham Hotspur	A	0–1	22,295	

== Squad ==
Note: Flags indicate national team as defined under FIFA eligibility rules; some limited exceptions apply. Players may hold more than one non-FIFA nationality.

No.	Pos.	Nation	Player
1	GK	ENG	Bobby Mimms
2	DF	ENG	David May
3	DF	ENG	Alan Wright
4	MF	ENG	Tim Sherwood (captain)
5	DF	SCO	Colin Hendry
6	DF	ENG	Graeme Le Saux
7	MF	ENG	Stuart Ripley
8	FW	SCO	Kevin Gallacher
9	FW	ENG	Alan Shearer
10	FW	ENG	Mike Newell
11	MF	ENG	Jason Wilcox
12	DF	ENG	Nicky Marker

No.	Pos.	Nation	Player
13	GK	AUS	Frank Talia
14	MF	ENG	Lee Makel
15	DF	ENG	Richard Brown
18	DF	SCO	Andy Morrison
19	MF	ENG	Simon Ireland
20	DF	NOR	Henning Berg
21	MF	IRL	Kevin Moran
22	MF	ENG	Mark Atkins
23	MF	ENG	David Batty
24	DF	ENG	Paul Warhurst
25	DF	ENG	Ian Pearce
26	GK	ENG	Tim Flowers

=== Left the club during season ===
Note: Flags indicate national team as defined under FIFA eligibility rules; some limited exceptions apply. Players may hold more than one non-FIFA nationality.

No. / Pos. / Nation / Player; 16 / DF / ENG / Tony Dobson (to Portsmouth)	No. / Pos. / Nation / Player; 17 / DF / SWE / Patrik Andersson (to Borussia Mönchengladbach)
