= Jim Traynor =

Scottish former sports journalist

James Traynor (born 27 September 1953) is a Scottish former sports journalist and former Director of Communications at Rangers Football Club. Prior to joining the Glasgow club, Traynor was employed by the Scottish newspaper the Daily Record. He was also presenter of BBC Radio Scotland's football-based phone-in show Your Call.

Traynor was also a pundit on the Superscoreboard show on Radio Clyde for the 2000–2001 season. He also appeared on Scotsport during that season.

In December 2012 he wrote his final article for the Daily Record. Following rumours about a role at Rangers, he took up the position of Director of Communications on 8 December 2012 and resigned on 1 November 2013.

== Personal life ==
For his Daily Record article, titled Secret Fear that Drives Me to Win 10 in a Row, Traynor interviewed the then Rangers chairman Sir David Murray and when he mentioned that the 'most succulent lamb' was the main course of a chat over dinner the phrase was incorporated into popular culture. That phrase has been used by rival fans in Scotland in reference to some journalists writing flattering and uncritical articles about Rangers Football Club in exchange for benefits and priority access to the club's news.
