= Iain Ferguson =

Scottish footballer

Personal information
- Full name: Iain John Ferguson
- Date of birth: 4 August 1962 (age 64)
- Place of birth: Newarthill, Scotland
- Position: Forward

Youth career
- Fir Park Boys Club

Senior career*
| Years | Team | Apps | (Gls) |
| 1978–1984 | Dundee | 119 | (40) |
| 1984–1986 | Rangers | 32 | (6) |
| 1986 | → Dundee (loan) | 3 | (2) |
| 1986–1988 | Dundee United | 75 | (27) |
| 1988–1990 | Heart of Midlothian | 52 | (8) |
| 1989 | → Charlton Athletic (loan) | 1 | (0) |
| 1990 | → Bristol City (loan) | 11 | (2) |
| 1990–1993 | Motherwell | 51 | (10) |
| 1993–1994 | Airdrieonians | 31 | (9) |
| 1994–1996 | Portadown | 39 | (14) |
| 1996–1997 | Dundee | 14 | (1) |
| 1997–1998 | Dundalk | 4 | (0) |
- Gretna
| Total | | 432 | (119) |

International career
| 1982–1983 | Scotland U21 | 3 | (0) |
- * Club domestic league appearances and goals

Iain John Ferguson (born 4 August 1962) is a Scottish former professional football striker. He developed a reputation for scoring important and from his powerful right foot shot, sometimes spectacular goals. He scored in a domestic cup final winning team with both Rangers and Motherwell. His goals against high-profile opponents in Europe include for Dundee United in away games at F.C. Barcelona and Borussia Mönchengladbach en route to his appearance in the 1987 UEFA Cup Final.

From the late 1970s to 1990s he also played for Dundee, Heart of Midlothian, Charlton Athletic, Bristol City, Airdrieonians, Portadown and Dundalk.

== Playing career ==
=== Dundee ===
Ferguson started his professional career with Dundee, who signed him from Fir Park Boys Club in 1978. He flourished at Dens Park scoring his first senior goal at the age of 16. Ferguson stayed behind after training with manager Tommy Gemmell and his assistant Willie Wallace, both Lisbon Lions, to hit shots at Scotland international squad goalkeeper Ally Donaldson. Ferguson later said, "Willie pulled me aside. He said: 'son, I am going to give you a tip. Every time you get a chance, put your head down and hit it as hard as you can, because the ball knows where it is going'. So that's what I did."

He was a first-team regular under Don Mackay as well as a three cap Under-21 internationalist. His right foot shot pulled a goal back for Dundee in the last game of the 1982–83 season derby fixture against Dundee United. United won 2–1 to clinch the Scottish Premier League at Dens Park that day. Among his goals in 1983–84 last season at Dundee he scored five goals against Rangers.

=== Rangers and loan back at Dundee ===
In 1984 Jock Wallace signed him for Rangers for £200,000. He scored the only goal with a low right foot shot from 12 yards in the 1984 Scottish League Cup Final (October) against Dundee United. A few days later he scored two goals in a 3–1 UEFA Cup win against Internazionale of Milan (Rangers lost 4–3 on aggregate). The first was a right foot drive from just outside the penalty area into the top corner of the net. The second was a header from inside the six yard box.

He was already on the sidelines at Ibrox in 1986 and then among the first departures after Graeme Souness' high-profile arrival although he had nutmegged Souness in one of the new player-manager's first training sessions. He was loaned back to Dundee early in the 1986–87 season where he scored twice in three league games.

=== Dundee United ===
Ferguson joined Jim McLean's Dundee United in 1986 paying £145,000 to secure his services after Dundee refused the fee asked by Rangers. In his first season he scored important goals in reaching the 1987 UEFA Cup Final. he was though ineligible for the first three rounds due to the date he signed for United. He headed the winner in the 2–1 defeat of Barcelona at the Camp Nou and the opening goal in the semi-final victory at Borussia Mönchengladbach. Ferguson due to suspension missed the first leg of the final that IFK Goteborg won 1–0. He played in the 1–1 draw return leg at Tannadice.

In his two seasons there Ferguson reached consecutive Scottish Cup finals. He scored his team's first two goals in the 3–2 Scottish Cup semi-final win over his ex-Dundee side at neutral Tynecastle Park. The opener was a right foot shot high into the net from just inside the penalty box. Television commentator Archie MacPherson said in response, "Somebody once said to me about Iain Ferguson, he doesn't score ordinary goals, they are all smashers." In the 1987 Scottish Cup Final Ferguson had an extra time goal disallowed much disputed by him and his teammates. Terry Butcher in the television punditry after initially sitting on the fence regarding the offside decision then said he felt the goal should have stood. Minutes later Ferguson's name sake Ian Ferguson scored the only goal of the game for St Mirren. A year later United lost the final 2–1 to Celtic after Kevin Gallacher had United ahead.

In the 1986–87 Dundee United F.C. season of their UEFA Cup Final appearance they played 67 competitive matches. Ferguson played in 51 of these top scoring for the club with 28 goals. One of these was on 20 December 1986 from 44 yards in a 3–1 win against Hearts. He dispossessed Sandy Jardine before hitting the ball over goalkeeper Henry Smith. He also top scored for United the season after with 16 goals. In the league they finished in third and fifth places respectively in these two seasons. Despite featuring in one of the Tangerines most celebrated sides, Ferguson did not earn silverware in his two seasons with United.

=== Heart of Midlothian and loans at Bristol City and Charlton Athletic ===
In 1988–89 Ferguson equalled Hearts' record transfer fee of £350,000. Alex MacDonald signed him to replace Newcastle United-bound John Robertson. He scored another important goal notching the only strike when Hearts defeated Bayern Munich in the first leg of 1988–89 UEFA Cup quarter finals. He latched on to a free-kick tapped to him by Tosh McKinlay to hit a 25-yard drive past Raimond Aumann into the net described by television commentator Jock Brown as "a shot of stunning power from Iain Ferguson". Ferguson for his part said this goal was his career favourite. Bayern won the return leg 2–0 to go through on aggregate. Robertson returned to Tynecastle only 8 months after his departure meaning Ferguson was largely demoted to the substitutes' bench.

He spent time on loan with Bristol City and Charlton Athletic before leaving in December 1990.

=== Motherwell ===
He helped the Fir Park side win the 1991 Scottish Cup Final. He headed the opening goal as Motherwell defeated his old side Dundee United 4–3 after extra time.

=== Later career ===
During 1993-94 he moved to Lanarkshire rivals Airdrieonians scoring 9 times from his 31 league games.

He next moved mid-season joining Portadown in the Irish League.

In a brief return to Dundee he scored a penalty in a League Cup shoot-out win over ex-club Dundee United at Tannadice in 1996.

Ferguson spent the second half of the 97–98 season in Ireland with Dundalk, where he made four league appearances and one FAI Cup appearance in an injury hit spell.

He then returned to the UK, and played in English non-league football with Gretna.

== After playing ==
Ferguson operated a sports equipment stall at The Forge Shopping Centre in Glasgow. In 2006, he was charged with handling stolen football equipment.

As of February 2017 he was working in car sales.

== Honours ==
Rangers

- Scottish League Cup: winner 1984–85

Dundee United

- UEFA Cup: 1986-87 runner up
- Scottish Cup: runner up 1986–87, 1987–88

Motherwell

- Scottish Cup: winner 1990–91

== See also ==
- Dundee United F.C. season 1986-87
- Dundee United F.C. season 1987-88
