= Ian McPhee (footballer) =

Scottish footballer

Personal information
- Full name: Ian McPhee
- Date of birth: 31 January 1961 (age 65)
- Place of birth: Perth, Scotland
- Position: Midfielder

Youth career
- 1976–1978: Celtic

Senior career*
Years	Team	Apps	(Gls)
1978–1987	Forfar Athletic	313	(32)
1987–1988	Dundee United	12	(2)
1988–1991	Airdrieonians	83	(5)
1991–1998	Forfar Athletic	152	(11)
Total		560	(50)

Managerial career
- 1996–2000: Forfar Athletic
- * Club domestic league appearances and goals

Ian McPhee (born 31 January 1961 in Perth, Scotland) is a Scottish former professional footballer who spent most of his career with Forfar Athletic.

== Career ==
McPhee was with Celtic as a youth but failed to make a senior appearance and moved to Forfar, where he spent nine years. McPhee moved to Dundee United in his mid-twenties but managed only a dozen league appearances during his time at Tannadice and dropped down a division to join Airdrieonians partway through the 1988–89 season. McPhee featured in over eighty league matches for the Diamonds before rejoining Forfar in 1991. McPhee became player/manager in 1996, taking over from Tommy Campbell. During his four-year managerial spell, McPhee achieved promotion in the remainder of his first season and kept them in the Second Division the following season. The club were relegated in the 1998–99 season but McPhee won promotion at the first time of asking. In November 2000, with the club lying bottom, McPhee ended his long association with the Loons by "mutual consent".

== Honours ==
=== Manager ===
Forfar Athletic

- Scottish Third Division promotion : 1996–97
- Forfarshire Cup : 1997–98
