= Kevin Gallacher =

Scottish footballer and pundit

Personal information
- Full name: Kevin William Gallacher
- Date of birth: 23 November 1966 (age 59)
- Place of birth: Clydebank, Scotland
- Height: 1.73 m (5 ft 8 in)
- Positions: Winger; striker

Youth career
- Duntocher Boys Club
- 1983–1985: Dundee United

Senior career*
Years	Team	Apps	(Gls)
1985–1990	Dundee United	131	(26)
1990–1993	Coventry City	100	(28)
1993–1999	Blackburn Rovers	144	(46)
1999–2001	Newcastle United	39	(4)
2001–2002	Preston North End	5	(1)
2002	Sheffield Wednesday	4	(0)
2002	Huddersfield Town	7	(0)
Total		430	(105)

International career
1986–1989	Scotland U21	7	(3)
1988–2001	Scotland	53	(9)
1990	Scotland B	2	(0)
- * Club domestic league appearances and goals

Kevin William Gallacher (born 23 November 1966) is a Scottish football pundit and commentator and former professional player.

He played as a forward from 1983 until 2002, notably in the Premier League with Blackburn Rovers where he was part of the title-winning squad in 1994–95. He also played in the top flight for Coventry City and Newcastle United as well as in the Scottish Premier League for Dundee United and in the Football League for Preston North End, Sheffield Wednesday and Huddersfield Town. He made 53 appearances for Scotland, scoring 9 goals and was part of their Euro 92, Euro 96 and World Cup 98 squads.

== Club career ==
Gallacher started his Scottish League career with Dundee United, where he spent seven years as part of a successful team under the guidance of Jim McLean. He made his first team debut in December 1985 aged 19 years old in a UEFA Cup tie against Neuchâtel Xamax and three days later played against Rangers at Ibrox. He soon established himself in the side with his fast and penetrating wing play. He helped United reach the 1987 UEFA Cup final, scoring against Barcelona in the quarter-finals en route. United, however, lost on aggregate to IFK Göteborg. The following year, Gallacher scored Dundee United's goal in the 1988 Scottish Cup final, in the 2–1 defeat by Celtic. A week later he made his full international debut for Scotland against Colombia.

Gallacher moved to Coventry City in January 1990 for a transfer fee of £950,000 and became a fans favourite for three years. Having played for most of his career to date as a winger, Gallacher was used as a striker for most of his time at Highfield Road, and was the club's top scorer in seasons 1990–91 and 1991–92.

He then joined Blackburn Rovers in March 1993 for £1.5 million, as they looked to fill the gap up front left by the long-term injury absence of Alan Shearer. He made an immediate impact, scoring on his debut in a 4–1 win over Liverpool. However, two broken legs (the second sustained in his first game after the original injury) the following season restricted him to just one Premier League game in 1994–95 when Blackburn won the FA Premier League. He did score in that game, a 2–1 win against Crystal Palace.

Gallacher returned to full effectiveness in 1996–97, however, scoring 10 goals to help avoid a relegation scare. In 1997–98, he formed a potent partnership with Chris Sutton, scoring 16 goals himself as Blackburn finished 6th. However, injuries and inconsistencies meant he missed much of 1998–99, although he was the team's top goalscorer with five goals. Blackburn were relegated in 1999, just four seasons after having won the title.

Gallacher then moved to Newcastle United, becoming Bobby Robson's first signing as Newcastle manager. He was mostly used as a right winger, a role he adapted to well, and despite a lack of goals, was fairly popular with the Newcastle fans for his work rate.

Spells at Preston North End (where he scored twice against Kidderminster Harriers and Sheffield United), Sheffield Wednesday and Huddersfield Town followed before hanging up his boots in 2002, ending a career which had seen him score a total of 106 goals in 430 games in the English and Scottish leagues.

== International career ==
Gallacher won 53 caps for Scotland and was in the squads for the Euro 92, Euro 96, and 1998 FIFA World Cup tournaments. He scored nine goals for his country, six of them in 1998 World Cup qualification, a significant contribution to the successful campaign which included perhaps his most famous international goals, a double against Austria at Celtic Park in 1997.

== Media career ==
Gallacher has worked as a co-commentator and studio analyst for BBC Radio Lancashire, BBC Radio 5 Live, Sky Sports, Setanta Sports, BBC Scotland and Channel 5. In addition to this, he is also a columnist in the Lancashire Telegraph. In 2006, he published a book, Tartan Turmoil: The Fall & Rise of Scottish Football, a semi-autobiographical look at the problems faced by Scottish football. In 2010, he started working for ITV, commentating on FA Cup games.

== Personal life ==
Gallacher is the grandson of the late Celtic forward Patsy Gallacher, who died before Kevin was born. His uncles Willie and Tommy were also footballers as is his niece Amy. The Gallachers are also related to another footballing branch of the family, John Divers and his son of the same name who both played for Celtic.

== Career statistics ==
=== Club ===
Appearances and goals by club, season and competition
Club	Season	League			National cup (Note: Includes Scottish Cup, FA Cup)		League cup (Note: Includes Scottish League Cup, Football League Cup)		Other		Total	
Club	Season	Division	Apps	Goals	Apps	Goals	Apps	Goals	Apps	Goals	Apps	Goals
Dundee United	1985–86	Premier Division	20	3	3	0	0	0	1 (Note: Appearance(s) in UEFA Cup)	0	24	3
Dundee United	1986–87	Scottish Premier Division	37	10	6	3	4	2	10	1	57	16
Dundee United	1987–88	Scottish Premier Division	26	4	8	1	3	1	2	1	39	7
Dundee United	1988–89	Scottish Premier League	31	9	5	1	4	2	4 (Note: Appearances in European Cup Winners' Cup)	0	44	12
Dundee United	1989–90	Scottish Premier League	17	1	1	0	2	0	4	1	24	2
Dundee United	Total		131	27	23	5	13	5	21	3	188	40
Coventry City	1989–90	First Division	15	3	0	0	2	0	—		17	3
Coventry City	1990–91	First Division	32	11	2	0	3	5	1 (Note: Appearances in Full Members' Cup)	0	38	16
Coventry City	1991–92	First Division	33	8	1	0	4	2	1	0	39	10
Coventry City	1992–93	FA Premier League	20	6	1	0	2	0	—		23	6
Coventry City	Total		100	28	4	0	11	7	2	0	117	35
Blackburn Rovers	1992–93	FA Premier League	9	5	—		—		—		9	5
Blackburn Rovers	1993–94	FA Premier League	30	7	4	1	4	0	—		38	8
Blackburn Rovers	1994–95	FA Premier League	1	1	0	0	0	0	0	0	1	1
Blackburn Rovers	1995–96	FA Premier League	16	2	2	0	0	0	2 (Note: One appearance in FA Charity Shield, one in UEFA Champions League)	0	20	2
Blackburn Rovers	1996–97	FA Premier League	34	10	2	0	3	1	—		39	11
Blackburn Rovers	1997–98	FA Premier League	33	16	4	3	1	1	—		38	20
Blackburn Rovers	1998–99	FA Premier League	16	4	1	0	1	0	0	0	18	4
Blackburn Rovers	1999–2000	First Division	5	0	—		1	1	—		6	1
Blackburn Rovers	Total		144	45	13	4	10	3	2	0	169	52
Newcastle United	1999–2000	FA Premier League	20	2	5	1	—		0	0	25	3
Newcastle United	2000–01	FA Premier League	19	2	1	0	2	1	—		22	3
Newcastle United	Total		39	4	6	1	2	1	—		47	6
Preston North End	2001–02	First Division	5	1	0	0	1	1	—		6	2
Sheffield Wednesday	2001–02	First Division	4	0	—		—		—		4	0
Huddersfield Town	2002–03	Second Division	7	0	0	0	1	0	—		8	0
Career total			430	105	46	10	38	17	25	3	539	135

=== International ===
Appearances

Scotland national team
Year	Apps	Goals
1988	4	0
1991	3	0
1992	7	0
1993	5	2
1996	5	0
1997	10	6
1998	7	0
1999	6	0
2000	4	1
2001	2	0
Total	53	9

Scores and results list Scotland's goal tally first

#	Date	Venue	Opponent	Score	Result	Competition
1	19 May 1993	Kadrioru Stadium, Tallinn	Estonia	1–0	3–0	1994 FIFA World Cup qualification
2	13 October 1993	Stadio Olimpico, Rome	Italy	1–2	1–3	1994 FIFA World Cup qualification
3	2 April 1997	Celtic Park, Glasgow	Austria	1–0	2–0	1998 FIFA World Cup qualification
4	2 April 1997	Celtic Park, Glasgow	Austria	2–0	2–0	1998 FIFA World Cup qualification
5	30 April 1997	Ullevi Stadion, Gothenburg	Sweden	1–2	1–2	1998 FIFA World Cup qualification
6	7 September 1997	Pittodrie, Aberdeen	Belarus	1–0	4–1	1998 FIFA World Cup qualification
7	7 September 1997	Pittodrie, Aberdeen	Belarus	3–0	4–1	1998 FIFA World Cup qualification
8	11 October 1997	Celtic Park, Glasgow	Latvia	1–0	2–0	1998 FIFA World Cup qualification
9	11 October 2000	Maksimir Stadion, Zagreb	Croatia	1–1	1–1	2002 FIFA World Cup qualification

== Honours ==
Dundee United

UEFA Cup: runners-up 1986–87

Blackburn Rovers

Premier League: 1994–95

Individual

Scottish FA International Roll of Honour: 2000

== See also ==
- List of Blackburn Rovers F.C. players
- List of Coventry City F.C. players
- List of Dundee United F.C. players
- List of Scotland national football team captains
- List of Scottish football families
