= Charlie Adam (footballer, born 1962) =

Scottish footballer

Personal information
- Full name: Charles Adam
- Date of birth: 5 April 1962
- Place of birth: Dundee, Scotland
- Date of death: 17 December 2012 (aged 50)
- Place of death: Dundee, Scotland
- Position: Midfielder

Youth career
- Timex Amateurs

Senior career*
Years	Team	Apps	(Gls)
1982–1983	Montrose	8	(0)
1983–1985	Dundee Downfield		
1985–1986	St Johnstone	28	(8)
1986–1989	Brechin City	97	(35)
1989	Dundee United	6	(0)
1989	Partick Thistle	8	(2)
1989–1991	Forfar Athletic	36	(7)
1991–1994	Arbroath	81	(10)
- Dundee St. Joseph's
Total		264	(62)
- * Club domestic league appearances and goals

Charles Adam (5 April 1962 – 17 December 2012) was a Scottish footballer who played as a midfielder.

Adam played for a number of Scottish clubs, including St Johnstone and Dundee United, starting his career at Montrose. His sons Charlie and Grant are also professional footballers.

== Personal life ==
Adam was married to Eleanor (d. 2020), with whom he had five children, including Charlie and Grant.

== Death ==
Adam died in 2012, aged 50. The cause of death was suicide.
