= Paul Kinnaird =

Scottish footballer and fitness coach

Personal information
- Full name: Paul Kinnaird
- Date of birth: 11 November 1966 (age 59)
- Place of birth: Glasgow, Scotland
- Height: 1.73 m (5 ft 8 in)
- Position: Winger

Youth career
- 1984–1986: Norwich City

Senior career*
Years	Team	Apps	(Gls)
1986–1987	Dundee United	18	(0)
1987–1988	Motherwell	34	(0)
1988–1991	St Mirren	57	(4)
1991–1993	Partick Thistle	33	(3)
1992–1993	→ Shrewsbury Town (loan)	4	(0)
1993	St Johnstone	3	(0)
1993	→ Partick Thistle (loan)	3	(0)
1993–1995	Derry City	32	(2)
1994	→ Bohemians (loan)	12	(1)
1995	Partick Thistle	0	(0)
1995	Dunfermline Athletic	9	(0)
1995	Scarborough	3	(0)
1995–1997	Ayr United	45	(4)
1997	Leiftur	7	(0)
1997–1999	Stranraer	53	(5)
1998	→ Leiftur (loan)	11	(0)
1999–2000	Ross County	47	(8)
1999	→ Leiftur (loan)	1	(0)
2000–2001	Queen of the South	6	(0)
2001	Brechin City	13	(0)
2001	Partick Thistle	0	(0)
2001	Clydebank	4	(0)
2001–2002	Irvine Meadow XI		
2002–2003	Muirkirk		
- * Club domestic league appearances and goals

Paul Kinnaird (born 11 November 1966) is a Scottish former footballer. He is now a fitness coach and has worked with Ayr United.

His previous clubs include Norwich City, Dundee United, Motherwell, St Mirren and Partick Thistle, before briefly visiting England to play four times for Shrewsbury Town. A return to his homeland saw him play for St Johnstone, then move to Northern Ireland to play for Derry City in the League of Ireland. He made his League of Ireland debut on 17 October 1993 and scored 2 goals in 20 league appearances for Derry.

He then had brief spells with Dunfermline and Scarborough in 1995. He moved to Ayr United, who released him in May 1997. After a short spell in Iceland with Leiftur, Paul resurrected his career with Stranraer, scoring regularly in the Scottish First Division. In March 1999, he dropped two divisions to join Ross County. However, he faced his former colleagues at Stranraer next season as Ross gained promotion from the Third Division whilst Stranraer were relegated into Division Two.

Freed by Ross in the summer of 2000, Paul was linked with a transfer to Partick Thistle in September 2000 but instead joined Queen of the South in November 2000. Kinnaird moved to Brechin City in March 2001. Released at the end of the season, Paul contacted Partick to see if he could train with them and impressing their assistant manager, was set to join them for the fourth time. He later moved on to Clydebank and then to junior football sides Irvine Meadow and Muirkirk Juniors. In January 2003, he nearly joined Linlithgow Rose but the transfer fell through.
