= Billy Thomson (footballer, born 1958) =

Scottish footballer (1958–2023)

Personal information
- Full name: William Marshall Thomson
- Date of birth: 10 February 1958
- Place of birth: Linwood, Scotland
- Date of death: 6 February 2023 (aged 64)
- Position: Goalkeeper

Senior career*
Years	Team	Apps	(Gls)
1975–1978	Partick Thistle	1	(0)
1978–1984	St Mirren	206	(0)
1984–1991	Dundee United	165	(0)
1990	→ Clydebank (loan)	2	(0)
1991–1994	Motherwell	52	(0)
1994–1996	Rangers	6	(0)
1996–1997	Dundee	25	(0)
Total		457	(0)

International career
1977–1980	Scotland Under-21	10	(0)
1980	Scottish League XI	1	(0)
1980–1983	Scotland	7	(0)
- * Club domestic league appearances and goals

William Marshall Thomson (10 February 1958 – February 2023) was a Scottish footballer who played as a goalkeeper. Thomson played for Partick Thistle, St Mirren, Dundee United, Clydebank, Motherwell, Rangers and Dundee. He played for Dundee United in the 1987 UEFA Cup Final and two Scottish Cup finals. He won seven international caps for Scotland between 1980 and 1983.

Thomson was a goalkeeping coach with Dundee, Rangers, Kilmarnock and Stranraer.

== Playing career ==
=== Partick Thistle ===
Thomson started his pro career at Partick Thistle. The youngster was highly regarded and given first team experience in League Cup and Glasgow Cup games. He also collected his first two Scotland under 21 caps. In August 1978 a bid was made for him of £50,000 that was considered remarkable for a 20-year-old reserve at a relatively unfashionable club at the time. Thistle accepted the bid. He played only once on league duty there as understudy to Alan Rough.

=== St Mirren ===
Jim Clunie signed the 20-year-old for St Mirren for £50,000 in August 1978. He played for the Paisley club for six seasons, making 317 first team appearances. His debut was against Dumbarton in the League Cup. He broke through to the Scotland squad and was to collect seven full caps, all while with the Saints. Thomson enjoyed good form at club level, being well remembered particularly for UEFA Cup saves from AS Saint-Étienne's Johnny Rep and Laurent Roussey.

In season 1983–84 he was fined by St Mirren for critical remarks regarding wages and conditions. Alex Miller was manager and said Thomson would never play for Saints again. Thomson was sold for £75,000 in June 1984.

=== Dundee United ===
Thomson signed for Jim McLean at Dundee United in 1984 and spent the first season as cover for Hamish McAlpine. Thomson began the 1984–85 season as first choice. However McAlpine had re-established himself in the team by the end of September. After injury to McAlpine in October 1985, Thomson took over in goal in October 1985 and was first choice until the early 1990s.

United made it to the final of the 1986–87 UEFA Cup. En route they defeated Terry Venables' F.C. Barcelona side featuring Gary Lineker and Mark Hughes home and away in the quarter-final, and in the return leg of the semi-final against Borussia Mönchengladbach they inflicted a first home defeat on the opposition in Europe in 55 games, going back to 1970. In the final against Göteborg, Thomson was injured after five minutes of the first leg diving at the feet of Lennart Nilsson and needed five stitches for a blow just behind his left ear. Some reports said Thomson almost lost his ear. Thomson though repelled attack after attack and was beaten only once when Stefan Pettersson scored. McLean described Thomson's performance as "magnificent". Despite Clark scoring in the final in the 1–1 second leg draw at Tannadice, United lost 2–1 on aggregate.

Thomson also played in two consecutive Scottish Cup Finals for United in 1987 and 1988, though both resulted in narrow defeats (the first to former club St Mirren). In the 1987 semi-final 3–2 win against Dundee, Thomson pulled off numerous saves in a display described in The Guardian as "fantastic". Thomson eventually lost his place to Alan Main who played in goals in the 1991 Scottish Cup Final 4–3 defeat to Motherwell.

=== Later playing career ===
Thomson left Dundee United for Motherwell in 1991 for a £50,000 fee, spending three years with the Steelmen in which he replaced Ally Maxwell but then lost his place to Sieb Dijkstra. Aged 36, he moved to Rangers where the experienced keeper spent two years as backup to Andy Goram. His final club was Dundee.

=== International ===
Thomson made his full international debut for Scotland, against Northern Ireland in Belfast on 16 May 1980. Scotland lost 1–0 to a goal from Billy Hamilton. Thomson was mainly second choice goalkeeper, to Alan Rough, during this period. His next two caps were also against Northern Ireland (the middle of the three was a 1982 FIFA World Cup qualifier and not the Home Internationals). Hamilton gave the Irish the lead in the 70th minute. John Wark equalised in a 1–1 draw.

With Scotland already qualified for the 1982 FIFA World Cup, Thomson played in the last qualifier against Portugal in Lisbon. Scotland lost 2–1 despite Paul Sturrock scoring the opening goal. Thomson didn't make the squad for the finals, with Jock Stein selecting Rough, George Wood and a then uncapped Jim Leighton.

His fifth cap was another Home International match against Northern Ireland, which ended goalless. He also played in a 2–0 win in Vancouver against Canada. His seventh and last cap was in another dead rubber when Scotland finished their poor UEFA Euro 1984 qualifying campaign. They lost 2–1 to East Germany in Halle, with Eamonn Bannon scoring the Scottish goal.

== Coaching and later life ==
After retiring, Thomson joined Dundee's coaching staff before returning to Rangers as goalkeeping coach in May 2001, remaining there until his departure in August 2007. Two months later, Thomson took up a similar, part-time role with Kilmarnock.

Thomson became goalkeeping coach of Stranraer in June 2021, shortly after leaving Kilmarnock.

Thomson died on 6 February 2023, at the age of 64.

== Career statistics ==
Appearances and goals by club, season and competition
Club	Season	League		National cup		League cup		Other		Total	
Club	Season	Apps	Goals	Apps	Goals	Apps	Goals	Apps	Goals	Apps	Goals
St Mirren	1978–79	34	0							34	0
St Mirren	1979–80	36	0							36	0
St Mirren	1980–81	36	0							36	0
St Mirren	1981–82	35	0							35	0
St Mirren	1982–83	35	0							35	0
St Mirren	1983–84	30	0							30	0
St Mirren	Total	206	0							206	0
Dundee United	1984–85	11	0	0	0	3	0	1	0	15	0
Dundee United	1985–86	28	0	5	0	0	0	5	0	38	0
Dundee United	1986–87	39	0	6	0	4	0	12	0	61	0
Dundee United	1987–88	36	0	7	0	3	0	4	0	50	0
Dundee United	1988–89	35	0	6	0	4	0	4	0	49	0
Dundee United	1989–90	7	0	0	0	1	0	3	0	11	0
Dundee United	1990–91	5	0	0	0	3	0	2	0	10	0
Dundee United	Total	161	0	24	0	18	0	31	0	234	0
Motherwell	1991–92	43	0							43	0
Motherwell	1992–93	9	0							9	0
Motherwell	1993–94	0	0							0	0
Motherwell	Total	52	0							52	0
Rangers	1994–95	5	0	0	0	0	0	0	0	5	0
Rangers	1995–96	1	0	0	0	0	0	1	0	2	0
Rangers	Total	6	0	0	0	0	0	1	0	7	0
Dundee	1995–96	25	0	2	0	2	0	0	0	4	0
Career total		454	0	26	0	20	0	32	0	532	0

== Honours ==
Dundee United

- UEFA Cup: runner-up 1986–87
- Scottish Cup: runner-up: 1986–87, 1987–88
