= Harry Curran =

Scottish footballer (born 1966)

Personal information
- Full name: Henry Curran
- Date of birth: 9 October 1966 (age 60)
- Place of birth: Glasgow, Scotland
- Position: Midfielder

Senior career*
Years	Team	Apps	(Gls)
1984–1987	Dumbarton	16	(0)
1987–1989	Dundee United	11	(0)
1989–1995	St Johnstone	204	(35)
1995–1996	Partick Thistle	7	(1)
1996–1998	Dunfermline Athletic	31	(3)
1998–2001	Greenock Morton	92	(16)
2001–2002	Alloa Athletic	31	(4)
2002–2004	Stranraer	16	(0)
Total		406	(58)
- * Club domestic league appearances and goals as of 09:12, 29 March 2007 (UTC)

Henry Curran (born 9 October 1966 in Glasgow) is a Scottish former professional footballer who played in midfield for a number of Scottish clubs.

== Career ==
Curren began his career with Dumbarton in 1984. In three years with the club, he made sixteen league appearances. In 1987, he joined Dundee United, for whom he made eleven league appearances.

He joined United's Tayside rivals St Johnstone for £50,000 in 1989. He made 204 league appearances for the Perth club, scoring 35 league goals.

In 1995, after six years with Saints, he signed for Partick Thistle, making seven league appearances and scoring one goal.

In March 1996, Curran joined Dunfermline Athletic for £25,000, before moving on to Greenock Morton, Alloa Athletic and Stranraer, with whom he retired in 2004 after a twenty-year career.

== Honours ==
=== St Johnstone ===
- Scottish Football League First Division: 1

1989–90
