= Allan Preston =

Scottish footballer, manager, and radio sports pundit

Personal information
- Date of birth: 16 August 1969 (age 57)
- Place of birth: Leith, Scotland
- Position: Defender

Youth career
- 1985–1987: Dundee United

Senior career*
Years	Team	Apps	(Gls)
1987–1992	Dundee United	24	(1)
1992–1993	Heart of Midlothian	21	(2)
1993–1994	Dunfermline Athletic	26	(5)
1994–2000	St Johnstone	144	(7)
2000	Queen of the South	8	(1)
Total		223	(16)

Managerial career
- 2004: Livingston
- * Club domestic league appearances and goals

Allan Preston (born 16 August 1969) is a Scottish retired professional footballer and manager. He is currently a radio sports pundit for BBC Scotland.

== Playing career ==
Preston, who predominantly played at left-back, began his career as a 15-year-old with Dundee United in 1985. He made his league debut in the 1987/88 season. After spending several years at Tannadice, he signed for Hearts, the team he supported as a boy. After brief spells with Hearts and Dunfermline Athletic he joined St Johnstone in 1994. It was in Perth that he played the most consistent football of his career.

== Management and coaching ==
In June 2000, after a hip injury ended his playing career, Preston became assistant to Macclesfield Town manager Peter Davenport, whom he had played with at St Johnstone. Preston left Macclesfield within a year to return to Scotland with Livingston as a coach, and in June 2004 he became the club's manager. He brought in another former St Johnstone teammate, Alan Kernaghan, as his assistant, Kernagahan had been player/manager at Clyde. In November 2004, after just fifteen games in charge, Preston and Kernaghan were sacked after the team's seventh successive defeat.

Preston was unsuccessful in his application to be St Johnstone manager in April 2005.

== Other professional interests ==
Preston works as a football agent for ICM Stellar Sports.

Preston has been a pundit on BBC Radio Scotland's Sportsound since 2008 and is nicknamed Biscuits.
