= Joe McLeod =

Scottish footballer

Personal information
- Date of birth: 30 December 1967 (age 58)
- Place of birth: Edinburgh, Scotland
- Position: Left midfielder

Youth career
- Dundee United

Senior career*
Years	Team	Apps	(Gls)
1986–1990	Dundee United	17	(1)
1987	→ Dumbarton (loan)	5	(0)
1990–1993	Motherwell	46	(1)
1993	Portadown		
1993–1997	Stirling Albion	86	(10)
1998	Berwick Rangers	12	(0)
Total		166	(12)

International career
1988–1989	Scotland under-21	2	(0)
- * Club domestic league appearances and goals

Joseph McLeod (born 30 December 1967 in Edinburgh) is a Scottish former footballer who played as a left midfielder.

== Career ==
McLeod came through the youth ranks at Dundee United but managed only seventeen appearances in a four-year spell, which included a loan period with Dumbarton. In 1990, McLeod moved to Motherwell, managing nearly fifty league appearances over a three-year period. In 1993, McLeod had a brief spell in Northern Ireland with Portadown before moving back to Scotland in December 1993 with Stirling Albion. In 1998, McLeod moved to Berwick Rangers where he finished his playing career in November.

As a youth, McLeod was a runner-up in the Under-18 European Championship with Scotland in 1986.

McLeod is now a maintenance operative with Scottish Water in Edinburgh.

== Honours ==
- Under-18 European Championship runner-up: 1

1986
