= Gordon McLeod (footballer) =

Scottish footballer

Personal information
- Full name: Gordon McLeod
- Date of birth: 2 September 1967 (age 59)
- Place of birth: Edinburgh, Scotland
- Position: Midfielder

Senior career*
Years	Team	Apps	(Gls)
1984–1988	Dundee United	27	(3)
1988–1990	Airdrieonians	9	(1)
1990–1992	Dundee	66	(2)
1992–1995	Meadowbank Thistle	94	(13)
1995–1998	Livingston	63	(13)
- Bonnyrigg Rose
Total		259	(32)
- * Club domestic league appearances and goals

Gordon McLeod (born 2 September 1967 in Edinburgh) is a Scottish former footballer who played as a midfielder.

== Career ==
McLeod came through the youth ranks at Dundee United but managed only 27 appearances in a five-year spell. In 1988, McLeod moved to Airdrieonians, managing just nine league appearances before moving back to Tayside with United's rivals, Dundee. McLeod was a regular during his time at Dens Park, playing in nearly 70 league matches during his two years there before moving back to his hometown Edinburgh in 1992 with Meadowbank Thistle. McLeod stayed with Meadowbank through their restructuring as Livingston in 1995 and remained with the club until 1998, where he moved to Bonnyrigg Rose. As a youth, McLeod was a runner-up in the Under-18 European Championship with Scotland in 1986.

McLeod is now a sales rep for a wholesaler in Edinburgh. He has 2 children. He is famed for his Poodle related Facebook messages, posted on Fridays, celebrating the upcoming weekend.

== Honours ==
- Under-18 European Championship runner-up: 1

1986

- Scottish Third Division: 1

1995–96
