= Alan Irvine (footballer, born 1958) =

Scottish football manager (born 1958)

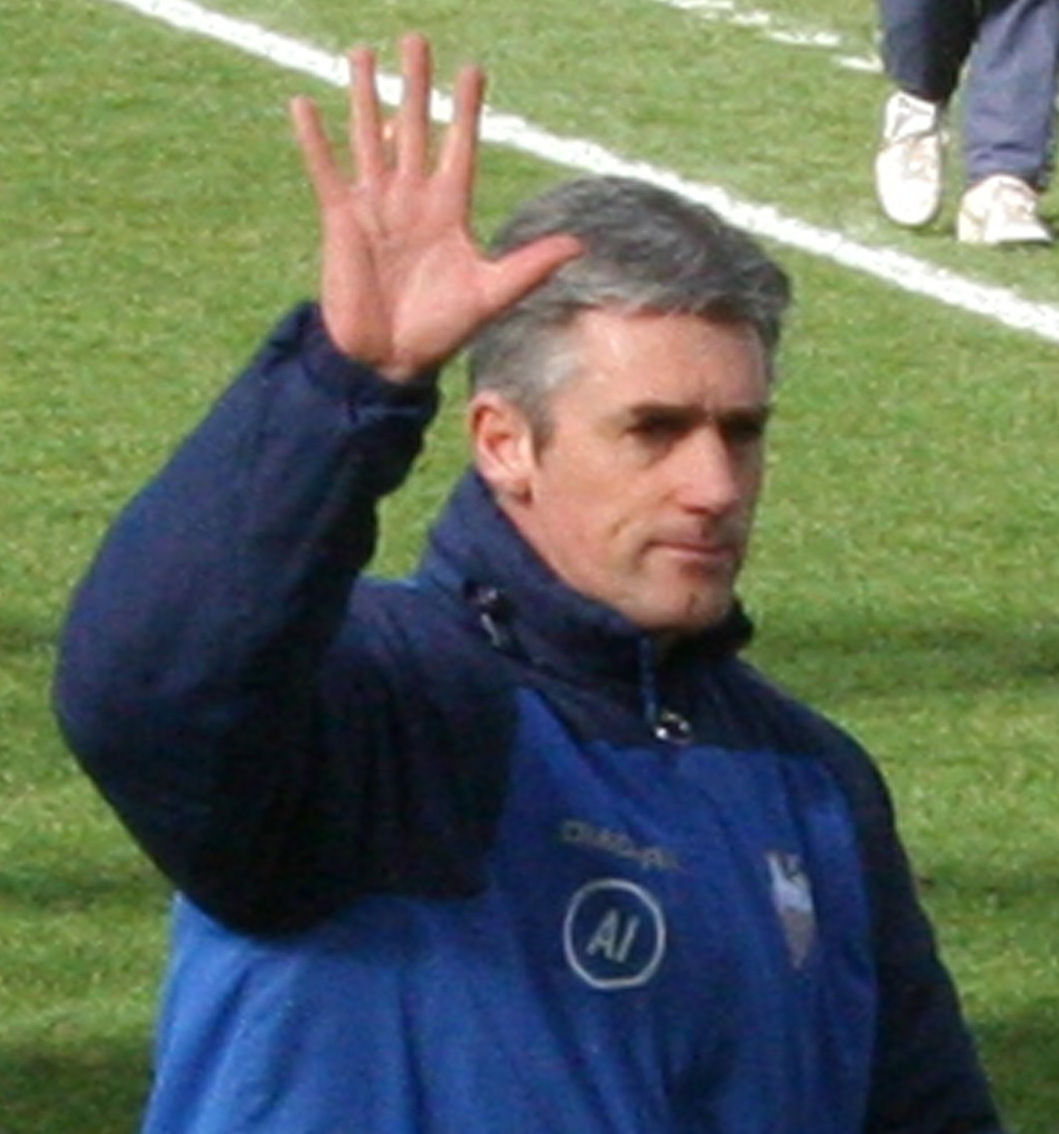
- Irvine as Preston North End manager in 2008

Personal information
- Full name: James Alan Irvine
- Date of birth: 12 July 1958 (age 68)
- Place of birth: Glasgow, Scotland
- Height: 5 ft 8 in (1.73 m)
- Position: Winger

Team information
- Current team: Everton (assistant manager)

Senior career*
| Years | Team | Apps | (Gls) |
| 1977–1981 | Queen's Park | 88 | (9) |
| 1981–1984 | Everton | 60 | (4) |
| 1984–1987 | Crystal Palace | 109 | (12) |
| 1987–1989 | Dundee United | 24 | (3) |
| 1989–1992 | Blackburn Rovers | 58 | (3) |
| Total | | 339 | (31) |

Managerial career
- 2007–2009: Preston North End
- 2010–2011: Sheffield Wednesday
- 2014: West Bromwich Albion
- 2017: Norwich City (interim)
- * Club domestic league appearances and goals

James Alan Irvine (born 12 July 1958) is a Scottish former professional footballer and coach. He is currently assistant manager of Premier League club Everton and the Scottish national team.

Irvine played as a winger for Queen's Park, Everton, Crystal Palace, Dundee United and Blackburn Rovers.

As a coach, Irvine worked in various roles at Blackburn Rovers, Preston North End, Newcastle United and Everton before becoming a manager, firstly with Preston and then Sheffield Wednesday. After three years in charge of the Everton Academy, he became head coach of West Bromwich Albion. He rejoined Blackburn as assistant manager in November 2015, and was later caretaker manager of Norwich City and assistant manager at West Ham United. In 2025, he returned to Everton as assistant manager.

== Early life ==
Born in Glasgow, Scotland, Irvine studied for qualification as an insurance broker whilst playing for Queen's Park. Irvine is a boyhood Leeds United fan, citing fellow Scot Eddie Gray as his favourite player.

== Club career ==
After Queen's Park, Irvine went on to play for Everton, Crystal Palace, Dundee United and Blackburn Rovers.

He helped Everton win the 1983–84 FA Cup: despite being left out of the final match day squad, he had started all 7 previous FA cup matches up to and including the semi-final, scoring goals in the 3rd round and 5th round ties. Irvine also started the 1984 League Cup Final and League Cup Final Replay with Everton ultimately losing 1–0 to Liverpool.

In 1992, he was part of the Blackburn team that won promotion to the new FA Premier League. He announced his retirement from playing just before the 1992–93 season began.

== Coaching career ==
Irvine returned to Goodison Park to join the coaching staff 20 years after leaving as a player. He was academy director at Blackburn Rovers and Newcastle United, where he was credited with bringing through players such as Steven Taylor and Peter Ramage. Damien Duff has described Alan Irvine as being "the best coach" he worked under.

=== Preston North End ===
Irvine took over as manager of Preston North End on 20 November 2007 with Preston in a relegation battle. He guided Preston to a respectable 15th place in the 2007–08 season. In his first full season in charge, Irvine led Preston to the play-offs when on a dramatic final day of the season, after Preston clinched the final play-off spot thanks to goals from Jon Parkin and Sean St. Ledger. After that he was named the Championship Manager of the Month for April. Preston lost their play-off semi-final to Sheffield United 2–1 on aggregate. He was dismissed on 29 December 2009 after Preston suffered a poor run of results where the team only won once in 10 games.

=== Sheffield Wednesday ===
Irvine was appointed manager of Sheffield Wednesday on 8 January 2010. Wednesday got off to a good start under Irvine, winning games against Barnsley, Blackpool and Peterborough United. Irvine was named Championship Manager of the month for January 2010. This form was not sustained, however, as on the last day of the season Wednesday faced a Hillsborough relegation showdown against Crystal Palace who had suffered a 10-point deduction, needing a home win to avoid relegation. The match ended in a 2–2 draw, relegating Wednesday to League One.

Wednesday then had severe financial issues, with the club appearing in court twice over winding up orders. Following the successful takeover by Milan Mandarić at the end of 2010, Irvine was allowed transfer funds to revamp his squad. Despite making several new signings, the team continued to have consistently poor results. On 3 February 2011, Wednesday dismissed Irvine with the side lying 12th in League One.

It was announced on 12 July 2011 that Irvine had returned to Everton to replace Ray Hall as the manager of the club's academy.

=== West Bromwich Albion ===
On 14 June 2014 West Bromwich Albion announced that Irvine would fill their vacant head coach role on a 12-month rolling contract, his first management work in the Premier League.

In his first league match in charge on 16 August, West Bromwich Albion drew 2–2 at home against Sunderland. It was not until his fifth league match, on 21 September, that they won a league match, James Morrison heading the only goal to defeat Tottenham Hotspur at White Hart Lane. A week later, he got his first home league victory, 4–0 against Burnley at The Hawthorns. It was the team's biggest league win since 2012 and moved them up seven places in the league to 10th. Irvine's time in charge also saw West Bromwich Albion forward Saido Berahino called into the senior England team after scoring seven goals in ten league matches.

After only seven months in the role, on 29 December 2014, Irvine was dismissed by West Bromwich Albion, with the team lying in 16th position in the Premier League having won only four of 19 league games under his managership, and just one point above the relegation zone.

=== Norwich City ===
On 2 July 2016, Irvine joined Norwich City as assistant manager. He took over as caretaker manager on 10 March 2017 after Alex Neil was dismissed. On 25 May 2017 Daniel Farke took over on a permanent basis, and Irvine left the club.

=== West Ham United ===
In November 2017, Irvine was named as an assistant to David Moyes at West Ham United; the pair had worked together at Preston and Everton. Irvine left West Ham at the end of the 2017–18 season, after Moyes' contract was not renewed. Irvine rejoined West Ham on 30 December 2019 following Moyes' reappointment as the club's manager. Irvine was replaced by Billy McKinlay as West Ham United's assistant manager in May 2021 and switched to a technical advisory role. Moyes commented on Irvine's role saying "We have Alan who is always watching and analysing the opposition for us".

=== Everton ===
In January 2025, Irvine returned for a second stint on the coaching staff at Everton, again as assistant to David Moyes.

== Managerial statistics ==
As of match played 7 May 2017

Managerial record by team and tenure
| Team | From | To | Record | | | | | Ref |
| Team | From | To | P | W | D | L | Win % | Ref |
|---|---|---|---|---|---|---|---|---|
| Preston North End | 20 November 2007 | 29 December 2009 | 110 | 45 | 25 | 40 | 40.9 | |
| Sheffield Wednesday | 8 January 2010 | 3 February 2011 | 59 | 24 | 13 | 22 | 40.7 | |
| West Bromwich Albion | 14 June 2014 | 29 December 2014 | 22 | 5 | 6 | 11 | 22.7 | |
| Norwich City | 10 March 2017 | 25 May 2017 | 10 | 5 | 2 | 3 | 50.0 | |
| Total | | | 201 | 79 | 46 | 76 | 39.3 | — |

== Honours ==
Everton

- Football League Cup runner-up: 1983–84

Individual

- Football League Championship Manager of the Month: April 2009
- Football League One Manager of the Month: August 2010
