= Gary McGinnis =

Scottish footballer

Personal information
- Full name: Gary McGinnis
- Date of birth: 21 October 1963 (age 63)
- Place of birth: Dundee, Scotland
- Position: Defender

Youth career
- 1975–1981: Celtic Boys Club

Senior career*
Years	Team	Apps	(Gls)
1981–1983	Celtic	0	(0)
1983–1990	Dundee United	65	(7)
1990–1995	St Johnstone	137	(1)
1995–1996	Happy Valley	28	(6)
1996–1998	Slough Town	56	(0)

International career
1984	Scotland U21	1	(0)
Medal record
Scotland
UEFA European U-18 Championship
Winner	1982 Finland	Team competition
- * Club domestic league appearances and goals

Gary McGinnis (born 21 October 1963) is a Scottish former footballer.

== Career ==
A versatile defensive midfielder, McGinnis made the breakthrough into the Dundee United first team during the 1983–84 season, making six appearances and scored his only goal in his full debut for the club in a 3–0 League Cup win against Motherwell at Fir Park. He found it hard to get a regular spot in a defence featuring Malpas, Gough, Hegarty and Narey, being used as cover for all four over the next couple of seasons. McGinnis appeared in some of United's major European games, playing against Manchester United in the second leg at Tannadice in the 1984–85 UEFA Cup, and spent most of the 1986–87 UEFA Cup run on the bench, making six appearances in the run to the Final against IFK Gothenburg.

McGinnis played in a handful of games in each of the next three seasons and, after nine years at Tannadice, left for Tayside rivals St Johnstone in 1990. He became club captain during his five years at McDiarmid Park. He later played in Hong Kong with Happy Valley, before finishing his career in English non-League football with Slough Town.

As a youth, McGinnis won the Under-18 European Championship with Scotland in 1982 and reached the quarter-finals of the resulting 1983 Under-20 World Championships. He became a Scotland under-21 international, making his debut against Spain in November 1984.

McGinnis played his final years as a professional in the Queensland State League with Bundaberg Waves, before becoming the Director of Coaching for Central Queensland. He joined the Australian National League side Northern Spirit in 2002 as Head of Youth before taking on the role of Director of Coaching for Kuringai in 2007. Played for Harbord Seasiders Utd in the Manly Warringah Football League in Sydney. McGinnis helped the senior men's team to the Grand Final of their competition in 2009, missing out on a winner's medal after a 1–0 loss. As of 18 February 2012, McGinnis resides in Coffs Harbour, New South Wales. In 2013, he was appointed director of football for the North Coast Football association.

== Honours ==
=== Country ===
- Under-18 European Championship: 1

1982
