= Dave Bowman (footballer, born 1964) =

Scottish footballer (born 1964)

Personal information
- Full name: David Bowman
- Date of birth: 10 March 1964 (age 62)
- Place of birth: Tunbridge Wells, England
- Height: 5 ft 8 in (1.73 m)
- Positions: Midfielder; right-back

Team information
- Current team: Dundee United (Development squad assistant manager)

Senior career*
Years	Team	Apps	(Gls)
1980–1984	Heart of Midlothian	116	(8)
1984–1986	Coventry City	40	(2)
1986–1998	Dundee United	336	(9)
1998–1999	Raith Rovers	23	(0)
1999–2000	Orient & Yee Hope Union		(1)
2000–2002	Forfar Athletic	36	(2)
Total		551	(21)

International career
1992–1993	Scotland	6	(0)

Managerial career
- 2007: Livingston (caretaker)
- 2015: Dundee United (caretaker)
Medal record
Scotland
UEFA European U-18 Championship
Winner	1982 Finland	Team competition
- * Club domestic league appearances and goals

David Bowman (born 10 March 1964) is a Scottish football coach and former player. In a 12-year career with Dundee United he played in the 1987 UEFA Cup Final and won the 1993–94 Scottish Cup. At United he was also a three time Scottish Cup runner up.

He also played for Heart of Midlothian, Coventry City, Raith Rovers and Forfar Athletic as well as having a spell in Hong Kong with Yee Hope FC. He played six times for the Scotland national team and was a non-playing squad member at UEFA Euro 1992. Since 2007 he has worked as a community coach at Dundee United.

== Early life ==
Dave Bowman was born in Royal Tunbridge Wells, Kent, England on 10 March 1964. He is the son of Scottish footballer Andy Bowman, formerly of Chelsea and Heart of Midlothian (Hearts), who was playing for Tonbridge at the time of his son's birth. The family subsequently moved to Edinburgh, where Dave grew up. He played youth football for Salvesen Boys Club before signing for his father's former club, Hearts, in June 1980.

== Club career ==
Bowman started his senior career with Hearts, making 116 league appearances before leaving in 1984. He moved to Coventry City for two seasons where he was joined by Jim McInally, signing from Nottingham Forest. They left together in 1986, joining Dundee United for a combined £140,000 transfer fee, and reached the 1987 UEFA Cup Final in their first season there. En route United beat Barcelona home and away in the quarter-finals and then eliminated Borussia Mönchengladbach in the semi-finals. They lost 2–1 on aggregate in the final against IFK Göteborg.

Bowman and McInally won the Scottish Cup with Dundee United in 1994, beating Rangers in the final, and lost three other Scottish Cup finals, against St. Mirren in 1987, Celtic in 1988, and Motherwell in 1991, with Bowman scoring in the latter final. Bowman is ranked tenth on United's all-time appearance list.

He was linked with a move to Livingston in June 1998, but opted to sign for Raith Rovers. He also had spells with Hong Kong club Yee Hope, and finally Forfar Athletic. In October 2000, while playing for Forfar, he received a Scottish record seven-game suspension, imposed for swearing at the match officials. Bowman broke the record again in September 2001, being handed a seventeen-game suspension for committing the same offence in a match against Stranraer where the referee showed him the red card four times during his tirade, and then a fifth time for kicking in the referee's changeroom door ; as of 2022, this remains the longest suspension ever imposed by the Scottish FA.

== International career ==
Bowman made six full international appearances for Scotland between March 1992 and September 1993. He was part of Scotland's UEFA Euro 1992 finals squad, but was not selected for any of his team's three games.

== Coaching career ==
As Forfar were a part-time club, Bowman was able to join the coaching staff at Dundee United, where he continued to serve the club until he left following Craig Brewster's appointment as manager in 2006. After a brief spell as a pundit for BBC Radio Scotland's Sportsound programme, he returned to coaching when old friend John Robertson invited him to be his assistant at Livingston. Following his spell in Livingston, Bowman moved to Dens Park to work alongside Gordon Wallace as youth coach. In October 2007, Bowman returned to Tannadice for a third time, accepting an invitation as community coach.

On 28 September 2015, Bowman took temporary charge of Dundee United's first-team squad in the wake of manager Jackie McNamara's departure from the club.

== Career statistics ==
Appearances and goals by club, season and competition
Club	Season	League			National cup (Note: Includes Scottish Cup, FA Cup, FA Cup, Shield)		League cup (Note: Includes Scottish League Cup, Football League Cup, Hong Kong League Cup)		Continental		Total	
Club	Season	Division	Apps	Goals	Apps	Goals	Apps	Goals	Apps	Goals	Apps	Goals
Heart of Midlothian	1980–81	Scottish Premier Division	18	1	–		4	1	–		22	2
Heart of Midlothian	1981–82	Scottish Premier Division	16	1	2	0	5	0	–		23	1
Heart of Midlothian	1982–83	Scottish Premier Division	39	5	4	0	9	2	–		52	7
Heart of Midlothian	1983–84	Scottish Premier Division	33	0	1	0	7	0	–		41	0
Heart of Midlothian	1984–85	Scottish Premier Division	11	1	–		4	0	2	0	17	1
Heart of Midlothian	Total		117	8	7	0	29	3	2	0	155	11
Coventry City	1984–85	First Division	40	2							40	2
Coventry City	1985–86	First Division	40	2							40	2
Coventry City	Total		40	2					0	0	40	2
Dundee United	1986–87	Scottish Premier Division	28	0	2	0	1	0	6	0	37	0
Dundee United	1987–88	Scottish Premier Division	39	1	8	0	2	0	3	0	52	1
Dundee United	1988–89	Scottish Premier Division	28	1	3	1	4	0	4	0	39	2
Dundee United	1989–90	Scottish Premier Division	24	1	5	0	1	0	4	1	34	2
Dundee United	1990–91	Scottish Premier Division	20	1	4	1	1	0	2	0	27	2
Dundee United	1991–92	Scottish Premier Division	40	3	2	0	3	0	–		45	3
Dundee United	1992–93	Scottish Premier Division	24	0	1	0	–		–		25	0
Dundee United	1993–94	Scottish Premier Division	35	2	6	0	4	0	2	0	47	2
Dundee United	1994–95	Scottish Premier Division	31	0	4	1	2	0	1	0	38	1
Dundee United	1995–96	Scottish First Division	17	0	1	0	1	0	–		19	0
Dundee United	1996–97	Scottish Premier Division	28	0	1	0	2	0	–		31	0
Dundee United	1997–98	Scottish Premier Division	19	0	1	0	4	0	4	0	28	0
Dundee United	Total		333	9	38	3	25	0	26	1	422	13
Raith Rovers	1998–99	Scottish First Division	23	0	1	0	2	0	–		26	0
Orient and Yee Hope Union	1999–2000	Hong Kong First Division League	–		–		–		–		–	
Forfar Athletic	2000–01	Scottish Second Division	23	2	1	0	1	0	–		25	2
Forfar Athletic	2001–02	Scottish Second Division	12	0	–		1	0	–		13	0
Forfar Athletic	Total		35	2	1	0	2	0	0	0	38	2
Career total			551	21	47	3	58	3	28	1	684	28

== Honours ==
Dundee United

- Scottish Cup: 1993–94
  - Runner-up 1986–87, 1987–88, 1990–91
- UEFA Cup: Runner-up 1986–87
- Scottish League Cup: Runner-up 1997–98

Scotland U-18

- UEFA Under-18 Championship: 1982

== See also ==
- List of footballers in Scotland by number of league appearances (500+)
- List of Scotland international footballers born outside Scotland
