= Hamish French =

Scottish footballer and coach

Personal information
- Full name: Hamish Mackie French
- Date of birth: 7 February 1964 (age 62)
- Place of birth: Aberdeen, Scotland
- Positions: Midfielder; forward

Youth career
- Formartine U18s

Senior career*
Years	Team	Apps	(Gls)
	Formartine United	?	(?)
19??–1983	Keith	?	(?)
1983	Dundee United	0	(0)
1983–87	Keith	?	(?)
1987–91	Dundee United	76	(11)
1991–2000	Dunfermline Athletic	231	(55)
2000–01	Alloa Athletic	23	(2)
2001–03	Cowdenbeath	42	(5)
- * Club domestic league appearances and goals

Hamish Mackie French (born 7 February 1964) is a Scottish former football player and coach. He played for Dundee United, Dunfermline Athletic, Alloa Athletic and Cowdenbeath.

== Career ==
=== Playing ===
Hamish French was born in Methlick, Aberdeenshire. A product of the Scottish Highland Football League, French commenced his professional football career as a midfielder or forward with Keith FC of the Highland League. After several seasons with Keith FC, French signed for Dundee United in 1987, but his career there was disrupted by injuries. He later went on to play for Dunfermline Athletic between 1991 and 2000 before finishing his career with spells at Alloa Athletic and Cowdenbeath.
