= John Clark (footballer, born 1964) =

Scottish footballer

Personal information
- Full name: John Brown Clark
- Date of birth: 22 September 1964 (age 62)
- Place of birth: Edinburgh, Scotland
- Position: Defender

Youth career
- 1976–1982: Dundee United

Senior career*
Years	Team	Apps	(Gls)
1982–1994	Dundee United	242	(19)
1994	Stoke City	17	(0)
1994–1996	Falkirk	48	(10)
1996–1997	Dunfermline Athletic	19	(2)
1996	Ross County	1	(1)
1996	Ayr United	1	(0)
1997–1999	Berwick Rangers	26	(2)
Total		354	(34)

Managerial career
- 2001–2004: Gala Fairydean
- 2004–2005: Whitehill Welfare
- * Club domestic league appearances and goals

John Brown Clark (born 22 September 1964) is a Scottish former footballer. He is best known for his achievements in a lengthy playing career with Dundee United. He top scored for them in the run to the 1987 UEFA Cup Final in which he scored in the defeat in the final. Among his four goals in that run was one against FC Barcelona at Camp Nou in the quarter-final.

He also played for Stoke City, Falkirk, Dunfermline Athletic, Ross County, Ayr United and Berwick Rangers.

== Career ==
=== Dundee United ===
Clark was born in Edinburgh and joined Dundee United in 1976 and began to play for the reserves as a forward where he scored over 100 goals. He made his debut in the 1982–83 season.

His best season was 1986–87 where he featured prominently at centre half. He was their top scorer on the way to the 1987 UEFA Cup Final with a goal against each of Universitatea Craiova, Hajduk Split and FC Barcelona at the Camp Nou. He also scored in the second leg of the final at Tannadice Park as United lost 2–1 to IFK Göteborg.

That same season United also lost the 1987 Scottish Cup Final to St Mirren as they also did the season after to Celtic. Clark remained a regular in the Tannadice defence for the late 1980s and early 1990s making 330 appearances scoring 37 goals.

=== Stoke City ===
He moved to English club Stoke City in January 1994. Clark started his Stoke against Barnsley in a 3–0 defeat. He ended the 1993–94 season with 12 appearances. In 1994–95 Clark played in six matches and scored his only goal for Stoke which came in a 2–0 victory over Cesena in the Anglo-Italian Cup. When Lou Macari replaced Joe Jordan as manager in September 1994 Clark returned to Scotland.

=== Later career ===
Clark next joined Falkirk before transferring part way through his second season to Dunfermline. He had short spells also playing for Ayr United, Ross County and Berwick Rangers. He became Assistant Manager at Berwick.

Clark then dropped out of senior football with Gala Fairydean where he became player-manager. He became manager of Whitehill Welfare in 2004.

== Career statistics ==
- Sourced from John Clark at the English National Football Archive (subscription required)

Appearances and goals by club, season and competition
Club	Season	League			FA Cup		League Cup		Other^{[A]}		Total	
Club	Season	Division	Apps	Goals	Apps	Goals	Apps	Goals	Apps	Goals	Apps	Goals
Dundee United	1982–83	Scottish Premier Division	1	0	1	0	1	0	0	0	3	0
Dundee United	1983–84	Scottish Premier Division	10	1	3	0	5	0	3	0	21	1
Dundee United	1984–85	Scottish Premier Division	10	3	1	0	3	3	1	0	15	6
Dundee United	1985–86	Scottish Premier Division	11	1	0	0	0	0	2	0	13	1
Dundee United	1986–87	Scottish Premier Division	30	3	6	0	1	0	10	4	47	7
Dundee United	1987–88	Scottish Premier Division	28	3	8	0	0	0	3	2	39	5
Dundee United	1988–89	Scottish Premier Division	20	2	4	0	3	0	3	0	30	2
Dundee United	1989–90	Scottish Premier Division	29	1	4	1	2	0	3	2	38	4
Dundee United	1990–91	Scottish Premier Division	18	2	6	2	0	0	1	0	25	4
Dundee United	1991–92	Scottish Premier Division	34	1	2	3	1	0	0	0	39	2
Dundee United	1992–93	Scottish Premier Division	37	2	1	3	0	0	0	0	41	2
Dundee United	1993–94	Scottish Premier Division	14	0	0	0	3	2	2	1	19	3
Dundee United	Total		242	19	36	3	23	6	29	9	330	37
Stoke City	1993–94	First Division	12	0	0	0	0	0	0	0	12	0
Stoke City	1994–95	First Division	5	0	0	0	0	0	1	1	6	1
Stoke City	Total		17	0	0	0	0	0	1	1	18	1
Career total			259	19	36	3	23	6	30	10	348	38

A. The "Other" column constitutes appearances and goals in the Anglo-Italian Cup and UEFA Cup.

== Honours ==
Dundee United

- Scottish Cup runner-up: 1986–87, 1987–88, 1990–91
- UEFA Cup runner-up: 1986–87
