= Dundee derby =

Association football rivalry

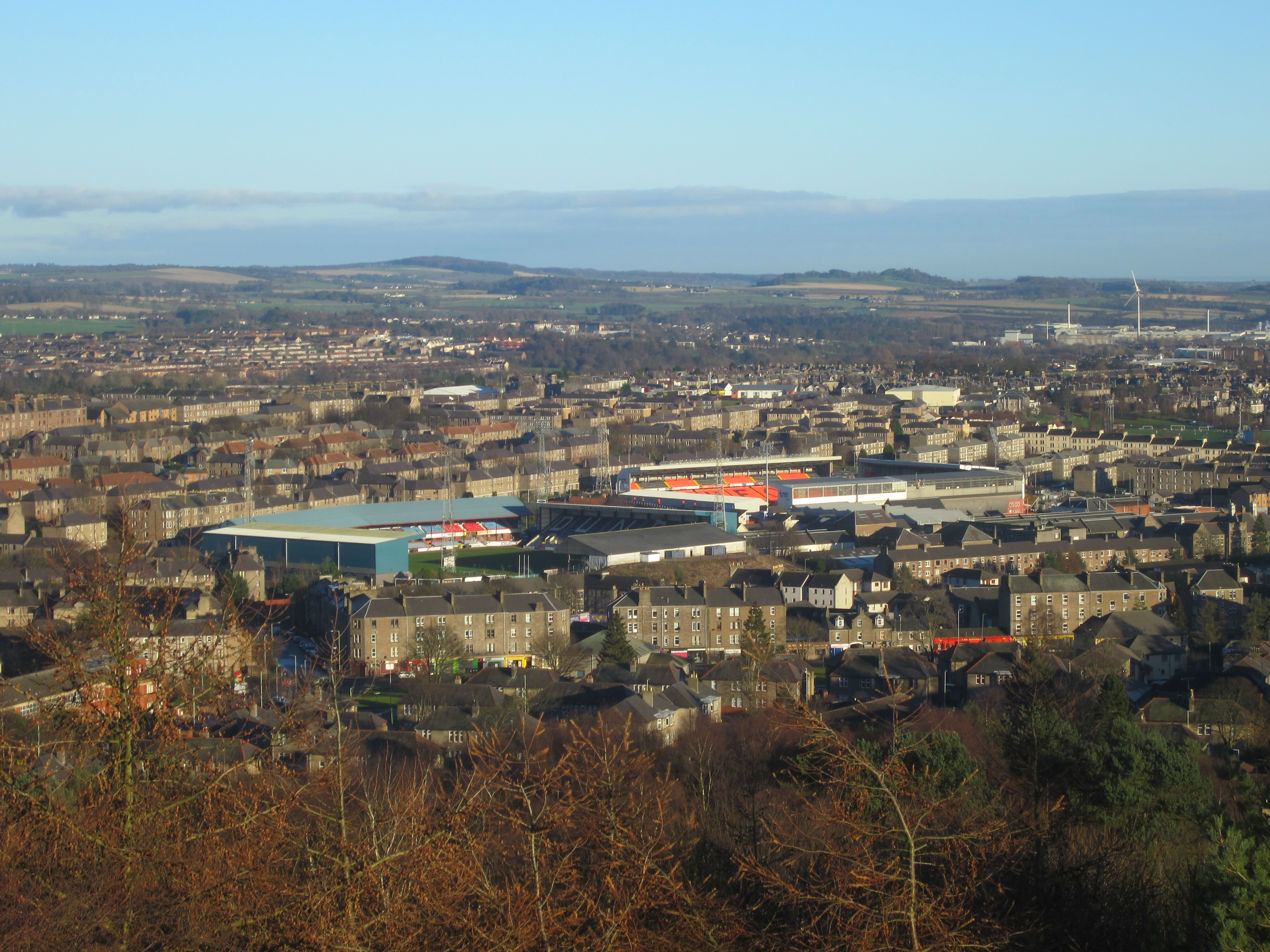
- Dens Park and Tannadice Park viewed from Dundee Law in 2014
- Location: Dundee, Scotland
- Teams: Dundee; Dundee United
- First meeting: 21 November 1925; Scottish Division One; Dundee 0–0 Dundee United
- Latest meeting: 22 August 2026; Scottish Premiership; Dundee United 0–2 Dundee
- Next meeting: 2 January 2027; Scottish Premiership; Dundee v Dundee United
- Stadiums: Dens Park (Dundee FC); Tannadice Park (Dundee United)

Statistics
- Total meetings: 183
- Most wins: Dundee United (84)
- All-time series: Dundee: 53; Drawn: 46; Dundee United: 84
- Largest victory: Dundee 5–0 Dundee United; Scottish Division One (28 August 1926); Dundee 0–5 Dundee United; Scottish Division One (11 September 1965)

The Dundee derby is the title given to any football match contested between Dundee and Dundee United, the two professional football clubs in the city of Dundee, Scotland. The first competitive fixture between the sides was held at Dens Park in the 1917–18 season.

Due to Dundee's smaller population and size, especially in comparison to the Edinburgh derby and Glasgow's Old Firm, it is considered a friendlier rivalry; families are split in terms of the club they support, and both groups of fans are known to socialise on match days. It is also a notable derby geographically, as both clubs are located just 183 metres apart, making them the closest city rivals in Britain and one of the closest city rivals in world football.

== History ==
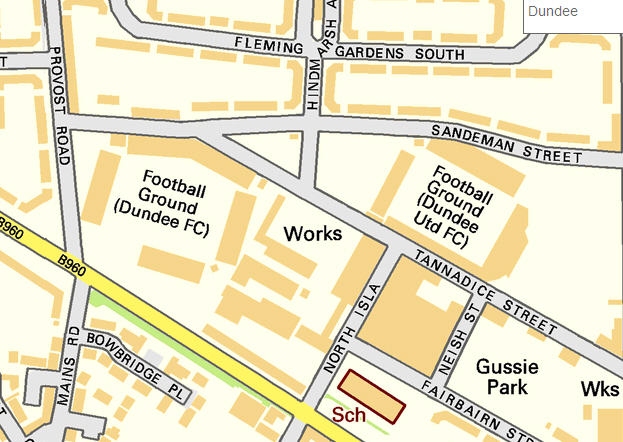
Map showing the proximity of Tannadice Park home Dundee United (right) to Dundee FC's stadium Dens Park (left)

Dundee is the older of the two, having been founded in 1893, compared to Dundee United which was founded in 1909 as Dundee Hibernian following the demise of Dundee Harp, a club founded by Irish immigrants in 1879. While United's origins stem from Irish immigration, the rivalry is not sectarian in the manner of the Old Firm.

Dundee had long been the more successful club, playing more seasons in the top flight than their rivals and winning one League title, one Scottish Cup and three League Cups before United lifted a major trophy. However, from the 1970s under Jim McLean the tide turned in the city's footballing rivalry. United would go on to be a major force in Scottish football in the 1980s, winning their first three major honours at Dens Park including a League Cup win against Dundee in 1980; the 1983 league title was also won there. Their rivalry with Aberdeen, who also lifted several trophies during the period, was entitled the New Firm. In 1994 United won their first Scottish Cup, and their second in 2010, in doing so drawing level with Dundee on five major trophies won.

The two grounds are the closest football grounds in Britain (holding the world record until 2009) and with it a unique rivalry has developed, though it is one often deemed more amicable than most; similar to the Merseyside derby, Derby della Madonnina in Milan, and the Derby della Lanterna of Genoa with many families split down the middle in support.

The two clubs even had a combined hooligan 'firm', known as the Dundee Utility, which was formed to stand up to the larger firms of the Glasgow and Edinburgh clubs.

== Statistics ==
=== Head-to-head ===
In head-to-head, United are quite far in front; the teams have played each other 182 times, Dundee United winning 84 compared to Dundee's 52. A total of 46 matches have ended in a stalemate. Dundee United have won more league, Scottish Cup and League Cup matches.

As of 22 August 2026

Team	League	Scottish Cup	League Cup	Total	Goals
Dundee wins	44	4	5	53	235
Dundee United wins	69	8	7	84	302
Draws	35	7	4	46	—N/a

=== League placing comparison ===
==== 1975–2000 ====
P.	76	77	78	79	80	81	82	83	84	85	86	87	88	89	90	91	92	93	94	95	96	97	98	99	00
1								1																	
2																									
3			3	3					3	3	3	3										3			
4		4			4		4							4	4	4	4	4							
5						5							5											5	
6								6		6	6	6							6						
7													7										7		7
8	8						8		8					8											8
9	9				9																			9	
10															10			10		10					
11																									
12																			12						
D2		3	3	1		2										3	1				2	3	1		
D2																					5				

==== 2000–2026 ====
P.	01	02	03	04	05	06	07	08	09	10	11	12	13	14	15	16	17	18	19	20	21	22	23	24	25	26
1																										
2																										
3										3																
4											4	4		4								4			4	
5				5				5	5						5											
6	6		6										6		6									6		
7				7																						7
8		8														8										8
9		9			9	9	9											9			9					
10																	10								10	
11	11		11																							
12					12								12			12			12			12	12			
D2						7	3	2	4	2	6	2		1			3	3	2	1	2		1	1		
D2																				3						

== Full game list ==
Dundee won
Dundee United won
Drawn

Fixtures from 1925 to the present day featuring League games, Scottish Cup and League Cup matches. Friendlies, testimonials and other non-competitive games are not included. Dundee wins are coloured in blue, United wins in tangerine and draws are grey. Note that United played in white until 1969 but tangerine is used throughout for ease.

Date	Competition	Venue	Result	Crowd	Scorers (Dundee)	Scorers (United)
21 Nov 1925	Division One	Dens	0–0	18,000	—	—
4 Jan 1926	Division One	Tannadice	0–1	20,059	McLean	—
28 Aug 1926	Division One	Dens	5–0	20,000	Andy Campbell (4), Jim Meagher	—
3 Jan 1927	Division One	Tannadice	1–0	20,000	—	Jock Kay
4 Feb 1928	Scottish Cup round 2	Tannadice	3–3	20,365	Lawley, Whitlow (2)	Jacky Kay, Hutchison (2)
8 Feb 1928	Scottish Cup round 2	Dens	1–0	12,839	Willie O'Hare	—
16 Feb 1929	Scottish Cup round 3	Dens	1–1	24,000	Lawley	Hutchison
20 Feb 1929	Scottish Cup round 3	Tannadice	1–0	14,000	—	Henderson
31 Aug 1929	Division One	Dens	1–0	14,200	Frank Townrow	—
11 Jan 1930	Division One	Tannadice	0–1	16,000	Andy Campbell	—
12 Sep 1931	Division One	Dens	1–1	17,000	Andy Campbell	Brant
2 Jan 1932	Division One	Tannadice	0–3	16,000	Andy Campbell (2), Davie Balfour	—
17 Sep 1938	Division Two	Tannadice	3–0	10,523	—	Woolley (2), Meikleham
18 Mar 1939	Division Two	Dens	2–0	12,500	McGillivray, Bobby Wilson	—
24 Aug 1946	Division Two	Tannadice	1–2	21,000	Juliussen, Turnbull	Mackay
1 Jan 1947	Division Two	Dens	2–0	24,000	Turnbull, Ernie Ewen	—
27 Jan 1951	Scottish Cup round 1	Dens	2–2	38,000	Boyd, Ernie Ewen	McKay, Dunsmore
31 Jan 1951	Scottish Cup round 1	Tannadice	0–1	22,000	Steel	—
4 Feb 1956	Scottish Cup round 5	Tannadice	2–2	20,000	Ian Stables, Merchant	Milne (2)
8 Feb 1956	Scottish Cup round 5	Dens	3–0	17,000	Merchant, Ian Stables, Henderson	—
12 Sep 1956	League Cup QF-1	Dens	7–3	20,000	Black, George Christie, Jimmy Chalmers (3), George O'Hara, Merchant	Sturrock, Reid (2)
15 Sep 1956	League Cup QF-2	Tannadice	2–1	14,000	Merchant	Reid, Milne
17 Sep 1960	Division One	Tannadice	3–1	20,000	Penman	Briggs, Campbell (2)
7 Jan 1961	Division One	Dens	3–0	22,000	Wishart (2), Adamson	—
9 Sep 1961	Division One	Dens	4–1	18,765	Penman, Smith, Briggs (o.g.), Robertson	Gillespie
9 Apr 1962	Division One	Tannadice	1–2	21,138	Gilzean (2)	Irvine
11 Aug 1962	League Cup Group 2	Tannadice	3–2	22,917	Gilzean (2)	Carlyle (2), Irvine
25 Aug 1962	League Cup Group 2	Dens	2–1	18,493	Smith (2)	Irvine
15 Sep 1962	Division One	Tannadice	1–1	15,627	Cousin	Carlyle
17 Apr 1963	Division One	Dens	1–2	14,967	Waddell	Mochan, Mitchell
14 Sep 1963	Division One	Dens	1–1	20,945	Gilzean	Mitchell
2 Jan 1964	Division One	Tannadice	2–1	21,255	Gilzean	Mitchell (2)
8 Aug 1964	League Cup Group 4	Dens	2–3	16,773	Penman, Waddell	Gillespie, Thom, Munro
22 Aug 1964	League Cup Group 4	Tannadice	2–1	14,519	Stuart	Graham, Munro
12 Sep 1964	Division One	Tannadice	1–4	16,838	Cousin, Waddell, Scott (2)	Thom
24 Mar 1965	Division One	Dens	2–4	16,958	Cooke, Cameron	Persson (2), Gillespie, Døssing
18 Aug 1965	League Cup Group 1	Dens	0–0	23,095	—	—
1 Sep 1965	League Cup Group 1	Tannadice	1–3	18,705	Cameron (2), Murray	Mitchell
11 Sep 1965	Division One	Dens	0–5	15,058	—	Døssing (3), Gillespie, Wing
3 Jan 1966	Division One	Tannadice	2–1	21,325	Murray	Mitchell, Seemann
13 Aug 1966	League Cup Group 1	Tannadice	2–0	13,867	—	Persson, Hainey
27 Aug 1966	League Cup Group 1	Dens	1–1	10,087	Penman	Hainey
17 Sep 1966	Division One	Tannadice	1–4	10,198	Cameron, Penman (2), McKay	Mitchell
3 Jan 1967	Division One	Dens	2–3	17,286	Scott, Bryce	Graham (3)
16 Sep 1967	Division One	Dens	2–2	13,186	McLean, Scott	Briggs, Millar
2 Jan 1968	Division One	Tannadice	0–0	14,014	—	—
14 Sep 1968	Division One	Tannadice	3–1	13,942	Georgeson	Mitchell, Wood, Cameron
2 Jan 1969	Division One	Dens	1–2	19,549	Bryce	Mitchell, Hogg
20 Sep 1969	Division One	Dens	1–2	11,888	Wallace	Gordon, Gillespie
3 Jan 1970	Division One	Tannadice	4–1	16,891	Wallace	Cameron (2), og, Wilson
12 Sep 1970	Division One	Tannadice	3–2	12,319	Gilroy, Scott	Cameron, Gillespie, Gordon
5 Apr 1971	Division One	Dens	2–3	11,590	Scott, Steele	Cameron, Gordon, Reid
11 Sep 1971	Division One	Dens	6–4	13,818	Bryce (2), Scott (2), Wallace (2)	Gordon, Rolland (2), Smith
3 Jan 1972	Division One	Tannadice	1–1	16,954	Steele	Cameron
16 Sep 1972	Division One	Tannadice	2–1	12,071	Ford	Gardner, White
6 Jan 1973	Division One	Dens	3–0	13,570	Duncan (2), Houston	—
15 Sep 1973	Division One	Dens	0–1	12,092	—	Smith
5 Jan 1974	Division One	Tannadice	1–2	12,087	Duncan (2)	Gardner
14 Sep 1974	Division One	Tannadice	3–0	10,857	—	Gray (2), Munro
4 Jan 1975	Division One	Dens	2–0	16,184	Wallace, Anderson	—
18 Oct 1975	Premier Division	Tannadice	1–2	11,327	Wallace, Wilson Hoggan	Houston
20 Dec 1975	Premier Division	Dens	0–0	9,957	—	—
28 Feb 1976	Premier Division	Tannadice	1–0	10,199	—	McAdam
21 Apr 1976	Premier Division	Dens	2–1	13,768	Gemmell, Sinclair	Hall
11 Aug 1979	Premier Division	Tannadice	3–0	17,968	—	Sturrock, Kirkwood, Stark
20 Oct 1979	Premier Division	Dens	1–0	16,305	Sinclair	—
22 Dec 1979	Premier Division	Tannadice	2–0	15,431	—	Holt, Pettigrew
30 Jan 1980	Scottish Cup round 3	Tannadice	5–1	18,604	Pirie	Pettigrew (4), Sturrock
1 Mar 1980	Premier Division	Dens	1–1	15,110	Shirra	Sturrock
6 Dec 1980	League Cup Final	Dens	0–3	24,466	—	Dodds, Sturrock (2)
12 Sep 1981	Premier Division	Tannadice	5–2	15,696	I. Ferguson, Mackie	Kirkwood, Sturrock (2), Milne, Bannon
14 Nov 1981	Premier Division	Dens	1–3	15,578	I. Ferguson	Milne, Sturrock (2)
10 Mar 1982	Premier Division	Tannadice	1–1	13,790	I. Ferguson	McKimmie (o.g.)
3 Apr 1982	Premier Division	Dens	0–2	12,602	—	Bannon, Sturrock
30 Oct 1982	Premier Division	Tannadice	1–0	14,959	—	Dodds
1 Jan 1983	Premier Division	Dens	0–2	18,109	—	Milne (2)
12 Mar 1983	Premier Division	Tannadice	5–3	13,448	Fraser, I. Ferguson, Kidd	Gough (2), Reilly, Hegarty, Dodds
14 May 1983	Premier Division	Dens	1–2	29,106	I. Ferguson	Milne, Bannon
3 Sep 1983	Premier Division	Dens	1–4	13,651	McCall	Reilly (2), Milne, Stark
5 Nov 1983	Premier Division	Tannadice	0–1	14,813	Mackie	—
2 Apr 1984	Premier Division	Dens	2–5	12,732	I. Ferguson (2)	Malpas, Reilly, Dodds, Bannon, Milne
21 Apr 1984	Premier Division	Tannadice	1–1	13,244	McCall	Clark
8 Sep 1984	Premier Division	Tannadice	3–4	14,190	McWilliams, McKinlay, Harris, Brown	Clark (2), Sturrock
10 Nov 1984	Premier Division	Dens	0–2	14,423	—	Gough, Coyne
3 Apr 1985	Premier Division	Tannadice	4–0	15,167	—	Bannon, Sturrock, Taylor, Dodds
11 May 1985	Premier Division	Dens	1–0	13,426	Connor	—
24 Aug 1985	Premier Division	Tannadice	2–0	13,736	—	Beedie, Sturrock
16 Nov 1985	Premier Division	Dens	0–3	11,736	—	Hegarty (2), Kirkwood
28 Dec 1985	Premier Division	Tannadice	0–0	14,869	—	—
29 Mar 1986	Premier Division	Dens	0–1	15,079	—	Gough
6 Sep 1986	Premier Division	Dens	0–2	12,379	—	Milne, Bannon
8 Nov 1986	Premier Division	Tannadice	0–3	11,728	Harvey (2), Shannon	—
10 Mar 1987	Premier Division	Dens	1–1	11,615	Brown	Gallacher
28 Mar 1987	Premier Division	Tannadice	1–1	12,220	Rafferty	Glennie (o.g.)
11 Apr 1987	Scottish Cup semi-final	Tynecastle	3–2	13,319	Coyne, Wright	I. Ferguson (2), Hegarty
2 Sep 1987	League Cup quarter-final	Dens	2–1 a.e.t.	19,867	Coyne, Wright	I. Ferguson
3 Oct 1987	Premier Division	Dens	1–1	11,497	Coyne	I. Ferguson
28 Nov 1987	Premier Division	Tannadice	1–3	13,626	Coyne (2), Wright	Clark
16 Jan 1988	Premier Division	Dens	0–2	13,644	—	Paatelainen, Bannon
12 Mar 1988	Scottish Cup quarter-final	Dens	0–0	19,355	—	—
15 Mar 1988	Scottish Cup quarter-final	Tannadice	2–2 a.e.t.	19,102	Harvey (2)	Bannon (2)
28 Mar 1988	Scottish Cup quarter-final replay	Dens	0–3	19,152	—	McLeod, Redford, I. Ferguson
2 Apr 1988	Premier Division	Tannadice	1–0	13,876	—	French
3 Sep 1988	Premier Division	Dens	0–3	14,927	—	Paatelainen (2), Gallacher
5 Nov 1988	Premier Division	Tannadice	2–0	14,882	—	Meade, Paatelainen
7 Jan 1989	Premier Division	Dens	0–1	16,332	—	French
28 Jan 1989	Scottish Cup round 3	Dens	1–2	18,117	Angus	Bowman, Meade
8 Apr 1989	Premier Division	Tannadice	2–1	11,912	Saunders	Sturrock, Gallacher
19 Aug 1989	Premier Division	Dens	4–3	13,623	Wright(3), McBride	Malpas, O'Neill, Paatelainen
28 Oct 1989	Premier Division	Tannadice	0–0	11,528	—	—
30 Dec 1989	Premier Division	Dens	1–1	12,805	Chisholm	Jackson
20 Jan 1990	Scottish Cup round 3	Dens	0–0	14,276	—	—
23 Jan 1990	Scottish Cup round 3	Tannadice	1–0	15,503	—	Clark
24 Mar 1990	Premier Division	Tannadice	1–2	11,918	Wright, Shannon	Connolly
13 Mar 1991	Scottish Cup quarter-final	Tannadice	3–1	16,228	Dodds	McKinnon, Jackson, D. Ferguson
19 Sep 1992	Premier Division	Tannadice	0–1	12,622	Dodds	—
21 Nov 1992	Premier Division	Dens	1–3	11,116	Dodds	Bollan, Connolly, Clark
27 Feb 1993	Premier Division	Tannadice	1–0	12,140	—	D. Ferguson
20 Apr 1993	Premier Division	Dens	0–4	9,589	—	Connolly, Dailly (2), Bollan
11 Sep 1993	Premier Division	Tannadice	1–0	10,283	—	McLaren
7 Dec 1993	Premier Division	Dens	1–2	9,256	Farningham	Brewster, Connolly
5 Feb 1994	Premier Division	Tannadice	1–1	10,622	Ristić	Connolly
29 Mar 1994	Premier Division	Dens	1–1	7,645	Duffy	Brewster
30 Sep 1995	First Division	Dens	2–3	10,395	Hamilton (2)	McKinlay (3)
18 Nov 1995	First Division	Tannadice	2–3	10,682	Shaw (2), Wieghorst	Brewster, Malpas
9 Jan 1996	First Division	Dens	0–2	9,199	—	Winters (2)
16 Mar 1996	First Division	Tannadice	2–0	9,669	—	Brewster, McSwegan
3 Sep 1996	League Cup round 3	Tannadice	2–2 (2–4 p)	11,839	Hamilton (2)	Coyle, McSwegan
19 Sep 1998	Premier League	Dens	2–2	12,081	Annand, Adamczuk	McSwegan, Olofsson
22 Nov 1998	Premier League	Tannadice	0–1	11,230	Grady	—
2 Jan 1999	Premier League	Dens	1–3	11,751	McSkimming	Dodds, Thompson, Olofsson
1 May 1999	Premier League	Tannadice	0–2	12,280	Irvine, Grady	—
31 Jul 1999	Premier League	Tannadice	2–1	11,693	Falconer	Skoldmark, Ferraz
17 Oct 1999	Premier League	Dens	0–2	9,484	—	Dodds, Thompson
12 Dec 1999	Premier League	Tannadice	1–0	9,185	—	Ferraz
6 May 2000	Premier League	Dens	3–0	8,581	Falconer (2), Grady	—
20 Sep 2000	Premier League	Dens	3–0	9,838	Sara (3)	—
11 Nov 2000	Premier League	Tannadice	0–2	11,454	Caniggia, Nemsadze	—
31 Jan 2001	Premier League	Dens	2–3	11,724	Caniggia, Falconer	Davidson, Easton, Lauchlan
28 Jul 2001	Premier League	Tannadice	2–2	13,327	Sara, Rae	Miller, Hamilton
3 Nov 2001	Premier League	Dens	1–1	11,751	Carranza	Miller
19 Jan 2002	Premier League	Tannadice	1–0	12,851	—	McIntyre
20 Apr 2002	Premier League	Dens	0–1	10,087	—	Wilkie (o.g.)
31 Aug 2002	Premier League	Tannadice	0–0	12,402	—	—
23 Nov 2002	Premier League	Dens	3–2	11,539	Caballero (2), Hernandez	Hamilton, McIntyre
9 Feb 2003	Premier League	Tannadice	1–1	10,457	Novo	Mackay (o.g.)
26 Oct 2003	Premier League	Tannadice	1–1	12,292	Novo	McIntyre
25 Jan 2004	Premier League	Dens	2–1	10,747	Novo, Lovell	Dodds
11 Apr 2004	Premier League	Tannadice	2–2	9,571	Lovell, Milne	Dodds (2)
15 Aug 2004	Premier League	Tannadice	1–2	11,118	Lovell, Sutton	Archibald
6 Nov 2004	Premier League	Dens	1–0	9,845	Sutton	—
29 Jan 2005	Premier League	Tannadice	2–2	12,703	McManus, Lovell	Duff, McIntyre
30 Apr 2005	Premier League	Dens	1–2	11,263	Lovell	Wilson, McIntyre
19 Aug 2012	Premier League	Tannadice	3–0	13,538	—	Gunning, Russell (2)
9 Dec 2012	Premier League	Dens	0–3	11,419	—	Watson, Daly, Flood
3 Mar 2013	Scottish Cup quarter-final	Dens	1–2	10,191	McAlister	McLean, Mackay-Steven
17 Mar 2013	Premier League	Tannadice	1–1	10,731	Conroy	Gardyne
21 Sep 2014	Premiership	Dens	1–4	11,447	Stewart	Bilate, Dow, Morris, Watson
24 Sep 2014	League Cup round 3	Tannadice	1–0	13,041	—	Fojut
1 Jan 2015	Premiership	Tannadice	6–2	12,964	Stewart, Tankulic	Armstrong, Mackay-Steven (2), Erskine, Fojut, Telfer
8 Apr 2015	Premiership	Dens	3–1	10,515	Stewart, McPake, Heffernan	Çiftçi
24 May 2015	Premiership	Tannadice	3–0	10,812	—	Çiftçi (2), Spittal
11 Aug 2015	Premiership	Tannadice	2–2	11,835	Stewart, McPake	Spittal (2)
2 Jan 2016	Premiership	Dens	2–1	11,025	Hemmings, Ross	Spittal
20 Mar 2016	Premiership	Tannadice	2–2	11,603	Hemmings (2)	McKay (2)
2 May 2016	Premiership	Dens	2–1	10,088	Gadzhalov, Wighton	Ofere
30 July 2017	League Cup Group C	Dens	1–1 (3–4 p)	10,460	O'Hara	McMullan
9 Aug 2017	League Cup round 2	Dens	2–1	10,472	El Bakhtaoui, McGowan	King
30 Aug 2019	Championship	Tannadice	6–2	14,108	Hemmings, Nelson	Butcher (2), Appéré, Shankland, Harkes, Smith
8 Nov 2019	Championship	Dens	0–2	11,233	—	Clark, Shankland
27 Dec 2019	Championship	Tannadice	1–1	14,007	Dorrans	Clark
19 Sept 2021	Premiership	Tannadice	1–0	12,806	—	Harkes
1 Feb 2022	Premiership	Dens	0–0	11,273	—	—
9 Apr 2022	Premiership	Tannadice	2–2	10,307	Mullen, Adam	Clark, Mulgrew
4 Aug 2024	Premiership	Tannadice	2–2	12,616	Palmer-Houlden, McCowan	Trapanovski, Thomson
2 Jan 2025	Premiership	Dens	1–2	11,585	Murray	Ševelj, Dalby
20 Jan 2025	Scottish Cup round 4	Dens	1–0	9,294	Murray	—
16 Mar 2025	Premiership	Tannadice	2–4	13,000	McGhee (2), Tiffoney, Murray	Middleton, Trapanovski
31 Aug 2025	Premiership	Dens	0–2	10,750	—	Sapsford, Dolček
3 Jan 2026	Premiership	Tannadice	0–1	13,495	Hay	—
15 Mar 2026	Premiership	Dens	2–2	11,010	Hay, Graham (o.g.)	Fatah, Stephenson
26 Apr 2026	Premiership	Tannadice	3–0	13,207	—	Ferry (2), Strain
22 Aug 2026	Premiership	Tannadice	0–2	13,337	Wright, O. Bevan	—
2 Jan 2027	Premiership	Dens				
13 Mar 2027	Premiership	Tannadice				

== Honours ==
Both clubs have won five major Scottish football trophies.

Club	League titles		Scottish Cups		Scottish League Cups		Total
Club	Total	Seasons	Total	Seasons	Total	Seasons	Total
Dundee	1	1961–62	1	1909–10	3	1951–52, 1952–53, 1973–74	5
Dundee United	1	1982–83	2	1993–94, 2009–10	2	1979–80, 1980–81	5

== Team records ==
The following are records just for the Dundee derby itself:

- The longest unbeaten run in all matches is 13, held by United, this was between December 1979 and September 1983, 11 of these were Wins.
- The longest unbeaten run in home matches is held by Dundee when United failed to beat them for 14 games between November 1925 and August 1962.
- The longest unbeaten run in away matches is held by United with a 12 match run at Dens Park between April 1963 and April 1971 which included 8 victories.
- The longest unbroken winning run in all matches belongs to United with 7 between March 1988 and April 1989.
- The longest unbroken winning run at home belongs to United with 6 between September 1974 and September 1981.
- The longest unbroken winning run away from home belongs to United who scored 8 consecutive victories at Dens Park between December 1980 and November 1984.
- The record home victory in a league match is 5–0 recorded by Dundee at Dens Park in August 1926
- The record away victory in a league match is 5–0 recorded by United at Dens Park in September 1965.
- The highest scoring match was in September 1971 when Dundee won 6–4 at Dens Park.
- Paul Sturrock of United holds the mark for the most derby goals with 14, 2 of these came in United's 3–0 League Cup Final win over Dundee at Dens Park in December 1980.
- Record Attendance:
  - 29,106 at Dens Park, 14 May 1983 (Premier Division)
  - 21,325 at Tannadice, 3 January 1966 (old Division One)
- Lowest Attendance:
  - 9,185 at Tannadice, 12 December 1999 (SPL)
  - 7,645 at Dens Park, 29 January 1994 (Premier Division)

== Players at both clubs ==
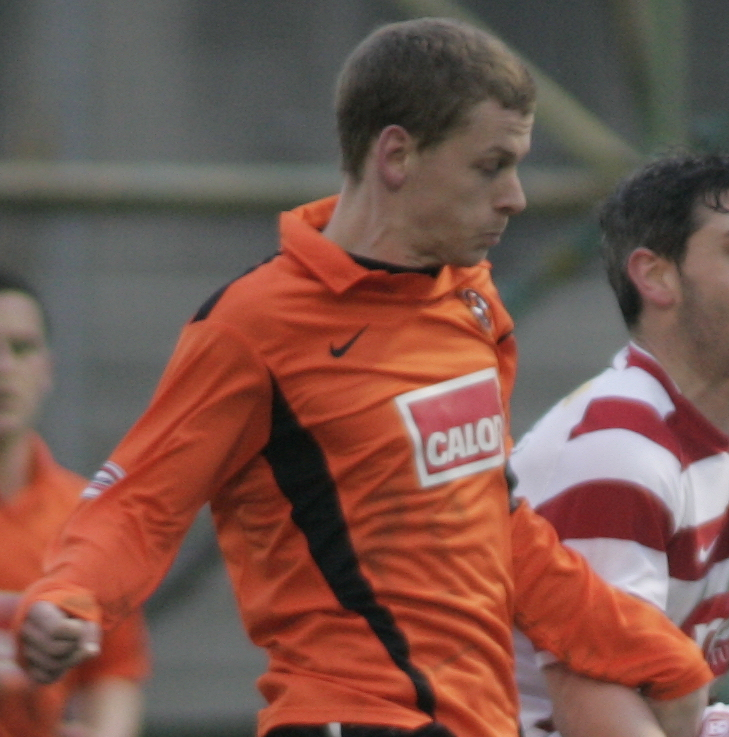
Dundee-born Scott Robertson began his career at Dens Park then switched to Tannadice, making over 100 appearances for both clubs

16 players have signed for Dundee United directly from Dundee, with 10 making the opposite journey from Tannadice to Dens Park. Only players who have played at least one first team game for both clubs are currently included.

=== Dundee to Dundee United ===
Date	Player	Fee
1909	(Scotland) Tim Dailly	Unknown
1909	(Scotland) Thomas Flood	Unknown
1913	(Scotland) Collie Martin	Unknown
1913	(Scotland) Fred Stoessel	Unknown
25 June 1929	(Scotland) Jock Ross	Unknown
1933	(Scotland) James Angus Munro	Unknown
1947	(Scotland) Jimmy Dickson	Unknown
1948	(Scotland) Kinnaird Ouchterlonie	Unknown
1952	(Scotland) Bobby Henderson	Unknown
1969	(Scotland) Alex Stuart	Unknown
1973	(Scotland) Duncan MacLeod	Unknown
1977	(Scotland) Bobby Robinson	Unknown
29 Nov 1978	(Scotland) Iain Phillip	£25,000
6 Aug 1996	(Scotland) Neil Duffy	£200,000
3 Jun 2008	(Scotland) Scott Robertson	Bosman
23 Jun 2008	(Scotland) Paul Dixon	£25,000

=== Dundee United to Dundee ===
Date	Player	Fee
1947	(Scotland) George Mackay	Unknown
1948	(Scotland) Jack Court	Unknown
1971	(Scotland) Ian Scott	Unknown
1977	(Scotland) Billy Williamson	Unknown
13 Dec 1986	(Republic of Ireland) Tommy Coyne	£75,000
1995	(Scotland) Roy McBain	Unknown
3 Jun 1997	(Scotland) Jim McInally	Free
5 Jan 2019	(Scotland) Craig Curran	Free
26 Jan 2021	(Scotland) Paul McMullan	Loan
11 Jun 2021	(Scotland) Paul McMullan	Free

=== Complete list ===
In addition, other players have played for both clubs without moving directly between them. A list of all players to have played at least one first-team game for both clubs is displayed below.

Scotland

- Scott Allan
- Stuart Beedie
- Kenny Cameron
- Lyall Cameron
- Aaron Conway
- Craig Curran
- Jimmy Dickson
- Paul Dixon
- Billy Dodds
- Neil Duffy
- Iain Ferguson
- Thomas Flood
- Mark Fotheringham
- Scott Fraser
- Declan Gallagher
- Jock Gilmour
- Alan Gordon
- James Grady
- Jim Hamilton
- John Holt
- Kevin Holt
- Mark Kerr
- Billy Kirkwood
- Jim Lauchlan
- George Mackay
- Duncan MacLeod
- Lee Mair
- Collie Martin
- Roy McBain
- Tommy McDermott
- Kevin McDonald
- Jim McInally
- Stewart McKimmie

- Andy McLaren
- Gordon McLeod
- Paul McMullan
- John McQuillan
- James Angus Munro
- Simon Murray
- Stephen O'Donnell
- Kinnaird Ouchterlonie
- Iain Phillip
- Ian Redford
- Steven Robb
- Scott Robertson
- Bobby Robinson
- Jock Ross
- Craig Samson
- Ian Scott
- Rab Shannon
- Harry Smith
- Kevin Smith
- Alex Stuart
- Billy Thomson
- Lewis Toshney
- Gordon Wallace
- Lee Wilkie
- Billy Williamson

Unknown

- Tim Dailly

Argentina

- Beto Naveda

Australia

- Ryan McGowan

England

- Bert Dainty
- Albert Juliussen
- Fred Stoessel

Republic of Ireland

- Tommy Coyne
- David Worrell

Northern Ireland

- Trevor Carson
- Danny Griffin

Sweden

- Osman Sow

Wales

- Jack Court

Yugoslavia

- Dragutin Ristić

== Goal scorer records ==
Scorer	Team(s)	League	Scottish Cup	League Cup	Total
(Scotland) Paul Sturrock	Dundee United	11	1	2	14
(Scotland) Iain Ferguson	Dundee; Dundee United	7; 1	– 3	– 1	12
(Scotland) Kenny Cameron	Dundee United; Dundee	6; 2	– –	– 2	10
(Scotland) Ian Mitchell	Dundee United	8	–	1	9
(Scotland) Eamonn Bannon	Dundee United	7	2	–	9
(Scotland) Andy Campbell	Dundee	8	–	–	8
(Scotland) Jocky Scott	Dundee	8	–	–	8
(Scotland) Ralph Milne	Dundee United	8	–	–	8
(Scotland) Billy Dodds	Dundee United; Dundee	5; 2	– 1	– –	8
(Scotland) Keith Wright	Dundee	5	1	1	7
(Scotland) Dennis Gillespie	Dundee United	5	–	1	6
(Scotland) Gordon Wallace	Dundee; Dundee United	6 -	– –	– –	6
(Republic of Ireland) Tommy Coyne	Dundee; Dundee United	5; 1	– –	– –	6
(Scotland) Alan Gilzean	Dundee	4	–	2	6
(Scotland) John Clark	Dundee United	5	1	-	6
(Scotland) Willie Pettigrew	Dundee United	1	4	-	5
(Finland) Mixu Paatelainen	Dundee United	5	–	-	5
(Scotland) Paddy Connolly	Dundee United	5	–	-	5
(Scotland) Jim McIntyre	Dundee United	5	–	-	5
(England) Steve Lovell	Dundee	5	–	-	5
