= 1983–84 Dundee United F.C. season =

Dundee United
1983–84 season
- Chairman: George Fox
- Manager: Jim McLean
- Stadium: Tannadice Park
- Premier Division: Third place
- Scottish Cup: Quarter-finals
- League Cup: Semi-finals
- European Cup: Semi-finals
- Top goalscorer: League: Davie Dodds (15); All: Davie Dodds (26)
- Highest home attendance: 20,543 vs. Roma, European Cup, 11 April 1984
- Lowest home attendance: 4,441 vs. Ayr United, Scottish Cup, 6 February 1984

The 1983–84 season was the 75th year of football played by Dundee United, and covers the period from 1 July 1983 to 30 June 1984. United finished in third place, securing UEFA Cup football for the following season.

== Summary ==
Having won the Scottish Premier Division the previous season, the Terrors entered the European Cup for their first and only campaign in Europe's elite competition, reaching the semi-finals before narrowly losing to AS Roma, the Italian side later admitting to having attempted to bribe the match referee.

== Results and fixtures ==
Dundee United played a total of 58 competitive matches during the 1983–84 season. The team finished third in the Scottish Premier Division.

All results are written with Dundee United's score first. Own goals in italics

=== Scottish Premier Division ===
Date	Opponent	Venue	Result	Attendance	Scorers
20 August 1983	Motherwell	H	4–0	9,465	Kirkwood (2), Hegarty, Taylor
3 September 1983	Dundee	A	4–1	13,651	Reilly (2), Milne, Stark
10 September 1983	Hibernian	H	5–0	7,790	Dodds (2), Milne (2), Kirkwood
17 September 1983	St Johnstone	A	2–1	6,969	Dodds, Holt
24 September 1983	Aberdeen	A	2–1	21,093	Bannon, Kirkwood
1 October 1983	Rangers	H	0–2	16,738	
8 October 1983	Celtic	H	2–1	19,741	Kirkwood, Gough
22 October 1983	Heart of Midlothian	H	1–0	13,157	Dodds
29 October 1983	Motherwell	A	2–2	4,398	Dodds (2)
5 November 1983	Dundee	H	0–1	14,813	
12 November 1983	St Johnstone	H	7–0	7,937	Bannon (2 inc 1 pen), Dodds (2), Hegarty, Gough
19 November 1983	Rangers	A	0–0	27,842	
22 November 1983	St Mirren	A	0–4	4,408	
26 November 1983	Aberdeen	H	0–2	16,972	
3 December 1983	Hibernian	A	2–0	6,978	Milne, Stark
10 December 1983	Heart of Midlothian	A	0–0	9,199	
27 December 1983	Celtic	A	1–1	25,982	Bannon (penalty)
31 December 1983	Motherwell	H	2–1	6,967	Stark, Hegarty
7 January 1984	St Johnstone	A	2–1	5,066	Dodds (2)
11 February 1984	Hibernian	H	2–0	7,675	Hegarty, Malpas
25 February 1984	St Mirren	A	2–2	4,007	Kirkwood (2)
3 March 1984	Celtic	H	3–1	15,236	Bannon, Kirkwood, Dodds
11 March 1984	Heart of Midlothian	H	3–1	10,058	Coyne (2), Bannon
31 March 1984	Heart of Midlothian	A	0–0	7,852	
2 April 1984	Dundee	A	5–2	12,732	Malpas, Reilly, Dodds, Bannon, Milne
7 April 1984	Hibernian	A	0–1	4,266	
14 April 1984	St Johnstone	H	3–0	11,332	Sturrock, Reilly, Coyne
18 April 1984	Aberdeen	A	1–5	7,663	Reilly
21 April 1984	Dundee	H	1–1	13,244	Clark
28 April 1984	Motherwell	A	3–1	1,870	Dodds, Gough, Reilly
30 April 1984	St Mirren	H	2–0	5,347	Holt, Reilly
2 May 1984	Rangers	A	2–2	7,354	Sturrock, Dodds
5 May 1984	St Mirren	H	2–2	5,025	Sturrock, Narey
7 May 1984	Aberdeen	H	0–0	8,029	
12 May 1984	Celtic	A	1–1	10,281	Sturrock
14 May 1984	Rangers	H	0–1	6,473	

=== Scottish Cup ===
Date	Rd	Opponent	Venue	Result	Attendance	Scorers
6 February 1984	Third round	Ayr United	H	1–0	4,441	Sturrock
18 February 1984	Fourth round	Heart of Midlothian	H	2–1	14,731	Sturrock, Dodds
17 March 1984	Quarter-finals	Aberdeen	A	0–0	22,000	
28 March 1984	Quarter-finals replay	Aberdeen	H	0–1	16,094	

=== Scottish League Cup ===
Date	Rd	Opponent	Venue	Result	Attendance	Scorers
24 August 1983	Second round 1st leg	Dunfermline Athletic	H	6–1	5,324	Gough (2), Holt, Taylor, Dodds, Bannon
27 August 1983	Second round 2nd leg	Dunfermline Athletic	A	2–0	2,618	Gough, Dodds
30 August 1983	Group stage	Alloa Athletic	H	5–0	4,483	Dodds (3), Reilly (2)
7 September 1983	Group stage	Greenock Morton	A	1–1	2,500	Houston
5 October 1983	Group stage	Motherwell	H	4–2	5,731	Gough (2), Reilly, Bannon
26 October 1983	Group stage	Greenock Morton	H	3–0	6,645	Johnstone (2), Milne
9 November 1983	Group stage	Alloa Athletic	A	4–2	2,220	Dodds, Reilly, Bannon, Milne
30 November 1983	Group stage	Motherwell	A	3–0	1,319	Milne, McGinnis, Reilly
14 February 1984	Semi-finals 1st leg	Rangers	H	1–1	14,596	Dodds
22 February 1984	Semi-finals 2nd leg	Rangers	A	0–2	37,180	

=== European Cup ===
Date	Rd	Opponent	Venue	Result	Attendance	Scorers
14 September 1983	First round 1st leg	(Malta) Hamrun Spartans	A	3–0	12,300	Reilly, Bannon, Stark
28 September 1983	First round 2nd leg	(Malta) Hamrun Spartans	H	3–0	8,213	Milne (2), Kirkwood
19 October 1983	Second round 1st leg	(Belgium) Standard Liège	A	0–0	22,500	
2 November 1983	Second round 2nd leg	(Belgium) Standard Liège	H	4–0	16,674	Milne (2), Hegarty, Dodds
7 March 1984	Quarter-finals 1st leg	(Austria) Rapid Wien	A	1–2	38,266	Stark
21 March 1984	Quarter-finals 2nd leg	(Austria) Rapid Wien	H	1–0	18,865	Dodds
11 April 1984	Semi-finals 1st leg	(Italy) Roma	H	2–0	20,543	Dodds, Stark
25 April 1984	Semi-finals 1st leg	(Italy) Roma	A	0–3	68,060	

== Competitions ==
=== League table ===
Pos	Team	Pld	W	D	L	GF	GA	GD	Pts	Qualification or relegation
1	Aberdeen (C)	36	25	7	4	78	21	+57	57	Qualification for the European Cup first round
2	Celtic	36	21	8	7	80	41	+39	50	Qualification for the Cup Winners' Cup first round
3	Dundee United	36	18	11	7	67	39	+28	47	Qualification for the UEFA Cup first round
4	Rangers	36	15	12	9	53	41	+12	42	Qualification for the UEFA Cup first round
5	Heart of Midlothian	36	10	16	10	38	47	−9	36	Qualification for the UEFA Cup first round

Source: Statto
Rules for classification: 1) points; 2) goal difference; 3) number of goals scored.
(C) Champions

=== League cup table ===
Team	Pld	W	D	L	GF	GA	GD	Pts
Dundee United	6	5	1	0	20	5	+15	11
Motherwell	6	2	1	3	11	14	−3	5
Alloa Athletic	6	2	1	3	10	15	−5	5
Morton	6	1	1	4	7	14	−7	3

== See also ==
- 1983–84 in Scottish football
