= 1984–85 Dundee United F.C. season =

Dundee United
1984–85 season
- Chairman: George Fox
- Manager: Jim McLean
- Stadium: Tannadice Park
- Premier Division: Third place
- Scottish Cup: Runners-up
- League Cup: Runners-up
- UEFA Cup: Third round
- Top goalscorer: League: Paul Sturrock (14); All: Paul Sturrock (20)
- Highest home attendance: 21,944 vs. Aberdeen, Premier Division, 2 January 1985
- Lowest home attendance: 3,813 vs. St Mirren, Premier Division, 3 November 1984

The 1984–85 season was the 76th year of football played by Dundee United, and covers the period from 1 July 1984 to 30 June 1985. United finished in third place, securing UEFA Cup football for the following season.

== Summary ==
Dundee United played a total of 55 competitive matches during the 1984–85 season. The team finished third in the Scottish Premier Division.

In the cup competitions, United lost in the final of both the Scottish Cup and the Scottish League Cup to Celtic and Rangers respectively. Manchester United eliminated United in the third round of the UEFA Cup.

== Results and fixtures ==
All results are written with Dundee United's score first.

=== Scottish Premier Division ===
Date	Opponent	Venue	Result	Attendance	Scorers
11 August 1984	Heart of Midlothian	H	2–0	10,027	Milne (2)
18 August 1984	Celtic	A	1–1	18,905	Beedie
25 August 1984	Aberdenn	H	0–2	13,033	
1 September 1984	St Mirren	A	0–1	3,704	
8 September 1984	Dundee	H	3–4	14,190	Clark (2), Sturrock
15 September 1984	Greenock Morton	A	3–0	2,219	Dodds (2), Hegarty
22 September 1984	Hibernian	H	2–1	7,333	Milne, Sturrock
29 September 1984	Rangers	A	0–1	29,232	
6 October 1984	Dumbarton	H	1–0	5,852	Coyne
13 October 1984	Heart of Midlothian	A	0–2	7,066	
20 October 1984	Celtic	H	1–3	16,758	Bannon
3 November 1984	St Mirren	H	3–2	3,813	Bannon (2), Sturrock
10 November 1984	Dundee	A	2–0	14,423	Gough, Coyne
17 November 1984	Greenock Morton	H	7–0	8,562	Taylor, Sturrock (5), Malpas
24 November 1984	Hibernian	A	0–0	5,271	
1 December 1984	Rangers	H	1–1	16,477	Sturrock
8 December 1984	Dumbarton	A	2–2	1,524	Dodds, Bannon
15 December 1984	Heart of Midlothian	H	5–2	7,359	Hegarty, Bannon, Beedie, Taylor, Own goal
22 December 1984	Aberdeen	A	1–0	16,354	Gough
29 December 1984	Celtic	A	2–1	22,924	Sturrock, Gough
2 January 1985	Aberdeen	H	2–1	21,944	Dodds, Gough
5 January 1985	St Mirren	A	0–1	5,991	
2 February 1985	Hibernian	H	2–0	7,308	Kirkwood, Beaumont
9 February 1985	Rangers	A	0–0	19,730	
23 February 1985	Dumbarton	H	4–0	5,693	Milne, Reilly, Gough, Sturrock
2 March 1985	Celtic	H	0–0	16,493	
13 March 1985	Greenock Morton	A	3–0	909	Gough, Dodds (2)
16 March 1985	Heart of Midlothian	A	1–0	7,663	Malpas
23 March 1985	St Mirren	H	3–1	6,180	Bannon (2), Dodds
30 March 1985	Aberdeen	A	2–4	15,575	Bannon, Reilly
3 April 1985	Dundee	H	4–0	15,167	Bannon, Sturrock, Taylor, Dodds
6 April 1985	Greenock Morton	H	5–0	5,543	Taylor (2), Narey, Reilly, Bannon
20 April 1985	Hibernian	A	1–1	4,056	Beedie
27 April 1985	Dumbarton	A	2–0	818	Coyne, Sturrock
4 May 1985	Rangers	H	2–1	10,251	Sturrock, Clark
11 May 1985	Dundee	A	0–1	13,426	

=== Scottish Cup ===
Date	Rd	Opponent	Venue	Result	Attendance	Scorers
4 February 1985	Third round	Hibernian	H	3–0	10,125	Sturrock, Bannon, Kirkwood
16 February 1985	Fourth round	Queen of the South	A	3–0	3,400	Dodds (2), Bannon
9 March 1985	Quarter-finals	St Mirren	A	4–1	10,518	Gough, Dodds (2), Bannon
13 April 1985	Semi-finals	Aberdeen	N	0–0	18,485	
17 April 1985	Semi-finals replay	Aberdeen	N	2–1	10,771	Sturrock, Beedie
18 May 1985	Final	Celtic	N	1–2	59,256	Beedie

=== Scottish League Cup ===
Date	Rd	Opponent	Venue	Result	Attendance	Scorers
21 August 1984	Second round	Forfar	H	5–0	5,337	Sturrock, Reilly, Beedie (2), Bannon
29 August 1984	Third round	Dumbarton	A	4–0	2,500	Dodds (2), Milne (2)
5 September 1984	Fourth round	Celtic	H	2–1(aet)	21,182	Sturrock, Clark
26 September 1984	Semi-finals 1st leg	Heart of Midlothian	A	2–1	10,541	Clark (2)
10 October 1984	Semi-finals 2nd leg	Heart of Midlothian	H	3–1	13,468	Bannon, Dodds, Kirkwood
28 October 1984	Final	Rangers	N	0–1	41,526	

=== UEFA Cup ===
Date	Rd	Opponent	Venue	Result	Attendance	Scorers
19 September 1984	First round 1st leg	(Sweden) AIK	A	0–1	5,721	
3 October 1984	First round 2nd leg	(Sweden) AIK	H	3–0	11,427	Sturrock, Milne (2)
24 October 1984	Second round 1st leg	(Austria) LASK	A	2–1	18,500	Kirkwood, Bannon
7 November 1984	Second round 2nd leg	(Austria) LASK	H	5–1	10,185	Hegarty, Coyne (2), Gough, Beaumont
28 November 1984	Third round 1st leg	(England) Manchester United	A	2–2	48,278	Hegarty, Sturrock
12 December 1984	Third round 2nd leg	(England) Manchester United	H	2–3	21,821	Dodds, Hegarty

== Competitions ==
=== League table ===
Pos	Team	Pld	W	D	L	GF	GA	GD	Pts	Qualification or relegation
1	Aberdeen (C)	36	27	5	4	89	26	+63	59	Qualification for the European Cup first round
2	Celtic	36	22	8	6	77	30	+47	52	Qualification for the Cup Winners' Cup first round
3	Dundee United	36	20	7	9	67	33	+34	47	Qualification for the UEFA Cup first round
4	Rangers	36	13	12	11	47	38	+9	38	Qualification for the UEFA Cup first round
5	St Mirren	36	17	4	15	51	56	−5	38	Qualification for the UEFA Cup first round

Source: Statto
Rules for classification: 1) points; 2) goal difference; 3) number of goals scored.
(C) Champions

== See also ==
- 1984–85 in Scottish football
