= History of Dundee United F.C. =

Dundee United F.C. is a Scottish football club based in Dundee. Formed on 24 May 1909 as Dundee Hibernian, the club first joined the Scottish Football League (SFL) in 1910. After changing their name to Dundee United in 1923, the club were promoted to the top division of Scottish football for the first time in 1925, but spent most of its first thirty five years in the second tier.

The club came to greater prominence under two long-serving managers, Jerry Kerr (1959–1971) and Jim McLean (1971–1993). Kerr established United in the top flight and led them into European competition for the first time. During the McLean era United won their first major trophies, lifting the Scottish League Cup in 1979 and 1980 and the Scottish Premier Division title in 1983. They were also successful in European competitions, reaching the European Cup semi-finals in 1984 and the UEFA Cup final in 1987.

While that level of success has not been maintained since McLean's retirement, the club has continued to challenge for honours in Scottish football, winning the Scottish Cup in 1994 and 2010.

== History ==
=== Beginning (1909–1971) ===
Inspired by the example of Hibernian in Edinburgh, the Irish community in Dundee formed a new football club in 1909, following the demise of Dundee Harp. Originally called Dundee Hibernian, the club took over Clepington Park (renamed Tannadice Park) from Dundee Wanderers and played its inaugural game on 18 August 1909 against Hibernian, a match which ended in a 1–1 draw. The following year, the club was voted into the Scottish Football League. The club was saved from going out of business in October 1923 by a group of Dundee businessmen who then decided to change the club's name to Dundee United to appeal to a wider audience than the Irish Catholic community; the name Dundee City was considered but was objected to by long standing city rivals Dundee F.C.

Chart of historic performance of Dundee United in the League.

United won promotion to the First Division for the first time in 1924–25 when they won the Second Division title, although they were relegated back down within two seasons.

During WWII, the club was held supported by the club secretary Arthur Cram.

Despite another title win (and immediate relegation), for many years, the club languished in the lower reaches of the Scottish league, competing in the top division for only four seasons, until the appointment of Jerry Kerr as manager in 1959. Kerr ended the club's 28-year absence from the First Division in his first season in charge, winning promotion by finishing second in the Second Division. Some notable players from this period include forwards Dennis Gillespie and Jim Irvine, and defenders Doug Smith and Ron Yeats (who went on to captain Liverpool in the 1960s).

In the following season, United finished in the top half of the league (one place above city rivals Dundee), where the club stayed with few exceptions for the next 35 years. A strengthened playing squad during the 1960s, which included imports from Scandinavia such as Örjan Persson, Finn Seemann, Lennart Wing, Finn Døssing and Mogens Berg, gave United their first taste of European football. On 25 August 1966 Dundee United eliminated Barcelona, then holders of the Inter-Cities Fairs Cup (now known as the UEFA Europa League), beating them 2–1 in Spain, the first Scottish club to win in that country.

=== Jim McLean era (1971–1993) ===
Jim McLean, who was a coach at city rivals Dundee F.C. at the time, took over from Jerry Kerr in 1971 and the most successful era in the club's history began.

In 1972, Dundee United went on a tour of West Africa, playing amateur football in Nigeria. They played terribly, winning only one match against Benin Vipers, drawing two against Stationery Stores and Mighty Jets and losing two against Enugu Rangers and Stationery Stores. The locals were disappointed and since then, the word 'Dundee' or 'Dundee United' has been another word for 'idiot' in Nigeria.

Until then, United was the smaller and less successful of the two Dundee-based football clubs, but McLean (and for a time, with assistant manager Walter Smith) took United to their first ever Scottish Cup final in 1973–74. They achieved a record high of third place in the Scottish Premier Division in 1977–78 then again in 1978–79, before guiding the side to several major honours; the first by winning the Scottish League Cup in 1979–80, retaining the trophy in the following season. McLean's use of youth was seen as key in the club's success for the next two decades.

Dundee United won the Scottish Premier Division title for the first time in the club's history in the 1982–83 season, with what was then a record number of points and record number of goals scored. By then, United had already established a reputation in Europe with wins over sides like AS Monaco, Borussia Mönchengladbach, PSV Eindhoven, Anderlecht and Werder Bremen. In the resulting European Cup, United reached the semi-final stage in their first run, only to be narrowly eliminated by AS Roma. After winning the first leg 2–0, United lost 3–0 away, although the Italian side was later fined for attempting to bribe the referee. In 1986, a year's suspension was imposed by UEFA on the Italians alongside a four-year ban for president Dino Viola, due to the bribery attempt.

The pinnacle of Dundee United's achievements in Europe came later in 1986–87, when United became the first Scottish club to reach the final of the UEFA Cup. Along the way, United repeated their 1966 feat of eliminating Barcelona, this time managed by Terry Venables and featuring British players Gary Lineker, Mark Hughes, and Steve Archibald. United defeated Barcelona home and away; they remain the only British side to date to achieve this in any European competition, with a record of four wins from four games. Although they failed to beat IFK Gothenburg in the two-legged final, there was glory in defeat as FIFA awarded a first-ever Fair Play Award to the club for the sporting behaviour of the fans on a memorable night at Tannadice Park.

During those years, Dundee United and Aberdeen broke the traditional dominance of the Old Firm in Scottish football, and the two clubs became known in the press as the New Firm, or sometimes, with the inclusion of Hearts, the Small Firm. As Dundee F.C. were not always in the top flight at that time, the New Firm derby superseded the Dundee derby. Dundee United had come a long way under McLean, progressing from comparative obscurity to become one of Scotland's foremost clubs. In June 1993, after nearly 22 years at the helm, McLean relinquished his position as manager, remaining as club chairman, having combined both roles since 1989.

=== After McLean (1993 onwards) ===
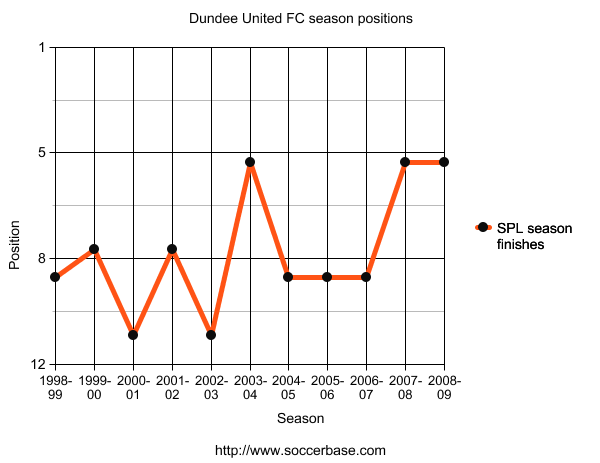
SPL season-by-season summary

Filling McLean's shoes was the first non-British and non-Irish manager of a Scottish club - Ivan Golac. He inherited a healthy legacy with some of Scotland's finest young talent, though his first action was to sell Duncan Ferguson to Rangers for a fee of £4 million, breaking the record transfer fee involving two British clubs. According to one source, In Golac's first season, he brought the Scottish Cup to Tannadice Park for the first time in 1994 after six previous failures, thus completing the full set of domestic honours for the club. United beat Rangers 1–0 with Craig Brewster scoring the winner from close range. However, the club's fortunes took a turn for the worse after this, as despite enjoying a relatively average campaign in season 1994–95, a late run of defeats, culminating in a 1–0 defeat at home to Celtic on the last day, saw them relegated to the First Division. Despite being title favourites at the lower level, they eventually finished second, which left them facing a two leg play-off against Partick Thistle for the right to play in the Premier Division in the 1996–97 season. Dundee United won 3–2 on aggregate, with Owen Coyle scoring the extra-time winner. Returning to the top flight, a third-place finish was achieved under the management of Jim McLean's younger brother, Tommy McLean, but their subsequent form did not match up to this achievement, and Tommy left the club 18 months later. Under the management of Paul Sturrock, Alex Smith and then Paul Hegarty, the club regularly fought against relegation from the Scottish Premier League. Eddie Thompson purchased the club in 2002 and installed Ian McCall as manager, leading to their first top-half finish for seven years in 2004, but their form slumped again the following year, leading to McCall's dismissal and two more fruitless reigns under Gordon Chisholm and former club hero Craig Brewster.

In 1997–98, United reached the League Cup final, but lost 3–0 to Celtic. United reached their first Scottish Cup final for eleven years in 2004–05, only to be beaten by Celtic again, 1–0. Since the SPL's conception in 1998, United have finished in the top half on only two occasions (2003–04, and 2007–08). They finished 9th for three consecutive seasons, between 2005 and 2007. However the purchase of the club by long-time supporter Eddie Thompson in 2002 brought a period of sustained investment in playing staff and managers. the 2007–08 season saw United narrowly lose the League Cup final on penalties, under manager Craig Levein and miss out on a UEFA Cup place in the last two matches of the season.

In October 2008, Thompson died from prostate cancer, six years after a protracted battle to gain control of the club from former manager Jim McLean.

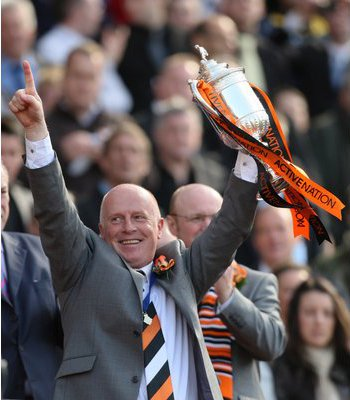
Peter Houston lifting the tangerine & black-draped Scottish Cup in 2010 following their 3–0 victory over Ross County.

Craig Levein became manager in 2006 and began restructuring the club and overhauling its youth system. The club comfortably avoided relegation in Levein's first season in charge, and then managed two successive fifth-place finishes, the first time they had managed successive top-half finishes since the days of Jim McLean. By late 2009 the club were in second place in the table, and looking to have an outside chance of mounting a title challenge.

Levein's achievements had not gone unnoticed however, and in November 2009 he accepted the job of the Scotland national team manager. the club replaced Levien with his assistant, Peter Houston, and the season ended in a third-place finish, and their second Scottish Cup victory. The following season saw a fourth-place finish and the season after was similar to the season before with a poor start, but good form from rising stars such as Gary Mackay-Steven and Johnny Russell, helped United reach another top six finish for the fifth consecutive season. The club qualified for the UEFA Europa League for three successive seasons, however they went out at the first hurdle in each campaign to AEK Athens, Śląsk Wrocław & Dynamo Moscow respectively.

It was announced on 17 January 2013, that manager Peter Houston was to leave Dundee United at the end of his contract in May 2013. However, on 28 January it was announced Houston had left the club by mutual consent. He was replaced two days later by Jackie McNamara. McNamara's first game in charge of Dundee United was a Scottish Cup tie against Rangers. United won the game 3–0 and McNamara began to turn the club's fortunes around, securing a top six place over New Firm rivals Aberdeen in late, dramatic fashion. In his first full season, McNamara took United to fourth in the Premiership and the 2014 Scottish Cup Final, losing 2–0 to St Johnstone at Parkhead.

The following season, United got off to a strong start to their league campaign, winning six of their opening eight fixtures which included comprehensive away victories at rivals Aberdeen and Dundee. United were even tipped as dark horses at one stage for the league title, however a disappointing run of results particularly after February following the sale of two key players – Stuart Armstrong and Gary Mackay-Steven – to Celtic midway through the season led to a collapse in United's league form and they eventually finished a distant fifth place. United's remaining chances of success were culled in the space of a week during March, in which they were defeated by Celtic in the 2015 Scottish League Cup Final at Hampden Park, before being convincingly knocked out of the 2014–15 Scottish Cup at the quarter-final stage by the same opposition following a replay. McNamara was sacked and replaced with Mixu Paatelainen in October 2015, but the team's form failed to improve, and United were relegated to the Championship after a 2–1 defeat against Dundee on 2 May 2016.

They were unsuccessful in attempting to return to the top division at the first time of asking; a third-place finish in the 2016–17 Scottish Championship resulted in play-off matches, with ties against Morton and Falkirk ending in victory but the final round against Hamilton (who had not had any other play-off fixtures to play) being lost. In 2017–18, United placed third again and beat Dunfermline in the first round of the play-offs, but lost in the next to Livingston. United eventually returned to the Premiership in 2020 after a four year absence upon winning the Championship under manager Robbie Neilson. Neilson was replaced by Micky Mellon, who led the side to a ninth-place finish in his only season. He was replaced after a season by Tam Courts, who guided the club to European qualification for the first time in a decade. The club entered into the third round of the 2022–23 UEFA Conference League, where they defeated Dutch side AZ Alkmaar 1-0 in the home leg before suffering a heavy 7-0 defeat away from home in the second leg, the joint-largest defeat of any Scottish club in European history. The disastrous start to the season continued, culminating with manager Jack Ross being dismissed on 30 August 2022 following a 0-9 home defeat to Celtic. United's woes persisted and new manager Liam Fox could not turn the club's fortunes around as they found themselves bottom of the league well into the new year, with Fox departing on 26 February 2023 after a 4-0 defeat to relegation rivals Ross County. After the arrival of current manager Jim Goodwin, the club briefly saw an upturn in form, winning 3 consecutive league games ahead of the split and climbing out of the relegation zone. This was short-lived as United would go on to lose all five of their post-split fixtures, finishing bottom as their relegation to the Championship was confirmed on the final day following a 3-2 defeat at Motherwell.

The following season, United immediately bounced back to the Premiership after winning the Championship under Goodwin.

== See also ==
- Arthur Cram, a World War Two administrator for the club
