= 1980–81 Dundee United F.C. season =

Dundee United
1980–81 season
- Manager: Jim McLean
- Stadium: Tannadice Park
- Scottish Premier Division: 3rd (UEFA Cup); W18 D11 L7 F67 A39 P47
- Scottish Cup: Runners-up
- League Cup: Winners
- UEFA Cup: Round 2

The 1980–81 season was the 72nd year of football played by Dundee United, and covers the period from 1 July 1980 to 30 June 1981. United finished in third place, securing UEFA Cup football for the following season.

== Match results ==
Dundee United played a total of 58 competitive matches during the 1980–81 season.

=== Legend ===
Win
Draw
Loss

All results are written with Dundee United's score first. Own goals in italics

=== Premier Division ===
Date	Opponent	Venue	Result	Attendance	Scorers
9 August 1980	Kilmarnock	H	2–2	5,788	Payne, Sturrock
16 August 1980	Aberdeen	A	1–1	12,948	Hegarty
23 August 1980	Greenock Morton	H	1–1	5,339	Bannon
6 September 1980	Rangers	H	2–4	16,269	Dodds, Payne
13 September 1980	Airdrieonians	A	0–0	2,721	
20 September 1980	St Mirren	A	0–2	5,783	
27 September 1980	Heart of Midlothian	H	1–1	6,263	Dodds
4 October 1980	Celitc	A	0–2	19,571	
11 October 1980	Partick Thistle	H	0–0	4,706	
18 October 1980	Kilmarnock	A	1–0	2,719	Pettigrew
25 October 1980	Aberdeen	H	1–3	10,043	Sturrock
1 November 1980	Greenock Morton	A	2–0	3,075	Kirkwood (2)
8 November 1980	Heart of Midlothian	H	3–0	5,875	Sturrock (2), Hegarty
15 November 1980	St Mirren	H	2–0	5,024	Dodds, Sturrock
22 November 1980	Partick Thistle	A	3–2	3,089	Pettigrew, Sturrock, Bannon
29 November 1980	Celtic	H	0–3	13,080	
13 December 1980	Airdrieonians	H	1–0	4,780	Dodds
20 December 1980	St Mirren	A	3–3	5,405	Dodds, Gibson, Pettigrew
27 December 1980	Heart of Midlothian	H	4–1	6,928	Sturrock (2), Milne (2)
30 December 1980	Aberdeen	A	1–1	22,556	Dodds
3 January 1981	Kilmarnock	H	7–0	6,474	Kirkwood (2), Gibson, Dodds, Milne, Addison, Bannon (penalty)
10 January 1981	Celtic	A	1–2	22,132	Milne
31 January 1981	Airdrieonians	A	5–0	2,264	Dodds (3), Bannon (penalty), Sturrock
7 February 1981	Rangers	H	2–1	14,528	Kirkwood, Dodds
21 February 1981	Greenock Morton	H	1–0	4,836	Hegarty
28 February 1981	Kilmarnock	A	1–0	2,102	Dodds
14 March 1981	Partick Thistle	A	2–0	2,754	Pettigrew, Milne
18 March 1981	Rangers	A	4–1	11,208	Bannon (2), Kirkwood, Sturrock
21 March 1981	St Mirren	H	1–2	5,808	Pettigrew
28 March 1981	Heart of Midlothian	A	4–0	3,786	Sturrock (2), Kirkwood
4 April 1981	Rangers	A	1–2	11,690	Milne
18 April 1981	Greenock Morton	A	0–2	2,262	
22 April 1981	Celtic	H	2–3	15,349	Pettigrew, Sturrock
25 April 1981	Aberdeen	H	0–0	6,369	
29 April 1981	Airdrieonians	H	4–1	3,133	Kirkwood (2), Bannon, Milne
2 May 1981	Partick Thistle	H	3–2	4,124	Dodds (2), Bannon (penalty)

=== Scottish Cup ===
Date	Rd	Opponent	Venue	Result	Attendance	Scorers
24 January 1981	R3	Brechin City	A	2–1	5,791	Dodds, Kirkwood
14 February 1981	R4	Partick Thistle	H	1–0	7,758	Addison
7 March 1981	QF	Motherwell	H	6–1	10,236	Dodds (3), Sturrock, Kirkwood, Narey
11 April 1981	SF	Celtic	N	0–0	40,390	
15 April 1981	SF R	Celtic	N	3–2	32,328	Hegarty (2), Bannon
9 May 1981	F	Rangers	N	0–0	53,358	
12 May 1981	F R	Rangers	N	1–4	42,004	Dodds

=== League Cup ===
Date	Rd	Opponent	Venue	Result	Attendance	Scorers
13 August 1980	R1	East Fife	A	5–2	2,028	Milne (2), Ward, Sturrock (penalty), Narey
20 August 1980	R1	East Fife	H	4–0	3,237	Ward (2), Hegarty, Payne
27 August 1980	R2	Cowdenbeath	H	4–0	3,401	Bannon (2), Sturrock, Hegarty
30 August 1980	R2	Cowdenbeath	A	2–1	1,238	Ward (2), Hegarty, Sturrock
3 September 1980	R3	Motherwell	A	1–2	3,327	Addison
24 September 1980	R3	Motherwell	H	4–2	5,628	Sturrock (2), Holt, Milne
8 October 1980	QF 1	Clydebank	A	1–2	1,653	Bannon
29 October 1980	QF 2	Clydebank	H	4–1	5,265	Ward (2), Sturrock, Hegarty
12 November 1980	SF 1	Celtic	H	1–1	14,517	Bannon
19 November 1980	SF 2	Celtic	A	3–0	19,700	Pettigrew, Sturrock, Dodds
6 December 1980	F	Dundee	A	3–0	24,466	Sturrock (2), Dodds

=== UEFA Cup ===
Date	Rd	Opponent	Venue	Result	Attendance	Scorers
17 September 1980	R1 1	(Poland) Slask Wroclaw	A	0–0	10,000	
1 October 1980	R1 2	(Poland) Slask Wroclaw	H	7–2	8,415	Pettigrew (2), Dodds (2), Stark, Hegarty, Payne
22 October 1980	R2 1	(Belgium) KSC Lokeren	H	1–1	7,663	Pettigrew
5 November 1980	R2 2	(Belgium) KSC Lokeren	A	0–0	9,000	

== League table ==
Pos	Team	Pld	W	D	L	GF	GA	GD	Pts	Qualification or relegation
3	Rangers	36	16	12	8	60	32	+28	44	Qualification for the Cup Winners' Cup first round
4	St Mirren	36	18	8	10	56	47	+9	44	
5	Dundee United	36	17	9	10	66	42	+24	43	Qualification for the UEFA Cup first round
6	Partick Thistle	36	10	10	16	32	48	−16	30	
7	Airdrieonians	36	10	9	17	36	55	−19	29	

Source: Statto
Rules for classification: 1) points; 2) goal difference; 3) number of goals scored.

== See also ==
- 1980–81 in Scottish football
