= 1983–84 Celtic F.C. season =

Celtic
1983–84 season
- Chairman: Desmond White (footballer)
- Manager: Davie Hay
- Stadium: Celtic Park
- Scottish Premier Division: 2nd
- Scottish Cup: Finalists
- Scottish League Cup: Finalists
- UEFA Cup: 3rd Round
- Top goalscorer: League: Brian McClair 23; All: Brian McClair 31
- Highest home attendance: 53,229
- Lowest home attendance: 4,956
- Average home league attendance: 18,390

During the 1983–84 Scottish football season, Celtic competed in the Scottish Premier Division.

== Competitions ==
=== Scottish Premier Division ===
==== League table ====
Pos	Team	Pld	W	D	L	GF	GA	GD	Pts	Qualification or relegation
1	Aberdeen (C)	36	25	7	4	78	21	+57	57	Qualification for the European Cup first round
2	Celtic	36	21	8	7	80	41	+39	50	Qualification for the Cup Winners' Cup first round
3	Dundee United	36	18	11	7	67	39	+28	47	Qualification for the UEFA Cup first round
4	Rangers	36	15	12	9	53	41	+12	42	Qualification for the UEFA Cup first round
5	Heart of Midlothian	36	10	16	10	38	47	−9	36	Qualification for the UEFA Cup first round

Source: Statto
Rules for classification: 1) points; 2) goal difference; 3) number of goals scored.
(C) Champions

==== Matches ====
20 August 1983 Premier League	Hibernian	0–2	Celtic	Edinburgh
15:00				Stadium: Easter Road; Attendance: 15,084

3 September 1983 Premier League	Celtic	2–1	Rangers	Glasgow
15:00				Stadium: Celtic Park; Attendance: 50,662

10 September 1983 Premier League	Celtic	5–2	St Johnstone	Glasgow
15:00				Stadium: Celtic Park; Attendance: 11,161

17 September 1983 Premier League	Motherwell	0–3	Celtic	Motherwell
15:00				Stadium: Fir Park; Attendance: 14,255

24 September 1983 Premier League	Dundee	2–6	Celtic	Dundee
15:00 BST				Stadium: Dens Park; Attendance: 11,407

1 October 1983 Premier League	Celtic	1–1	St Mirren	Glasgow
15:00 BST				Stadium: Celtic Park; Attendance: 15,289

8 October 1983 Premier League	Dundee United	2–1	Celtic	Dundee
15:00 BST				Stadium: Tannadice Park; Attendance: 19,741

15 October 1983 Premier League	Celtic	1–1	Hearts	Glasgow
15:00 BST				Stadium: Celtic Park; Attendance: 20,207

22 October 1983 Premier League	Aberdeen	3–1	Celtic	Aberdeen
15:00 BST				Stadium: Pittodrie Stadium; Attendance: 22,082

29 October 1983 Premier League	Celtic	5–1	Hibernian	Glasgow
15:00 BST				Stadium: Celtic Park; Attendance: 13,777

5 November 1983 Premier League	Rangers	1–2	Celtic	Glasgow
15:00 BST				Stadium: Ibrox Stadium; Attendance: 40,760

12 November 1983 Premier League	Celtic	4–0	Motherwell	Glasgow
15:00 GMT				Stadium: Celtic Park; Attendance: 13,408

19 November 1983 Premier League	St Mirren	4–2	Celtic	Paisley
15:00 GMT				Stadium: St Mirren Park, Love Street; Attendance: 13,169

26 November 1983 Premier League	Celtic	1–0	Dundee	Glasgow
15:00 GMT				Stadium: Celtic Park; Attendance: 14,583

3 December 1983 Premier League	St Johnstone	0–3	Celtic	Perth
15:00 GMT				Stadium: Muirton Park; Attendance: 8,153

10 December 1983 Premier League	Celtic	0–0	Aberdeen	Glasgow
15:00 GMT				Stadium: Celtic Park; Attendance: 25,867

17 December 1983 Premier League	Hearts	1–3	Celtic	Edinburgh
15:00 GMT				Stadium: Tynecastle Park; Attendance: 14,685

27 December 1983 Premier League	Celtic	1–1	Dundee United	Glasgow
15:00 GMT				Stadium: Celtic Park; Attendance: 25,982

31 December 1983 Premier League	Hibernian	0–1	Celtic	Edinburgh
15:00 GMT				Stadium: Easter Road; Attendance: 10,204

7 January 1984 Premier League	Motherwell	2–2	Celtic	Motherwell
15:00 GMT				Stadium: Fir Park; Attendance: 11,268

4 February 1984 Premier League	Aberdeen	1–0	Celtic	Aberdeen
15:00 GMT				Stadium: Pittodrie Stadium; Attendance: 21,461

11 February 1984 Premier League	Celtic	5–2	St Johnstone	Glasgow
15:00 GMT				Stadium: Celtic Park; Attendance: 9,439

14 February 1984 Premier League	Celtic	2–0	St Mirren	Glasgow
19:30 GMT				Stadium: Celtic Park; Attendance: 9,835

25 February 1984 Premier League	Celtic	4–1	Hearts	Glasgow
15:00 GMT				Stadium: Celtic Park; Attendance: 17,950

3 March 1984 Premier League	Dundee United	3–1	Celtic	Dundee
15:00 GMT				Stadium: Tannadice Park; Attendance: 15,236

20 March 1984 Premier League	Dundee	3–2	Celtic	Dundee
15:00 GMT				Stadium: Dens Park; Attendance: 7,746

31 March 1984 Premier League	Celtic	1–0	Aberdeen	Glasgow
15:00 GMT				Stadium: Celtic Park; Attendance: 19,193

2 April 1984 Premier League	Celtic	3–0	Rangers	Glasgow
19:30 GMT				Stadium: Celtic Park; Attendance: 53,229

7 April 1984 Premier League	St Johnstone	0–0	Celtic	Perth
15:00 GMT				Stadium: Muirton Park; Attendance: 6,677

10 April 1984 Premier League	Celtic	4–2	Motherwell	Glasgow
19:30 BST				Stadium: Celtic Park; Attendance: 5,673

18 April 1984 Premier League	St Mirren	2–4	Celtic	Paisley
19:30 BST				Stadium: St Mirren Park, Love Street; Attendance: 6,122

21 April 1984 Premier League	Rangers	1–0	Celtic	Glasgow
15:00 BST				Stadium: Ibrox Stadium; Attendance: 40,286

24 April 1984 Premier League	Celtic	3–0	Dundee	Glasgow
19:30 BST				Stadium: Celtic Park; Attendance: 4,596

28 April 1984 Premier League	Celtic	3–2	Hibernian	Glasgow
15:00 BST				Stadium: Celtic Park; Attendance: 9,533

5 May 1984 Premier League	Hearts	1–1	Celtic	Edinburgh
15:00 BST				Stadium: Tynecastle Park; Attendance: 12,071

12 May 1984 Premier League	Celtic	1–1	Dundee United	Glasgow
15:00 BST				Stadium: Celtic Park; Attendance: 10,281

=== Scottish Cup ===
28 January 1984 Third round	Berwick Rangers	0–4	Celtic	Berwick
15:00 GMT				Stadium: Shielfield Park; Attendance: 5,510

18 February 1984 Fourth round	East Fife	0–6	Celtic	Methil
15:00 GMT				Stadium: Bayview Park; Attendance: 10,000

17 March 1984 Fifth round	Motherwell	0–6	Celtic	Motherwell
15:00 GMT				Stadium: Fir Park; Attendance: 14,795

14 April 1984 Semi-final	St Mirren	1–2	Celtic	Glasgow
15:00 GMT				Stadium: Hampden Park; Attendance: 25,040

19 May 1984 Final	Celtic	1–2 (aet)	Aberdeen	Glasgow
15:00 GMT				Stadium: Hampden Park; Attendance: 55,808

=== Scottish League Cup ===
23 August 1983 2nd round 1st leg	Brechin City	0–1	Celtic	Brechin
19:30 GMT				Stadium: Glebe Park; Attendance: 2,620

27 August 1983 2nd round 2nd leg	Celtic	0–0	Brechin City	Glasgow
15:00 GMT				Stadium: Celtic Park; Attendance: 8,502

31 August 1983 Group stage	Airdrieonians	1–6	Celtic	Airdrie
19:30 GMT				Stadium: Broomfield Park; Attendance: 6,807

7 September 1983 Group stage	Celtic	5–1	Hibernian	Glasgow
19:30 GMT				Stadium: Celtic Park; Attendance: 11,046

5 October 1983 Group stage	Celtic	1–1	Kilmarnock	Glasgow
19:30 GMT				Stadium: Celtic Park; Attendance: 5,435

26 October 1983 Group stage	Hibernian	0–0	Celtic	Edinburgh
19:30 GMT				Stadium: Easter Road; Attendance: 6,882

9 November 1983 Group stage	Celtic	0–0	Airdrieonians	Glasgow
19:30 GMT				Stadium: Celtic Park; Attendance: 5,216

30 November 1983 Group stage	Kilmarnock	0–1	Celtic	Kilmarnock
19:30 GMT				Stadium: Rugby Park; Attendance: 8,973

22 February 1984 Semi-finals 1st leg	Aberdeen	0–0	Celtic	Aberdeen
19:30 GMT				Stadium: Pittodrie Stadium; Attendance: 20,067

10 March 1984 Semi-final 2nd leg	Celtic	1–0	Aberdeen	Glasgow
19:30 GMT				Stadium: Celtic Park; Attendance: 41,169

25 March 1984 Final	Celtic	2–3	Rangers	Glasgow
19:30 GMT				Stadium: Hampden Park; Attendance: 62,459

=== UEFA Cup ===
14 September 1983 1st round 1st leg	Celtic (Scotland)	1–0	(Denmark) AGF Aarhus	Glasgow
20:00 GMT				Stadium: Celtic Park; Attendance: 23,569

28 September 1983 1st round 2nd leg	AGF Aarhus (Denmark)	1–4 (1–5 agg.)	(Scotland) Celtic	Aarhus
20:00 GMT				Stadium: Atletion; Attendance: 14,500

19 October 1983 2nd round 1st leg	Sporting CP (Portugal)	2–0	(Scotland) Celtic	Lisbon
20:00 GMT				Stadium: Estádio José Alvalade; Attendance: 57,500

2 November 1983 2nd round 2nd leg	Celtic (Scotland)	5–0 (5–2 agg.)	(Portugal) Sporting CP	Glasgow
20:00 GMT				Stadium: Celtic Park; Attendance: 39,183

23 November 1983 3rd Round 1st leg	Nottingham Forest (England)	0–0	(Scotland) Celtic	Nottingham
20:00 GMT				Stadium: City Ground; Attendance: 32,017

7 December 1983 3rd Round 2nd leg	Celtic (Scotland)	1–2 (1–2 agg.)	(England) Nottingham Forest	Glasgow
20:00 GMT				Stadium: Celtic Park; Attendance: 66,938

=== Glasgow Cup ===
9 August 1983 Semi-final	Partick Thistle	0–2	Celtic	Glasgow
19:30 GMT				Stadium: Firhill Park; Attendance: 9,429

13 August 1983 Final	Rangers	1–0	Celtic	Glasgow
15:00 GMT				Stadium: Hampden Park; Attendance: 32,700

== Staff ==
Board of Directors
Position	Name
Chairman	Desmond White
Vice-Chairman	Thomas Devlin
Secretary	Desmond White
Directors	James Farrell Kevin Kelly Jack McGinn Christopher White

Football Staff
Position	Name
Manager	Davie Hay
Assistant Manager	Frank Connor
Coach	Bobby Lennox
Physio	Brian Scott
Masseur	Jimmy Steele
Kitman	Neil Mochan

== Transfers ==
Transfers In
Date	Name	From	Transfer Fee
May 1983	Brian McClair	Motherwell F.C.	£70,000
August 1983	Brian Whittaker	Partick Thistle F.C.	£50,000
August 1983	Jim Melrose	Coventry City F.C.	£100,000
November 1983	John Colquhoun	Stirling Albion F.C.	£60,000
		Total Transfer Fees	£280,000

Transfers Out
Date	Name	To	Transfer Fee
May 1983	John Sludden	St Johnstone F.C.	Free Transfer
June 1983	Charlie Nicholas	Arsenal F.C.	£750,000
June 1983	Dom Sullivan	Greenock Morton F.C.	Free Transfer
July 1983	George McCluskey	Leeds United F.C.	£140,000
August 1983	John Buckley	Partick Thistle F.C.	Free Transfer
October 1983	David Moyes	Cambridge United F.C.	£20,000
November 1983	Danny Crainie	Wolverhampton Wanderers F.C.	£20,000
March 1984	Jim Dobbin (footballer)	Doncaster Rovers F.C.	£25,000
		Total Transfer Fees	£955,000
