= Thomas Flood =

Thomas Flood may refer to:

- Thomas S. Flood (Medal of Honor) (1840–?), American Civil War sailor and Medal of Honor recipient
- Thomas H. Flood (1804–1873), Delegate and Senator to the General Assembly of Virginia
- Thomas S. Flood (politician) (1844–1908), U.S. Representative from New York
- Thomas Flood (astronomer) (1919–1988), Scottish amateur astronomer
- Tom Flood (born 1955), Australian novelist
- Tom Flood (footballer) (fl. 1909–1918), Scottish footballer
- Tim Flood (baseball) (Thomas Timothy Flood, 1877–1929), American baseball player
