= 1981–82 Dundee United F.C. season =

Dundee United
1981–82 season
- Manager: Jim McLean
- Stadium: Tannadice Park
- Scottish Premier Division: 4th (UEFA Cup); W15 D10 L11 F61 A38 P40
- Scottish Cup: Quarter-final
- League Cup: Finalists
- UEFA Cup: Quarter-final

The 1981–82 season was the 73rd year of football played by Dundee United, and covers the period from 1 July 1981 to 30 June 1982. United finished in third place, securing UEFA Cup football for the following season.

== Match results ==
Dundee United played a total of 60 competitive matches during the 1981–82 season.

=== Legend ===
Win
Draw
Loss

All results are written with Dundee United's score first. Own goals in italics

=== Premier Division ===
| Date | Opponent | Venue | Result | Attendance | Scorers |
|---|---|---|---|---|---|
| 29 August 1981 | Aberdeen | H | 4–1 | 10,598 | Sturrock, Holt, Pettigrew, Bannon |
| 5 September 1981 | Greenock Morton | A | 0–1 | 3,335 | |
| 12 September 1981 | Dundee | H | 5–2 | 15,696 | Sturrock (2), Kirkwood, Milne, Bannon |
| 19 September 1981 | Airdrieonians | A | 1–2 | 2,687 | Payne |
| 3 October 1981 | Hibernian | A | 1–1 | 5,384 | Dodds |
| 10 October 1981 | Partick Thistle | H | 0–0 | 5,017 | |
| 17 October 1981 | Celtic | A | 1–1 | 22,635 | Milne |
| 24 October 1981 | St Mirren | H | 0–2 | 6,364 | |
| 31 October 1981 | Aberdeen | A | 1–1 | 11,035 | Milne (2) |
| 7 November 1981 | Greenock Morton | H | 3–0 | 6,264 | Dodds (2), Kirkwood |
| 11 November 1981 | Rangers | H | 2–0 | 16,138 | Sturrock, Bannon |
| 14 November 1981 | Dundee | A | 3–1 | 15,578 | Sturrock (2), Milne |
| 21 November 1981 | Airdrieonians | H | 4–0 | 6,157 | Sturrock (2), Dodds, Bannon (penalty) |
| 5 December 1981 | Hibernian | H | 1–0 | 7,257 | Bannon (penalty) |
| 16 January 1982 | Rangers | A | 0–2 | 15,743 | |
| 3 February 1982 | St Mirren | A | 0–1 | 5,198 | |
| 6 February 1982 | Hibernian | A | 1–0 | 6,133 | Bannon (penalty) |
| 9 February 1982 | Airdrieonians | A | 0–2 | 1,737 | |
| 20 February 1982 | Rangers | H | 1–1 | 12,965 | Sturrock |
| 27 February 1982 | St Mirren | H | 1–1 | 7,663 | Bannon (penalty) |
| 10 March 1982 | Dundee | H | 1–1 | 13,790 | McKimmie |
| 13 March 1982 | Partick Thistle | H | 5–1 | 5,465 | Dodds (3), McKinnon, Gough |
| 20 March 1982 | Aberdeen | A | 1–2 | 12,056 | Dodds |
| 27 March 1982 | Greenock Morton | H | 5–0 | 5,333 | Dodds (3), |
| 31 March 1982 | Celtic | H | 0–2 | 15,173 | |
| 3 April 1982 | Dundee | A | 2–0 | 12,602 | Bannon, Sturrock |
| 7 April 1982 | Greenock Morton | A | 1–1 | 1,792 | Milne |
| 10 April 1982 | Airdrieonians | H | 4–0 | 5,416 | Bannon (2), Dodds, Milne |
| 14 April 1982 | Partick Thistle | A | 3–2 | 2,997 | Dodds (3) |
| 17 April 1982 | Hibernian | H | 0–1 | 6,845 | |
| 21 April 1982 | Celtic | A | 1–3 | 14,392 | Dodds |
| 24 April 1982 | Rangers | A | 1–1 | 9,415 | Bannon (penalty) |
| 1 May 1982 | St Mirren | A | 2–2 | 3,404 | Bannon (penalty), Dodds |
| 5 May 1982 | Aberdeen | H | 1–2 | 6,587 | Hegarty |
| 8 May 1982 | Celtic | H | 3–0 | 16,761 | Hegarty, Sturrock, Milne |
| 15 May 1982 | Partick Thistle | A | 2–1 | 2,680 | Sturrock, Reilly |

=== Scottish Cup ===
| Date | Rd | Opponent | Venue | Result | Attendance | Scorers |
|---|---|---|---|---|---|---|
| 30 January 1982 | R3 | Brechin City | A | 4–2 | 4,348 | Sturrock (2), Dodds, Kirkwood |
| 13 February 1982 | R4 | Hibernian | H | 1–1 | 10,735 | Holt |
| 17 February 1982 | R4 R | Hibernian | A | 1–1 | 11,039 | Kirkwood |
| 22 February 1982 | R4 2R | Hibernian | A | 3–0 | 13,759 | Holt, Dodds, Bannon (penalty) |
| 6 March 1982 | QF | St Mirren | A | 0–1 | 9,245 | |

=== League Cup ===
| Date | Rd | Opponent | Venue | Result | Attendance | Scorers |
|---|---|---|---|---|---|---|
| 8 August 1981 | R2 | Ayr United | A | 4–3 | 3,341 | Bannon (3), Sturrock |
| 12 August 1981 | R2 | Partick Thistle | H | 2–0 | 5,926 | Pettigrew, Sturrock |
| 15 August 1981 | G1 | Motherwell | A | 2–1 | 2,884 | Pettigrew, Gough |
| 19 August 1981 | G1 | Partick Thistle | A | 2–1 | 1,805 | Sturrock, Bannon |
| 22 August 1981 | G1 | Ayr United | H | 2–1 | 5,847 | Holt, Fleeting |
| 26 August 1981 | G1 | Motherwell | H | 1–1 | 4,484 | Pettigrew |
| 2 September 1981 | QF 1 | Hamilton Academical | A | 4–0 | 5,381 | Dodds (2), Bannon, Holt |
| 23 September 1981 | QF 2 | Hamilton Academical | H | 5–0 | 3,512 | Payne, Dodds, Sturrock, Reilly, Kirkwood |
| 7 October 1981 | SF 1 | Aberdeen | H | 0–1 | 13,824 | |
| 28 October 1981 | SF 2 | Aberdeen | A | 3–0 | 20,137 | Sturrock (2), Milne |
| 28 November 1981 | F | Rangers | N | 1–2 | 53,795 | Milne |

=== UEFA Cup ===
| Date | Rd | Opponent | Venue | Result | Attendance | Scorers |
|---|---|---|---|---|---|---|
| 16 September 1981 | R1 1 | (France) AS Monaco | A | 5–2 | 7,609 | Dodds (2), Bannon (2), Kirkwood |
| 30 September 1981 | R1 2 | (France) AS Monaco | H | 1–2 | 12,013 | Milne |
| 20 October 1981 | R2 1 | (West Germany) Borussia Mönchengladbach | A | 0–2 | 31,000 | |
| 3 November 1981 | R2 2 | (West Germany) Borussia Mönchengladbach | H | 5–0 | 15,330 | Milne, Kirkwood, Sturrock, Hegarty, Bannon |
| 25 November 1981 | R3 1 | (Belgium) FC Winterslag | A | 0–0 | 9,500 | |
| 9 December 1981 | R3 2 | (Belgium) FC Winterslag | H | 5–0 | 16,232 | Milne (2), Bannon, Narey, Hegarty |
| 3 March 1982 | QF 1 | (Socialist Federal Republic of Yugoslavia) Radnički Niš | H | 2–0 | 16,029 | Narey, Dodds |
| 17 March 1982 | QF 2 | (Socialist Federal Republic of Yugoslavia) Radnički Niš | A | 0–3 | 15,000 | |

== League table ==
| Pos | Team | Pld | W | D | L | GF | GA | GD | Pts | Qualification or relegation |
|---|---|---|---|---|---|---|---|---|---|---|
| 2 | Aberdeen | 36 | 23 | 7 | 6 | 71 | 29 | +42 | 53 | Qualification for the Cup Winners' Cup first round |
| 3 | Rangers | 36 | 16 | 11 | 9 | 57 | 45 | +12 | 43 | Qualification for the UEFA Cup first round |
| 4 | Dundee United | 36 | 15 | 10 | 11 | 61 | 38 | +23 | 40 | Qualification for the UEFA Cup first round |
| 5 | St Mirren | 36 | 14 | 9 | 13 | 49 | 52 | −3 | 37 | |
| 6 | Hibernian | 36 | 11 | 14 | 11 | 38 | 40 | −2 | 36 | |

Source: Statto
Rules for classification: 1) points; 2) goal difference; 3) number of goals scored.

== See also ==
- 1981–82 in Scottish football
