= Derek Stark =

Derek Stark may refer to:

- Derek Stark (footballer) (born 1958), Scottish footballer
- Derek Stark (rugby union) (born 1966), Scottish rugby union player
