= 1984–85 Scottish Cup =

Tournament details
- Country: Scotland

Final positions
- Champions: Celtic
- Runners-up: Dundee United

The 1984–85 Scottish Cup was the 100th staging of Scotland's most prestigious football knockout competition. The Cup was won by Celtic who defeated Dundee United in the final. The first round saw Stirling Albion record a 20–0 win over non-league Selkirk. This was the biggest win in British senior football in the 20th century.

== First round ==
Home team	Score	Away team
Berwick Rangers	3 – 1	Albion Rovers
Dunfermline Athletic	1 – 3	East Stirlingshire
Queen of the South	2 – 1	Arbroath
Stenhousemuir	2 – 1	Whitehill Welfare
Stirling Albion	20 – 0	Selkirk
Stranraer	2 – 2	Gala Fairydean

=== Replay ===
Home team	Score	Away team
Gala Fairydean	0 – 1	Stranraer

== Second round ==
Home team	Score	Away team
Alloa Athletic	2 – 1	East Stirlingshire
Berwick Rangers	1 – 1	Inverness Caledonian
Cowdenbeath	2 – 1	Stirling Albion
Inverness Thistle	1 – 1	Spartans
Keith	2 – 0	Brora Rangers
Queen of the South	3 – 1	Montrose
Queen's Park	0 – 0	Raith Rovers
Stranraer	0 – 0	Stenhousemuir

=== Replays ===
Home team	Score	Away team
Stenhousemuir	0 – 2	Stranraer
Spartans	1 – 2	Inverness Thistle
Raith Rovers	1 – 0	Queen's Park
Inverness Caledonian	3 – 3	Berwick Rangers

==== Second Replay ====
Home team	Score	Away team
Inverness Caledonian	3 – 0	Berwick Rangers

== Third round ==
Home team	Score	Away team
Inverness Thistle	3 – 0	Kilmarnock
Stranraer	4 – 6	Queen of the South
St Johnstone	1 – 1	Dundee
Airdrieonians	0 – 3	Falkirk
Cowdenbeath	0 – 4	St Mirren
Dundee United	3 – 0	Hibernian
Forfar Athletic	1 – 0	Clydebank
Aberdeen	5 – 0	Alloa Athletic
Hamilton Academical	1 – 2	Celtic
Hearts	6 – 0	Inverness Caledonian
Meadowbank Thistle	4 – 2	Partick Thistle
Motherwell	4 – 0	Dumbarton
Ayr United	3 – 1	Keith
Brechin City	1 – 1	East Fife
Greenock Morton	3 – 3	Rangers
Raith Rovers	2 – 2	Clyde

=== Replays ===
Home team	Score	Away team
Dundee	2 – 1	St Johnstone
Clyde	1 – 2	Raith Rovers
Rangers	3 – 1	Greenock Morton
East Fife	0 – 4	Brechin City

== Fourth round ==
Home team	Score	Away team
Meadowbank Thistle	0 – 2	Motherwell
Ayr United	0 – 1	St Mirren
Brechin City	1 – 1	Hearts
Celtic	6 – 0	Inverness Thistle
Forfar Athletic	2 – 1	Falkirk
Queen of the South	0 – 3	Dundee United
Raith Rovers	1 – 2	Aberdeen
Rangers	0 – 1	Dundee

=== Replay ===
Home team	Score	Away team
Hearts	1 – 0	Brechin City

== Quarter-finals ==
Home team	Score	Away team
Dundee	1 – 1	Celtic
Hearts	1 – 1	Aberdeen
Motherwell	4 – 1	Forfar Athletic
St Mirren	1 – 4	Dundee United

=== Replays ===
Home team	Score	Away team
Aberdeen	1 – 0	Hearts
Celtic	2 – 1	Dundee

== Semi-finals ==
13 April 1985

Aberdeen	0–0	Dundee United

Tynecastle Stadium, Edinburgh
Attendance: 18,485
Referee: Hugh Alexander

13 April 1985

Celtic	1–1	Motherwell
Tommy Burns 22'		Gary McAllister 13'

Hampden Park, Glasgow
Attendance: 30,536

=== Replays ===
17 April 1985

Aberdeen	1–2	Dundee United
Angus 86'		Paul Sturrock 5'; Stuart Beedie 59'

Tynecastle Stadium, Edinburgh
Attendance: 10,771
Referee: Hugh Alexander

17 April 1985

Celtic	3–0	Motherwell
Roy Aitken 73'; Mo Johnston 82', 90'

Hampden Park, Glasgow
Attendance: 25,677

== Final ==
18 May 1985

Celtic	2–1	Dundee United
Provan 77'; McGarvey 84'		Beedie 55'

Hampden Park, Glasgow
Attendance: 60,346
Referee: Brian McGinlay

== See also ==
- 1984–85 in Scottish football
- 1984–85 Scottish League Cup
