= Jack Court =

Welsh footballer

Personal information
- Full name: Harold John Court
- Date of birth: 13 June 1919
- Place of birth: Tir-Phil, Wales
- Date of death: 29 June 1975 (aged 56)
- Place of death: Rochester, England
- Position: Inside forward

Youth career
- Llanbradach

Senior career*
| Years | Team | Apps | (Gls) |
| –1938 | Llanbradach | | |
| 1938–1947 | Cardiff City | 1 | (0) |
| 1948 | Dundee United | 6 | (1) |
| 1948–1950 | Dundee | 2 | (0) |
| 1949 | → Dumbarton (loan) | | |
| 1950–1951 | Swindon Town | 16 | (2) |
| 1951 | Weymouth | | |
| 1951–1952 | Dover Athletic | | |
| 1952–1953 | Margate | | |
| 1953 | Chatham Town | | |
| 1953– | Sittingbourne | | |
- * Club domestic league appearances and goals

Harold John Court, commonly known as Jack Court (13 June 1919 – 29 June 1975) was a Welsh professional footballer who played as an inside forward.

Court began his career in the late 1930s with Cardiff City, making his debut in a 1–0 victory over Crystal Palace on 25 March 1939, but the imminent onset of the Second World War interrupted his career. When league football resumed, Court rejoined Cardiff for the 1946–47 season but was unable to break into the first-team. He later played for Scottish rivals Dundee United and Dundee. Court moved to Swindon Town in 1950 before playing out his career in the lower English leagues. Court died in 1975.
