= Walter Carlyle =

Scottish footballer (1938–2007)

Personal information
- Date of birth: 23 May 1938
- Place of birth: Grangemouth, Scotland
- Date of death: 31 December 2007 (aged 69)
- Height: 1.80 m (5 ft 11 in)
- Position: Right winger

Youth career
- Kilsyth Rangers

Senior career*
| Years | Team | Apps | (Gls) |
| 1958–1959 | Rangers | 0 | (0) |
| 1959–1960 | Shettleston | | |
| 1960–1964 | Dundee United | 78 | (39) |
| 1964–1965 | Motherwell | 25 | (7) |
| 1965 | St Johnstone | 1 | (0) |
| 1966 | Queen of the South | 5 | (6) |
| 1966–1967 | East Stirlingshire | 25 | (7) |
| 1968–1969 | Alloa Athletic | 3 | (2) |
- * Club domestic league appearances and goals

Walter Carlyle (23 May 1938 – 31 December 2007) was a Scottish footballer who played as a right winger. He began his career in the late 1950s with Rangers but left without playing a first team match and moved to Junior side Shettleston. In 1960, Carlyle moved back to the senior game's top level with newly promoted Dundee United, netting 39 goals in 78 league appearances during his time at Tannadice. In 1964, Carlyle moved to Motherwell, where he stayed for around a year, before playing for St Johnstone and then the Queen of the South side of Allan Ball, Iain McChesney and Billy Collings. Carlyle ended his playing career with spells at East Stirlingshire and Alloa Athletic. He retired at the end of the 1960s.

Carlyle died in 2007.
