= Joe Ward (footballer, born 1954) =

Scottish footballer

Personal information
- Full name: Joseph Ward
- Date of birth: 25 November 1954 (age 71)
- Place of birth: Glasgow, Scotland
- Height: 6 ft 0 in (1.83 m)
- Position: Striker

Senior career*
Years	Team	Apps	(Gls)
1974–1979	Clyde	128	(39)
1979	Aston Villa	3	(0)
1979	Hibernian	9	(0)
1980–1981	Dundee United	6	(0)
1981–1984	Ayr United	39	(3)
1984–1985	Stirling Albion	8	(1)
1985–1987	St Johnstone	39	(8)
Total		232	(51)
- * Club domestic league appearances and goals

Joe Ward (born 25 November 1954) is a Scottish former footballer who played as a forward.

== Career ==
Ward started his career with Clyde before winning a move to English side Aston Villa in the late 1970s. Ward played three games for the Villans, returning to Scotland with Hibernian where he played a further nine times before joining Dundee United. Ward's time at Tannadice was equally short as he played only six times before moving to Ayr United. After nearly forty appearances with the Honest Men, Ward moved on to Stirling Albion, before playing out his career with St Johnstone.
