= Arthur Cram =

Scottish football administrator (1894–1958)

Personal information
- Date of birth: 1894
- Place of birth: Scotland
- Date of death: 1958 (aged 63–64)

Arthur S Cram (1894–1958) was a Scottish football administrator.

== Career ==
Arthur Cram was a partner in the accounting firm James Cram & Sons in Dundee had an accounting business in Dundee He was the Dundee United club secretary from 1938 to 1945. He also served as a councillor in Newport-on-Tay during the same period.

During World War Two he was too old to join the active forces (he had been injured in World War One), so he became the club secretary, a position that he held until 1945. He attempted to resign as secretary in June 1940 but was convinced to withdraw his resignation. He was not, as is sometimes erroneously reported, manager of the club during the war.

His administrative abilities were particularly useful in identifying and securing the release of pre-war professional players who were stationed with the armed forces within travelling distance of Dundee. At a time when several clubs - including Dundee FC - closed down rather than put in the effort that Cram did on United's behalf, the club and its supporters owed him a considerable debt for keeping the flag flying at Tannadice Park from 1941 to 1945. At the end of the conflict he relinquished his position and was invited to join the board, where he remained until 1951.
