= David Sturrock =

Scottish footballer (1938–2022)

Personal information
- Full name: David Sturrock
- Date of birth: 22 February 1938
- Place of birth: Dundee, Scotland
- Date of death: 2022
- Position: Inside forward

Senior career*
Years	Team	Apps	(Gls)
1955?–1960?	Dundee United	83	(20)
1960?–1961?	Accrington Stanley	17	(5)
1961?–	Bedford Town		
- * Club domestic league appearances and goals

David Sturrock (22 February 1938 – 2022) was a Scottish footballer, who played as an inside forward in the Scottish Football League and the English Football League in the 1950s and 1960s.

Sturrock began a five-year spell with local club Dundee United in the mid-1950s, joining English side Accrington Stanley for the 1960/61 season. He is reported as having made a total of 26 appearances for Accrington (scoring 7 goals), before moving to Southern League side Bedford Town. Sturrock moved back to his hometown of Dundee following the end of his playing career.

Dundee United announced in December 2022 that Sturrock had recently died.
