= Jimmy Briggs (footballer) =

Scottish footballer

Personal information
- Full name: James Briggs
- Date of birth: 8 April 1937
- Place of birth: Dundee, Scotland
- Date of death: 9 April 2011 (aged 74)
- Place of death: Dundee, Scotland
- Position: Full back

Youth career
- 1953–1955: St Mary's Youth Club

Senior career*
Years	Team	Apps	(Gls)
1955–1970	Dundee United	334	(31)
1967	→ Dallas Tornado (loan)	5	(0)
1970–1971	Montrose	6	(0)
1971–1974	Keith		
- * Club domestic league appearances and goals

James Briggs (8 April 1937 – 9 April 2011) was a Scottish professional footballer who played as a full back. Briggs played the majority of his career with Dundee United, making nearly 400 appearances and captaining the side when they defeated Barcelona in their first European campaign in the 1960s. He then briefly played for Montrose, followed by three seasons in the Highland Football League with Keith F.C.

Briggs was named in 2008 as one of the inaugural inductees to the Dundee United Hall of Fame. He died on 9 April 2011.
