= 1983–84 Scottish Cup =

Tournament details
- Country: Scotland

Final positions
- Champions: Aberdeen
- Runners-up: Celtic

Tournament statistics
- Goals scored: Brian McClair (6)

The 1983–84 Scottish Cup was the 99th staging of Scotland's most prestigious football knockout competition. The Cup was won by Aberdeen for the third year running, after defeating Celtic in the final.

== First round ==
| Home team | Score | Away team |
|---|---|---|
| Cowdenbeath (3) | 3 – 1 | Vale of Leithen (NL) |
| Dalbeattie Star (NL) | 1 – 5 | Arbroath (3) |
| East Stirlingshire(3) | 1 – 0 | Stenhousemuir (3) |
| Elgin City (NL) | 0 – 2 | Queen's Park (3) |
| Forfar Athletic (3) | 4 – 1 | Spartans (NL) |
| Inverness Caledonian (NL) | 2 – 1 | Albion Rovers (3) |

== Second round ==
| Home team | Score | Away team |
|---|---|---|
| Dunfermline Athletic (3) | 1 – 0 | Forfar Athletic (3) |
| Arbroath (3) | 0 – 0 | Stirling Albion (3) |
| Cowdenbeath (3) | 2 – 1 | Montrose (3) |
| East Stirlingshire (3) | 3 – 1 | Fraserburgh (NL) |
| Gala Fairydean (NL) | 0 – 2 | Inverness Caledonian (NL) |
| Peterhead (NL) | 1 – 2 | Berwick Rangers (3) |
| Queen of the South (3) | 0 – 5 | East Fife (3) |
| Stranraer (3) | 1 – 2 | Queen's Park (3) |

=== Replay ===
| Home team | Score | Away team |
|---|---|---|
| Stirling Albion (3) | 0 – 0 | Arbroath (3) |

==== Second replay ====
| Home team | Score | Away team |
|---|---|---|
| Arbroath (3) | 1 – 2 | Stirling Albion (3) |

== Third round ==
| Home team | Score | Away team |
|---|---|---|
| Aberdeen (1) | 1 – 1 | Kilmarnock (2) |
| Airdrieonians (2) | 1 – 0 | St Johnstone (1) |
| Inverness Caledonian (NL) | 0 – 0 | Stirling Albion (3) |
| Clydebank (2) | 0 – 0 | Brechin City (2) |
| Cowdenbeath (3) | 0 – 2 | Dundee (1) |
| Dundee United (1) | 1 – 0 | Ayr United (2) |
| Falkirk (2) | 1 – 2 | Clyde (2) |
| Hearts (1) | 2 – 0 | Partick Thistle (2) |
| Greenock Morton (2) | 2 – 0 | East Stirlingshire (3) |
| Motherwell (1) | 3 – 0 | Queen's Park (3) |
| Raith Rovers (2) | 1 – 4 | Dumbarton (2) |
| Hamilton Academical (2) | 3 – 1 | Alloa Athletic (2) |
| Berwick Rangers (3) | 0 – 4 | Celtic (1) |
| Hibernian (1) | 0 – 0 | East Fife (3) |
| Meadowbank Thistle (2) | 0 – 0 | St Mirren (1) |
| Rangers (1) | 2 – 1 | Dunfermline Athletic (3) |

=== Replays ===
| Home team | Score | Away team |
|---|---|---|
| Kilmarnock (2) | 1 – 3 | Aberdeen (1) |
| Stirling Albion (3) | 1 – 2 | Inverness Caledonian (NL) |
| Brechin City (2) | 0 – 3 | Clydebank (2) |
| St Mirren (1) | 2 – 2 | Meadowbank Thistle (2) |
| East Fife (3) | 2 – 0 | Hibernian (1) |

==== Second replay ====
| Home team | Score | Away team |
|---|---|---|
| Meadowbank Thistle (2) | 1 – 2 | St Mirren (1) |

== Fourth round ==
| Home team | Score | Away team |
|---|---|---|
| Dundee (1) | 2 – 1 | Airdrieonians (2) |
| Clyde (2) | 0 – 2 | Aberdeen (1) |
| Dundee United (1) | 2 – 1 | Hearts (1) |
| East Fife (3) | 0 – 6 | Celtic (1) |
| Inverness Caledonian (NL) | 0 – 6 | Rangers (1) |
| Greenock Morton (2) | 2 – 1 | Dumbarton (2) |
| Motherwell (1) | 3 – 1 | Clydebank (2) |
| St Mirren (1) | 2 – 1 | Hamilton Academical (2) |

== Quarter-finals ==
| Home team | Score | Away team |
|---|---|---|
| Aberdeen (1) | 0 – 0 | Dundee United (1) |
| Motherwell (1) | 0 – 6 | Celtic (1) |
| Dundee (1) | 2 – 2 | Rangers (1) |
| St Mirren (1) | 4 – 3 | Greenock Morton (2) |

=== Replays ===
| Home team | Score | Away team |
|---|---|---|
| Dundee United (1) | 0 – 1 | Aberdeen (1) |
| Rangers (1) | 2 – 3 | Dundee (1) |

== Semi-finals ==
14 April 1984

| Aberdeen (1) | 2–0 | Dundee (1) |
|---|---|---|
| Ian Porteous 28'; Gordon Strachan 89' |

Tynecastle Stadium, Edinburgh
Attendance: 17,645
Referee: Brian McGinlay

14 April 1984

| Celtic (1) | 2–1 | St Mirren (1) |
|---|---|---|
| Brian McClair 29'; Paul McStay 81' | | Frank McDougall 38' |

Hampden Park, Glasgow
Attendance: 24,690

== Final ==
19 May 1984

| Aberdeen (1) | 2–1 (a.e.t.) | Celtic (1) |
|---|---|---|
| Black 23'; McGhee 98' | | McStay 86' |

Hampden Park, Glasgow
Attendance: 58,900
Referee: Bob Valentine

== See also ==
- 1983–84 in Scottish football
- 1983–84 Scottish League Cup
