= Derek Addison =

Scottish footballer

Personal information
- Date of birth: 8 July 1955 (age 71)
- Place of birth: Dundee, Scotland
- Position: Midfielder

Youth career
- 1971–1972: Hibernian
- 1972–1973: Lochee United

Senior career*
Years	Team	Apps	(Gls)
1973–1981	Dundee United	106	(9)
1981–1982	Heart of Midlothian	32	(4)
1982–1986	St Johnstone	98	(3)
1986–1987	Brechin City	1	(0)
Total		237	(16)
- * Club domestic league appearances and goals

Derek Addison (born 8 July 1955 in Dundee) is a Scottish former footballer who played as a midfielder.

A former pupil of Harris Academy, Addison was briefly attached to Hibernian aged 16 before returning to his native Tayside. After a season playing with Junior side Lochee United he signed for Jim McLean's Dundee United. Considered part of the club's move towards home-grown players, he broke into the first team at the same time as John Holt and Ray Stewart and Billy Kirkwood. However, he was unable to establish himself as a regular in the side: in his eight seasons at Tannadice he only once made more than twenty league starts.

Addison signed for recently relegated Hearts in September 1981, along with former international striker Willie Pettigrew, in a deal worth almost £200,000. Although he enjoyed a prominent first team role for the first time, the size of his transfer fee coupled with a failure to gain instant promotion had led to financial problems at Hearts, necessitating his sale after only one season. Fellow First Division side St Johnstone paid £65,000 for his services in 1982 and he made 113 competitive appearances for the Perth side in 4 seasons. He attained a player-coach role with the Saints in 1985 but left the club a year later.
