= Jim Irvine (footballer) =

Scottish footballer (1940–2026)

Personal information
- Full name: James Irvine
- Date of birth: 17 August 1940
- Place of birth: Whitburn, Scotland
- Date of death: May 2026 (aged 85)
- Position: Forward

Youth career
- Edinburgh Athletic
- Whitburn Juniors

Senior career*
Years	Team	Apps	(Gls)
1959–1964	Dundee United	125	(62)
1964–1967	Middlesbrough	91	(37)
1967–1970	Heart of Midlothian	34	(11)
1970–1972	Barrow	67	(17)
Total		317	(127)
- * Club domestic league appearances and goals

James Irvine (17 August 1940 – May 2026) was a Scottish professional footballer who played as a forward. He appeared in the Scottish Football League for Dundee United and Heart of Midlothian and for Middlesbrough and Barrow in The Football League.

== Career ==
=== Early years and Dundee United ===
Irvine was raised in West Lothian, where he attended St Mary's School in Bathgate. He showed early footballing promise and was capped by Scotland at Schoolboy level. After playing junior football for Whitburn Juniors, he started his senior football career with Dundee United, then in the Second Division, initially on a part-time basis as he completed a motor mechanic apprenticeship.

In 1959 United manager Andy McCall (their fifth in less than five years), resigned after leading the part-time club to third bottom place in Division Two. Jerry Kerr was given the task of reviving the club in April that year. Kerr gave Irvine his chance as well as Dennis Gillespie who Kerr brought from Alloa Athletic.

Kerr's first policy upon joining United was his insistence that his players be full-time, a gamble that could have cost the club dearly. He also insisted that there had to be a properly constituted reserve side and an end to the previous policy of buying in over-the-hill First Division players. Yeats' career took an upward turn from Kerr's appointment. Kerr regarded Yeats as so vital to the fortunes of the team he sought his release to play each Saturday from the military authorities while Yeats served his National Service. In Kerr's 1959–60 first full season in charge, St Johnstone finished as champions. United's challengers for the second promotion spot were Hamilton Academical and Queen of the South. Hamilton were beaten 5–1 at Tannadice with seven games to go before a crowd of over 11,000 putting Accies firmly in United's rear view. United went to Palmerston Park to play the Ivor Broadis inspired Queen of the South with three games to go. United returned home with a 4–4 draw to maintain their one-point advantage over QoS. Promotion was clinched with a last game of the season 1–0 home win against Berwick Rangers before a crowd of near 17,000. This brought First Division football to Tannadice for the first time since they had been relegated in 1932.

In the following 1960–61 season United retained their top division place. Other players to flourish like defensive giant Ron Yeats were the forward pair Gillespie and Irvine scoring 21 and 23 goals respectively. United finished a creditable ninth. Irvine's striking partnership with Gillespie provided more than 150 goals as they consolidated a position in the Scottish top flight over the following seasons. In 1961 his goalscoring attracted the attention of Bill Shankly who was desperate to sign a striker but injury at a crucial time put paid to any transfer and Shankly instead bought Ian St John from Motherwell.

=== Middlesbrough ===
At the end of the 1963–64 season, Middlesbrough manager Raich Carter bid £25,000 for Irvine's services and he moved to Teesside. Boro were a mid-table Division Two at the time but despite Irvine becoming a regular goalscorer, they slumped to relegation in 1965–66. An instant return to Division Two was secured the following season, although QPR won the league title.

A bust-up with then manager Stan Anderson over him being rushed back too soon after injury (including an appearance in a specially arranged friendly for Irvine's benefit against Brian Clough's Hartlepool United at Hutton Road, Middlesbrough's training ground) led Irvine to return to Scotland in 1967.

=== Heart of Midlothian ===
Irvine joined John Harvey's Heart of Midlothian for £10,000. A coachload of Middlesbrough FC Jim Irvine fans went to Hearts to see his debut for the Edinburgh side. He appeared in his first major final in his first season with the Maroons, after playing in every match en route to the 1968 Scottish Cup final. However, George Farm's Dunfermline proved too strong in the Hampden showpiece, winning 3–1. His following two seasons were decimated by a series of injuries and he was released in 1970.

=== Barrow ===
Irvine joined Division Four club Barrow but left senior football when they were voted out of the Football League in 1972. Irvine was reinstated to Scottish junior football in 1973, signing for West Lothian club New Blackburn Athletic.

== Later life ==
After his playing retirement Irvine returned to Bathgate, where he found work as a spray-painter. His son Alan Irvine played professionally for many clubs including Falkirk, Liverpool, Dundee United, Shrewsbury Town and St Mirren in the 1980s and 90s.

== Death ==
On 18 May 2026, it was announced Irvine had died aged 85.
