= 1983–84 Scottish Premier Division =

78th season of top-tier football league in Scotland

Scottish Premier Division
- Season: 1983–84
- Champions: Aberdeen; 2nd Premier Division title 3rd Scottish title
- Relegated: St Johnstone; Motherwell
- European Cup: Aberdeen
- UEFA Cup: Dundee United; Rangers; Heart of Midlothian
- Cup Winners' Cup: Celtic
- Matches: 180
- Goals: 533 (2.96 per match)
- Top goalscorer: Brian McClair (23)
- Biggest home win: Dundee United 7–0 St Johnstone
- Biggest away win: St Johnstone 0–5 Aberdeen

The 1983–84 Scottish Premier Division season was won by Aberdeen, seven points ahead of Celtic. St Johnstone and Motherwell were relegated.

== Table ==
| Pos | Team | Pld | W | D | L | GF | GA | GD | Pts | Qualification or relegation |
|---|---|---|---|---|---|---|---|---|---|---|
| 1 | Aberdeen (C) | 36 | 25 | 7 | 4 | 78 | 21 | +57 | 57 | Qualification for the European Cup first round |
| 2 | Celtic | 36 | 21 | 8 | 7 | 80 | 41 | +39 | 50 | Qualification for the Cup Winners' Cup first round |
| 3 | Dundee United | 36 | 18 | 11 | 7 | 67 | 39 | +28 | 47 | Qualification for the UEFA Cup first round |
| 4 | Rangers | 36 | 15 | 12 | 9 | 53 | 41 | +12 | 42 | Qualification for the UEFA Cup first round |
| 5 | Heart of Midlothian | 36 | 10 | 16 | 10 | 38 | 47 | −9 | 36 | Qualification for the UEFA Cup first round |
| 6 | St Mirren | 36 | 9 | 14 | 13 | 55 | 59 | −4 | 32 | |
| 7 | Hibernian | 36 | 12 | 7 | 17 | 45 | 55 | −10 | 31 | |
| 8 | Dundee | 36 | 11 | 5 | 20 | 50 | 74 | −24 | 27 | |
| 9 | St Johnstone (R) | 36 | 10 | 3 | 23 | 36 | 81 | −45 | 23 | Relegation to the 1984–85 Scottish First Division |
| 10 | Motherwell (R) | 36 | 4 | 7 | 25 | 31 | 75 | −44 | 15 | Relegation to the 1984–85 Scottish First Division |

Source: Statto
Rules for classification: 1) points; 2) goal difference; 3) number of goals scored.
(C) Champions; (R) Relegated

== Results ==
=== Matches 1–18 ===
During matches 1–18 each team plays every other team twice (home and away).

| Home \ Away | ABE | CEL | DND | DNU | HOM | HIB | MOT | RAN | STJ | STM |
|---|---|---|---|---|---|---|---|---|---|---|
| Aberdeen | | 3–1 | 3–0 | 1–2 | 2–0 | 2–1 | 3–1 | 3–0 | 5–0 | 5–0 |
| Celtic | 0–0 | | 1–0 | 1–1 | 1–1 | 5–1 | 4–0 | 2–1 | 5–2 | 1–1 |
| Dundee | 1–3 | 2–6 | | 1–4 | 1–2 | 0–3 | 2–0 | 3–2 | 0–1 | 2–2 |
| Dundee United | 0–2 | 2–1 | 0–1 | | 1–0 | 5–0 | 4–0 | 0–2 | 7–0 | 2–0 |
| Heart of Midlothian | 0–2 | 1–3 | 1–3 | 0–0 | | 3–2 | 0–0 | 3–1 | 2–0 | 2–2 |
| Hibernian | 2–1 | 0–2 | 2–1 | 0–2 | 1–1 | | 2–1 | 0–2 | 4–1 | 3–1 |
| Motherwell | 1–1 | 0–3 | 1–3 | 2–2 | 1–1 | 1–2 | | 0–3 | 0–1 | 0–0 |
| Rangers | 0–2 | 1–2 | 2–1 | 0–0 | 3–0 | 1–0 | 1–2 | | 6–3 | 1–1 |
| St Johnstone | 0–5 | 0–3 | 0–2 | 1–2 | 0–1 | 0–3 | 3–1 | 0–1 | | 3–2 |
| St Mirren | 0–3 | 4–2 | 0–0 | 4–0 | 0–1 | 2–1 | 1–1 | 3–0 | 1–2 | |

Legend: Blue = home team win; Yellow = draw; Red = away team win.

=== Matches 19–36 ===
During matches 19–36 each team plays every other team twice (home and away).

| Home \ Away | ABE | CEL | DND | DNU | HOM | HIB | MOT | RAN | STJ | STM |
|---|---|---|---|---|---|---|---|---|---|---|
| Aberdeen | | 1–0 | 5–2 | 5–1 | 1–1 | 2–2 | 2–1 | 0–0 | 1–0 | 2–0 |
| Celtic | 1–0 | | 3–0 | 1–1 | 4–1 | 3–2 | 4–2 | 3–0 | 5–2 | 2–0 |
| Dundee | 0–1 | 3–2 | | 2–5 | 4–1 | 1–2 | 1–0 | 1–3 | 2–0 | 2–5 |
| Dundee United | 0–0 | 3–1 | 1–1 | | 3–1 | 2–0 | 2–1 | 1–2 | 3–0 | 2–2 |
| Heart of Midlothian | 0–1 | 1–1 | 1–1 | 0–0 | | 1–1 | 2–1 | 2–2 | 2–2 | 2–1 |
| Hibernian | 0–2 | 0–1 | 3–1 | 1–0 | 0–0 | | 1–2 | 0–0 | 1–2 | 1–1 |
| Motherwell | 0–4 | 2–2 | 2–4 | 1–3 | 0–1 | 2–3 | | 0–3 | 1–0 | 1–0 |
| Rangers | 1–1 | 1–0 | 2–2 | 2–2 | 0–0 | 0–0 | 2–1 | | 2–0 | 1–1 |
| St Johnstone | 0–2 | 0–0 | 1–0 | 1–2 | 1–2 | 1–0 | 3–1 | 1–4 | | 4–2 |
| St Mirren | 3–2 | 2–4 | 4–0 | 2–2 | 1–1 | 3–1 | 2–1 | 1–1 | 1–1 | |

Legend: Blue = home team win; Yellow = draw; Red = away team win.

== Awards ==
| Award | Winner | Club |
|---|---|---|
| PFA Players' Player of the Year | (Scotland) Willie Miller | Aberdeen |
| PFA Young Player of the Year | (Scotland) John Robertson | Heart of Midlothian |
| SFWA Footballer of the Year | (Scotland) Willie Miller | Aberdeen |
