= Dennis Gillespie =

Scottish footballer (1936–2001)

Personal information
- Date of birth: 8 January 1936
- Place of birth: Duntocher, Scotland
- Date of death: 5 June 2001 (aged 65)
- Height: 6 ft 0 in (1.83 m)
- Position: Forward

Youth career
- Clydebank Juveniles
- Duntocher Hibernian

Senior career*
Years	Team	Apps	(Gls)
1957–1959	Alloa Athletic	56	(40)
1959–1971	Dundee United	376	(106)
1967	→ Dallas Tornado (loan)	10	(1)
1972–1976	Brechin City	88	(0)
Total		530	(147)

International career
1961	Scottish League XI	1	(0)
- * Club domestic league appearances and goals

Dennis Gillespie (8 January 1936 – 5 June 2001) was a Scottish professional footballer who played as a forward for Alloa Athletic, Dundee United, Dallas Tornado and Brechin City. He played for Jerry Kerr at Gillespie's first two clubs. He remains one of the Dundee United's all-time top goalscorers.

== Alloa Athletic ==
Gillespie's breakthrough in senior football was with Alloa who he joined from Duntocher Hibs. Under Jerry Kerr's management he was paired in an effective inside forward combination with John White.

== Dundee United and Dallas Tornado ==
In 1959 United manager Andy McCall (their fifth in less than five years), resigned after leading the part-time club to third bottom place in Division Two. Jerry Kerr was the man given the task of reviving the club in April that year.

Kerr's first policy upon joining United was his insistence that his players be full-time, a gamble that could have cost the club dearly. He also insisted that there had to be a properly constituted reserve side and an end to the previous policy of buying in over-the-hill First Division players. Ron Yeats' career took an upward turn from Kerr's appointment. Kerr regarded Yeats as so vital to the fortunes of the team he sought his release to play each Saturday from the military authorities while Yeats served his National Service. In Kerr's 1959–60 first full season in charge, St Johnstone finished as champions. United's challengers for the second promotion spot were Hamilton Academical and Queen of the South. Hamilton were beaten 5–1 at Tannadice with seven games to go before a crowd of over 11,000 putting Accies firmly in United's rear view. United went to Palmerston Park to play the Ivor Broadis inspired Queen of the South with three games to go. United returned home with a 4–4 draw to maintain their one-point advantage over QoS. Promotion was clinched with a last game of the season 1–0 home win against Berwick Rangers before a crowd of near 17,000. This brought First Division football to Tannadice for the first time since they had been relegated in 1932.

In the following 1960–61 season United retained their top division place. Other players to flourish like defensive giant Ron Yeats were the forward pair of Gillespie and Jim Irvine scoring 21 and 23 goals respectively. United finished a creditable ninth.

Gillespie spent over a decade at Tannadice. The highlight was the home and away double victory against F.C. Barcelona in 1966–67 Inter-Cities Fairs Cup. The 2–1 first leg victory at Camp Nou was the first ever competitive victory in Spain by a British club.

When at Tannadice he had a spell on when United played in the North American league as Dallas Tornado.

== Brechin City ==
Gillespie ended his senior career with Brechin.
