= Tom Flood (footballer) =

Scottish footballer

Personal information
- Full name: Thomas Flood
- Place of birth: Scotland
- Position: Outside forward

Senior career*
Years	Team	Apps	(Gls)
- Dundee
1909–1910	Dundee Hibernian		
1914–1918	Dundee Hibernian		
- * Club domestic league appearances and goals

Thomas Flood was a Scottish professional footballer who played as an outside forward. Flood signed for Dundee Hibernian from rivals Dundee and featured briefly in Hibs' inaugural season in the Northern League before being released at the end of the season. Flood returned to Tannadice Park in October 1914 and although his remaining appearances for the club were in the latter part of that year, he remained a signed player throughout the First World War, leaving in May 1919. Making only eight first team league appearances during his two spells with Hibs, it is unknown where Flood went after leaving for the second time.
