= Stuart Beedie =

Scottish footballer (born 1960)

Personal information
- Date of birth: 16 August 1960 (age 66)
- Place of birth: Aberdeen, Scotland
- Position: Midfielder

Team information
- Current team: Port Kembla FC (coach)

Senior career*
Years	Team	Apps	(Gls)
1978–1981	Montrose	80	(13)
1981–1984	St Johnstone	95	(9)
1984–1986	Dundee United	44	(6)
1986–1987	Hibernian	9	(2)
1987–1989	Dunfermline Athletic	65	(4)
1989–1993	Dundee	84	(7)
1993–1994	East Fife	25	(0)
1994–1995	Montrose	19	(2)
1995	Illawarra Lions		
Total		421	(43)
- * Club domestic league appearances and goals

Stuart Beedie (born 16 August 1960) is a Scottish former football player who played as a midfielder for a number of Scottish clubs, including St Johnstone, Dundee United, Hibernian, Dunfermline and Dundee. Beedie won a Scottish Cup runners-up medal with Dundee United, scoring United's goal in a 2–1 defeat to Celtic in the 1985 Scottish Cup Final.

Beedie was a "very solid" midfielder, who played a significant role in an infamous incident between Hibernian and Rangers at the start of the 1986–87 season. Graeme Souness was making his first appearance in Scottish football as player-manager of Rangers in a match at Easter Road, but he was sent off for an "assault" on Hibs player George McCluskey. That incident had been sparked by Beedie making a strong challenge on Souness. Beedie also scored a goal in that match, in which Hibs secured a famous 2–1 win.

After retiring from playing in 1995, Beedie moved to Australia, where he was assistant manager at Wollongong Wolves. Beedie remained in the country and managed Illawarra sides Dapto, Cringila FC and won a grand final with Port Kembla FC.

== Honours ==
- Scottish Cup Runner-up: 1

1984–85
