= 1983–84 Scottish League Cup =

Tournament details
- Country: Scotland

Final positions
- Champions: Rangers
- Runners-up: Celtic

Tournament statistics
- Top goal scorer: Ally McCoist (9)

The 1983–84 Scottish League Cup was the 38th season of Scotland's second football knockout competition. The competition was won by Rangers, who defeated Celtic in the Final.

== First round ==
=== First leg ===
Home team	Score	Away team	Date
Albion Rovers (3)	0–4	Queen of the South (3)	13 August 1983
Arbroath (3)	0–1	East Fife (3)	13 August 1983
Berwick Rangers (3)	2–0	Stranraer (3)	13 August 1983
Forfar Athletic (3)	1–0	Stenhousemuir (3)	13 August 1983
Montrose (3)	1–0	East Stirlingshire (3)	13 August 1983
Stirling Albion (3)	1–1	Cowdenbeath (3)	15 August 1983

=== Second leg ===
Home team	Score	Away team	Date	Agg
Cowdenbeath	2–0	Stirling Albion	17 August 1983	3–1
East Fife	1–1	Arbroath	17 August 1983	2–1
East Stirlingshire	1–2	Montrose	17 August 1983	1–3
Queen of the South	2–1	Albion Rovers	17 August 1983	6–1
Stenhousemuir	2–2	Forfar Athletic	17 August 1983	2–3
Stranraer	1–1	Berwick Rangers	17 August 1983	1–3

== Second round ==
=== First leg ===
Home team	Score	Away team	Date
Aberdeen (1)	9–0	Raith Rovers (2)	24 August 1983
Airdrieonians (2)	2–0	Clyde (2)	23 August 1983
Ayr United (2)	1–2	Clydebank (2)	23 August 1983
Brechin City (2)	0–1	Celtic (1)	23 August 1983
Cowdenbeath (3)	1–0	Heart of Midlothian (1)	24 August 1983
Dundee United (1)	6–1	Dunfermline Ath (3)	24 August 1983
East Fife (3)	1–2	St Johnstone (1)	24 August 1983
Falkirk (2)	2–3	Alloa Athletic (2)	24 August 1983
Hamilton Academical (2)	2–1	Morton (2)	24 August 1983
Hibernian (1)	5–0	Dumbarton (2)	24 August 1983
Meadowbank Thistle (2)	2–1	Partick Thistle (2)	24 August 1983
Montrose (2)	1–3	Dundee (1)	23 August 1983
Motherwell (1)	2–0	Berwick Rangers (3)	24 August 1983
Queen's Park (3)	3–2	Kilmarnock (2)	24 August 1983
Rangers (1)	4–0	Queen of the South (3)	24 August 1983
St Mirren (1)	1–0	Forfar Athletic (3)	24 August 1983

=== Second leg ===
Home team	Score	Away team	Date	Agg
Alloa Athletic	2–2	Falkirk	27 August 1983	5–4
Berwick Rangers	0–2	Motherwell	27 August 1983	0–4
Celtic	0–0	Brechin City	27 August 1983	1–0
Clyde	1–0	Airdrieonians	27 August 1983	1–2
Clydebank	1–0	Ayr United	27 August 1983	3–1
Dumbarton	1–2	Hibernian	27 August 1983	1–7
Dundee	4–1	Montrose	27 August 1983	7–2
Dunfermline Ath	0–2	Dundee United	27 August 1983	1–8
Forfar Athletic	2–2	St Mirren	27 August 1983	2–3
Heart of Midlothian	1–1	Cowdenbeath	27 August 1983	1–2
Kilmarnock	3–1	Queen's Park	27 August 1983	5–4
Morton	3–1	Hamilton Academical	27 August 1983	4–3
Partick Thistle	1–2	Meadowbank Thistle	27 August 1983	2–4
Queen of the South	1–4	Rangers	27 August 1983	1–8
Raith Rovers	0–3	Aberdeen	27 August 1983	0–12
St Johnstone	6–3	East Fife	27 August 1983	8–4

== Third round ==
=== Group 1 ===
Team	Pld	W	D	L	GF	GA	GD	Pts
Dundee United	6	5	1	0	20	5	+15	11
Motherwell	6	2	1	3	11	14	−3	5
Alloa Athletic	6	2	1	3	10	15	−5	5
Morton	6	1	1	4	7	14	−7	3

Home team	Score	Away team	Date
Dundee United	5–0	Alloa Athletic	30 August 1983
Motherwell	3–0	Morton	31 August 1983
Alloa Athletic	1–2	Motherwell	7 September 1983
Morton	1–1	Dundee United	7 September 1983
Dundee United	4–2	Motherwell	5 October 1983
Morton	2–4	Alloa Athletic	5 October 1983
Dundee United	3–0	Morton	26 October 1983
Motherwell	2–2	Alloa Athletic	26 October 1983
Alloa Athletic	2–4	Dundee United	9 November 1983
Morton	4–2	Motherwell	9 November 1983
Alloa Athletic	1–0	Morton	30 November 1983
Motherwell	0–3	Dundee United	30 November 1983

=== Group 2 ===
Team	Pld	W	D	L	GF	GA	GD	Pts
Rangers	6	6	0	0	18	0	+18	12
Heart of Midlothian	6	2	2	2	9	9	0	6
Clydebank	6	1	2	3	6	14	−8	4
St Mirren	6	0	2	4	6	16	−10	2

Home team	Score	Away team	Date
Rangers	4–0	Clydebank	31 August 1983
St Mirren	2–2	Heart of Midlothian	31 August 1983
Clydebank	2–0	St Mirren	7 September 1983
Heart of Midlothian	0–3	Rangers	7 September 1983
Heart of Midlothian	1–1	Clydebank	5 October 1983
Rangers	5–0	St Mirren	5 October 1983
Rangers	2–0	Heart of Midlothian	26 October 1983
St Mirren	3–3	Clydebank	26 October 1983
Clydebank	0–3	Rangers	9 November 1983
Heart of Midlothian	3–1	St Mirren	9 November 1983
Clydebank	0–3	Heart of Midlothian	30 November 1983
St Mirren	0–1	Rangers	30 November 1983

=== Group 3 ===
Team	Pld	W	D	L	GF	GA	GD	Pts
Aberdeen	6	5	1	0	11	2	+9	11
Dundee	6	3	2	1	8	4	+4	8
Meadowbank Thistle	6	1	2	3	4	10	−6	4
St Johnstone	6	0	1	5	2	9	−7	1

Home team	Score	Away team	Date
Aberdeen	4–0	Meadowbank Thistle	31 August 1983
Dundee	2–1	St Johnstone	31 August 1983
Meadowbank Thistle	0–1	Dundee	7 September 1983
St Johnstone	0–1	Aberdeen	7 September 1983
St Johnstone	1–2	Meadowbank Thistle	4 October 1983
Aberdeen	0–0	Dundee	5 October 1983
Dundee	1–1	Meadowbank Thistle	25 October 1983
Aberdeen	1–0	St Johnstone	26 October 1983
Meadowbank Thistle	1–3	Aberdeen	9 November 1983
St Johnstone	0–3	Dundee	9 November 1983
Dundee	1–2	Aberdeen	30 November 1983
Meadowbank Thistle	0–0	St Johnstone	30 November 1983

=== Group 4 ===
Team	Pld	W	D	L	GF	GA	GD	Pts
Celtic	6	3	3	0	13	3	+10	9
Kilmarnock	6	3	1	2	9	6	+3	7
Hibernian	6	2	2	2	7	9	−2	6
Airdrieonians	6	0	2	4	3	14	−11	2

Home team	Score	Away team	Date
Airdrieonians	1–6	Celtic	31 August 1983
Hibernian	2–0	Kilmarnock	31 August 1983
Celtic	5–1	Hibernian	7 September 1983
Kilmarnock	3–0	Airdrieonians	7 September 1983
Celtic	1–1	Kilmarnock	5 October 1983
Hibernian	0–0	Airdrieonians	5 October 1983
Airdrieonians	1–2	Kilmarnock	26 October 1983
Hibernian	0–0	Celtic	26 October 1983
Celtic	0–0	Airdrieonians	9 November 1983
Kilmarnock	3–1	Hibernian	9 November 1983
Airdrieonians	1–3	Hibernian	30 November 1983
Kilmarnock	0–1	Celtic	30 November 1983

== Semi-finals ==
=== First leg ===
Home team	Score	Away team	Date
Aberdeen	0–0	Celtic	22 February 1984
Dundee United	1–1	Rangers	14 February 1984

=== Second leg ===
Home team	Score	Away team	Date	Agg
Celtic	1–0	Aberdeen	10 March 1984	1–0
Rangers	2–0	Dundee United	22 February 1984	3–1

== Final ==
25 March 1984

Rangers	3–2 (aet.)	Celtic
McCoist		McClair; Reid pen.'

Hampden Park, Glasgow
Attendance: 66,369
Referee: Bob Valentine
