= Alex Taylor (footballer) =

Scottish footballer

Personal information
- Full name: Alexander Taylor
- Date of birth: 13 June 1962 (age 64)
- Place of birth: Glasgow, Scotland
- Height: 5 ft 7 in (1.70 m)
- Position: Midfielder

Senior career*
Years	Team	Apps	(Gls)
1982–1986	Dundee United	33	(6)
1986–1988	Hamilton Academical	67	(5)
1988–1990	Walsall	45	(6)
1990–1993	Falkirk	59	(4)
1993	→ Partick Thistle (loan)	8	(1)
1993–1995	Partick Thistle	63	(7)
1995–1997	Raith Rovers	26	(2)
1997–1999	Ross County	60	(8)
1999–2001	Forfar Athletic	36	(4)
Total		397	(43)
- * Club domestic league appearances and goals

Alexander Taylor (born 13 June 1962) is a Scottish former footballer who played as a midfielder.

== Career ==
Taylor began his career with Dundee United and played over thirty league games for the Tannadice team before leaving for Hamilton Academical in 1986. During his time at Douglas Park, Taylor picked up a Scottish First Division winners' medal and was crowned the SPFA Players' Player of the Year for the First Division before heading to Walsall in 1988. Taylor returned to Scotland in 1990 with Falkirk and went on to make just over fifty league appearances for the Bairns. After spending the latter part of the 1992-93 season on loan at Partick Thistle, Taylor moved there permanently after the summer, playing sixty-three league matches over a two-year period. Similar spells with Raith Rovers, Ross County and Forfar Athletic followed, with Taylor picking up a Scottish Third Division winners' medal during his time with County. After leaving Forfar in January 2001, Taylor was training with Airdrie but failed to win a deal as the club were struggling with severe financial issues. Taylor subsequently retired from professional football and now runs a number of businesses in Hamilton and Kirkcaldy.

== Honours ==
- SPFA Players' Player of the Year (First Division): 1

1987-88

- Scottish First Division: 1

1987-88

- Scottish Third Division: 1

1998-99
