= John Reilly (footballer, born 1962) =

Scottish footballer

Personal information
- Full name: John Reilly
- Date of birth: 21 March 1962 (age 64)
- Place of birth: Dundee, Scotland
- Position: Striker

Youth career
- Dundee United

Senior career*
Years	Team	Apps	(Gls)
1980–1985	Dundee United	58	(19)
1985–1987	Motherwell	56	(12)
1991–1993	Dunfermline Athletic	6	(0)
1993	East Fife	9	(5)
1993–1994	Cowdenbeath	13	(0)
1994	Arbroath	3	(2)
1994	Forfar Athletic	1	(0)
1995	Albion Rovers	10	(1)

Managerial career
- 1993–1994: Cowdenbeath
- * Club domestic league appearances and goals

John Reilly (born 21 March 1962, in Dundee) is a Scottish former professional footballer who played as a striker. Reilly began his career with Dundee United, signing as a schoolboy from Strathtay Boys Club in 1979. He played for the Scotland Under 17 and Under 18 professional youth sides before making his first-team debut in August 1980. He was a member of the squad that won a Premier League Winners medal in season 1982–1983 before going on to score Dundee United's first ever goal in the European Cup the following season. Signing for Motherwell in 1985, Reilly suffered an achilles tendon injury in his first game for the club and despite seeing several specialists over the next 18 months was forced into early retirement. After revolutionary surgery five years later however, he was able to continue playing and went on to play a handful of games for a number of Scottish lower league clubs, including Dunfermline Athletic and East Fife, while taking on a player/manager role at Cowdenbeath F.C.

After retiring for the second time in the mid-1990s, Reilly remained in the game working as a journalist covering lower-division football for a national newspaper. Reilly was inducted into Dundee United's Hall of Fame in February 2013.

== Honours ==
=== Dundee United ===
- Scottish Premier Division: 1

1982–83

inducted to Hall of Fame 2013
