= Derek Stark (footballer) =

Scottish footballer

Personal information
- Date of birth: 19 November 1958 (age 67)
- Place of birth: Dunfermline, Scotland
- Position: Defender

Senior career*
Years	Team	Apps	(Gls)
- Glenrothes
1976–1985	Dundee United	164	(7)
- * Club domestic league appearances and goals

Derek Stark (born 19 November 1958) is a Scottish retired footballer who played as a defender. He played for Dundee United – his only senior club – from 1976 to 1985, when he retired through injury at the age of 26. Although he was a part-time footballer for most of his career, he won the Scottish Premier Division title in 1982–83 and the Scottish League Cup twice.

== Early life ==
Derek Stark was born in Dunfermline, Fife, on 19 November 1958. He represented the Scottish Schools football team.

== Playing career ==
Stark played for Glenrothes and joined Dundee United as a provisional signing in March 1975, before being called up to join the reserve squad in May 1976. He appeared for the first team in a friendly against East Fife in August 1977. His competitive debut came in a Premier Division match against Clydebank at Kilbowie Park on 2 May 1978. He went on to be a first team regular over the next six seasons. Originally a central defender, he came to play more regularly as a full back and occasionally in midfield. His goal against Morton in March 1979 was included in the BBC's Goal of the Season competition.

Stark won two Scottish League Cup winner's medals early in his career. He played in both matches of the 1979 final against Aberdeen and was an unused substitute in the 1980 final against Dundee. He also gained runners-up medals in both the Scottish Cup and League Cup during 1981.

During this period of his career, Stark was still a part-time footballer, also working in a coachworks in Kinross. After losing this job Stark briefly walked out on Dundee United in December 1981, intending to join the police, but subsequently returned to the club. Having signed a full-time contract in 1982, he was part of the side that were Scottish Football League champions in 1982–83, playing in 32 out of 36 league matches that season.

The 1983–84 season was Stark's last in senior football. Having played with a knee injury throughout the season, he developed a problem with a cyst on his cartilage. He scored a long range goal against A.S. Roma in a European Cup semi-final tie at Tannadice in April 1984, but played his last senior match less than three weeks later.

== After football ==
Several operations failed to cure Stark's injury problems and he officially retired in September 1985, aged 26. He subsequently resumed his former career ambition, becoming a police officer with Fife Constabulary. He was inducted into the Dundee United Hall of Fame in 2015.

== Honours ==
Dundee United

- Scottish Football League Premier Division: 1982–83
- Scottish League Cup: 1979–80, 1980–81
