= Swedish football clubs in European competitions =

This is a list of Swedish football clubs in European competition. Swedish clubs have participated since 1955, when Djurgårdens IF entered the 1955–56 European Cup and played Gwardia Warszawa of Poland in the first round. A total of 25 clubs have participated in UEFA competitions throughout the years.

In results, IFK Göteborg has won the UEFA Cup on two occasions, by beating Hamburger SV in the 1982 UEFA Cup final and Dundee United in the 1987 UEFA Cup final. Further on, Malmö FF reached the 1979 European Cup final, which they lost to Nottingham Forest. IFK Göteborg also reached the semi-finals of the 1985–86 European Cup, which they lost to Barcelona and Swedish teams reached the quarter-finals of the UEFA Cup Winners' Cup on four occasions.

Swedish teams have also competed internationally in the Inter-Cities Fairs Cup and the pre-UEFA Intertoto Cup. Further on, eight teams competed in the 1959–62 Nordic Cup and four teams competed in each of three editions of the Royal League. After the 1979 European Cup final, Nottingham Forest declined to play in the 1979 Intercontinental Cup, and runners-up Malmö FF took their spot, losing to Club Olimpia of Paraguay.

Swedish teams have met teams from present Germany the most, 70 times, followed by Italy on 67 times. Swedish clubs are unbeaten against teams from present Belarus, Gibraltar, Kosovo, Liechtenstein and San Marino.

== Statistics ==
- Most European Cup/Champions League competitions appeared in: 20 – Malmö FF
- Most UEFA Cup/Europa League competitions appeared in: 19 – Malmö FF
- Most Conference League competitions appeared in: 3 – Djurgårdens IF
- Most Cup Winners' Cup competitions appeared in: 5, joint record – AIK, Malmö FF and IFK Norrköping
- Most Intertoto Cup competitions appeared in: 3 – Örgryte IS
- Most competitions appeared in overall: 45 – Malmö FF
- First match played: Djurgårdens IF 0–0 Gwardia Warszawa, 20 September 1955 (1955–56 European Cup first round)
- Most matches played: 221 – Malmö FF
- Most match wins: 81 – Malmö FF
- Most match draws: 48 – Malmö FF
- Most match losses: 92 – Malmö FF
- Biggest win (match): 11 goals – Malmö FF 11–0 Pezoporikos Larnaca (1973–74 European Cup Winners' Cup first round)
- Biggest win (aggregate): 17 goals – IFK Göteborg 17–0 Avenir Beggen (1984–85 European Cup first round)
- Biggest defeat (match): 8 goals – Real Madrid 8–0 Malmö FF (2015–16 UEFA Champions League group stage)
- Biggest defeat (aggregate): 9 goals – IFK Göteborg 2–11 Feyenoord (1961–62 European Cup preliminary round)

=== UEFA coefficient and ranking ===
For the 2023–24 UEFA competitions, the associations will be allocated places according to their 2022 UEFA country coefficients, which take into account their performance in European competitions from 2017–18 to 2021–22. In the 2022 rankings used for the 2023–24 European competitions, Sweden's coefficient points total is 22.875. After earning a score of 5.125 during the 2021–22 European campaign, Sweden is ranked by UEFA as the 23rd best association in Europe out of 55 – staying in the same position as the previous season.

- 21 Cyprus 26.375
- 22 Iceland 24.375
- 23 Sweden 22.875
- 24 Bulgaria 19.500
- 25 Romania 17.150
  - Full list

== Appearances in UEFA competitions ==
As of 1 November 2025

Club	Total						UCL	UEL	UECL	ECWC	UIC	First appearance	Last appearance
Club	Apps	Pld	W	D	L	Win%	UCL	UEL	UECL	ECWC	UIC	First appearance	Last appearance
AIK	29	126	42	33	51	33.33	4	17	2	5	1	1973–74 UC	2025–26 UECL
Åtvidabergs FF	6	24	8	7	9	33.33	2	2	0	2	0	1970–71 ECWC	2006–07 UC
IK Brage	2	6	1	1	4	16.67	0	2	0	0	0	1982–83 UC	1988–89 UC
IF Brommapojkarna	1	6	2	1	3	33.33	0	1	0	0	0	2014–15 UEL	2014–15 UEL
Degerfors IF	1	4	2	0	2	50.00	0	0	0	1	0	1993–94 ECWC	1993–94 ECWC
Djurgårdens IF	23	89	36	20	33	40.45	7	9	3	3	1	1955–56 EC	2024–25 UECL
IF Elfsborg	21	108	47	23	38	43.52	2	16	2	0	1	1971–72 UC	2024–25 UEL
GAIS	2	4	1	1	2	25.00	0	2	0	0	0	1975–76 UC	1990–91 UC
Gefle IF	3	12	5	1	6	41.67	0	3	0	0	0	2006–07 UC	2013–14 UEL
IFK Göteborg	35	165	73	34	58	44.24	15	16	0	2	1	1958–59 EC	2020–21 UEL
BK Häcken	11	56	21	14	21	37.50	1	8	3	0	0	2007–08 UC	2025–26 UECL
Halmstads BK	11	46	19	11	16	41.30	4	4	0	1	2	1977–78 EC	2005–06 UC
Hammarby IF	11	44	19	11	14	43.18	1	4	3	1	2	1983–84 ECWC	2025–26 UECL
Helsingborgs IF	12	74	27	23	24	36.49	2	8	0	1	1	1996–97 UC	2012–13 UEL
Kalmar FF	11	40	22	4	14	55.00	1	5	1	3	1	1978–79 ECWC	2023–24 UECL
Landskrona BoIS	2	4	1	0	3	25.00	0	1	0	1	0	1972–73 ECWC	1977–78 UC
Malmö FF	45	234	87	51	96	37.18	21	20	0	5	1	1964–65 UC	2025–26 UEL
IFK Malmö	1	6	3	1	2	50.00	1	0	0	0	0	1960–61 EC	1960–61 EC
IFK Norrköping	20	64	23	17	24	35.94	5	9	0	5	1	1956–57 EC	2019–20 UEL
Örebro SK	7	20	4	6	10	20.00	0	5	0	0	2	1991–92 UC	2011–12 UEL
Örgryte IS	6	20	8	4	8	40.00	1	2	0	0	3	1986–87 EC	2003 UIC
Östers IF	16	44	12	7	25	27.27	4	9	0	1	2	1969–70 EC	2004–05 UC
Östersunds FK	1	14	8	3	3	57.14	0	1	0	0	0	2017–18 UEL	2017–18 UEL
Trelleborgs FF	1	6	3	2	1	50.00	0	1	0	0	0	1994–95 UC	1994–95 UC
Västra Frölunda IF	1	4	1	1	2	25.00	0	0	0	0	1	2000 UIC	2000 UIC

Legend: (bold) – currently in indicated competition; EC – European Cup; ECWC – European Cup Winner's Cup; UIC – UEFA Intertoto Cup, UC – UEFA Cup; UCL – UEFA Champions League, UEL – UEFA Europa League; UECL – UEFA Europa Conference League.

== Active competitions ==
=== UEFA Champions League ===
Djurgårdens IF became the first Swedish team to enter the European Cup, by contesting in the 1955–56 inaugural edition. Malmö FF reached the 1979 European Cup final, which they lost to Nottingham Forest.

These are the appearances of Swedish football clubs in the European Cup and the UEFA Champions League:

Season	Club	Round	Opponent	Home	Away	Agg
European Cup
1955–56	Djurgårdens IF	1R	(Poland) Gwardia Warszawa	0–0	4–1	4–1
1955–56	Djurgårdens IF	QF	(Scotland) Hibernian	1–3	0–1	1–4
1956–57	IFK Norrköping	1R	(Italy) Fiorentina	0–1	1–1	1–2
1957–58	IFK Norrköping	1R	(Socialist Federal Republic of Yugoslavia) Red Star Belgrade	2–2	1–2	3–4
1958–59	IFK Göteborg	PR	(Luxembourg) Jeunesse d'Esch	0–1	2–1	2–2 (5–1 r)
1958–59	IFK Göteborg	1R	(East Germany) Wismut Karl-Marx-Stadt	2–2	0–4	2–6
1959–60	IFK Göteborg	PR	(Northern Ireland) Linfield	6–1	1–2	7–3
1959–60	IFK Göteborg	1R	(Netherlands) Sparta Rotterdam	3–1	1–3	4–4 (1–3 r)
1960–61	IFK Malmö	PR	(Finland) HIFK	2–1	3–1	5–2
1960–61	IFK Malmö	1R	(Bulgaria) CDNA Sofia	1–0	1–1	2–1
1960–61	IFK Malmö	QF	(Austria) Rapid Wien	0–2	0–2	0–4
1961–62	IFK Göteborg	PR	(Netherlands) Feyenoord	0–3	2–8	2–11
1962–63	IFK Norrköping	PR	(Albania) Partizani Tirana	2–0	1–1	3–1
1962–63	IFK Norrköping	1R	(Portugal) Benfica	1–1	1–5	2–6
1963–64	IFK Norrköping	PR	(Belgium) Standard Liège	2–0	0–1	2–1
1963–64	IFK Norrköping	1R	(Italy) Milan	1–1	2–5	3–6
1964–65	Malmö FF	PR	(Bulgaria) Lokomotiv Sofia	2–0	3–8	5–8
1965–66	Djurgårdens IF	PR	(Bulgaria) Levski Sofia	2–1	0–6	2–7
1966–67	Malmö FF	1R	(Spain) Atlético Madrid	0–2	1–3	1–5
1967–68	Djurgårdens IF	1R	(Poland) Gornik Zabrze	0–1	0–3	0–4
1968–69	Malmö FF	1R	(Italy) Milan	2–1	1–4	3–5
1969–70	Östers IF	1R	(Italy) Fiorentina	1–2	0–1	1–3
1970–71	IFK Göteborg	1R	(Poland) Legia Warsaw	0–4	1–2	1–6
1971–72	Malmö FF	1R	(Hungary) Újpesti Dózsa	1–0	0–4	1–4
1972–73	Malmö FF	1R	(Portugal) Benfica	1–0	1–4	2–4
1973–74	Åtvidabergs FF	1R	(West Germany) Bayern Munich	3–1	1–3	4–4 (3–4 p)
1974–75	Åtvidabergs FF	1R	(Romania) Universitatea Craiova	3–1	1–2	4–3
1974–75	Åtvidabergs FF	2R	(Finland) HJK	1–0	3–0	4–0
1974–75	Åtvidabergs FF	QF	(Spain) Barcelona	0–3	0–2	0–5
1975–76	Malmö FF	1R	(East Germany) 1. FC Magdeburg	2–1	1–2	3–3 (2–1 p)
1975–76	Malmö FF	2R	(West Germany) Bayern Munich	1–0	0–2	1–2
1976–77	Malmö FF	1R	(Italy) Torino	1–1	1–2	2–3
1977–78	Halmstads BK	1R	(East Germany) Dynamo Dresden	2–1	0–2	2–3
1978–79	Malmö FF	1R	(France) Monaco	1–0	0–0	1–0
1978–79	Malmö FF	2R	(Soviet Union) Dynamo Kyiv	2–0	0–0	2–0
1978–79	Malmö FF	QF	(Poland) Wisła Kraków	4–1	1–2	5–3
1978–79	Malmö FF	SF	Austria Wien	1–0	0–0	1–0
1978–79	Malmö FF	F	(England) Nottingham Forest	0–1		
1979–80	Östers IF	1R	(England) Nottingham Forest	1–1	0–2	1–3
1980–81	Halmstads BK	1R	(Denmark) Esbjerg	0–0	2–3	2–3
1981–82	Östers IF	1R	(West Germany) Bayern Munich	0–1	0–5	0–6
1982–83	Östers IF	1R	(Greece) Olympiacos	1–0	0–2	1–2
1983–84	IFK Göteborg	1R	(Italy) Roma	2–1	0–3	2–4
1984–85	IFK Göteborg	1R	(Luxembourg) Avenir Beggen	9–0	8–0	17–0
1984–85	IFK Göteborg	2R	(Belgium) Beveren	1–0	1–2 (a.e.t.)	2–2 (a)
1984–85	IFK Göteborg	QF	(Greece) Panathinaikos	0–1	2–2	2–3
1985–86	IFK Göteborg	1R	(Bulgaria) Trakia Plovdiv	3–2	2–1	5–3
1985–86	IFK Göteborg	2R	(Turkey) Fenerbahçe	4–0	1–2	5–2
1985–86	IFK Göteborg	QF	(Scotland) Aberdeen	0–0	2–2	2–2 (a)
1985–86	IFK Göteborg	SF	(Spain) Barcelona	3–0	0–3	3–3 (4–5 p)
1986–87	Örgryte IS	1R	(East Germany) Dynamo Berlin	2–3	1–4	3–7
1987–88	Malmö FF	1R	(Belgium) Anderlecht	0–1	1–1	1–2
1988–89	IFK Göteborg	1R	(Cyprus) Pezoporikos Larnaca	5–1	2–1	7–2
1988–89	IFK Göteborg	2R	(Albania) 17 Nëntori Tirana	1–0	3–0	4–0
1988–89	IFK Göteborg	QR	(Romania) CSA Steaua București	1–0	1–5	2–5
1989–90	Malmö FF	1R	(Italy) Internazionale	1–0	1–1	2–1
1989–90	Malmö FF	2R	(Belgium) KV Mechelen	0–0	1–4	1–4
1990–91	Malmö FF	1R	(Turkey) Beşiktaş	3–2	2–2	5–4
1990–91	Malmö FF	2R	(East Germany) Dynamo Dresden	1–1	1–1	2–2 (4–5 p)
1991–92	IFK Göteborg	1QR	(Albania) Flamurtari Vlorë	0–0	1–1	1–1 (a)
1991–92	IFK Göteborg	2QR	(Greece) Panathinaikos	2–2	0–2	2–4
UEFA Champions League
1992–93	IFK Göteborg	1QR	(Turkey) Beşiktaş	2–0	1–2	3–2
1992–93	IFK Göteborg	2QR	(Poland) Lech Poznań	1–0	3–0	4–0
1992–93	IFK Göteborg	GS	(Italy) Milan	0–1	0–4	2nd
1992–93	IFK Göteborg	GS	(Portugal) Porto	1–0	0–2	2nd
1992–93	IFK Göteborg	GS	(Netherlands) PSV	3–0	3–1	2nd
1993–94	AIK	1QR	(Czech Republic) Sparta Prague	1–0	0–2	1–2
1994–95	IFK Göteborg	QR	(Czech Republic) Sparta Prague	2–0	0–1	2–1
1994–95	IFK Göteborg	GS	(England) Manchester United	3–1	2–4	1st
1994–95	IFK Göteborg	GS	(Spain) Barcelona	2–1	1–1	1st
1994–95	IFK Göteborg	GS	(Turkey) Galatasaray	1–0	1–0	1st
1994–95	IFK Göteborg	QF	(Germany) Bayern Munich	2–2	0–0	2–2 (a)
1995–96	IFK Göteborg	QR	(Poland) Legia Warsaw	1–2	0–1	1–3
1996–97	IFK Göteborg	QR	(Hungary) Ferencváros	3–0	1–1	4–1
1996–97	IFK Göteborg	GS	(Norway) Rosenborg	2–3	0–1	4th
1996–97	IFK Göteborg	GS	(Portugal) Porto	0–2	1–2	4th
1996–97	IFK Göteborg	GS	(Italy) Milan	2–1	2–4	4th
1997–98	IFK Göteborg	2QR	(Scotland) Rangers	3–0	1–1	4–1
1997–98	IFK Göteborg	GS	(France) Paris Saint-Germain	0–1	0–3	4th
1997–98	IFK Göteborg	GS	(Germany) Bayern Munich	1–3	1–0	4th
1997–98	IFK Göteborg	GS	(Turkey) Beşiktaş	2–1	0–1	4th
1998–99	Halmstads BK	1QR	(Bulgaria) Litex Lovech	2–1	0–2	2–3
1999–00	AIK	3QR	(Greece) AEK Athens	1–0	0–0	1–0
1999–00	AIK	GS	(Spain) Barcelona	1–2	0–5	4th
1999–00	AIK	GS	(England) Arsenal	2–3	1–3	4th
1999–00	AIK	GS	(Italy) Fiorentina	0–0	0–3	4th
2000–01	Helsingborgs IF	2QR	(Belarus) BATE Borisov	0–0	3–0	3–0
2000–01	Helsingborgs IF	3QR	(Italy) Internazionale	1–0	0–0	1–0
2000–01	Helsingborgs IF	GS	(Germany) Bayern Munich	1–3	0–0	4th
2000–01	Helsingborgs IF	GS	(France) Paris Saint-Germain	1–1	1–4	4th
2000–01	Helsingborgs IF	GS	(Norway) Rosenborg	2–0	1–6	4th
2001–02	Halmstads BK	2QR	(Republic of Ireland) Bohemians	2–0	2–1	4–1
2001–02	Halmstads BK	3QR	(Belgium) Anderlecht	2–3	1–1	3–4 (to UEFA Cup)
2002–03	Hammarby IF	2QR	(Serbia and Montenegro) Partizan	1–1	0–4	1–5
2003–04	Djurgårdens IF	2QR	(Serbia and Montenegro) Partizan	2–2	1–1	3–3 (a)
2004–05	Djurgårdens IF	2QR	(Lithuania) FBK Kaunas	0–0	2–0	2–0
2004–05	Djurgårdens IF	3QR	(Italy) Juventus	1–4	2–2	3–6 (to UEFA Cup)
2005–06	Malmö FF	2QR	(Israel) Maccabi Haifa	3–2	2–2	5–4
2005–06	Malmö FF	3QR	(Switzerland) Thun	0–1	0–3	0–4 (to UEFA Cup)
2006–07	Djurgårdens IF	2QR	(Slovakia) MFK Ružomberok	1–0	1–3	2–3
2007–08	IF Elfsborg	1QR	(Northern Ireland) Linfield	1–0	0–0	1–0
2007–08	IF Elfsborg	2QR	(Hungary) Debrecen	0–0	1–0	1–0
2007–08	IF Elfsborg	3QR	(Spain) Valencia	1–2	0–3	1–5 (to UEFA Cup)
2008–09	IFK Göteborg	1QR	(San Marino) Murata	4–0	5–0	9–0
2008–09	IFK Göteborg	2QR	(Switzerland) Basel	1–1	2–4	3–5
2009–10	Kalmar FF	2QR	(Hungary) Debrecen	3–1	0–2	3–3 (a)
2010–11	AIK	2QR	(Luxembourg) Jeunesse d'Esch	1–0	0–0	1–0
2010–11	AIK	3QR	(Norway) Rosenborg	0–1	1–2	1–3 (to EL)
2011–12	Malmö FF	2QR	(Faroe Islands) HB Tórshavn	2–0	1–1	3–1
2011–12	Malmö FF	3QR	(Scotland) Rangers	1–1	1–0	2–1
2011–12	Malmö FF	PO	(Croatia) Dinamo Zagreb	2–0	1–4	3–4 (to EL)
2012–13	Helsingborgs IF	2QR	(Wales) The New Saints	3–0	0–0	3–0
2012–13	Helsingborgs IF	3QR	(Poland) Śląsk Wrocław	3–1	3–0	6–1
2012–13	Helsingborgs IF	PO	(Scotland) Celtic	0–2	0–2	0–4 (to EL)
2013–14	IF Elfsborg	2QR	(Latvia) Daugava	7–1	4–0	11–1
2013–14	IF Elfsborg	3QR	(Scotland) Celtic	0–0	0–1	0–1 (to EL)
2014–15	Malmö FF	2QR	(Latvia) Ventspils	0–0	1–0	1–0
2014–15	Malmö FF	3QR	(Czech Republic) Sparta Prague	2–0	2–4	4–4 (a)
2014–15	Malmö FF	PO	(Austria) Red Bull Salzburg	3–0	1–2	4–2
2014–15	Malmö FF	GS	(Spain) Atlético Madrid	0–2	0–5	4th
2014–15	Malmö FF	GS	(Italy) Juventus	0–2	0–2	4th
2014–15	Malmö FF	GS	(Greece) Olympiacos	2–0	2–4	4th
2015–16	Malmö FF	2QR	(Lithuania) Žalgiris	0–0	1–0	1–0
2015–16	Malmö FF	3QR	(Austria) Red Bull Salzburg	3–0	0–2	3–2
2015–16	Malmö FF	PO	(Scotland) Celtic	2–0	2–3	4–3
2015–16	Malmö FF	GS	(France) Paris Saint-Germain	0–5	0–2	4th
2015–16	Malmö FF	GS	(Spain) Real Madrid	0–2	0–8	4th
2015–16	Malmö FF	GS	(Ukraine) Shakhtar Donetsk	1–0	0–4	4th
2016–17	IFK Norrköping	1QR	(Norway) Rosenborg	3–2	1–3	4–5
2017–18	Malmö FF	2QR	(North Macedonia) Vardar	1–1	1–3	2–4
2018–19	Malmö FF	1QR	(Kosovo) Drita	2–0	3–0	5–0
2018–19	Malmö FF	2QR	(Romania) CFR Cluj	1–1	1–0	2–1
2018–19	Malmö FF	3QR	(Hungary) Fehérvár	1–1	0–0	1–1 (a) (to EL)
2019–20	AIK	1QR	Ararat-Armenia	3–1	1–2	4–3
2019–20	AIK	2QR	(Slovenia) Maribor	3–2 (a.e.t.)	1–2	4–4 (a) (to EL)
2020–21	Djurgårdens IF	1QR	(Hungary) Ferencváros	0–2 (to EL)		
2021–22	Malmö FF	1QR	(Latvia) Riga	1–0	1–1	2–1
2021–22	Malmö FF	2QR	(Finland) HJK	2–1	2–2	4–3
2021–22	Malmö FF	3QR	(Scotland) Rangers	2–1	2–1	4–2
2021–22	Malmö FF	PO	(Bulgaria) Ludogorets Razgrad	2–0	1–2	3–2
2021–22	Malmö FF	GS	(England) Chelsea	0–1	0–4	4th
2021–22	Malmö FF	GS	(Italy) Juventus	0–3	0–1	4th
2021–22	Malmö FF	GS	(Russia) Zenit Saint Petersburg	1–1	0–4	4th
2022–23	Malmö FF	1QR	(Iceland) Víkingur Reykjavík	3–2	3–3	6–5
2022–23	Malmö FF	2QR	(Lithuania) Žalgiris	0–2	0–1	0–3 (to EL)
2023–24	BK Häcken	1QR	(Wales) The New Saints	3–1	2–0	5–1
2023–24	BK Häcken	2QR	(Faroe Islands) KÍ	0–0	3–3	3–3 (3–4 p) (to EL)
2024–25	Malmö FF	2QR	(Faroe Islands) KÍ	4–1	2–3	6–4
2024–25	Malmö FF	3QR	(Greece) PAOK	2–2	4–3 (a.e.t.)	6–5
2024–25	Malmö FF	PO	(Czech Republic) Sparta Prague	0–2	0–2	0–4 (to EL)
2025–26	Malmö FF	1QR	(Georgia (country)) Iberia 1999	3–1	3–1	6–2
2025–26	Malmö FF	2QR	(Latvia) RFS	1–0	4–1	5–1
2025–26	Malmö FF	3QR	(Denmark) Copenhagen	0–0	0–5	0–5
2026–27	Mjällby AIF	2QR	(Gibraltar) Lincoln Red Imps	3–0	0–0	3–0
2026–27	Mjällby AIF	3QR	(Slovakia) Slovan Bratislava	1–2	0-2	1-4

=== UEFA Europa League ===
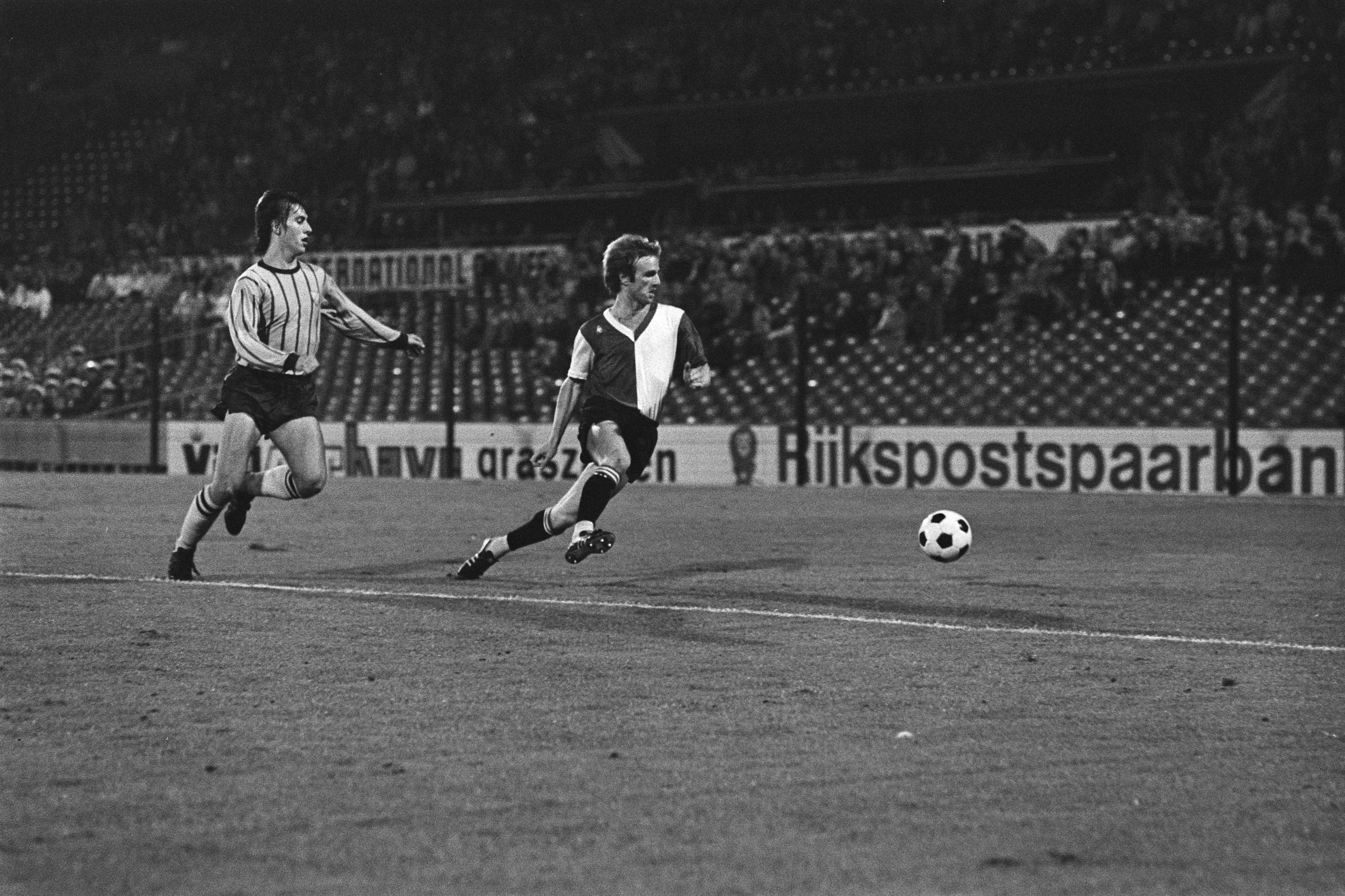
Feyenoord–Djurgården at Feijenoord Stadion in Rotterdam, during the first round of the 1976–77 UEFA Cup

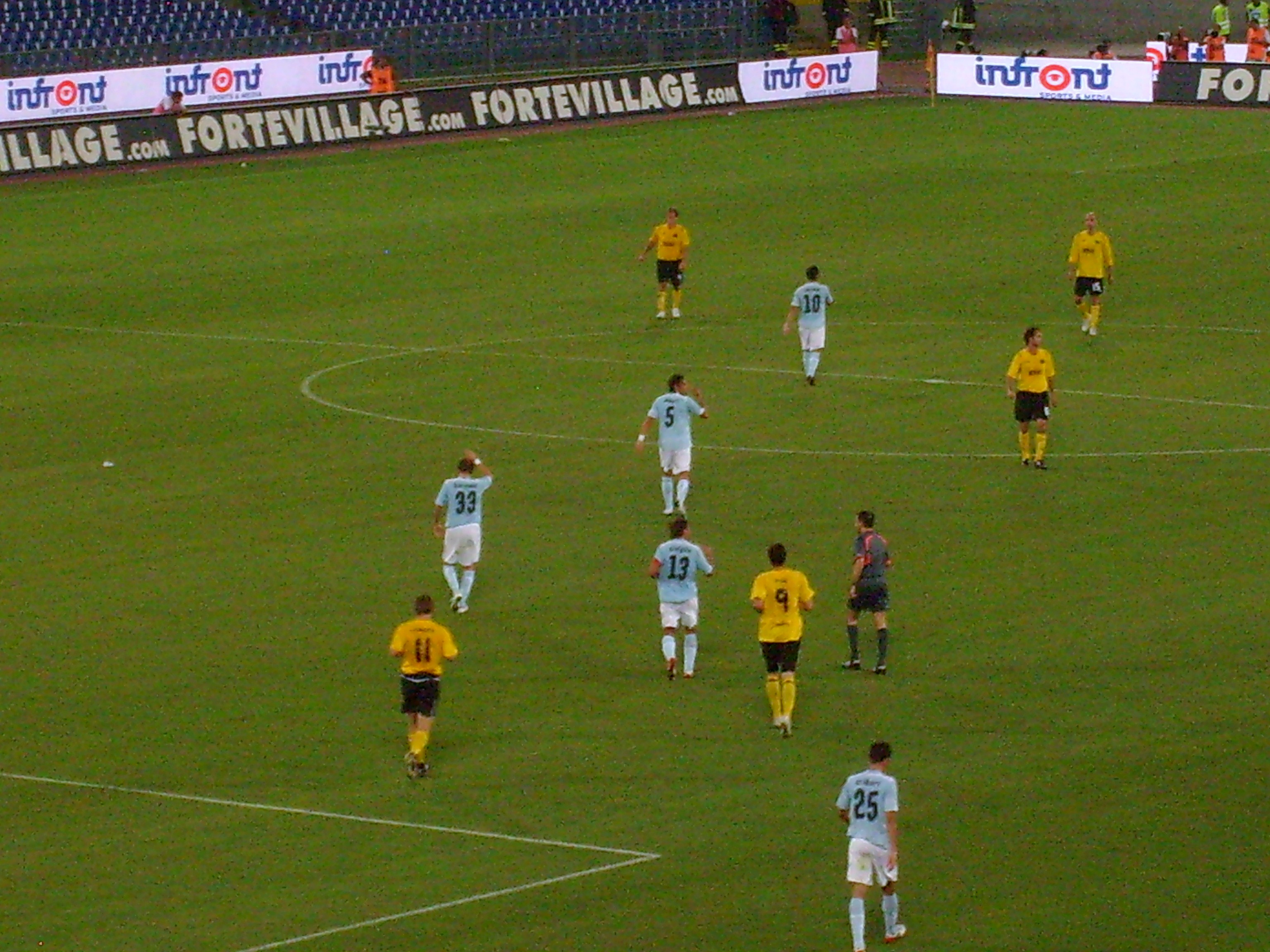
Lazio–Elfsborg at the Stadio Olimpico in Rome, during the play-off round of the 2009–10 UEFA Europa League

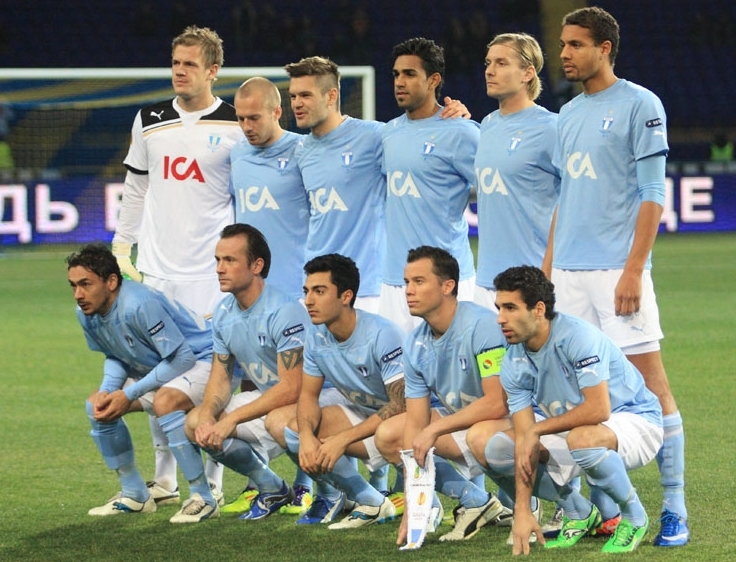
The Malmö FF team lines up before the match against Metalist Kharkiv at Metalist Stadium in Kharkiv during the group stage of the 2011–12 UEFA Europa League

Djurgårdens IF and IF Elfsborg became the first Swedish teams to enter the UEFA Cup, by contesting in the 1971–72 inaugural edition. IFK Göteborg has won the tournament on two occasions, by beating Hamburger SV in the 1982 UEFA Cup final and Dundee United in the 1987 UEFA Cup final.

These are the appearances of Swedish football clubs in the UEFA Cup and the UEFA Europa League:

Season	Club	Round	Opponent	Home	Away	Agg
UEFA Cup
1971–72	Djurgårdens IF	1R	(Socialist Federal Republic of Yugoslavia) OFK Belgrade	2–2	1–4	3–6
1971–72	IF Elfsborg	1R	(West Germany) Hertha BSC	1–4	1–3	2–7
1972–73	Åtvidabergs FF	1R	(Belgium) Club Brugge	3–5	2–1	5–6
1972–73	IFK Norrköping	1R	(Romania) UT Arad	2–0	2–1	4–1
1972–73	IFK Norrköping	2R	(Italy) Internazionale	0–2	2–2	2–4
1973–74	AIK	1R	(Denmark) B 1903	1–1	1–2	2–3
1973–74	Östers IF	1R	(Netherlands) Feyenoord	1–3	1–2	2–5
1974–75	Djurgårdens IF	1R	(Norway) Start	5–0	2–1	7–1
1974–75	Djurgårdens IF	2R	(Czechoslovakia) Dukla Prague	0–2	1–3	1–5
1974–75	Östers IF	1R	(Soviet Union) Dynamo Moscow	3–2	1–2	4–4 (a)
1975–76	AIK	1R	(Soviet Union) Spartak Moscow	1–1	0–1	1–2
1975–76	GAIS	1R	(Poland) Śląsk Wrocław	2–1	2–4	4–5
1975–76	Östers IF	1R	(Norway) Molde	6–0	0–1	6–1
1975–76	Östers IF	2R	(Italy) Roma	1–0	0–2	1–2
1976–77	Djurgårdens IF	1R	(Netherlands) Feyenoord	2–1	0–3	2–4
1976–77	Östers IF	1R	(Finland) KuPS	2–0	2–3	4–3
1976–77	Östers IF	2R	(Scotland) Hibernian	4–1	0–2	4–3
1976–77	Östers IF	3R	(Spain) Barcelona	0–3	1–5	1–8
1977–78	Landskrona BoIS	1R	(England) Ipswich Town	0–1	0–5	0–6
1977–78	Malmö FF	1R	(France) Lens	2–0	1–4	3–4
1978–79	IF Elfsborg	1R	(France) Strasbourg	2–0	1–4	3–4
1978–79	IFK Norrköping	1R	(Scotland) Hibernian	0–0	2–3	2–3
1979–80	Kalmar FF	1R	(Iceland) Keflavík	2–1	0–1	2–2 (a)
1979–80	Malmö FF	1R	(Finland) KPT	2–0	2–1	4–1
1979–80	Malmö FF	2R	(Netherlands) Feyenoord	1–1	0–4	1–5
1980–81	IF Elfsborg	1R	(Scotland) St Mirren	1–2	0–0	1–2
1980–81	IFK Göteborg	1R	(Netherlands) Twente	2–0	1–5	3–5
1981–82	IFK Göteborg	1R	(Finland) Haka	4–0	3–2	7–2
1981–82	IFK Göteborg	2R	(Austria) Sturm Graz	3–2	2–2	5–4
1981–82	IFK Göteborg	3R	(Romania) Dinamo București	3–1	1–0	4–1
1981–82	IFK Göteborg	QF	(Spain) Valencia	2–0	2–2	4–2
1981–82	IFK Göteborg	SF	(West Germany) Kaiserslautern	2–1 (a.e.t.)	1–1	3–2
1981–82	IFK Göteborg	F	(West Germany) Hamburger SV	1–0	3–0	4–0
1981–82	Malmö FF	1R	(Poland) Wisła Kraków	2–0	3–1	5–1
1981–82	Malmö FF	2R	(Switzerland) Neuchâtel Xamax	0–1	0–1	0–2
1982–83	IK Brage	1R	(Denmark) Lyngby	2–2	2–1	4–3
1982–83	IK Brage	2R	(West Germany) Werder Bremen	2–6	0–2	2–8
1982–83	IFK Norrköping	1R	(England) Southampton	0–0	2–2	2–2 (a)
1982–83	IFK Norrköping	2R	(Italy) Roma	1–0	0–1	1–1 (2–4 p)
1983–84	Malmö FF	1R	(West Germany) Werder Bremen	1–2	1–1	2–3
1983–84	IF Elfsborg	1R	(Poland) Widzew Łódź	2–2	0–0	2–2 (a)
1984–85	AIK	1R	(Scotland) Dundee United	1–0	0–3	1–3
1984–85	Östers IF	1R	(Austria) LASK	0–1	0–1	0–2
1985–86	Hammarby IF	1R	(Bulgaria) Pirin Blagoevgrad	4–0	3–1	7–1
1985–86	Hammarby IF	2R	(Scotland) St Mirren	3–3	2–1	5–4
1985–86	Hammarby IF	3R	(West Germany) 1. FC Köln	2–1	1–3	3–4
1985–86	Malmö FF	1R	(Hungary) Videoton	3–2	0–1	3–3 (a)
1986–87	IFK Göteborg	1R	(Czechoslovakia) Sigma Olomouc	4–0	1–1	5–1
1986–87	IFK Göteborg	2R	(East Germany) Stahl Brandenburg	2–0	1–1	3–1
1986–87	IFK Göteborg	3R	(Belgium) Gent	4–0	1–0	5–0
1986–87	IFK Göteborg	QF	(Italy) Internazionale	0–0	1–1	1–1 (a)
1986–87	IFK Göteborg	SF	(Austria) Swarovski Tirol	4–1	1–0	5–1
1986–87	IFK Göteborg	F	(Scotland) Dundee United	1–0	1–1	2–1
1986–87	Kalmar FF	1R	(West Germany) Bayer Leverkusen	1–4	0–3	1–7
1987–88	AIK	1R	(Czechoslovakia) Vítkovice	0–2	1–1	1–3
1987–88	IFK Göteborg	1R	(Denmark) Brøndby	0–0	1–2	1–2
1988–89	IK Brage	1R	(Italy) Internazionale	1–2	1–2	2–4
1988–89	Malmö FF	1R	(Soviet Union) Torpedo Moscow	2–0	1–2 (a.e.t.)	3–2
1988–89	Malmö FF	2R	(Italy) Internazionale	0–1	1–1	1–2
1988–89	Östers IF	1R	(Czechoslovakia) FK DAC 1904 Dunajská Streda	2–0	0–6	2–6
1989–90	IFK Göteborg	1R	(Soviet Union) Žalgiris	1–0	0–2	1–2
1989–90	Örgryte IS	1R	(West Germany) Hamburger SV	1–2	1–5	2–7
1990–91	GAIS	1R	(Soviet Union) Torpedo Moscow	1–1	1–4	2–5
1990–91	IFK Norrköping	1R	(West Germany) 1. FC Köln	0–0	1–3	1–3
1991–92	Örebro SK	1R	(Netherlands) Ajax	0–1	0–3	0–4
1991–92	Östers IF	1R	(France) Lyon	1–1	0–1	1–2
1992–93	IFK Norrköping	1R	(Italy) Torino	1–0	0–3	1–3
1992–93	Örebro SK	1R	(Belgium) KV Mechelen	0–0	1–2	1–2
1993–94	IFK Norrköping	1R	(Belgium) KV Mechelen	0–1	1–1 (a.e.t.)	1–2
1993–94	Östers IF	1R	(Norway) Kongsvinger	1–3	1–4	2–7
1994–95	AIK	PR	(Lithuania) ROMAR Mažeikiai	2–0	2–0	4–0
1994–95	AIK	1R	(Czech Republic) Slavia Prague	0–0	2–2	2–2 (a)
1994–95	AIK	2R	(Italy) Parma	0–1	0–2	0–3
1994–95	Trelleborgs FF	PR	(Faroe Islands) GÍ	3–2	1–0	4–2
1994–95	Trelleborgs FF	1R	(England) Blackburn Rovers	2–2	1–0	3–2
1994–95	Trelleborgs FF	2R	(Italy) Lazio	0–0	0–1	0–1
1995–96	Malmö FF	PR	(Republic of Ireland) Dundalk	2–0	2–0	4–0
1995–96	Malmö FF	1R	(England) Nottingham Forest	2–1	0–1	2–2 (a)
1995–96	Örebro SK	PR	(Luxembourg) Avenir Beggen	0–0	0–3	0–3
1996–97	Halmstads BK	QR	(North Macedonia) Vardar	0–0	1–0	1–0
1996–97	Halmstads BK	1R	(England) Newcastle United	2–1	0–4	2–5
1996–97	Helsingborgs IF	QR	(Belarus) Dinamo-93 Minsk	1–1	3–0	4–1
1996–97	Helsingborgs IF	1R	(England) Aston Villa	0–0	1–1	1–1 (a)
1996–97	Helsingborgs IF	2R	(Switzerland) Neuchâtel Xamax	2–0	1–1	3–1
1996–97	Helsingborgs IF	3R	(Belgium) Anderlecht	0–0	0–1	0–1
1996–97	Malmö FF	QR	(Latvia) Skonto	1–1	3–0	4–1
1996–97	Malmö FF	1R	(Czech Republic) Slavia Prague	1–2	1–3	2–5
1997–98	Helsingborgs IF	2QR	(Hungary) Ferencváros	0–1	1–0	1–1 (3–4 p)
1997–98	Malmö FF	2QR	(Croatia) Hajduk Split	0–2	2–3	2–5
1997–98	Örebro SK	2QR	(Czech Republic) Jablonec 97	0–0	1–1	1–1 (a)
1997–98	Örebro SK	1R	(Russia) Rotor Volgograd	1–4	0–2	1–6
1998–99	IFK Göteborg	1QR	Union Luxembourg	4–0	3–0	7–0
1998–99	IFK Göteborg	2QR	(Turkey) Fenerbahçe	2–1	0–1	2–2 (a)
1998–99	Malmö FF	1QR	(Armenia) Shirak	5–0	2–0	7–0
1998–99	Malmö FF	2QR	(Croatia) Hajduk Split	1–2	1–1	2–3
1999–00	IFK Göteborg	QR	(Republic of Ireland) Cork City	3–0	0–1	3–1
1999–00	IFK Göteborg	1R	(Poland) Lech Poznań	0–0	2–1	2–1
1999–00	IFK Göteborg	2R	(Italy) Roma	0–2	0–1	0–3
1999–00	Helsingborgs IF	QR	(Latvia) FK Rīga	5–0	0–0	5–0
1999–00	Helsingborgs IF	1R	(Ukraine) Karpaty Lviv	1–1	1–1	2–2 (4–2 p)
1999–00	Helsingborgs IF	2R	(Italy) Parma	1–3	0–1	1–4
2000–01	AIK	QR	(Belarus) Gomel	1–0	2–0	3–0
2000–01	AIK	1R	(Denmark) Herfølge	0–1	1–1 (a.e.t.)	1–2
2000–01	Halmstads BK	QR	(Wales) Bangor City	4–0	7–0	11–0
2000–01	Halmstads BK	1R	(Portugal) Benfica	2–1	2–2	4–3
2000–01	Halmstads BK	2R	(Germany) 1860 Munich	3–2	1–3	4–5
2000–01	IFK Norrköping	QR	(Faroe Islands) GÍ	2–1	2–0	4–1
2000–01	IFK Norrköping	1R	(Czech Republic) Slovan Liberec	2–2	1–2	3–4
2000–01	Örgryte IS	QR	(Northern Ireland) Coleraine	1–0	2–1	3–1
2000–01	Örgryte IS	1R	(Austria) Rapid Wien	1–1	0–3	1–4
2001–02	IF Elfsborg	QR	(Estonia) Narva Trans	5–0	0–3	5–3
2001–02	IF Elfsborg	1R	(Poland) Legia Warsaw	1–6	1–4	2–10
2001–02	Halmstads BK	1R	(Turkey) Gençlerbirliği	1–0	1–1	2–1
2001–02	Halmstads BK	2R	(Portugal) Sporting CP	0–1	1–6	1–7
2001–02	Helsingborgs IF	QR	(Finland) MyPa	2–1	3–1	5–2
2001–02	Helsingborgs IF	1R	(Norway) Odd Grenland	1–1	2–2	3–3 (a)
2001–02	Helsingborgs IF	2R	(England) Ipswich Town	1–3	0–0	1–3
2002–03	AIK	QR	(Iceland) ÍBV	2–0	3–1	5–1
2002–03	AIK	1R	(Turkey) Fenerbahçe	3–3	1–3	4–6
2002–03	Djurgårdens IF	QR	(Republic of Ireland) Shamrock Rovers	2–0	3–1	5–1
2002–03	Djurgårdens IF	1R	(Denmark) Copenhagen	3–1	0–0	3–1
2002–03	Djurgårdens IF	2R	(France) Bordeaux	0–1	1–2	1–3
2002–03	IFK Göteborg	QR	(Moldova) Zimbru Chișinău	2–2	1–3	3–5
2003–04	AIK	QR	(Iceland) Fylkir	1–0	0–0	1–0
2003–04	AIK	1R	(Spain) Valencia	0–1	0–1	0–2
2003–04	Malmö FF	QR	(Northern Ireland) Portadown	4–0	2–0	6–0
2003–04	Malmö FF	1R	(Portugal) Sporting CP	0–1	0–2	0–3
2004–05	Djurgårdens IF	1R	(Netherlands) Utrecht	3–0	0–4	3–4
2004–05	IF Elfsborg	2QR	(Northern Ireland) Glentoran	2–1	1–0	3–1
2004–05	IF Elfsborg	1R	(Croatia) Dinamo Zagreb	0–0	0–2	0–2
2004–05	Hammarby IF	2QR	(Iceland) ÍA	2–0	2–1	4–1
2004–05	Hammarby IF	1R	(Spain) Villarreal	1–2	0–3	1–5
2004–05	Östers IF	1QR	(Wales) Total Network Solutions	2–0	2–1	4–1
2004–05	Östers IF	2QR	(Latvia) Liepājas Metalurgs	2–2	1–1	3–3 (a)
2005–06	Djurgårdens IF	2QR	(Republic of Ireland) Cork City	1–1	0–0	1–1 (a)
2005–06	Halmstads BK	2QR	(Northern Ireland) Linfield	1–1	4–2	5–3
2005–06	Halmstads BK	1R	(Portugal) Sporting CP	1–2	3–2 (a.e.t.)	4–4 (a)
2005–06	Halmstads BK	GS	(Germany) Hertha BSC	0–1	—N/a	5th
2005–06	Halmstads BK	GS	(France) Lens	—N/a	0–5	5th
2005–06	Halmstads BK	GS	(Italy) Sampdoria	1–3	—N/a	5th
2005–06	Halmstads BK	GS	(Romania) Steaua București	—N/a	0–3	5th
2005–06	Malmö FF	1R	(Turkey) Beşiktaş	1–4	1–0	2–4
2006–07	Åtvidabergs FF	1QR	(Luxembourg) Etzella Ettelbruck	4–0	3–0	7–0
2006–07	Åtvidabergs FF	2QR	(Norway) Brann	1–1	3–3	4–4 (a)
2006–07	Åtvidabergs FF	1R	(Switzerland) Grasshoppers	0–3	0–5	0–8
2006–07	Gefle IF	1QR	(Wales) Llanelli Town	1–2	0–0	1–2
2006–07	IFK Göteborg	1QR	(Republic of Ireland) Derry City	0–1	0–1	0–2
2007–08	AIK	1QR	(Northern Ireland) Glentoran	4–0	5–0	9–0
2007–08	AIK	2QR	(Latvia) Liepājas Metalurgs	2–0	2–3	4–3
2007–08	AIK	1R	(Israel) Hapoel Tel Aviv	0–1	0–0	0–1
2007–08	IF Elfsborg	1R	(Romania) Dinamo București	0–1	2–1	2–2 (a)
2007–08	IF Elfsborg	GS	(Greece) AEK Athens	1–1	—N/a	5th
2007–08	IF Elfsborg	GS	(Italy) Fiorentina	—N/a	1–6	5th
2007–08	IF Elfsborg	GS	(Czech Republic) Mladá Boleslav	1–3	—N/a	5th
2007–08	IF Elfsborg	GS	(Spain) Villarreal	—N/a	0–2	5th
2007–08	BK Häcken	1QR	(Iceland) KR	1–1	1–0	2–1
2007–08	BK Häcken	2QR	(Scotland) Dunfermline Athletic	1–0	1–1	2–1
2007–08	BK Häcken	1R	(Russia) Spartak Moscow	1–3	0–5	1–8
2007–08	Hammarby IF	2QR	(Norway) Fredrikstad	2–1	1–1	3–2
2007–08	Hammarby IF	1R	(Portugal) Braga	2–1	0–4	2–5
2007–08	Helsingborgs IF	1QR	(Estonia) Narva Trans	6–0	3–0	9–0
2007–08	Helsingborgs IF	2QR	(Republic of Ireland) Drogheda United	3–0	1–1	4–1
2007–08	Helsingborgs IF	1R	(Netherlands) Heerenveen	5–1	3–5	8–6
2007–08	Helsingborgs IF	GS	(Greece) Panionios	1–1	—N/a	3rd
2007–08	Helsingborgs IF	GS	(Turkey) Galatasaray	—N/a	3–2	3rd
2007–08	Helsingborgs IF	GS	Austria Wien	3–0	—N/a	3rd
2007–08	Helsingborgs IF	GS	(France) Bordeaux	—N/a	1–2	3rd
2007–08	Helsingborgs IF	R32	(Netherlands) PSV	1–2	0–2	1–4
2008–09	Djurgårdens IF	1QR	(Estonia) Flora	0–0	2–2	2–2 (a)
2008–09	Djurgårdens IF	2QR	(Norway) Rosenborg	2–1	0–5	2–6
2008–09	IF Elfsborg	2QR	(Republic of Ireland) St Patrick's Athletic	2–2	1–2	3–4
2008–09	Kalmar FF	1QR	(Luxembourg) Racing	7–1	3–0	10–1
2008–09	Kalmar FF	2QR	(Belgium) Gent	4–0	2–1	6–1
2008–09	Kalmar FF	1R	(Netherlands) Feyenoord	1–2	1–0	2–2 (a)
UEFA Europa League
2009–10	IF Elfsborg	2QR	(Hungary) Szombathelyi Haladás	3–0	0–0	3–0
2009–10	IF Elfsborg	3QR	(Portugal) Braga	2–0	2–1	4–1
2009–10	IF Elfsborg	PO	(Italy) Lazio	1–0	0–3	1–3
2009–10	Helsingborgs IF	1QR	(Armenia) Mika	3–1	1–1	4–2
2009–10	Helsingborgs IF	2QR	(Georgia (country)) Zestaponi	2–2 (a.e.t.)	2–1	4–3
2009–10	Helsingborgs IF	3QR	(Bosnia and Herzegovina) Sarajevo	2–1	1–2	3–3 (4–5 p)
2009–10	IFK Göteborg	3QR	(Israel) Hapoel Tel Aviv	1–3	1–1	2–4
2010–11	AIK	PO	(Bulgaria) Levski Sofia	0–0	1–2	1–2
2010–11	IF Elfsborg	2QR	(Moldova) Iskra-Stal	2–1	1–0	3–1
2010–11	IF Elfsborg	3QR	(North Macedonia) Teteks	5–0	2–1	7–1
2010–11	IF Elfsborg	PO	(Italy) Napoli	0–2	0–1	0–3
2010–11	Gefle IF	1QR	(Faroe Islands) NSÍ Runavík	2–1	2–0	4–1
2010–11	Gefle IF	2QR	(Georgia (country)) Dinamo Tbilisi	1–2	1–2	2–4
2010–11	IFK Göteborg	3QR	(Netherlands) AZ	1–0	0–2	1–2
2010–11	Kalmar FF	1QR	(Faroe Islands) EB/Streymur	1–0	3–0	4–0
2010–11	Kalmar FF	2QR	(Moldova) Dacia Chișinău	0–0	2–0	2–0
2010–11	Kalmar FF	3QR	(Bulgaria) Levski Sofia	1–1	2–5	3–6
2011–12	IF Elfsborg	1QR	(Luxembourg) Fola Esch	4–0	1–1	5–1
2011–12	IF Elfsborg	2QR	(Lithuania) Sūduva Marijampolė	3–0	1–1	4–1
2011–12	IF Elfsborg	3QR	(Norway) Aalesund	1–1	0–4	1–5
2011–12	BK Häcken	1QR	(Luxembourg) UN Käerjéng 97	5–1	1–1	6–2
2011–12	BK Häcken	2QR	(Finland) Honka	1–0	2–0	3–0
2011–12	BK Häcken	3QR	(Portugal) Nacional	2–1	0–3	2–4
2011–12	Helsingborgs IF	3QR	(Israel) Bnei Yehuda	3–0	0–1	3–1
2011–12	Helsingborgs IF	PO	(Belgium) Standard Liège	1–3	0–1	1–4
2011–12	Örebro SK	2QR	(Bosnia and Herzegovina) Sarajevo	0–0	0–2	0–2
2011–12	Malmö FF	GS	Austria Wien	1–2	0–2	4th
2011–12	Malmö FF	GS	(Netherlands) AZ	0–0	1–4	4th
2011–12	Malmö FF	GS	(Ukraine) Metalist Kharkiv	1–4	1–3	4th
2012–13	AIK	2QR	(Iceland) FH	1–1	1–0	2–1
2012–13	AIK	3QR	(Poland) Lech Poznań	3–0	0–1	3–1
2012–13	AIK	PO	(Russia) CSKA Moscow	0–1	2–0	2–1
2012–13	AIK	GS	(Ukraine) Dnipro Dnipropetrovsk	2–3	0–4	4th
2012–13	AIK	GS	(Italy) Napoli	1–2	0–4	4th
2012–13	AIK	GS	(Netherlands) PSV	1–0	1–1	4th
2012–13	IF Elfsborg	1QR	(Malta) Floriana	8–0	4–0	12–0
2012–13	IF Elfsborg	2QR	(Moldova) Dacia Chișinău	2–0	0–1	2–1
2012–13	IF Elfsborg	3QR	(Denmark) Horsens	2–3	1–1	3–4
2012–13	Helsingborgs IF	GS	(Germany) Hannover 96	1–2	2–3	3rd
2012–13	Helsingborgs IF	GS	(Spain) Levante	1–3	0–1	3rd
2012–13	Helsingborgs IF	GS	(Netherlands) Twente	2–2	3–1	3rd
2012–13	Kalmar FF	1QR	(Northern Ireland) Cliftonville	4–0	0–1	4–1
2012–13	Kalmar FF	2QR	(Croatia) Osijek	3–0	3–1	6–1
2012–13	Kalmar FF	3QR	(Switzerland) Young Boys	1–0	0–3	1–3
2013–14	IF Elfsborg	PO	(Denmark) Nordsjælland	1–1	1–0	2–1
2013–14	IF Elfsborg	GS	(Denmark) Esbjerg	1–2	0–1	3rd
2013–14	IF Elfsborg	GS	(Belgium) Standard Liège	1–1	3–1	3rd
2013–14	IF Elfsborg	GS	(Austria) Red Bull Salzburg	0–1	0–4	3rd
2013–14	Gefle IF	1QR	(Estonia) Narva Trans	5–1	3–0	8–1
2013–14	Gefle IF	2QR	(Cyprus) Anorthosis Famagusta	4–0	0–3	4–3
2013–14	Gefle IF	3QR	(Azerbaijan) Qarabağ	0–2	0–1	0–3
2013–14	IFK Göteborg	2QR	(Slovakia) Trenčín	0–0	1–2	1–2
2013–14	BK Häcken	2QR	(Czech Republic) Sparta Prague	1–0	2–2	3–2
2013–14	BK Häcken	3QR	(Switzerland) Thun	1–2	0–1	1–3
2013–14	Malmö FF	1QR	(Republic of Ireland) Drogheda United	2–0	0–0	2–0
2013–14	Malmö FF	2QR	(Scotland) Hibernian	2–0	7–0	9–0
2013–14	Malmö FF	3QR	(Wales) Swansea City	0–0	0–4	0–4
2014–15	AIK	2QR	(Northern Ireland) Linfield	2–0	0–1	2–1
2014–15	AIK	3QR	(Kazakhstan) Astana	0–3	1–1	1–4
2014–15	IF Brommapojkarna	1QR	(Finland) VPS	2–0	1–2	3–2
2014–15	IF Brommapojkarna	2QR	(Northern Ireland) Crusaders	4–0	1–1	5–1
2014–15	IF Brommapojkarna	3QR	(Italy) Torino	0–3	0–4	0–7
2014–15	IF Elfsborg	2QR	(Azerbaijan) Inter Baku	1–0	0–1	1–1 (4–3 p)
2014–15	IF Elfsborg	3QR	(Iceland) FH	4–1	1–2	5–3
2014–15	IF Elfsborg	PO	(Portugal) Rio Ave	2–1	0–1	2–2 (a)
2014–15	IFK Göteborg	1QR	(Luxembourg) Fola Esch	0–0	2–0	2–0
2014–15	IFK Göteborg	2QR	(Hungary) Győr	0–1	3–0	3–1
2014–15	IFK Göteborg	3QR	(Portugal) Rio Ave	0–1	0–0	0–1
2015–16	AIK	1QR	(Finland) VPS	4–0	2–2	6–2
2015–16	AIK	2QR	(Armenia) Shirak	2–0	2–0	4–0
2015–16	AIK	3QR	(Greece) Atromitos	1–3	0–1	1–4
2015–16	IF Elfsborg	1QR	(Finland) Lahti	5–0	2–2	7–2
2015–16	IF Elfsborg	2QR	(Denmark) Randers	1–0 (a.e.t.)	0–0	1–0
2015–16	IF Elfsborg	3QR	(Norway) Odd	2–1	0–2	2–3
2015–16	IFK Göteborg	2QR	(Poland) Śląsk Wrocław	2–0	0–0	2–0
2015–16	IFK Göteborg	3QR	(Portugal) Belenenses	0–0	1–2	1–2
2016–17	AIK	1QR	(Wales) Bala Town	2–0	2–0	4–0
2016–17	AIK	2QR	(Gibraltar) Europa	1–0	1–0	2–0
2016–17	AIK	3QR	(Greece) Panathinaikos	0–2	0–1	0–3
2016–17	IFK Göteborg	1QR	(Wales) Llandudno	5–0	2–1	7–1
2016–17	IFK Göteborg	2QR	(Poland) Piast Gliwice	0–0	3–0	3–0
2016–17	IFK Göteborg	3QR	(Finland) HJK	1–2	2–0	3–2
2016–17	IFK Göteborg	PO	(Azerbaijan) Qarabağ	1–0	0–3	1–3
2016–17	BK Häcken	2QR	(Republic of Ireland) Cork City	1–1	0–1	1–2
2017–18	AIK	1QR	(Faroe Islands) KÍ	5–0	0–0	5–0
2017–18	AIK	2QR	(Bosnia and Herzegovina) Željezničar Sarajevo	2–0	0–0	2–0
2017–18	AIK	3QR	(Portugal) Braga	1–1	1–2 (a.e.t.)	2–3
2017–18	IFK Norrköping	1QR	(Kosovo) Prishtina	5–0	1–0	6–0
2017–18	IFK Norrköping	2QR	(Lithuania) Riteriai	2–1	1–2 (a.e.t.)	3–3 (3–5 p)
2017–18	Östersunds FK	2QR	(Turkey) Galatasaray	2–0	1–1	3–1
2017–18	Östersunds FK	3QR	(Luxembourg) Fola Esch	1–0	2–1	3–1
2017–18	Östersunds FK	PO	(Greece) PAOK	2–0	1–3	3–3 (a)
2017–18	Östersunds FK	GS	(Spain) Athletic Bilbao	2–2	0–1	2nd
2017–18	Östersunds FK	GS	(Ukraine) Zorya Luhansk	2–0	2–0	2nd
2017–18	Östersunds FK	GS	(Germany) Hertha BSC	1–0	1–1	2nd
2017–18	Östersunds FK	R32	(England) Arsenal	0–3	2–1	2–4
2018–19	AIK	1QR	(Republic of Ireland) Shamrock Rovers	1–1 (a.e.t.)	1–0	2–1
2018–19	AIK	2QR	(Denmark) Nordsjælland	0–1	0–1	0–2
2018–19	Djurgårdens IF	2QR	(Ukraine) Mariupol	1–1	1–2 (a.e.t.)	2–3
2018–19	BK Häcken	1QR	(Latvia) Liepāja	1–2	3–0	4–2
2018–19	BK Häcken	2QR	(Germany) RB Leipzig	1–1	0–4	1–5
2018–19	Malmö FF	PO	(Denmark) Midtjylland	2–2	2–0	4–2
2018–19	Malmö FF	GS	(Belgium) Genk	2–2	0–2	2nd
2018–19	Malmö FF	GS	(Turkey) Beşiktaş	2–0	1–0	2nd
2018–19	Malmö FF	GS	(Norway) Sarpsborg 08	1–1	1–1	2nd
2018–19	Malmö FF	R32	(England) Chelsea	1–2	0–3	1–5
2019–20	AIK	3QR	(Moldova) Sheriff Tiraspol	1–1	2–1	3–2
2019–20	AIK	PO	(Scotland) Celtic	1–4	0–2	1–6
2019–20	BK Häcken	2QR	(Netherlands) AZ	0–3	0–0	0–3
2019–20	Malmö FF	1QR	(Northern Ireland) Ballymena United	7–0	4–0	11–0
2019–20	Malmö FF	2QR	(Slovenia) Domžale	2–2	3–2	5–4
2019–20	Malmö FF	3QR	(Bosnia and Herzegovina) Zrinjski Mostar	3–0	0–1	3–1
2019–20	Malmö FF	PO	(Israel) Bnei Yehuda	3–0	1–0	4–0
2019–20	Malmö FF	GS	(Denmark) Copenhagen	1–1	0–1	1st
2019–20	Malmö FF	GS	(Ukraine) Dynamo Kyiv	4–3	0–1	1st
2019–20	Malmö FF	GS	(Switzerland) Lugano	2–1	0–0	1st
2019–20	Malmö FF	R32	(Germany) Wolfsburg	0–3	1–2	1–5
2019–20	IFK Norrköping	1QR	(Republic of Ireland) St Patrick's Athletic	2–1	2–0	4–1
2019–20	IFK Norrköping	2QR	(Latvia) Liepāja	2–0	1–0	3–0
2019–20	IFK Norrköping	3QR	(Israel) Hapoel Be'er Sheva	1–1	1–3	2–4
2020–21	Djurgårdens IF	2QR	(Gibraltar) Europa	2–1		
2020–21	Djurgårdens IF	3QR	(Romania) CFR Cluj	0–1		
2020–21	IFK Göteborg	2QR	(Denmark) Copenhagen	1–2		
2020–21	Hammarby IF	1QR	(Hungary) Puskás Akadémia	3–0		
2020–21	Hammarby IF	2QR	(Poland) Lech Poznań	0–3		
2020–21	Malmö FF	1QR	(Poland) Cracovia	2–0		
2020–21	Malmö FF	2QR	(Hungary) Budapest Honvéd	2–0		
2020–21	Malmö FF	3QR	(Croatia) Lokomotiva	5–0		
2020–21	Malmö FF	PO	(Spain) Granada	1–3		
2022–23	Malmö FF	3QR	(Luxembourg) F91 Dudelange	3–0	2–2	5–2
2022–23	Malmö FF	PO	(Turkey) Sivasspor	3–1	2–0	5–1
2022–23	Malmö FF	GS	(Portugal) Braga	0–2	1–2	4th
2022–23	Malmö FF	GS	(Germany) Union Berlin	0–1	0–1	4th
2022–23	Malmö FF	GS	(Belgium) Union Saint-Gilloise	0–2	2–3	4th
2023–24	BK Häcken	3QR	(Lithuania) Žalgiris	5–0	3–1	8–1
2023–24	BK Häcken	PO	(Scotland) Aberdeen	2–2	3–1	5–3
2023–24	BK Häcken	LP	(Germany) Bayer Leverkusen	0–2	0–4	4th
2023–24	BK Häcken	LP	(Azerbaijan) Qarabağ	0–1	1–2	4th
2023–24	BK Häcken	LP	(Norway) Molde	1–3	1–5	4th
2024–25	IF Elfsborg	1QR	(Cyprus) Pafos	3–0	5–2	8–2
2024–25	IF Elfsborg	2QR	(Moldova) Sheriff Tiraspol	2–0	1–0	3–0
2024–25	IF Elfsborg	3QR	(Croatia) Rijeka	2–0	1–1	3–1
2024–25	IF Elfsborg	PO	(Norway) Molde	0–1	1–0	1–1 (4–2 p)
2024–25	IF Elfsborg	LP	(Netherlands) AZ	—N/a	2–3	26th
2024–25	IF Elfsborg	LP	(Italy) Roma	1–0	—N/a	26th
2024–25	IF Elfsborg	LP	(Turkey) Galatasaray	—N/a	3–4	26th
2024–25	IF Elfsborg	LP	(Portugal) Braga	1–1	—N/a	26th
2024–25	IF Elfsborg	LP	(Spain) Athletic Bilbao	—N/a	0–3	26th
2024–25	IF Elfsborg	LP	(Azerbaijan) Qarabağ	1–0	—N/a	26th
2024–25	IF Elfsborg	LP	(France) Nice	1–0	—N/a	26th
2024–25	IF Elfsborg	LP	(England) Tottenham Hotspur	—N/a	0–3	26th
2024–25	Malmö FF	LP	(Scotland) Rangers	0–2	—N/a	31st
2024–25	Malmö FF	LP	(Azerbaijan) Qarabağ	—N/a	2–1	31st
2024–25	Malmö FF	LP	(Greece) Olympiacos	0–1	—N/a	31st
2024–25	Malmö FF	LP	(Turkey) Beşiktaş	—N/a	1–2	31st
2024–25	Malmö FF	LP	(Hungary) Ferencváros	—N/a	1–4	31st
2024–25	Malmö FF	LP	(Turkey) Galatasaray	2–2	—N/a	31st
2024–25	Malmö FF	LP	(Netherlands) Twente	2–3	—N/a	31st
2024–25	Malmö FF	LP	(Czech Republic) Slavia Prague	—N/a	2–2	31st
2025–26	BK Häcken	1QR	(Slovakia) Spartak Trnava	2–2	1–0	3–2
2025–26	BK Häcken	2QR	(Belgium) Anderlecht	2–1	0–1	2–2 (4–2 p)
2025–26	BK Häcken	3QR	(Norway) Brann	0–2	1–0	1–2
2025–26	Malmö FF	PO	(Czech Republic) Sigma Olomouc	3–0	2–0	5–0
2025–26	Malmö FF	LP	(Bulgaria) Ludogorets Razgrad	1–2	—N/a	35th
2025–26	Malmö FF	LP	(Czech Republic) Viktoria Plzeň	—N/a	0–3	35th
2025–26	Malmö FF	LP	(Croatia) Dinamo Zagreb	1–1	—N/a	35th
2025–26	Malmö FF	LP	(Greece) Panathinaikos	0–1	—N/a	35th
2025–26	Malmö FF	LP	(England) Nottingham Forest	—N/a	0–3	35th
2025–26	Malmö FF	LP	(Portugal) Porto	—N/a	1–2	35th
2025–26	Malmö FF	LP	(Serbia) Red Star Belgrade	0–1	—N/a	35th
2025–26	Malmö FF	LP	(Belgium) Genk	—N/a	1–2	35th
2026–27	Hammarby IF	2QR	(Belgium) Anderlecht	1–1	1–3	2–4
2026–27	Mjällby AIF	PO	(Austria) Red Bull Salzburg	0–1	0–3	0–4

=== UEFA Conference League ===
IF Elfsborg, BK Häcken, and Hammarby IF became the first Swedish teams to enter the UEFA Europa Conference League in its inaugural edition in 2021–22. Djurgårdens IF reached the semi-finals in the 2024–25 edition. They also reached the round of 16 in the 2022–23 edition.

These are the appearances of Swedish football clubs in the UEFA Europa Conference League and the UEFA Conference League:

Season	Club	Round	Opponent	Home	Away	Agg
UEFA Europa Conference League
2021–22	IF Elfsborg	2QR	(Moldova) Milsami Orhei	4–0	5–0	9–0
2021–22	IF Elfsborg	3QR	(Bosnia and Herzegovina) Velež Mostar	1–1	4–1	5–2
2021–22	IF Elfsborg	PO	(Netherlands) Feyenoord	3–1	0–5	3–6
2021–22	BK Häcken	2QR	(Scotland) Aberdeen	2–0	1–5	3–5
2021–22	Hammarby IF	2QR	(Slovenia) Maribor	3–1	1–0	4–1
2021–22	Hammarby IF	3QR	(Serbia) Čukarički	5–1	1–3	6–4
2021–22	Hammarby IF	PO	(Switzerland) Basel	1–3	3–1	4–4 (3–4 p)
2022–23	AIK	2QR	(Ukraine) Vorskla Poltava	2–0 (a.e.t.)	2–3	4–3
2022–23	AIK	3QR	(North Macedonia) Shkëndija	1–1	1–1	2–2 (3–2 p)
2022–23	AIK	PO	(Czech Republic) Slovácko	0–1	0–3	0–4
2022–23	Djurgårdens IF	2QR	(Croatia) Rijeka	2–0	2–1	4–1
2022–23	Djurgårdens IF	3QR	(Romania) Sepsi Sfântu Gheorghe	3–1	3–1	6–2
2022–23	Djurgårdens IF	PO	(Cyprus) APOEL	3–0	2–3	5–3
2022–23	Djurgårdens IF	GS	(Belgium) Gent	4–2	1–0	1st
2022–23	Djurgårdens IF	GS	(Norway) Molde	3–2	3–2	1st
2022–23	Djurgårdens IF	GS	(Republic of Ireland) Shamrock Rovers	1–0	0–0	1st
2022–23	Djurgårdens IF	R16	(Poland) Lech Poznań	0–3	0–2	0–5
2022–23	IF Elfsborg	2QR	(Norway) Molde	1–2	1–4	2–6
2023–24	Djurgårdens IF	2QR	(Switzerland) Luzern	1–2	1–1	2–3
2023–24	Hammarby IF	2QR	(Netherlands) Twente	1–1 (a.e.t.)	0–1	1–2
2023–24	Kalmar FF	2QR	(Armenia) Pyunik	1–2	1–2	2–4
UEFA Conference League
2024–25	Djurgårdens IF	2QR	(Luxembourg) Progrès Niederkorn	3–0	0–1	3–1
2024–25	Djurgårdens IF	3QR	(Finland) Ilves	3–1	1–1	4–2
2024–25	Djurgårdens IF	PO	(Slovenia) Maribor	1–0	1–0	2–0
2024–25	Djurgårdens IF	LP	(Austria) LASK	—N/a	2–2	5th
2024–25	Djurgårdens IF	LP	(Portugal) Vitória de Guimarães	1–2	—N/a	5th
2024–25	Djurgårdens IF	LP	(Greece) Panathinaikos	2–1	—N/a	5th
2024–25	Djurgårdens IF	LP	(Wales) The New Saints	—N/a	1–0	5th
2024–25	Djurgårdens IF	LP	(Iceland) Víkingur Reykjavík	—N/a	2–1	5th
2024–25	Djurgårdens IF	LP	(Poland) Legia Warsaw	3–1	—N/a	5th
2024–25	Djurgårdens IF	R16	(Cyprus) Pafos	3–0	0–1	3–1
2024–25	Djurgårdens IF	QF	(Austria) Rapid Wien	0–1	4–1 (a.e.t.)	4–2
2024–25	Djurgårdens IF	SF	(England) Chelsea	1–4	0–1	1–5
2024–25	BK Häcken	2QR	(Luxembourg) F91 Dudelange	6–1	6–2	12–3
2024–25	BK Häcken	3QR	(Estonia) Paide Linnameeskond	6–1	1–1	7–2
2024–25	BK Häcken	PO	(Germany) 1. FC Heidenheim	1–2	2–3	3–5
2025–26	AIK	2QR	(Estonia) Paide Linnameeskond	6–0	2–0	8–0
2025–26	AIK	3QR	(Hungary) Győri ETO	2–1	0–2	2–3
2025–26	BK Häcken	PO	(Romania) CFR Cluj	7–2	0–1	7–3
2025–26	BK Häcken	LP	(Republic of Ireland) Shelbourne	—N/a	0–0	32nd
2025–26	BK Häcken	LP	(Spain) Rayo Vallecano	2–2	—N/a	32nd
2025–26	BK Häcken	LP	(France) Strasbourg	1–2	—N/a	32nd
2025–26	BK Häcken	LP	(Bosnia and Herzegovina) Zrinjski Mostar	—N/a	1–2	32nd
2025–26	BK Häcken	LP	(Cyprus) AEK Larnaca	1–1	—N/a	32nd
2025–26	BK Häcken	LP	(Slovakia) Slovan Bratislava	—N/a	0–1	32nd
2025–26	Hammarby IF	2QR	(Belgium) Charleroi	0–0	2–1 (a.e.t.)	2–1
2025–26	Hammarby IF	3QR	(Norway) Rosenborg	0–1	0–0	0–1
2026–27	GAIS	2QR	(Denmark) Nordsjælland	1–0	0–6	1–6
2026–27	Hammarby IF	3QR	(Poland) Raków Częstochowa	0–1	0–0	0–1
2026–27	IFK Göteborg	2QR	(Estonia) FCI Levadia	1–2	3–1 (a.e.t.)	4–3
2026–27	IFK Göteborg	3QR	(Belgium) Gent	0–1	1–1	1–2

== Defunct competitions ==
=== UEFA Cup Winners' Cup ===
Svenska cupen was on hiatus before the 1967 edition. IFK Norrköping became the first Swedish entrant in the European Cup Winners' Cup, by contesting in the 1968–69 edition. Swedish teams reached the quarter-finals on four occasions: Åtvidabergs FF, against Dynamo Berlin in the 1971–72 edition; Malmö FF, against Ferencváros in the 1971–72 edition; IFK Göteborg, against Arsenal in the 1971–72 edition; and AIK, against Barcelona in the 1996–97 edition.

These are the appearances of Swedish football clubs in the European Cup Winners' Cup and the UEFA Cup Winners' Cup:

Season	Club	Round	Opponent	Home	Away	Agg
European Cup Winners' Cup
1960–61	None entered					
1961–62	None entered					
1962–63	None entered					
1963–64	None entered					
1964–65	None entered					
1965–66	None entered					
1966–67	None entered					
1967–68	None entered					
1968–69	IFK Norrköping	1R	(Northern Ireland) Crusaders	4–1	2–2	6–3
1968–69	IFK Norrköping	2R	(Norway) Lyn	3–2	0–2	3–4
1969–70	IFK Norrköping	1R	(Malta) Sliema Wanderers	5–1	0–1	5–2
1969–70	IFK Norrköping	2R	(West Germany) Schalke 04	0–0	0–1	0–1
1970–71	Åtvidabergs FF	PR	(Albania) Partizani Tirana	1–1	0–2	1–3
1971–72	Åtvidabergs FF	1R	(Poland) Zagłębie Sosnowiec	1–1	4–3	5–4
1971–72	Åtvidabergs FF	2R	(England) Chelsea	0–0	1–1	1–1 (a)
1971–72	Åtvidabergs FF	QF	(East Germany) Dynamo Berlin	0–2	2–2	2–4
1972–73	Landskrona BoIS	1R	(Romania) Rapid București	1–0	0–3	1–3
1973–74	Malmö FF	1R	(Cyprus) Pezoporikos Larnaca	11–0	0–0	11–0
1973–74	Malmö FF	2R	(Switzerland) Zürich	1–1	0–0	1–1 (a)
1974–75	Malmö FF	1R	(Switzerland) Sion	1–0	0–1	1–1 (4–5 p)
1974–75	Malmö FF	2R	(Finland) Reipas Lahti	3–1	0–0	3–1
1974–75	Malmö FF	QF	(Hungary) Ferencváros	1–3	1–1	2–4
1975–76	Djurgårdens IF	1R	(Wales) Wrexham	1–1	1–2	2–3
1976–77	AIK	1R	(Turkey) Galatasaray	1–2	1–1	2–3
1977–78	Östers IF	1R	(Czechoslovakia) Lokomotiva Kosice	2–2	0–0	2–2 (a)
1978–79	Kalmar FF	1R	(Hungary) Ferencváros	2–2	0–2	2–4
1979–80	IFK Göteborg	1R	(Republic of Ireland) Waterford	1–0	1–1	2–1
1979–80	IFK Göteborg	2R	(Greece) Panionios	2–0	0–1	2–1
1979–80	IFK Göteborg	QF	(England) Arsenal	0–0	1–5	1–5
1980–81	Malmö FF	1R	(Albania) Partizani Tirana	1–0	0–0	1–0
1980–81	Malmö FF	2R	(Portugal) Benfica	1–0	0–2	1–2
1981–82	Kalmar FF	1R	(Switzerland) Lausanne-Sport	3–2	1–2	4–4
1982–83	IFK Göteborg	1R	(Hungary) Újpesti Dózsa	1–1	1–3	2–4
1983–84	Hammarby IF	1R	(Albania) 17 Nëntori Tirana	4–0	1–2	5–2
1983–84	Hammarby IF	2R	(Finland) Haka	1–1	1–2 (a.e.t.)	2–3
1984–85	Malmö FF	1R	(East Germany) Dynamo Dresden	2–0	1–4	3–4
1985–86	AIK	1R	(Luxembourg) Red Boys Differdange	8–0	5–0	13–0
1985–86	AIK	2R	(Czechoslovakia) Dukla Prague	2–2	0–1	2–3
1986–87	Malmö FF	1R	(Cyprus) Apollon Limassol	6–0	1–2	7–2
1986–87	Malmö FF	2R	(Albania) 17 Nëntori Tirana	0–0	3–0	3–0
1986–87	Malmö FF	3R	(Netherlands) Ajax	1–0	1–3	2–3
1987–88	Kalmar FF	1R	(Iceland) ÍA	1–0 (a.e.t.)	0–0	1–0
1987–88	Kalmar FF	2R	(Portugal) Sporting CP	1–0	0–5	1–5
1988–89	IFK Norrköping	1R	(Italy) Sampdoria	2–1	0–2	2–3
1989–90	Djurgårdens IF	1R	Union Luxembourg	5–0	0–0	5–0
1989–90	Djurgårdens IF	2R	(Spain) Real Valladolid	2–2	0–2	2–4
1990–91	Djurgårdens IF	1R	(Iceland) Fram	1–1	0–3	1–4
1991–92	IFK Norrköping	1R	(Luxembourg) Jeunesse d'Esch	4–0	2–1	6–1
1991–92	IFK Norrköping	2R	(France) Monaco	1–2	0–1	1–3
1992–93	AIK	1R	(Denmark) AGF	3–3	1–1	4–4 (a)
1993–94	Degerfors IF	QR	(Malta) Sliema Wanderers	3–0	3–1	6–1
1993–94	Degerfors IF	1R	(Italy) Parma	1–2	0–2	1–4
UEFA Cup Winners' Cup
1994–95	IFK Norrköping	QR	(Czech Republic) Viktoria Žižkov	3–3	0–1	3–4
1995–96	Halmstads BK	1R	(Bulgaria) Lokomotiv Sofia	2–0	1–3	3–3 (a)
1995–96	Halmstads BK	2R	(Italy) Parma	3–0	0–4	3–4
1996–97	AIK	1R	(Iceland) KR	1–1	1–0	2–1
1996–97	AIK	2R	(France) Nîmes	0–1	3–1	3–2
1996–97	AIK	QF	(Spain) Barcelona	1–1	1–3	2–4
1997–98	AIK	1R	(Slovenia) Primorje	0–1	1–1 (a.e.t.)	1–2
1998–99	Helsingborgs IF	QR	(Liechtenstein) Vaduz	3–0	2–0	5–0
1998–99	Helsingborgs IF	1R	(England) Chelsea	0–0	0–1	0–1

=== UEFA Intertoto Cup ===
These are the appearances of Swedish football clubs in the UEFA Intertoto Cup:

Season	Club	Round	Opponent	Home	Away	Agg
1995	IFK Norrköping	GS	(Republic of Ireland) Bohemians	5–0	—N/a	4th
1995	IFK Norrköping	GS	(France) Bordeaux	—N/a	2–6	4th
1995	IFK Norrköping	GS	(Finland) HJK	1–1	—N/a	4th
1995	IFK Norrköping	GS	(Denmark) OB	—N/a	2–3	4th
1995	Östers IF	GS	(Germany) 1. FC Köln	0–0	—N/a	3rd
1995	Östers IF	GS	(Switzerland) Lucerne	—N/a	2–3	3rd
1995	Östers IF	GS	(Slovenia) Rudar Velenje	3–1	—N/a	3rd
1995	Östers IF	GS	(England) Tottenham Hotspur	—N/a	2–1	3rd
1996	Djurgårdens IF	GS	(Cyprus) Apollon Limassol	8–0	—N/a	3rd
1996	Djurgårdens IF	GS	(Faroe Islands) B68 Toftir	5–1	—N/a	3rd
1996	Djurgårdens IF	GS	(Austria) LASK	—N/a	0–2	3rd
1996	Djurgårdens IF	GS	(Germany) Werder Bremen	—N/a	2–3	3rd
1996	Örebro SK	GS	Austria Wien	—N/a	3–2	1st
1996	Örebro SK	GS	(Denmark) Copenhagen	—N/a	2–2	1st
1996	Örebro SK	GS	(Iceland) Keflavík	3–1	—N/a	1st
1996	Örebro SK	GS	(Slovenia) Maribor	4–1	—N/a	1st
1996	Örebro SK	SF	(Croatia) Segesta	4–1	0–4	4–5
1996	Örgryte IS	GS	(Israel) Hapoel Tel Aviv	3–0		2nd
1996	Örgryte IS	GS	(Croatia) Segesta	—N/a	1–1	2nd
1996	Örgryte IS	GS	(Switzerland) Lucerne	3–0	—N/a	2nd
1996	Örgryte IS	GS	(France) Rennes	—N/a	1–1	2nd
1997	Halmstads BK	GS	(Federal Republic of Yugoslavia) Hajduk Kula	—N/a	1–0	1st
1997	Halmstads BK	GS	(Norway) Kongsvinger	2–1	—N/a	1st
1997	Halmstads BK	GS	(Belgium) Lommel	—N/a	1–1	1st
1997	Halmstads BK	GS	(Finland) TPS	6–1	—N/a	1st
1997	Halmstads BK	SF	(Russia) Lokomotiv Nizhny Novgorod	1–0	0–0	1–0
1997	Halmstads BK	F	(France) Bastia	0–1	1–1	1–2
1997	Östers IF	GS	(Turkey) İstanbulspor	—N/a	2–3	4th
1997	Östers IF	GS	(Latvia) Universitāte Rīga	2–1	—N/a	4th
1997	Östers IF	GS	(Hungary) Vasas	1–4	—N/a	4th
1997	Östers IF	GS	(Germany) Werder Bremen	—N/a	1–2	4th
1998	Örebro SK	2R	(Serbia and Montenegro) Vojvodina	0–2	0–2	0–4
1998	Örgryte IS	1R	(Cyprus) Ethnikos Achna	4–0	1–2	5–2
1998	Örgryte IS	2R	(Poland) Ruch Chorzów	2–1	0–1	2–2 (a)
1999	Halmstads BK	1R	(Slovenia) Rudar Velenje	2–2	0–0	2–2 (a)
1999	Hammarby IF	2R	(Belarus) Gomel	4–0	2–2	6–2
1999	Hammarby IF	3R	(Netherlands) Heerenveen	0–2	0–2	0–4
2000	Västra Frölunda IF	1R	(Bosnia and Herzegovina) Zrinjski Mostar	1–0	1–2	2–2 (a)
2000	Västra Frölunda IF	2R	(North Macedonia) Pelister	0–0	1–3	1–3
2001	AIK	1R	(Wales) Carmarthen Town	3–0	0–0	3–0
2001	AIK	2R	(Denmark) OB	2–0	2–2	4–2
2001	AIK	3R	(France) Troyes	1–2	1–2	2–4
2002	Helsingborgs IF	1R	(Slovenia) Koper	1–0	0–0	1–0
2002	Helsingborgs IF	2R	(Czech Republic) Synot	2–0	0–4	2–4
2003	Örgryte IS	1R	(Lithuania) Žalgiris	3–0	1–1	4–1
2003	Örgryte IS	2R	(France) Nice	3–2	1–2	4–4 (a)
2004	Malmö FF	1R	(Republic of Ireland) Cork City	0–1	1–3	1–4
2005	IFK Göteborg	1R	(Luxembourg) Victoria Rosport	3–1	2–1	5–2
2005	IFK Göteborg	2R	(Hungary) Lombard-Pápa	1–0	3–2	4–2
2005	IFK Göteborg	3R	(Germany) Wolfsburg	0–2	0–2	0–4
2006	Kalmar FF	1R	(Estonia) Narva Trans	2–0	6–1	8–1
2006	Kalmar FF	2R	(Finland) Tampere United	3–2	2–1	5–3
2006	Kalmar FF	3R	(Netherlands) Twente	1–0	1–3	2–3
2007	Hammarby IF	1R	(Faroe Islands) KÍ	1–0	2–1	3–1
2007	Hammarby IF	2R	(Republic of Ireland) Cork City	1–0	1–1	2–1
2007	Hammarby IF	3R	(Netherlands) Utrecht	0–0	1–1	1–1 (a) (to UEFA Cup)
2008	IF Elfsborg	1R	(Faroe Islands) HB Tórshavn	0–0	4–1	4–1
2008	IF Elfsborg	2R	(Scotland) Hibernian	2–0	2–0	4–0
2008	IF Elfsborg	3R	(Latvia) FK Rīga	1–0	0–0	1–0 (to UEFA Cup)

== Non-UEFA competitions ==
=== Inter-Cities Fairs Cup ===
These are the appearances of Swedish football clubs in the Inter-Cities Fairs Cup:

Season	Club	Round	Opponent	Home	Away	Agg
1955–58	None entered					
1958–60	None entered					
1960–61	None entered					
1961–62	None entered					
1962–63	None entered					
1963–64	None entered					
1964–65	Djurgårdens IF	1R	(England) Manchester United	1–1	1–6	2–7
1964–65	Örgryte IS	1R	(Scotland) Dunfermline Athletic	0–0	2–4	2–4
1965–66	AIK	1R	(Belgium) Royal Daring Club de Bruxelles	3–1	0–0	3–1
1965–66	AIK	2R	(Switzerland) Servette	2–1	1–4	3–5
1965–66	Malmö FF	1R	(West Germany) 1860 Munich	0–3	0–4	0–7
1966–67	Djurgårdens IF	1R	(East Germany) Lokomotive Leipzig	1–3	1–2	2–5
1966–67	Örgryte IS	1R	(France) Nice	2–1	2–2	4–3
1966–67	Örgryte IS	2R	(Hungary) Ferencváros	0–0	1–7	1–7
1967–68	Malmö FF	1R	(England) Liverpool	0–2	1–2	1–4
1968–69	AIK	1R	(Norway) Skeid	2–1	1–1	3–2
1968–69	AIK	2R	(West Germany) Hannover 96	4–2	2–5	6–7
1969–70	Malmö FF	1R	(West Germany) VfB Stuttgart	1–1	0–3	1–4
1970–71	Malmö FF	1R	(Scotland) Hibernian	2–3	0–6	2–9
