= 1987 UEFA Cup final =

- Event: 1986–87 UEFA Cup
| IFK Göteborg | Dundee United |
| (Sweden) | (Scotland) |
| 2 | 1 |
- on aggregate

First leg
| IFK Göteborg | Dundee United |
| 1 | 0 |
- Date: 6 May 1987
- Venue: Ullevi, Gothenburg
- Referee: Siegfried Kirschen (East Germany)
- Attendance: 50,023

Second leg
| Dundee United | IFK Göteborg |
| 1 | 1 |
- Date: 20 May 1987
- Venue: Tannadice Park, Dundee
- Referee: Ioan Igna (Romania)
- Attendance: 20,911

The 1987 UEFA Cup Final was a football tie played on 6 and 20 May 1987 between IFK Göteborg of Sweden and Dundee United of Scotland. Göteborg won 2–1 on aggregate, their second UEFA Cup triumph, following victory in 1982. It was Dundee United's first, and so far only, major European final.

== Route to the final ==
| IFK Göteborg | | | | Round | Dundee United | | | |
|---|---|---|---|---|---|---|---|---|
| Opponent | Agg. | 1st leg | 2nd leg | | Opponent | Agg. | 1st leg | 2nd leg |
| (Czechoslovakia) Sigma Olomouc | 5–1 | 1–1 (A) | 4–0 (H) | First round | (France) Lens | 2–1 | 0–1 (A) | 2–0 (H) |
| (East Germany) Stahl Brandenburg | 3–1 | 2–0 (H) | 1–1 (A) | Second round | (Romania) Universitatea Craiova | 3–1 | 3–0 (H) | 0–1 (A) |
| (Belgium) Gent | 5–0 | 1–0 (A) | 4–0 (H) | Third round | (Socialist Federal Republic of Yugoslavia) Hajduk Split | 2–0 | 2–0 (H) | 0–0 (A) |
| (Italy) Internazionale | 1–1 (a) | 0–0 (H) | 1–1 (A) | Quarter-finals | (Spain) Barcelona | 3–1 | 1–0 (H) | 2–1 (A) |
| (Austria) Swarovski Tirol | 5–1 | 4–1 (H) | 1–0 (A) | Semi-finals | (West Germany) Borussia Mönchengladbach | 2–0 | 0–0 (H) | 2–0 (A) |

== Match details ==
=== First leg ===
6 May 1987

| IFK Göteborg (Sweden) | 1–0 | (Scotland) Dundee United |
|---|---|---|
| Pettersson 38' | Report Overview (archive) Overview |

Ullevi, Gothenburg
Attendance: 50,023
Referee: Siegfried Kirschen (East Germany)

| IFK Göteborg | Dundee United |

| GK | 1 | (Sweden) Thomas Wernerson |
| DF | 2 | (Sweden) Mats-Ola Carlsson |
| DF | 3 | (Sweden) Glenn Hysén (c) |
| DF | 4 | (Sweden) Peter Larsson |
| DF | 5 | (Sweden) Stig Fredriksson |
| MF | 6 | (Sweden) Magnus Johansson | (substituted off) 67' |
| MF | 7 | (Sweden) Tord Holmgren | (substituted off) 89' |
| MF | 8 | (Sweden) Michael Andersson |
| MF | 9 | (Sweden) Tommy Holmgren |
| FW | 10 | (Sweden) Stefan Pettersson |
| FW | 11 | (Sweden) Lennart Nilsson |
Substitutes:
| DF | 12 | (Sweden) Roland Nilsson | (substituted on) 67' |
| MF | 14 | (Sweden) Lars Zetterlund | (substituted on) 89' |
| MF | 15 | (Norway) Per Edmund Mordt |
| FW | 16 | (Finland) Jari Rantanen |
| GK | 13 | (Sweden) Ove Tobiasson |
Manager:
(Sweden) Gunder Bengtsson Man of the Match: Assistant referees:

| GK | 1 | (Scotland) Billy Thomson |
| DF | 2 | (Scotland) Maurice Malpas |
| DF | 3 | (Scotland) David Narey (c) |
| DF | 4 | (Scotland) Paul Hegarty | (substituted off) 54' |
| DF | 5 | (Scotland) John Holt |
| MF | 6 | (Scotland) Jim McInally |
| MF | 7 | (Scotland) Billy Kirkwood |
| MF | 8 | (Scotland) Dave Bowman |
| MF | 9 | (Scotland) Eamonn Bannon |
| FW | 10 | (Scotland) Paul Sturrock | (substituted off) 89' |
| FW | 11 | (Scotland) Ian Redford |
Substitutes:
| DF | 12 | (Scotland) John Clark | (substituted on) 54' |
| MF | 14 | (Scotland) Dave Beaumont | (substituted on) 89' |
Manager:
(Scotland) Jim McLean

=== Second leg ===
20 May 1987

| Dundee United (Scotland) | 1–1 | (Sweden) IFK Göteborg |
|---|---|---|
| Clark 60' | Report Overview (archive) Overview | L. Nilsson 22' |

Tannadice Park, Dundee
Attendance: 20,911
Referee: Ioan Igna (Romania)

| Dundee United | IFK Göteborg |

| GK | 1 | (Scotland) Billy Thomson |
| DF | 2 | (Scotland) Maurice Malpas |
| DF | 3 | (Scotland) John Clark |
| DF | 4 | (Scotland) David Narey (c) |
| DF | 5 | (Scotland) John Holt | (substituted off) 46' |
| MF | 6 | (Scotland) Jim McInally |
| MF | 7 | (Scotland) Iain Ferguson |
| MF | 8 | (Scotland) Billy Kirkwood |
| FW | 9 | (Scotland) Paul Sturrock |
| FW | 10 | (Scotland) Ian Redford | (substituted off) 71' |
| FW | 11 | (Scotland) Kevin Gallacher |
Substitutes:
| DF | 12 | (Scotland) Paul Hegarty | (substituted on) 46' |
| MF | 14 | (Scotland) Eamonn Bannon | (substituted on) 71' |
Manager:
(Scotland) Jim McLean Man of the Match: Assistant referees:

| GK | 1 | (Sweden) Thomas Wernersson |
| DF | 2 | (Sweden) Mats-Ola Carlsson |
| DF | 3 | (Sweden) Glenn Hysén (c) |
| DF | 4 | (Sweden) Peter Larsson |
| DF | 5 | (Sweden) Stig Fredriksson |
| MF | 6 | (Sweden) Roland Nilsson | (substituted off) 69' |
| MF | 7 | (Sweden) Tord Holmgren |
| MF | 8 | (Sweden) Michael Andersson |
| MF | 9 | (Sweden) Tommy Holmgren | (substituted off) 78' |
| FW | 10 | (Sweden) Stefan Pettersson |
| FW | 11 | (Sweden) Lennart Nilsson |
Substitutes:
| MF | 12 | (Sweden) Magnus Johansson | (substituted on) 69' |
| MF | 14 | (Norway) Per Edmund Mordt |
| MF | 15 | (Sweden) Lars Zetterlund | (substituted on) 78' |
| FW | 16 | (Finland) Jari Rantanen |
| GK | 13 | (Sweden) Ove Tobiasson |
Manager:
(Sweden) Gunder Bengtsson

== See also ==
- 1987 European Cup final
- 1987 European Cup Winners' Cup final
- Dundee United F.C. in European football
- IFK Göteborg in European football
- 1986–87 Dundee United F.C. season
