= Mats-Ola Carlsson =

Swedish footballer

Personal information
- Full name: Per Mats Ola Carlsson
- Date of birth: 28 January 1961 (age 65)
- Place of birth: Burseryd, Sweden
- Position: Right-back

Youth career
- Burseryds IF

Senior career*
Years	Team	Apps	(Gls)
1984–1986	Halmstads BK		
1986–1988	IFK Göteborg	40	(1)

International career
1985–1987	Sweden U21	10	(0)
- * Club domestic league appearances and goals

Per Mats Ola Carlsson (born 28 January 1961) is a Swedish former footballer who most notably played as a right-back for IFK Göteborg.

== Club career ==
Carlsson helped IFK Göteborg win the 1986–87 UEFA Cup, playing the full 180 minutes as a right-back in the two final games against Dundee United. He was also a part of the IFK Göteborg team that won the 1987 Swedish Championship title.

== International career ==
Carlsson played ten games for the Sweden U21 team between 1985 and 1987.

== Career statistics ==
=== Club ===
Appearances and goals by club, season and competition
Club	Season	Division	League		Svenska Cupen		Other (Note: Appearances in both UEFA competitions and the Allsvenskan play-offs)		Friendlies		Total	
Club	Season	Division	Apps	Goals	Apps	Goals	Apps	Goals	Apps	Goals	Apps	Goals
IFK Göteborg	1986	Allsvenskan	16	1	4	0	8	0	9	0	37	1
IFK Göteborg	1987	Allsvenskan	21	0	1	0	12	0	10	0	44	0
IFK Göteborg	1988	Allsvenskan	3	0	0	0	0	0	13	3	16	3
Total			40	1	6	0	20	0	32	3	97	4

== Honours ==
IFK Göteborg

- Swedish Champion: 1987
- UEFA Cup: 1986–87
