= Lennart Nilsson (footballer) =

Swedish footballer

Personal information
- Full name: Bo Lennart Roger Nilsson
- Date of birth: 1 January 1959 (age 67)
- Place of birth: Sweden
- Positions: Midfielder; striker

Senior career*
Years	Team	Apps	(Gls)
1978–1986	IF Elfsborg	171	(51)
1987–1990	IFK Göteborg	47	(12)
Total		218	(63)

International career
1982–1987	Sweden	6	(0)
- * Club domestic league appearances and goals

Bo Lennart Roger Nilsson (born 1 January 1959) is a Swedish former footballer, who played as a midfielder and striker for IF Elfsborg, IFK Göteborg and the Sweden national team. He scored IFK Göteborg's goal in their second leg away match against Dundee United in the 1987 UEFA Cup Final.

== Club career ==
Nilsson began his career at IF Elfsborg, where he spent eight years with the club, before moving to IFK Göteborg for a fee of SEK1.1 million, which was considered to be one of the most expensive club records at that time in Sweden. Whilst there, he won the 1986–87 UEFA Cup after netting the winning goal in the second leg of the final against Dundee United. Following the win, Nilsson picked up a knee injury, which kept him out for the rest of the season. He also helped IFK Göteborg win the 1990 Allsvenskan title, before retiring.

== International career ==
Nilsson received his first cap for the Sweden national team on 13 November 1982 as a substitute for Tommy Holmgren in a 1–0 Euro 1984 qualifier away win against Cyprus. Nilsson was capped six times, scoring no goals.

== Honours ==
IFK Göteborg

- Allsvenskan: 1990
- UEFA Cup: 1986–87

== See also ==
- List of Allsvenskan players
