= IFK Göteborg in European football =

Swedish club in European football

Idrottsföreningen Kamraterna Göteborg, commonly known as IFK Göteborg, is a Swedish professional football club based in Gothenburg. The club have participated in 32 editions of the club competitions governed by UEFA, the chief authority for football across Europe. These include 15 seasons in the European Cup and Champions League, 14 seasons in the UEFA Cup and Europa League, two seasons in the Cup Winners' Cup and one season in the Intertoto Cup. IFK Göteborg is the only Swedish club to have won a UEFA governed competition, as the club won the UEFA Cup in 1982 and 1987. The International Federation of Football History & Statistics ranks IFK Göteborg as the 32nd most successful European club, and the most successful Nordic club, of the 20th century. Counting all of the 169 games the side have played in UEFA competitions since their first entry into the European Cup in the 1958–59 season, the team's record stands at 74 wins, 35 draws and 60 defeats.

== Key ==
	Overall record
S	Seasons played
Pld	Games played
W	Games won
D	Games drawn
L	Games lost
GF	Goals for
GA	Goals against
GD	Goal difference

	Stages
QR(#)	Qualifying round (#)
PO	Play-off round
PR	Preliminary round
R#	Round #
GS	Group stage
QF	Quarter-finals
SF	Semi-finals
F	Final

	Matches
Agg	Aggregated score
Ref	Reference
N/A	Aggregated score not applicable
aet	Match determined after extra time
ag	Match determined by away goals rule
apen	Match determined after penalty shoot-out
rep	Replay match

== Overall record ==
As of 15 August 2026

=== By competition ===
The following list details IFK Göteborg's record per UEFA tournament. Statistics include goals scored during extra time where applicable; in these games, the result given is the result at the end of extra time. The result of games decided after a penalty shoot-out is given as result at the end of extra time.

Tournament	S	Pld	W	D	L	GF	GA	GD
European Champion Clubs' Cup/UEFA Champions League	15	82	35	13	34	138	119	+19
UEFA Cup/UEFA Europa League	16	69	32	18	19	97	59	+38
UEFA Conference League	1	4	1	1	2	5	5	0
European Cup Winners' Cup/UEFA Cup Winners' Cup	2	8	2	3	3	7	11	−4
UEFA Intertoto Cup	1	6	4	0	2	9	8	+1
Total	35	169	74	35	60	256	202	+54

=== By opponent club nationality ===
The following list details IFK Göteborg's record totaled by the nationality of the clubs they have played in UEFA tournaments. The nationality is given as the club nationality at the time the game was played, and not as the current nationality of the club. Statistics include goals scored during extra time where applicable; in these games, the result given is the result at the end of extra time. The result of games decided after a penalty shoot-out is given as result at the end of extra time.

Country	Pld	W	D	L	GF	GA	GD
Albania	4	2	2	0	5	1	+4
Austria	4	3	1	0	10	4	+6
Azerbaijan	2	1	0	1	1	3	−2
Belgium	6	3	1	2	8	4	+4
Bulgaria	2	2	0	0	5	3	+2
Cyprus	2	2	0	0	7	2	+5
Czech Republic	2	1	0	1	2	1	+1
Czechoslovakia (Note: The opponent that represented Czechoslovakia (against which both games were played) is now representing the Czech Republic.)	2	1	1	0	5	1	+4
Denmark	3	0	1	2	2	4	−2
East Germany (Note: The opponents that represented East Germany and West Germany are now representing Germany.)	4	1	2	1	5	7	−2
England	4	1	1	2	6	10	−4
Estonia	2	1	0	1	4	3	+1
Finland	4	3	0	1	10	4	+6
France	2	0	0	2	0	4	−4
Germany	6	1	2	3	4	9	−5
Greece	6	1	2	3	6	8	−2
Hungary	8	4	2	2	13	8	+5
Ireland (Note: The games against Derry City FC are counted as games against a team from Ireland in European competition as they compete in the Irish league system, even though the team is based in Northern Ireland.)	6	2	1	3	5	4	+1
Israel	2	0	1	1	2	4	−2
Italy	10	2	2	6	7	18	−11
Luxembourg	11	9	1	1	38	5	+33
Moldova	2	0	1	1	3	5	−2
Netherlands	11	5	0	6	17	26	−9
Northern Ireland	2	1	0	1	7	3	+4
Norway	2	0	0	2	2	4	−2
Poland	12	5	3	4	13	10	+3
Portugal	8	1	2	5	3	9	−6
Romania	4	3	0	1	6	6	0
San Marino	2	2	0	0	9	0	+9
Scotland	6	2	4	0	8	4	+4
Slovakia	2	0	1	1	1	2	−1
Spain	6	3	2	1	10	7	+3
Soviet Union (Note: The opponent that represented the Soviet Union (against which both games were played) is now representing Lithuania.)	2	1	0	1	1	2	−1
Switzerland	2	0	1	1	3	5	−2
Turkey	10	6	0	4	14	8	+6
Wales	2	2	0	0	7	1	+6
West Germany	4	3	1	0	7	2	+5

=== By club ===
The following list details IFK Göteborg's record against clubs they have played three or more times in UEFA tournaments. Statistics include goals scored during extra time where applicable; in these games, the result given is the result at the end of extra time. The result of games decided after a penalty shoot-out is given as result at the end of extra time.

Club	Country	Pld	W	D	L	GF	GA	GD
KKS Lech Poznań	Poland	4	3	1	0	6	1	+5
KAA Gent	Belgium	4	2	1	1	6	2	+4
FC Barcelona	Spain	4	2	1	1	6	5	+1
Fenerbahçe SK	Turkey	4	2	0	2	7	4	+3
Beşiktaş JK	Turkey	4	2	0	2	5	4	+1
FC Bayern München	Germany	4	1	2	1	4	5	−1
FC Porto	Portugal	4	1	0	3	2	6	−4
AS Roma	Italy	4	1	0	3	2	7	−5
AC Milan	Italy	4	1	0	3	4	10	−6
Panathinaikos FC	Greece	4	0	2	2	4	7	−3
WKS Legia Warsaw	Poland	4	0	0	4	2	9	−7
AS la Jeunesse d'Esch	Luxembourg	3	2	0	1	7	3	+4
Sparta Rotterdam	Netherlands	3	1	0	2	5	7	−2

== Matches ==
=== European Champion Clubs' Cup/UEFA Champions League ===
Season	Stage	Opponent		Date	Venue	Score	Agg	Ref (Note: See Josephson & Jönsson 2004 and Lindahl 2005 for matches played until 2004, Josephson & Jönsson 2014 for matches played 2004–2014, and each season page at ifkdb.se – IFK Göteborgs 118 säsonger for all matches.)
Season	Stage	Team	Country	Date	Venue	Score	Agg	Ref
1958–59	PR	AS la Jeunesse d'Esch	Luxembourg	14 September 1958	Stade de la Frontière, Esch-sur-Alzette	2–1	7–3	
1958–59	PR	AS la Jeunesse d'Esch	Luxembourg	30 September 1958	Ullevi, Gothenburg	0–1	7–3	
1958–59	PR	AS la Jeunesse d'Esch	Luxembourg	15 October 1958	Ullevi, Gothenburg	5–1 (rep)	7–3	
1958–59	R1	SC Wismut Karl-Marx-Stadt	East Germany	9 November 1958	Otto-Grotewohl-Stadion, Aue	2–2	2–6	
1958–59	R1	SC Wismut Karl-Marx-Stadt	East Germany	15 November 1958	Gamla Ullevi, Gothenburg	0–4	2–6	
1959–60	PR	Linfield FC	Northern Ireland	9 September 1959	Windsor Park, Belfast	1–2	7–3	
1959–60	PR	Linfield FC	Northern Ireland	23 September 1959	Ullevi, Gothenburg	6–1	7–3	
1959–60	R1	Sparta Rotterdam	Netherlands	25 October 1959	Het Kasteel, Rotterdam	1–3	5–7	
1959–60	R1	Sparta Rotterdam	Netherlands	5 November 1959	Ullevi, Gothenburg	3–1	5–7	
1959–60	R1	Sparta Rotterdam	Netherlands	25 November 1959	Weserstadion, Bremen	1–3 (rep)	5–7	
1961–62	PR	SC Feijenoord	Netherlands	6 September 1961	Ullevi, Gothenburg	0–3	2–11	
1961–62	PR	SC Feijenoord	Netherlands	13 September 1961	De Kuip, Rotterdam	2–8	2–11	
1970–71	PR	WKS Legia Warsaw	Poland	15 September 1970	Ullevi, Gothenburg	0–4	1–6	
1970–71	PR	WKS Legia Warsaw	Poland	30 September 1970	Stadion Wojska Polskiego, Warsaw	1–2	1–6	
1983–84	R1	AS Roma	Italy	14 September 1983	Stadio Olimpico, Rome	0–3	2–4	
1983–84	R1	AS Roma	Italy	28 September 1983	Ullevi, Gothenburg	2–1	2–4	
1984–85	R1	FC Avenir Beggen	Luxembourg	19 September 1984	Stade rue Henri Dunant, Luxembourg	8–0	17–0	
1984–85	R1	FC Avenir Beggen	Luxembourg	3 October 1984	Ullevi, Gothenburg	9–0	17–0	
1984–85	R2	KSK Beveren	Belgium	24 October 1984	Ullevi, Gothenburg	1–0	2–2 (ag)	
1984–85	R2	KSK Beveren	Belgium	7 November 1984	Freethiel, Beveren	1–2 (aet)	2–2 (ag)	
1984–85	QF	Panathinaikos AO	Greece	6 March 1985	Ullevi, Gothenburg	0–1	2–3	
1984–85	QF	Panathinaikos AO	Greece	20 March 1985	Olympiako Stadio Spyros Louis, Athens	2–2	2–3	
1985–86	R1	FK Trakia Plovdiv	Bulgaria	18 September 1985	Ullevi, Gothenburg	3–2	5–3	
1985–86	R1	FK Trakia Plovdiv	Bulgaria	2 October 1985	Stadion Hristo Botev, Plovdiv	2–1	5–3	
1985–86	R2	Fenerbahçe SK	Turkey	23 October 1985	Ullevi, Gothenburg	4–0	5–2	
1985–86	R2	Fenerbahçe SK	Turkey	6 November 1985	İnönü Stadyumu, Istanbul	1–2	5–2	
1985–86	QF	Aberdeen FC	Scotland	5 March 1986	Pittodrie Stadium, Aberdeen	2–2	2–2 (ag)	
1985–86	QF	Aberdeen FC	Scotland	19 March 1986	Ullevi, Gothenburg	0–0	2–2 (ag)	
1985–86	SF	FC Barcelona	Spain	2 April 1986	Ullevi, Gothenburg	3–0	7–8 (apen)	
1985–86	SF	FC Barcelona	Spain	16 April 1986	Camp Nou, Barcelona	0–3 (aet)	7–8 (apen)	
1988–89	R1	Pezoporikos Omilos Larnakas	Cyprus	7 September 1988	GSZ, Larnaca	2–1	7–2	
1988–89	R1	Pezoporikos Omilos Larnakas	Cyprus	5 October 1988	Ullevi, Gothenburg	5–1	7–2	
1988–89	R2	KS 17 Nëntori Tirana	Albania	26 October 1988	Stadiumi Kombëtar Qemal Stafa, Tirana	3–0	4–0	
1988–89	R2	KS 17 Nëntori Tirana	Albania	9 November 1988	Ullevi, Gothenburg	1–0	4–0	
1988–89	QF	CSA Steaua București	Romania	1 March 1989	Ullevi, Gothenburg	1–0	2–5	
1988–89	QF	CSA Steaua București	Romania	15 March 1989	Ghencea, Bucharest	1–5	2–5	
1991–92	R1	KS Flamurtari Vlorë	Albania	18 September 1991	Ullevi, Gothenburg	0–0	1–1 (ag)	
1991–92	R1	KS Flamurtari Vlorë	Albania	2 October 1991	Stadiumi Flamurtari, Vlorë	1–1	1–1 (ag)	
1991–92	R2	Panathinaikos AO	Greece	23 October 1991	Olympiako Stadio Spyros Louis, Athens	0–2	2–4	
1991–92	R2	Panathinaikos AO	Greece	6 November 1991	Ullevi, Gothenburg	2–2	2–4	
1992–93	R1	Beşiktaş JK	Turkey	16 September 1992	Gamla Ullevi, Gothenburg	2–0	3–2	
1992–93	R1	Beşiktaş JK	Turkey	30 September 1992	İnönü Stadyumu, Istanbul	1–2	3–2	
1992–93	R2	KKS Lech Poznań	Poland	21 October 1992	Gamla Ullevi, Gothenburg	1–0	4–0	
1992–93	R2	KKS Lech Poznań	Poland	4 November 1992	Stadion Lecha, Poznań	3–0	4–0	
1992–93	GS	AC Milan	Italy	25 November 1992	San Siro, Milan	0–4	2nd	
1992–93	GS	FC Porto	Portugal	9 December 1992	Ullevi, Gothenburg	1–0	2nd	
1992–93	GS	PSV	Netherlands	3 March 1993	Philips Stadion, Eindhoven	3–1	2nd	
1992–93	GS	PSV	Netherlands	17 March 1993	Ullevi, Gothenburg	3–0	2nd	
1992–93	GS	AC Milan	Italy	7 April 1993	Ullevi, Gothenburg	0–1	2nd	
1992–93	GS	FC Porto	Portugal	21 April 1993	Estádio das Antas, Porto	0–2	2nd	
1994–95	QR	AC Sparta Praha	Czech Republic	10 August 1994	Stadion Střelnice, Jablonec nad Nisou	0–1	2–1	
1994–95	QR	AC Sparta Praha	Czech Republic	24 August 1994	Gamla Ullevi, Gothenburg	2–0	2–1	
1994–95	GS	Manchester United FC	England	14 September 1994	Old Trafford, Manchester	2–4	1st	
1994–95	GS	FC Barcelona	Spain	28 September 1994	Ullevi, Gothenburg	2–1	1st	
1994–95	GS	Galatasaray SK	Turkey	19 October 1994	Ullevi, Gothenburg	1–0	1st	
1994–95	GS	Galatasaray SK	Turkey	2 November 1994	Ali Sami Yen Stadyumu, Istanbul	1–0	1st	
1994–95	GS	Manchester United FC	England	23 November 1994	Ullevi, Gothenburg	3–1	1st	
1994–95	GS	FC Barcelona	Spain	7 December 1994	Camp Nou, Barcelona	1–1	1st	
1994–95	QF	FC Bayern München	Germany	1 March 1995	Olympiastadion, Munich	0–0	2–2 (ag)	
1994–95	QF	FC Bayern München	Germany	15 March 1995	Ullevi, Gothenburg	2–2	2–2 (ag)	
1995–96	QR	WKS Legia Warsaw	Poland	9 August 1995	Stadion Wojska Polskiego, Warsaw	0–1	1–3	
1995–96	QR	WKS Legia Warsaw	Poland	23 August 1995	Gamla Ullevi, Gothenburg	1–2	1–3	
1996–97	QR	Ferencvárosi TC	Hungary	7 August 1996	Norrköpings Idrottspark, Norrköping	3–0	4–1	
1996–97	QR	Ferencvárosi TC	Hungary	21 August 1996	Üllői út, Budapest	1–1	4–1	
1996–97	GS	Rosenborg BK	Norway	11 September 1996	Ullevi, Gothenburg	2–3	4th	
1996–97	GS	FC Porto	Portugal	25 September 1996	Estádio das Antas, Porto	1–2	4th	
1996–97	GS	AC Milan	Italy	16 October 1996	Ullevi, Gothenburg	2–1	4th	
1996–97	GS	AC Milan	Italy	30 October 1996	San Siro, Milan	2–4	4th	
1996–97	GS	Rosenborg BK	Norway	20 November 1996	Lerkendal Stadion, Trondheim	0–1	4th	
1996–97	GS	FC Porto	Portugal	4 December 1996	Ullevi, Gothenburg	0–2	4th	
1997–98	QR2	Rangers FC	Scotland	13 August 1997	Ullevi, Gothenburg	3–0	4–1	
1997–98	QR2	Rangers FC	Scotland	27 August 1997	Ibrox Stadium, Glasgow	1–1	4–1	
1997–98	GS	Paris Saint-Germain FC	France	17 September 1997	Parc des Princes, Paris	0–3	4th	
1997–98	GS	FC Bayern München	Germany	1 October 1997	Ullevi, Gothenburg	1–3	4th	
1997–98	GS	Beşiktaş JK	Turkey	21 October 1997	İnönü Stadyumu, Istanbul	0–1	4th	
1997–98	GS	Beşiktaş JK	Turkey	5 November 1997	Ullevi, Gothenburg	2–1	4th	
1997–98	GS	Paris Saint-Germain FC	France	26 November 1997	Ullevi, Gothenburg	0–1	4th	
1997–98	GS	FC Bayern München	Germany	10 December 1997	Olympiastadion, Munich	1–0	4th	
2008–09	QR1	SS Murata	San Marino	15 July 2008	Stadio Olimpico, Serravalle	5–0	9–0	
2008–09	QR1	SS Murata	San Marino	23 July 2008	Ullevi, Gothenburg	4–0	9–0	
2008–09	QR2	FC Basel 1893	Switzerland	30 July 2008	Ullevi, Gothenburg	1–1	3–5	
2008–09	QR2	FC Basel 1893	Switzerland	6 August 2008	St. Jakob-Park, Basel	2–4	3–5	

=== UEFA Cup/UEFA Europa League ===
Season	Stage	Opponent		Date	Venue	Score	Agg	Ref
Season	Stage	Team	Country	Date	Venue	Score	Agg	Ref
1980–81	R1	FC Twente '65	Netherlands	17 September 1980	Diekman Stadion, Enschede	1–5	3–5	
1980–81	R1	FC Twente '65	Netherlands	1 October 1980	Ullevi, Gothenburg	2–0	3–5	
1981–82	R1	Valkeakosken Haka	Finland	16 September 1981	Tampereen Stadion, Tampere	3–2	7–2	
1981–82	R1	Valkeakosken Haka	Finland	30 September 1981	Ullevi, Gothenburg	4–0	7–2	
1981–82	R2	SK Sturm Graz	Austria	20 October 1981	Gruabn, Graz	2–2	5–3	
1981–82	R2	SK Sturm Graz	Austria	4 November 1981	Ullevi, Gothenburg	3–2	5–3	
1981–82	R3	CS Dinamo București	Romania	25 November 1981	Ullevi, Gothenburg	3–1	4–1	
1981–82	R3	CS Dinamo București	Romania	9 December 1981	Stadionul Dinamo, Bucharest	1–0	4–1	
1981–82	QF	Valencia CF	Spain	3 March 1982	Estadio Luís Casanova, Valencia	2–2	4–2	
1981–82	QF	Valencia CF	Spain	17 March 1982	Ullevi, Gothenburg	2–0	4–2	
1981–82	SF	1. FC Kaiserslautern	West Germany	7 April 1982	Betzenbergstadion, Valencia	1–1	3–2	
1981–82	SF	1. FC Kaiserslautern	West Germany	21 April 1982	Ullevi, Gothenburg	2–1 (aet)	3–2	
1981–82	F	Hamburger SV	West Germany	5 May 1982	Ullevi, Gothenburg	1–0	4–0	
1981–82	F	Hamburger SV	West Germany	19 May 1982	Volksparkstadion, Hamburg	3–0	4–0	
1986–87	R1	TJ Sigma ZTS Olomouc	Czechoslovakia	17 September 1986	Andrův Stadion, Olomouc	1–1	5–1	
1986–87	R1	TJ Sigma ZTS Olomouc	Czechoslovakia	1 October 1986	Ullevi, Gothenburg	4–0	5–1	
1986–87	R2	BSG Stahl Brandenburg	East Germany	22 October 1986	Ullevi, Gothenburg	2–0	3–1	
1986–87	R2	BSG Stahl Brandenburg	East Germany	5 November 1986	Stadion der Stahlwerker, Brandenburg an der Havel	1–1	3–1	
1986–87	R3	KAA Gent	Belgium	26 November 1986	Jules Ottenstadion, Ghent	1–0	5–0	
1986–87	R3	KAA Gent	Belgium	10 December 1986	Ullevi, Gothenburg	4–0	5–0	
1986–87	QF	FC Internazionale Milano	Italy	4 March 1987	Ullevi, Gothenburg	0–0	1–1 (ag)	
1986–87	QF	FC Internazionale Milano	Italy	18 March 1987	San Siro, Milan	1–1	1–1 (ag)	
1986–87	SF	FC Swarovski Tirol	Austria	8 April 1987	Ullevi, Gothenburg	4–1	5–1	
1986–87	SF	FC Swarovski Tirol	Austria	22 April 1987	Tivoli, Innsbruck	1–0	5–1	
1986–87	F	Dundee United FC	Scotland	6 May 1987	Ullevi, Gothenburg	1–0	2–1	
1986–87	F	Dundee United FC	Scotland	20 May 1987	Tannadice Park, Dundee	1–1	2–1	
1987–88	R1	Brøndbyernes IF	Denmark	16 September 1987	Idrætsparken, Copenhagen	1–2	1–2	
1987–88	R1	Brøndbyernes IF	Denmark	30 September 1987	Ullevi, Gothenburg	0–0	1–2	
1989–90	R1	FK Žalgiris Vilnius	Soviet Union	13 September 1989	Žalgirio Stadionas, Vilnius	0–2	1–2	
1989–90	R1	FK Žalgiris Vilnius	Soviet Union	27 September 1989	Ullevi, Gothenburg	1–0	1–2	
1998–99	QR1	US Luxembourg	Luxembourg	22 July 1998	Stade Josy Barthel, Luxembourg	3–0	7–0	
1998–99	QR1	US Luxembourg	Luxembourg	28 July 1998	Ullevi, Gothenburg	4–0	7–0	
1998–99	QR2	Fenerbahçe SK	Turkey	11 August 1998	Ullevi, Gothenburg	2–1	2–2 (ag)	
1998–99	QR2	Fenerbahçe SK	Turkey	25 August 1998	Şükrü Saracoğlu Stadyumu, Istanbul	0–1	2–2 (ag)	
1999–2000	QR	Cork City FC	Ireland	12 August 1999	Ullevi, Gothenburg	3–0	3–1	
1999–2000	QR	Cork City FC	Ireland	26 August 1999	Turners Cross, Cork	0–1	3–1	
1999–2000	R1	KKS Lech Poznań	Poland	16 September 1999	Stadion Lecha, Poznań	2–1	2–1	
1999–2000	R1	KKS Lech Poznań	Poland	30 September 1999	Ullevi, Gothenburg	0–0	2–1	
1999–2000	R2	AS Roma	Italy	21 October 1999	Ullevi, Gothenburg	0–2	0–3	
1999–2000	R2	AS Roma	Italy	4 November 1999	Stadio Olimpico, Rome	0–1	0–3	
2002–03	QR	FC Zimbru Chișinău	Moldova	15 August 2002	Stadionul Republican, Chișinău	1–3	3–5	
2002–03	QR	FC Zimbru Chișinău	Moldova	29 August 2002	Gamla Ullevi, Gothenburg	2–2	3–5	
2006–07	QR1	Derry City FC	Ireland	13 July 2006	Ullevi, Gothenburg	0–1	0–2	
2006–07	QR1	Derry City FC	Ireland	27 July 2006	Brandywell Stadium, Derry	0–1	0–2	
2009–10	QR3	Hapoel Tel Aviv FC	Israel	30 July 2009	Gamla Ullevi, Gothenburg	1–3	2–4	
2009–10	QR3	Hapoel Tel Aviv FC	Israel	6 August 2009	Bloomfield Stadium, Tel Aviv	1–1	2–4	
2010–11	QR3	AZ	Netherlands	29 July 2010	AZ Stadion, Alkmaar	0–2	1–2	
2010–11	QR3	AZ	Netherlands	5 August 2010	Gamla Ullevi, Gothenburg	1–0	1–2	
2013–14	QR2	FK AS Trenčín	Slovakia	18 July 2013	Olympia, Helsingborg	0–0	1–2	
2013–14	QR2	FK AS Trenčín	Slovakia	25 July 2013	Mestský Štadión, Dubnica nad Váhom	1–2	1–2	
2014–15	QR1	CS Fola Esch	Luxembourg	3 July 2014	Gamla Ullevi, Gothenburg	0–0	2–0	
2014–15	QR1	CS Fola Esch	Luxembourg	10 July 2014	Stade Josy Barthel, Luxembourg	2–0	2–0	
2014–15	QR2	Győri ETO FC	Hungary	17 July 2014	ETO Park, Győr	3–0	3–1	
2014–15	QR2	Győri ETO FC	Hungary	24 July 2014	Gamla Ullevi, Gothenburg	0–1	3–1	
2014–15	QR3	Rio Ave FC	Portugal	31 July 2014	Gamla Ullevi, Gothenburg	0–1	0–1	
2014–15	QR3	Rio Ave FC	Portugal	7 August 2014	Estádio do Rio Ave FC, Vila do Conde	0–0	0–1	
2015–16	QR2	WKS Śląsk Wrocław	Poland	16 July 2015	Stadion Miejski, Wrocław	0–0	2–0	
2015–16	QR2	WKS Śląsk Wrocław	Poland	23 July 2015	Gamla Ullevi, Gothenburg	2–0	2–0	
2015–16	QR3	CF Os Belenenses	Portugal	30 July 2015	Estádio do Restelo, Lisbon	1–2	1–2	
2015–16	QR3	CF Os Belenenses	Portugal	6 August 2015	Gamla Ullevi, Gothenburg	0–0	1–2	
2016–17	QR1	Llandudno FC	Wales	30 June 2016	Gamla Ullevi, Gothenburg	5–0	7–1	
2016–17	QR1	Llandudno FC	Wales	7 July 2016	Nantporth, Bangor	2–1	7–1	
2016–17	QR2	GKS Piast Gliwice	Poland	14 July 2016	Stadion Miejski w Gliwicach, Gliwice	3–0	3–0	
2016–17	QR2	GKS Piast Gliwice	Poland	21 July 2016	Gamla Ullevi, Gothenburg	0–0	3–0	
2016–17	QR3	HJK	Finland	28 July 2016	Gamla Ullevi, Gothenburg	1–2	3–2	
2016–17	QR3	HJK	Finland	4 August 2016	Sonera Stadium, Helsinki	2–0	3–2	
2016–17	PO	Qarabağ FK	Azerbaijan	18 August 2016	Gamla Ullevi, Gothenburg	1–0	1–3	
2016–17	PO	Qarabağ FK	Azerbaijan	25 August 2016	Tofiq Bəhramov adına Respublika Stadionu, Baku	0–3	1–3	
2020–21	QR2	FC København	Denmark	17 September 2020	Ullevi, Gothenburg	1−2	N/A	

=== UEFA Conference League ===
Season	Stage	Opponent		Date	Venue	Score	Agg	Ref
Season	Stage	Team	Country	Date	Venue	Score	Agg	Ref
2026–27	QR2	FCI Levadia Tallinn	Estonia	21 July 2026	Gamla Ullevi, Gothenburg	1–2	4–3	
2026–27	QR2	FCI Levadia Tallinn	Estonia	30 July 2026	Lilleküla Stadium, Tallinn	3–1 (aet)	4–3	
2026–27	QR3	KAA Gent	Belgium	6 August 2026	Gamla Ullevi, Gothenburg	0–1	1–2	
2026–27	QR3	KAA Gent	Belgium	13 August 2026	Planet Group Arena, Ghent	1–1	1–2	

=== European Cup Winners' Cup/UEFA Cup Winners' Cup ===
Season	Stage	Opponent		Date	Venue	Score	Agg	Ref
Season	Stage	Team	Country	Date	Venue	Score	Agg	Ref
1979–80	R1	Waterford FC	Ireland	19 September 1979	Ullevi, Gothenburg	1–0	2–1	
1979–80	R1	Waterford FC	Ireland	3 October 1979	Kilcohan Park, Waterford	1–1	2–1	
1979–80	R2	Panionios GSS	Greece	24 October 1979	Stadio Neas Smyrnis, Athens	0–1	2–1	
1979–80	R2	Panionios GSS	Greece	3 November 1979	Ullevi, Gothenburg	2–0	2–1	
1979–80	QF	Arsenal FC	England	5 March 1980	Highbury, London	1–5	1–5	
1979–80	QF	Arsenal FC	England	19 March 1980	Ullevi, Gothenburg	0–0	1–5	
1982–83	R1	Újpesti Dózsa SC	Hungary	15 September 1982	Ullevi, Gothenburg	1–1	2–4	
1982–83	R1	Újpesti Dózsa SC	Hungary	29 September 1982	Megyeri út, Újpest	1–3	2–4	

=== UEFA Intertoto Cup ===
Season	Stage	Opponent		Date	Venue	Score	Agg	Ref
Season	Stage	Team	Country	Date	Venue	Score	Agg	Ref
2005	R1	FC Victoria Rosport	Luxembourg	18 June 2005	Stade Josy Barthel, Luxembourg	2–1	5–2	
2005	R1	FC Victoria Rosport	Luxembourg	25 June 2005	Gamla Ullevi, Gothenburg	3–1	5–2	
2005	R2	Lombard-Pápa TFC	Hungary	3 July 2005	Perutz Stadion, Pápa	3–2	4–2	
2005	R2	Lombard-Pápa TFC	Hungary	9 July 2005	Gamla Ullevi, Gothenburg	1–0	4–2	
2005	R3	VfL Wolfsburg	Germany	17 July 2005	Gamla Ullevi, Gothenburg	0–2	0–4	
2005	R3	VfL Wolfsburg	Germany	23 July 2005	Volkswagen Arena, Wolfsburg	0–2	0–4	
