= 1994–95 Rangers F.C. season =

Rangers
1994–95 season
- Chairman: David Murray
- Manager: Walter Smith
- Ground: Ibrox Stadium
- Scottish Premier Division: 1st
- Scottish Cup: Fourth round
- League Cup: Third round
- Champions League: Qualifying round
- Top goalscorer: League: Mark Hateley (13); All: Mark Hateley (15)
Home colours	Away colours	Third colours

The 1994–95 season was the 115th season of competitive football by Rangers.

== Overview ==
Rangers played a total of 42 competitive matches during the 1994–95 season. The club won the Premier Division with a commanding sixteen point lead over nearest challengers Motherwell.

The cup competitions were not so successful as the side crashed out the Scottish Cup in the fourth round to Hearts, losing 4–2. In the League Cup the side was defeated 2–1 by Falkirk.

The European campaign was over as soon as it began, the club was knocked out the UEFA Champions League in the first round by AEK Athens, losing 3–0 on aggregate.

Rangers made three expensive signings at the start of the season in shape of defenders Basile Boli and Alan McLaren, as well as forward Brian Laudrup. On his way out of the club was striker Duncan Ferguson after 18 months, when in December 1994 he signed for Everton in a £4.3 million deal after two months on loan in Merseyside, handing the Ibrox club a small profit on the then UK transfer record fee they originally paid for him.

The club's successful season was overshadowed by the death in March of club legend Davie Cooper at the age of 39.

== Transfers ==
=== In ===
Date	Player	From	Fee
15 June 1994	(Denmark) Brian Laudrup	(Italy) Fiorentina	£2,300,000
28 June 1994	(France) Basile Boli	(France) Marseille	£2,700,000
27 July 1994	(Scotland) Billy Thomson	(Scotland) Motherwell	£25,000
25 October 1994	(Scotland) Alan McLaren	(Scotland) Heart of Midlothian	£1,250,000 plus Dave McPherson
26 January 1995	(Scotland) Alec Cleland	(Scotland) Dundee United	£750,000 joint deal
26 January 1995	(Scotland) Gary Bollan	(Scotland) Dundee United	£750,000 joint deal

=== Out ===
Date	Player	To	Fee
30 June 1994	(England) Chris Vinnicombe	(England) Burnley	£200,000
28 July 1994	(England) Stephen Watson	(Scotland) St Mirren	Free
28 July 1994	(Ukraine) Oleh Kuznetsov	(Israel) Maccabi Haifa	Free
4 October 1994	(Scotland) Ian Durrant	(England) Everton	Loan
12 October 1994	(England) Gary Stevens	(England) Tranmere Rovers	£350,000
19 October 1994	(Scotland) Steven Pressley	(England) Coventry City	£600,000
25 October 1994	(Scotland) Dave McPherson	(Scotland) Heart of Midlothian	Part-exchange swap
1 December 1994	(Scotland) David Hagen	(Scotland) Heart of Midlothian	£150,000
13 December 1994	(Scotland) Duncan Ferguson	(England) Everton	£4,300,000
15 January 1995	(Netherlands) Peter Huistra	(Japan) Sanfrecce Hiroshima	£500,000
10 March 1995	(Scotland) Fraser Wishart	(Scotland) Heart of Midlothian	£50,000
24 March 1995	(Scotland) Scott McCulloch	(Scotland) Hamilton Academical	Free

- Expenditure: ▼£7,025,000
- Income: ▲£6,150,000
- Total loss/gain: ▼£875,000

== Results ==
All results are written with Rangers' score first.

=== Ibrox International Challenge Trophy ===
Date	Opponent	Venue	Result	Attendance	Scorers
5 August 1994	(Italy) Sampdoria	H	2–4		Hateley, Steven
6 August 1995	(England) Manchester United	H	1–0		May (o.g.)

=== Scottish Premier Division ===
Date	Opponent	Venue	Result	Attendance	Scorers
13 August 1994	Motherwell	H	2–1	43,750	Hateley, D.Ferguson
20 August 1994	Partick Thistle	A	2–0	15,030	Hateley, Byrne (o.g.)
27 August 1994	Celtic	H	0–2	45,466	
11 September 1994	Heart of Midlothian	H	3–0	41,041	Hateley (2), Durie
17 September 1994	Falkirk	A	2–0	12,419	Boli, Laudrup
24 September 1994	Aberdeen	A	2–2	19,191	Hateley, Moore
1 October 1994	Dundee United	H	2–0	43,030	Hateley, Laudrup
8 October 1994	Hibernian	A	1–2	12,118	Boli
15 October 1994	Kilmarnock	H	2–0	44,099	Miller, Robertson
22 October 1994	Motherwell	A	1–2	11,160	Philliben (o.g.)
30 October 1994	Celtic	A	3–1	32,171	Hateley (2), Laudrup
5 November 1994	Partick Thistle	H	3–0	43,696	Miller, Hateley, Laudrup
9 November 1994	Heart of Midlothian	A	1–1	12,347	Hateley
19 November 1994	Falkirk	H	1–1	44,018	Hateley
25 November 1994	Aberdeen	H	1–0	45,072	McCoist
4 December 1994	Dundee United	A	3–0	10,692	Laudrup, Huistra, Durrant
10 December 1994	Kilmarnock	A	2–1	17,283	McLaren, Laudrup
26 December 1994	Hibernian	H	2–0	44,892	Hateley, Gough
31 December 1994	Motherwell	A	3–1	11,269	McCall, Laudrup, Durie
4 January 1995	Celtic	H	1–1	45,794	I.Ferguson
7 January 1995	Partick Thistle	A	1–1	19,351	Robertson
14 January 1995	Falkirk	A	3–2	13,495	Huistra (2, 1 (pen.)), McCall
21 January 1995	Heart of Midlothian	H	1–0	44,231	Miller
4 February 1995	Dundee United	H	1–1	44,197	Robertson
12 February 1995	Aberdeen	A	0–2	18,060	
25 February 1995	Kilmarnock	H	3–0	44,859	Durie, Laudrup, Durrant
4 March 1995	Hibernian	A	1–1	12,059	McCall
11 March 1995	Falkirk	H	2–2	43,359	Brown, Laudrup
18 March 1995	Heart of Midlothian	A	1–2	9,806	Laudrup
1 April 1995	Dundee United	A	2–0	11,035	Durie, McLaren
8 April 1995	Aberdeen	H	3–2	44,460	Durrant, Murray, Hateley
16 April 1995	Hibernian	H	3–1	44,193	Durie, Durrant, Mikhailichenko
20 April 1995	Kilmarnock	A	1–0	16,086	Mikhailichenko
29 April 1995	Motherwell	H	0–2	43,576	
7 May 1995	Celtic	A	0–3	31,025	
13 May 1995	Partick Thistle	H	1–1	45,280	Moore

=== Scottish League Cup ===
Date	Round	Opponent	Venue	Result	Attendance	Scorers
17 August 1994	R2	Arbroath	A	6–1	4,665	D.Ferguson (3), Hateley (2), McCall
31 August 1994	R3	Falkirk	H	1–2	40,697	Laudrup

=== Scottish Cup ===
Date	Round	Opponent	Venue	Result	Attendance	Scorers
6 February 1995	R3	Hamilton Academical	A	3–1	18,379	Steven, Boli, Laudrup
20 February 1995	R4	Heart of Midlothian	A	2–4	12,375	Laudrup, Durie

=== UEFA Champions League ===
Date	Round	Opponent	Venue	Result	Attendance	Scorers
10 August 1994	QR	(Greece) AEK Athens	A	0–2	30,000	
24 August 1994	QR	(Greece) AEK Athens	H	0–1	44,789	

== Appearances ==
Player	Position	Appearances	Goals
(Scotland) Andy Goram	GK	22	0
(Scotland) Ally Maxwell	GK	14	0
(Scotland) Colin Scott	GK	4	0
(Scotland) Billy Thomson	GK	5	0
(France) Basile Boli	DF	31	3
(Scotland) Gary Bollan	DF	6	0
(Scotland) John Brown	DF	16	1
(Scotland) Neil Caldwell	DF	1	0
(Scotland) Alec Cleland	DF	11	0
(Scotland) Richard Gough	DF	31	1
(Scotland) Alan McLaren	DF	25	2
(Scotland) Dave McPherson	DF	12	0
(Australia) Craig Moore	DF	25	2
(Scotland) Steven Pressley	DF	3	0
(Scotland) David Robertson	DF	28	3
(England) Gary Stevens	DF	1	0
(Scotland) Fraser Wishart	DF	4	0
(Scotland) Ian Durrant	MF	31	4
(Scotland) Ian Ferguson	MF	20	1
(Scotland) David Hagen	MF	2	0
(Netherlands) Pieter Huistra	MF	15	3
(Scotland) Stuart McCall	MF	36	4
(Scotland) Brian McGinty	MF	1	0
(Ukraine) Oleksiy Mykhaylychenko	MF	9	2
(Scotland) Charlie Miller	MF	23	3
(Denmark) Brian Laudrup	MF	38	13
(Scotland) Neil Murray	MF	22	1
(Scotland) Lee Robertson	MF	1	0
(England) Trevor Steven	MF	13	1
(Scotland) Gordon Durie	FW	25	6
(Scotland) Duncan Ferguson	FW	7	4
(England) Mark Hateley	FW	28	15
(Scotland) Ally McCoist	FW	9	1
(Northern Ireland) Paul McKnight	FW	1	0

== League table ==
Pos	Team	Pld	W	D	L	GF	GA	GD	Pts	Qualification or relegation
1	Rangers (C)	36	20	9	7	60	35	+25	69	Qualification for the Champions League qualifying round
2	Motherwell	36	14	12	10	50	50	0	54	Qualification for the UEFA Cup preliminary round
3	Hibernian	36	12	17	7	49	37	+12	53	
4	Celtic	36	11	18	7	39	33	+6	51	Qualification for the Cup Winners' Cup first round (Note: Celtic qualified for the 1995–96 UEFA Cup Winners' Cup by winning the 1994–95 Scottish Cup.)
5	Falkirk	36	12	12	12	48	47	+1	48	

Updated to match(es) played on end of season. Source: Soccerbase
Rules for classification: 1) Points; 2) Goal difference; 3) Goals scored
(C) Champions

== See also ==
- 1994–95 in Scottish football
- Nine in a row
