= 1991–92 Rangers F.C. season =

Rangers
1991–92 season
- Chairman: David Murray
- Manager: Walter Smith
- Ground: Ibrox Stadium
- Scottish Premier Division: 1st
- Scottish Cup: Winners
- League Cup: Semi-finals
- European Cup: First round
- Top goalscorer: League: Ally McCoist (34); All: Ally McCoist (39)

The 1991–92 season was the 112th season of competitive football by Rangers.

== Overview ==
Rangers played a total of 55 competitive matches during the 1991–92 season. The team finished first in the Scottish Premier Division and collected the fourth of their nine league titles after winning 33 of their 44 league games.

Rangers won the league by 9 points, the title being won at Ibrox against St Mirren with a 4–0 victory in April.

Transfer activity was heavily influenced by restrictions imposed by UEFA in European competitions. Match squads could only include a maximum of three foreign nationals, and as a result English players at Ibrox were considered "foreigners". The most significant move was the sale of England international goalkeeper Chris Woods to Sheffield Wednesday He was replaced by Scotland international goalkeeper Andy Goram from Hibernian.

In the cup competitions, they were knocked out of the Scottish League Cup at the semi-final stage, losing 1–0 to Hibernian. Rangers won the Scottish Cup for the first time since 1981, defeating Airdrieonians 2–1 after a 1–0 win over Celtic in the semi-finals.

In Europe they were knocked out the European Cup in the first round by Czechoslovak side Sparta Prague. They lost on away goals rule after tying the match 2–2 on aggregate.

Ally McCoist was awarded his first European Golden Boot for finishing as the top goal scorer across all European leagues with 34 goals. The McCoist / Hateley strike partnership yielded an impressive 62 goals during the season.

== Transfers ==
=== In ===
Date	Player	From	Fee
19 June 1991	(Scotland) Andy Goram	(Scotland) Hibernian	£1,000,000
1 July 1991	(Scotland) David Robertson	(Scotland) Aberdeen	£970,000
5 July 1991	(Soviet Union) Oleksiy Mykhaylychenko	(Italy) Sampdoria	£2,000,000
15 August 1991	(Scotland) Stuart McCall	(England) Everton	£1,200,000
15 August 1991	(Scotland) David McKellar	(Scotland) Kilmarnock	£20,000
2 November 1991	(England) Dale Gordon	(England) Norwich City	£1,200,000
10 January 1992	(England) Paul Rideout	(England) Notts County	£500,000

=== Out ===
Date	Player	To	Fee
21 June 1991	(Scotland) Stuart Munro	(England) Blackburn Rovers	£200,000
24 June 1991	(Israel) Boni Ginzburg	(Israel) Maccabi Yavne	Free
11 July 1991	(Scotland) Tom Cowan	(England) Sheffield United	£350,000
22 July 1991	(Scotland) Neale Cooper	(England) Reading	Free
8 August 1991	(England) Mark Walters	(England) Liverpool	£1,250,000
14 August 1991	(England) Chris Woods	(England) Sheffield Wednesday	£1,000,000
15 August 1991	(England) Trevor Steven	(France) Marseille	£5,500,000
5 September 1991	(England) Terry Hurlock	(England) Southampton	£400,000
18 November 1991	(Scotland) Mo Johnston	(England) Everton	£1,550,000

- Expenditure: ▼£6,890,000
- Income: ▲£10,250,000
- Total loss/gain: ▲£3,360,000

== Results ==
All results are written with Rangers' score first.

=== Scottish Premier Division ===
Date	Opponent	Venue	Result	Attendance	Scorers
10 August 1991	St Johnstone	H	6–0	35,109	Hateley (3), Johnston (2, 1 (pen.)), Ferguson
13 August 1991	Motherwell	H	2–0	35,323	Steven, Maaskant (o.g.)
17 August 1991	Heart of Midlothian	A	0–1	22,534	
24 August 1991	Dunfermline Athletic	H	4–0	35,559	Huistra, Johnston, Spencer, McCoist
31 August 1991	Celtic	A	2–0	51,382	Hateley (2)
7 September 1991	Falkirk	A	2–0	13,088	Nisbet, Huistra
14 September 1991	Dundee United	H	1–1	36,347	McCoist
21 September 1991	St Mirren	A	2–1	14,503	Huistra, Nisbet
28 September 1991	Aberdeen	H	0–2	36,330	
5 October 1991	Airdrieonians	A	4–0	11,101	McCoist (2), Nisbet, Johnston
8 October 1991	Hibernian	H	4–2	35,368	McCoist (2), Huistra, Tortolano (o.g.)
12 October 1991	St Johnstone	A	3–2	10,323	McCoist (2), Nisbet
19 October 1991	Heart of Midlothian	H	2–0	36,481	McCoist, Mikhailichenko
26 October 1991	Falkirk	H	1–1	36,441	Johnston
29 October 1991	Dundee United	A	2–3	15,041	McCoist (2)
2 November 1991	Celtic	H	1–1	37,387	McCoist
9 November 1991	Dunfermline Athletic	A	5–0	13,351	Gordon (2), Gough, Hateley, McCoist
16 November 1991	Airdrieonians	H	4–0	36,934	Hateley (2), Robertson, McCoist
19 November 1991	Hibernian	A	3–0	16,833	McCoist (2), Hateley
23 November 1991	St Mirren	H	0–1	36,272	
30 November 1991	Motherwell	A	2–0	15,350	Gordon, Gough
4 December 1991	Aberdeen	A	3–2	20,081	Hateley (2), McCoist
7 December 1991	St Johnstone	H	3–1	35,784	Mikhailichenko, Brown, Hateley
14 December 1991	Falkirk	A	3–1	11,801	McCoist, Hateley, McCall
21 December 1991	Dundee United	H	2–0	41,448	McCoist (2)
28 December 1991	Dunfermline Athletic	H	2–1	41,328	Stevens, Gordon
1 January 1992	Celtic	A	3–1	51,789	McCoist, Hateley (pen.), Brown
4 January 1992	Airdrieonians	A	0–0	12,276	
11 January 1992	Hibernian	H	2–0	40,616	Gordon, McCoist
18 January 1992	Motherwell	H	2–0	38,217	McCoist, Mikhailichenko
1 February 1992	Heart of Midlothian	A	2–0	24,356	McCoist, Mikhailichenko
8 February 1992	St Mirren	A	2–1	16,638	McCoist, Mikhailichenko
25 February 1992	Aberdeen	H	0–0	38,513	
29 February 1992	Airdrieonians	H	5–0	40,568	Hateley (3, 2 (pen.)), Brown, Rideout
10 March 1992	Hibernian	A	3–1	13,387	Hateley (2, 1 (pen.)), McCoist
14 March 1992	Dunfermline Athletic	A	3–1	12,274	Mikhailichenho (2), Nisbet
21 March 1992	Celtic	H	0–2	42,160	
28 March 1992	St Johnstone	A	2–1	9,697	Hateley (2)
7 April 1992	Falkirk	H	4–1	36,832	McCoist (3), Mikhailichenko
11 April 1992	Dundee United	A	2–1	11,713	Mikhailichenko, Brown
18 April 1992	St Mirren	H	4–0	40,362	McCoist (2), Stevens, Huistra
23 April 1992	Motherwell	A	2–1	12,515	Mikhailichenko (2)
28 April 1992	Heart of Midlothian	H	1–1	36,129	McCoist
2 May 1992	Aberdeen	A	2–0	16,580	McCoist (2)

=== Scottish League Cup ===
Date	Round	Opponent	Venue	Result	Attendance	Scorers
20 August 1991	R2	Queen's Park	H	6–0	32,230	Johnston (4), Durrant, Spackman
28 August 1991	R3	Partick Thistle	A	2–0	12,587	Johnston, D.Robertson
4 September 1991	QF	Heart of Midlothian	A	1–0	22,878	McCoist
25 September 1991	SF	Hibernian	N	0–1	40,901	

=== Scottish Cup ===
Date	Round	Opponent	Venue	Result	Attendance	Scorers
22 January 1992	R3	Aberdeen	A	1–0	23,000	McCoist
15 February 1992	R4	Motherwell	H	2–1	38,444	Mikhailichenko (2)
3 March 1992	QF	St Johnstone	A	3–0	10,107	McCoist, Gough, Hateley
31 March 1992	SF	Celtic	N	1–0	45,191	McCoist
9 May 1992	F	Airdrieonians	N	2–1	44,045	McCoist, Hateley

=== European Cup ===
Date	Round	Opponent	Venue	Result	Attendance	Scorers
18 September 1991	R1	(Czechoslovakia) Sparta Prague	A	0–1	11,053	
2 October 1991	R1	(Czechoslovakia) Sparta Prague	H	2–1	34,260	McCall (2)

== Appearances ==
Player	Position	Appearances	Goals
(Scotland) Andy Goram	GK	55	0
(Scotland) John Brown	DF	33	4
(Scotland) Richard Gough	DF	42	3
(Soviet Union) (Commonwealth of Independent States) Oleh Kuznetsov	DF	19	0
(Scotland) John McGregor	DF	1	0
(Scotland) Scott Nisbet	DF	26	5
(Scotland) Steven Pressley	DF	1	0
(Scotland) David Robertson	DF	53	2
(England) Gary Stevens	DF	54	2
(England) Chris Vinnicombe	DF	2	0
(Scotland) Ian Durrant	MF	20	1
(Scotland) Ian Ferguson	MF	22	1
(England) Dale Gordon	MF	28	5
(Netherlands) Pieter Huistra	MF	40	5
(Scotland) Stuart McCall	MF	45	3
(Scotland) Sandy Robertson	MF	7	0
(Scotland) Lee Robertson	MF	1	0
(England) Nigel Spackman	MF	53	1
(England) Trevor Steven	MF	2	1
(England) Mark Hateley	FW	35	23
(Scotland) Mo Johnston	FW	16	10
(Scotland) Ally McCoist	FW	49	39
(Scotland) Gary McSwegan	FW	5	0
(Northern Ireland) John Morrow	FW	3	0
(Soviet Union) (Commonwealth of Independent States) Oleksiy Mykhaylychenko	FW	31	12
(England) Paul Rideout	FW	13	1
(Scotland) John Spencer	FW	11	1

== League table ==
Pos	Team	Pld	W	D	L	GF	GA	GD	Pts	Qualification or relegation
1	Rangers (C)	44	33	6	5	101	31	+70	72	Qualification for the Champions League first round
2	Heart of Midlothian	44	27	9	8	60	37	+23	63	Qualification for the UEFA Cup first round
3	Celtic	44	26	10	8	88	42	+46	62	Qualification for the UEFA Cup first round
4	Dundee United	44	19	13	12	66	50	+16	51	
5	Hibernian	44	16	17	11	53	45	+8	49	Qualification for the UEFA Cup first round

Rules for classification: 1) points; 2) goal difference; 3) number of goals scored.
(C) Champions

== See also ==
- 1991–92 in Scottish football
- 1991–92 Scottish Cup
- 1991–92 Scottish League Cup
- 1991–92 European Cup
- Nine in a row
