= 1992–93 Rangers F.C. season =

Rangers
1992–93 season
- Chairman: David Murray
- Manager: Walter Smith
- Ground: Ibrox Stadium
- Scottish Premier Division: 1st
- Scottish Cup: Winners
- League Cup: Winners
- Champions League: Group stage
- Top goalscorer: League: Ally McCoist (34); All: Ally McCoist (49)
Home colours	Away colours

The 1992–93 season was the 113th season of competitive football by Rangers.

== Overview ==
Rangers played a total of 64 competitive matches during the 1992–93 season. They completed the club's fifth domestic treble. The team finished first in the Scottish Premier Division and collected the fifth of their nine league titles in a row, after winning 33 of their 44 league games.

Influential England international midfielder Trevor Steven returned to Ibrox from Marseille for a fee of £2.4m.

In domestic competition, Aberdeen were Rangers closest challengers. Finishing runners-up in the league and finalists in both cup competitions. The league title was secured with a 1–0 win away to Airdrieonians in North Lanarkshire.

In the cup competitions, they defeated Aberdeen 2–1 in the Scottish Cup final, with goals from Neil Murray and Mark Hateley. The League Cup was also won after extra time, with a 2–1 win over the Dons.

Rangers became the first British club to appear in the newly formed UEFA Champions League after defeating Danish side Lyngby BK and English league Champions Leeds United in a match dubbed the Battle of Britain. Although unbeaten, the club finished second in Group A, one-point behind French champions Marseille, who defeated AC Milan in the final. Marseille were later stripped of their Ligue 1 title due to a match fixing scandal.

== Transfers ==
=== In ===
Date	Player	From	Fee
13 May 1992	(Scotland) Ally Maxwell	(Scotland) Motherwell	£300,000
4 June 1992	(Scotland) Dave McPherson	(Scotland) Heart of Midlothian	£1,100,000
28 July 1992	(England) Trevor Steven	(France) Marseille	£2,400,000

=== Out ===
Date	Player	To	Fee
13 May 1992	(Scotland) David McKellar	Retired	
11 August 1992	(Scotland) John Spencer	(England) Chelsea	£500,000
14 August 1992	(England) Paul Rideout	(England) Everton	£500,000
8 September 1992	(England) Nigel Spackman	(England) Chelsea	£485,000

- Expenditure: ▼£3,800,000
- Income: ▲£1,485,000
- Total loss/gain: ▼£2,315,000

== Results ==
All results are written with Rangers' score first.

=== Scottish Premier Division ===
Date	Opponent	Venue	Result	Attendance	Scorers
1 August 1992	St Johnstone	H	1–0	38,036	McCoist
4 August 1992	Airdrieonians	H	2–0	34,613	Gordon, Hateley
8 August 1992	Hibernian	A	0–0	17,044	
15 August 1992	Dundee	A	3–4	12,807	McCoist (2), Ferguson
22 August 1992	Celtic	H	1–1	43,239	Durrant
29 August 1992	Aberdeen	H	3–1	41,636	Durrant, McCoist, Mikhailichenko
2 September 1992	Motherwell	A	4–1	10,074	Brown, McCoist (3)
12 September 1992	Partick Thistle	A	4–1	18,460	McPherson, McCall, Gough, Hateley
19 September 1992	Heart of Midlothian	H	2–0	41,888	McCall, McCoist
26 September 1992	Dundee United	A	4–0	13,515	Huistra (2), Steven, McCoist
3 October 1992	Falkirk	H	4–0	40,691	McCoist (4)
7 October 1992	St Johnstone	A	5–1	9,532	McCoist (2), Hateley (2), Ferguson
17 October 1992	Hibernian	H	1–0	40,978	McCoist
31 October 1992	Motherwell	H	4–2	38,719	McCoist (3, 1 (pen.)), Brown
7 November 1992	Celtic	A	1–0	51,958	Durrant
11 November 1992	Dundee	H	3–1	33,497	McCoist (2), Hateley
21 November 1992	Heart of Midlothian	A	1–1	20,831	McCoist
28 November 1992	Partick Thistle	H	3–0	40,939	Steven, McSwegan, McPherson
1 December 1992	Airdrieonians	A	1–1	9,251	Brown
12 December 1992	Falkirk	A	2–1	11,585	Hateley, McCoist
19 December 1992	St Johnstone	H	2–0	35,369	Gough, Robertson
26 December 1992	Dundee	A	3–1	13,983	Hateley (2), McCoist
2 January 1993	Celtic	H	1–0	46,039	Steven
5 January 1993	Dundee United	H	3–2	40,239	Hateley, McCall, McCoist
30 January 1993	Hibernian	A	4–3	17,444	Hateley (2), Steven, McCoist
2 February 1993	Aberdeen	A	1–0	15,055	Hateley
9 February 1993	Falkirk	H	5–0	34,780	Hateley (2), Robertson, Steven, Huistra
13 February 1993	Airdrieonians	H	2–2	39,816	McCoist (2)
20 February 1993	Dundee United	A	0–0	13,234	
23 February 1993	Motherwell	A	4–0	14,006	Hateley (2), McCall, Mikhailichenko
27 February 1993	Heart of Midlothian	H	2–1	42,128	McCoist, Robertson
10 March 1993	St Johnstone	A	1–1	9,210	McCoist
13 March 1993	Hibernian	H	3–0	41,076	Hagen, Hateley, McCoist
20 March 1993	Celtic	A	1–2	53,241	Hateley
27 March 1993	Dundee	H	3–0	40,294	McCall, McCoist, Ferguson
30 March 1993	Aberdeen	H	2–0	44,570	Ferguson, McCoist
10 April 1993	Motherwell	H	1–0	41,353	Brown
14 April 1993	Heart of Midlothian	A	3–2	14,622	Hateley (2), McCall
17 April 1993	Partick Thistle	H	3–1	42,636	McSwegan (2), Hagen
1 May 1993	Airdrieonians	A	1–0	11,830	McSwegan
4 May 1993	Partick Thistle	A	0–3	9,834	
8 May 1993	Dundee United	H	1–0	42,917	Huistra
12 May 1993	Aberdeen	A	0–1	13,079	
15 May 1993	Falkirk	A	2–1	8,517	Mikhailichenko, Hateley

=== Scottish League Cup ===
Date	Round	Opponent	Venue	Result	Attendance	Scorers
11 August 1992	R2	Dumbarton	A	5–0	11,091	Durrant, Gordon, Hateley, McCoist, Mikhailichenko
19 August 1992	R3	Stranraer	A	5–0	4,430	Hateley (2), McCoist (3)
26 August 1992	QF	Dundee United	A	3–2	15,716	McCoist, Gough, Huistra
22 September 1992	SF	St Johnstone	N	3–1	30,062	McCoist (3)
25 October 1992	F	Aberdeen	N	2–1*	45,298	McCall, Smith (o.g.)

*Rangers won the match 2–1 in extra-time

=== Scottish Cup ===
Date	Round	Opponent	Venue	Result	Attendance	Scorers
9 January 1993	R3	Motherwell	A	2–0	14,314	McCoist (2)
6 February 1993	R4	Ayr United	A	2–0	13,176	McCoist, Gordon
6 March 1993	QF	Arbroath	A	3–0	6,488	Hateley, Murray, McCoist (pen.)
3 April 1993	SF	Heart of Midlothian	N	2–1	41,738	McPherson, McCoist
29 May 1993	F	Aberdeen	N	2–1	50,715	Murray, Hateley

=== UEFA Champions League ===
Date	Round	Opponent	Venue	Result	Attendance	Scorers
16 September 1992	R1	(Denmark) Lyngby	H	2–0	40,036	Hateley, Huistra
30 September 1992	R1	(Denmark) Lyngby	A	1–0	4,273	Durrant
21 October 1992	R2	(England) Leeds United	H	2–1	43,251	McCoist, Lukic (o.g.)
4 November 1992	R2	(England) Leeds United	A	2–1	25,118	Hateley, McCoist
25 November 1992	GS	(France) Marseille	H	2–2	41,624	McSwegan, Hateley
9 December 1992	GS	(Russia) CSKA Moscow	A	1–0	9,000	Ferguson
3 March 1993	GS	(Belgium) Club Brugge	A	1–1	19,000	Huistra
17 March 1993	GS	(Belgium) Club Brugge	H	2–1	42,731	Durrant, Nisbet
7 April 1993	GS	(France) Marseille	A	1–1	46,000	Durrant
21 April 1993	GS	(Russia) CSKA Moscow	H	0–0	43,142	

== Appearances ==
Player	Position	Appearances	Goals
(Scotland) Andy Goram	GK	52	0
(Scotland) Ally Maxwell	GK	12	0
(Scotland) John Brown	DF	59	4
(Scotland) Richard Gough	DF	39	3
(Ukraine) Oleh Kuznetsov	DF	9	0
(Scotland) Dave McPherson	DF	53	3
(Scotland) Scott Nisbet	DF	17	1
(Scotland) Steven Pressley	DF	11	0
(Scotland) Brian Reid	DF	2	0
(Scotland) David Robertson	DF	58	3
(England) Gary Stevens	DF	10	0
(Scotland) Ian Durrant	MF	47	7
(Scotland) Ian Ferguson	MF	43	5
(England) Dale Gordon	MF	27	3
(Scotland) David Hagen	MF	10	2
(Netherlands) Pieter Huistra	MF	42	7
(Scotland) Stuart McCall	MF	54	6
(Scotland) Neil Murray	MF	23	2
(England) Trevor Steven	MF	36	5
(Scotland) Lee Robertson	MF	1	0
(Scotland) Sandy Robertson	MF	2	0
(England) Nigel Spackman	MF	3	0
(England) Stephen Watson	MF	3	0
(Scotland) Ally McCoist	FW	52	49
(Scotland) Gary McSwegan	FW	14	5
(Ukraine) Oleksiy Mykhaylychenko	FW	39	4
(England) Mark Hateley	FW	54	29
(England) Paul Rideout	FW	2	0

== League table ==
Pos	Team	Pld	W	D	L	GF	GA	GD	Pts	Qualification or relegation
1	Rangers (C)	44	33	7	4	97	35	+62	73	Qualification for the Champions League first round
2	Aberdeen	44	27	10	7	87	36	+51	64	Qualification for the Cup Winners' Cup first round
3	Celtic	44	24	12	8	68	41	+27	60	Qualification for the UEFA Cup first round
4	Dundee United	44	19	9	16	56	49	+7	47	Qualification for the UEFA Cup first round
5	Heart of Midlothian	44	15	14	15	46	51	−5	44	Qualification for the UEFA Cup first round

Source: RSSSF
Rules for classification: 1) points; 2) goal difference; 3) number of goals scored.
(C) Champions

== Champions league table ==
Pos	Team	Pld	W	D	L	GF	GA	GD	Pts	Qualification	MAR	RAN	BRU	CSKA
1	(France) Marseille	6	3	3	0	14	4	+10	9	Advance to final	—	1–1	3–0	6–0
2	(Scotland) Rangers	6	2	4	0	7	5	+2	8		2–2	—	2–1	0–0
3	(Belgium) Club Brugge	6	2	1	3	5	8	−3	5		0–1	1–1	—	1–0
4	(Russia) CSKA Moscow	6	0	2	4	2	11	−9	2		1–1	0–1	1–2	—

Source: UEFA

== See also ==
- 1992–93 in Scottish football
- Nine in a row
