= 1996–97 Rangers F.C. season =

Rangers
1996–97 season
- Chairman: David Murray
- Manager: Walter Smith
- Ground: Ibrox Stadium
- Scottish Premier Division: 1st (champions)
- Scottish Cup: Quarter-finals
- League Cup: Winners
- Champions League: Group stage
- Top goalscorer: League: Brian Laudrup (17); All: Brian Laudrup (21)
Home colours	Away colours

The 1996–97 season was the 117th season of competitive football by Rangers.

== Overview ==
Rangers played a total of 52 competitive matches during the 1996–97 season. The team finished first in the Scottish Premier Division and won its ninth consecutive league title, equalling the long-standing record of their rivals Celtic

In the cup competitions, the team won the Scottish League Cup beating Heart of Midlothian 4–3 in the final. Rangers were knocked out the Scottish Cup by Celtic at the quarter-final stage, losing 2–0.

The side reached the group stages of the UEFA Champions League this season and were drawn into a group with Grasshopper, Auxerre and Ajax.

Between July and March, manager Walter Smith spent almost £10 million on new signings Jörg Albertz, Joachim Björklund and Sebastián Rozental.

Due to the mounting injuries in the second half of the season, striker Mark Hateley briefly returned to the club from Queens Park Rangers. Manchester City goalkeeper Andy Dibble joined on a free transfer as cover for the injured Andy Goram.

== Transfers ==
=== In ===
Date	Name	From	Fee	Source
28 June 1996	(Germany) Jörg Albertz	(Germany) Hamburger SV	£4,000,000	
5 July 1996	(Sweden) Joachim Björklund	(Italy) Vicenza	£2,000,000	
13 December 1996	(Chile) Sebastián Rozental	(Chile) Universidad Catolica	£3,500,000	
10 March 1997	(Wales) Andy Dibble	(England) Manchester City	Free	
14 March 1997	(England) Mark Hateley	(England) Queens Park Rangers	£300,000	

=== Out ===
Date	Name	From	Fee
15 May 1996	(Ukraine) Oleksiy Mykhaylychenko	Retired	
15 May 1996	(Scotland) Billy Thomson	(Scotland) Dundee	Free
31 May 1996	(Scotland) Colin Scott	(Scotland) Hamilton Academical	Free
31 May 1996	(Northern Ireland) John Morrow	(England) Oldham Athletic	Free
5 February 1997	(Scotland) Neil Murray	(Switzerland) FC Sion	£200,000

- Expenditure: ▼£9,800,000
- Income: ▲£200,000
- Total loss/gain: ▼£9,600,000

== Results ==
All results are written with Rangers' score first.

=== Scottish Premier Division ===
Date	Opponent	Venue	Result	Attendance	Scorers
10 August 1996	Raith Rovers	H	1–0	46,221	Steven
17 August 1996	Dunfermline Athletic	A	5–2	16,782	McCoist (3, 1 (pen.)), Van Vossen (2)
24 August 1996	Dundee United	H	1–0	48,285	Gascoigne
7 September 1996	Motherwell	A	1–0	12,288	Gough
14 September 1996	Heart of Midlothian	H	3–0	47,240	Durie, Gascoigne, McCoist
21 September 1996	Kilmarnock	A	4–1	14,812	Gascoigne (2, 1 (pen.)), Van Vossen (2)
28 September 1996	Celtic	H	2–0	50,124	Gough, Gascoigne
12 October 1996	Hibernian	A	1–2	12,436	Albertz
19 October 1996	Aberdeen	H	2–2	50,076	Gascoigne, Laudrup (pen.)
26 October 1996	Motherwell	H	5–0	48,160	Gascoigne (3), Laudrup (2)
2 November 1996	Raith Rovers	A	2–2	9,722	Van Vossen, McCoist
14 November 1996	Celtic	A	1–0	50,009	Laudrup
1 December 1996	Aberdeen	A	3–0	19,168	Robertson, Laudrup, Miller
7 December 1996	Hibernian	H	4–3	48,053	McCoist (2), Ian Ferguson, Laudrup
10 December 1996	Dundee United	A	0–1	12,417	
14 December 1996	Dunfermline Athletic	H	3–1	45,878	McCoist, Gough, Andersen
17 December 1996	Kilmarnock	H	4–2	39,469	Andersen (3), Robertson
21 December 1996	Heart of Midlothian	A	4–1	15,139	Robertson, Laudrup, Albertz (pen.), Gascoigne
28 December 1996	Raith Rovers	H	4–0	48,322	Gough, Gascoigne, Albertz, McCoist
2 January 1997	Celtic	H	3–1	50,019	Andersen (2), Albertz
4 January 1997	Hibernian	A	2–1	12,650	Andersen, Albertz (pen.)
12 January 1997	Aberdeen	H	4–0	47,509	Andersen (2), Albertz (pen.), Laudrup
15 January 1997	Kilmarnock	A	1–1	15,662	Gascoigne
18 January 1997	Motherwell	A	3–1	13,166	Albertz, Laudrup, Gascoigne
1 February 1997	Heart of Midlothian	H	0–0	50,024	
8 February 1997	Dunfermline Athletic	A	3–0	16,153	Durie, Albertz, Laudrup
23 February 1997	Hibernian	H	3–1	47,618	Gough, Albertz, Laudrup
1 March 1997	Aberdeen	A	2–2	16,331	Laudrup, Moore
12 March 1997	Dundee United	H	0–2	50,002	
16 March 1997	Celtic	A	1–0	49,733	Laudrup
22 March 1997	Kilmarnock	H	1–2	50,036	Durie
5 April 1997	Dunfermline Athletic	H	4–0	50,098	Albertz, Petric, Laudrup, Hateley
15 April 1997	Raith Rovers	A	6–0	9,745	Durie (2), Petric, Robertson, Laudrup, McCoist
5 May 1997	Motherwell	H	0–2	50,059	
7 May 1997	Dundee United	A	1–0	12,180	Laudrup
10 May 1997	Heart of Midlothian	A	1–3	13,097	McInnes

=== Scottish League Cup ===
Date	Round	Opponent	Venue	Result	Attendance	Scorers
14 August 1996	R2	Clydebank	A	3–0	7,450	Van Vossen (2), McCoist
4 September 1996	R3	Ayr United	H	3–1	44,732	Albertz, Gascoigne, McInnes
17 September 1996	QF	Hibernian	H	4–0	45,104	Van Vossen (2), Durie, Albertz
22 October 1996	SF	Dunfermline Athletic	N	6–1	16,791	Laudrup (2), Andersen (2), McInnes, Albertz
24 November 1996	F	Heart of Midlothian	N	4–3	48,559	McCoist (2), Gascoigne (2)

=== Scottish Cup ===
Date	Round	Opponent	Venue	Result	Attendance	Scorers
25 January 1997	R3	St Johnstone	H	2–0	45,037	Andersen, Rozental
15 February 1997	R4	East Fife	H	3–0	41,064	Robertson, Steven, McCoist
6 March 1997	QF	Celtic	A	0–2	49,284	

=== UEFA Champions League ===
Date	Round	Opponent	Venue	Result	Attendance	Scorers
7 August 1996	QR	(Russia) Alania Vladikavkaz	H	3–1	44,799	McInnes, McCoist, Petric
21 August 1996	QR	(Russia) Alania Vladikavkaz	A	7–2	32,000	McCoist (3), Laudrup (2), Van Vossen, Miller
11 September 1996	GS	(Switzerland) Grasshopper	A	0–3	20,030	
25 September 1996	GS	(France) Auxerre	H	1–2	37,344	Gascoigne
16 October 1996	GS	(Netherlands) Ajax	A	1–4	47,000	Durrant
30 October 1996	GS	(Netherlands) Ajax	H	0–1	42,265	
20 November 1996	GS	(Switzerland) Grasshopper	H	2–1	34,192	McCoist (2, 1 (pen.))
4 December 1996	GS	(France) Auxerre	A	1–2	21,300	Gough

== Appearances ==
Player	Position	Appearances	Goals
(Wales) Andy Dibble	GK	7	0
(Scotland) Andy Goram	GK	38	0
(Netherlands) Theo Snelders	GK	7	0
(Sweden) Joachim Björklund	DF	40	0
(Scotland) Alec Cleland	DF	45	0
(Scotland) Richard Gough	DF	41	6
(Scotland) Alan McLaren	DF	20	0
(Australia) Craig Moore	DF	31	1
(Federal Republic of Yugoslavia) Gordan Petric	DF	40	3
(Scotland) David Robertson	DF	30	5
(Scotland) Greg Shields	DF	10	0
(Scotland) Scott Wilson	DF	4	0
(Scotland) Stephen Wright	DF	2	0
(Germany) Jorg Albertz	MF	47	13
(Scotland) Steven Boyack	MF	1	0
(Scotland) Ian Durrant	MF	16	1
(Scotland) Barry Ferguson	MF	1	0
(Scotland) Ian Ferguson	MF	31	1
(England) Paul Gascoigne	MF	34	17
(Denmark) Brian Laudrup	MF	43	20
(Scotland) Stuart McCall	MF	13	0
(Scotland) Brian McGinty	MF	1	0
(Scotland) Derek McInnes	MF	33	4
(Scotland) Charlie Miller	MF	21	2
(England) Trevor Steven	MF	10	2
(Denmark) Erik Bo Andersen	FW	25	12
(Scotland) Gordon Durie	FW	24	6
(Northern Ireland) Darren Fitzgerald	FW	1	0
(England) Mark Hateley	FW	4	1
(Scotland) Ally McCoist	FW	37	20
(Northern Ireland) Paul McKnight	FW	1	0
(Chile) Sebastián Rozental	FW	2	1
(Netherlands) Peter van Vossen	FW	26	9

== Competitions ==
=== Overall ===
Competition	First match	Last match	Starting round	Final position	Record							
Competition	First match	Last match	Starting round	Final position	Pld	W	D	L	GF	GA	GD	Win %
Scottish Premier Division	10 August	10 May		Winners	36	25	5	6	85	33	+52	69.44
UEFA Champions League	7 August	4 December	Qualifying round	Group stage	8	3	0	5	15	16	−1	37.50
Scottish Cup	25 January	6 March	Third round	Quarter-finals	3	2	0	1	5	2	+3	66.67
Scottish League Cup	14 August	24 November	Second round	Winners	5	5	0	0	20	5	+15	100.00
Total					52	35	5	12	125	56	+69	67.31

Source: Competitions

=== Scottish Premier Division ===
Pos	Team	Pld	W	D	L	GF	GA	GD	Pts	Qualification or relegation
1	Rangers (C)	36	25	5	6	85	33	+52	80	Qualification for the Champions League first qualifying round
2	Celtic	36	23	6	7	78	32	+46	75	Qualification for the UEFA Cup first qualifying round (Note: As the League Cup winners Rangers had qualified for European competition via their league position, the place in the UEFA Cup was passed to the next highest placed team in the league, Dundee United.)
3	Dundee United	36	17	9	10	46	33	+13	60	Qualification for the UEFA Cup first qualifying round
4	Heart of Midlothian	36	14	10	12	46	43	+3	52	
5	Dunfermline Athletic	36	12	9	15	52	65	−13	45	

Source: Soccerbase
Rules for classification: 1) Points; 2) Goal difference; 3) Goals scored
(C) Champions

=== UEFA Champions League ===
Pos	Team	Pld	W	D	L	GF	GA	GD	Pts	Qualification	AUX	AJX	GRA	RAN
1	(France) Auxerre	6	4	0	2	8	7	+1	12	Advance to knockout stage	—	0–1	1–0	2–1
2	(Netherlands) Ajax	6	4	0	2	8	4	+4	12	Advance to knockout stage	1–2	—	0–1	4–1
3	(Switzerland) Grasshopper	6	3	0	3	8	5	+3	9		3–1	0–1	—	3–0
4	(Scotland) Rangers	6	1	0	5	5	13	−8	3		1–2	0–1	2–1	—

Source: UEFA
