= 1993 Scottish Cup final =

- Event: 1992–93 Scottish Cup
Rangers	Aberdeen
2	1
- Date: 29 May 1993
- Venue: Celtic Park, Glasgow
- Referee: Jim McCluskey
- Attendance: 50,715

The 1993 Scottish Cup final was played between Rangers and Aberdeen at Celtic Park on 29 May 1993. Owing to ground reconstruction at Hampden Park, the fixture was played at another stadium for the first time since 1924.

Rangers won the match 2–1, thereby securing a domestic treble. Rangers' scorers were Mark Hateley, scoring in his second consecutive Scottish Cup final, and Neil Murray. Lee Richardson scored Aberdeen's goal.

== Match details ==
29 May 1993

Rangers	2 – 1	Aberdeen
Murray 23'; Hateley 43'	Report	Richardson 77'

Celtic Park, Glasgow
Attendance: 50,715
Referee: Jim McCluskey

RANGERS:
GK	1	(Scotland) Andy Goram
DF	6	(Scotland) John Brown
DF	4	(Scotland) Richard Gough (c)
DF	5	(Scotland) Dave McPherson
DF	3	(Scotland) David Robertson
CM	2	(Scotland) Stuart McCall
CM	8	(Scotland) Ian Ferguson
RM	7	(Scotland) Neil Murray
FW	9	(Scotland) Ian Durrant
LW	11	(Netherlands) Pieter Huistra	(substituted off) 88'
FW	10	(England) Mark Hateley
Substitutes:
DF		(Scotland) Steven Pressley	(substituted on) 88'
FW		(Scotland) Gary McSwegan
Manager:
(Scotland) Walter Smith

ABERDEEN:
GK	1	(Netherlands) Theo Snelders
DF	2	(Scotland) Stewart McKimmie
DF	3	(Scotland) Stephen Wright	(substituted off) 63'
DF	5	(Scotland) Brian Irvine
DF	6	(Scotland) Alex McLeish (c)
MF	4	(Scotland) Brian Grant
MF	7	(England) Lee Richardson
MF	8	(England) Paul Mason
FW	9	(Scotland) Scott Booth
FW	10	(Scotland) Duncan Shearer	(substituted off) 75'
FW	11	(Finland) Mixu Paatelainen
Substitutes:
DF		(Scotland) Gary Smith	(substituted on) 63'
FW		(Scotland) Eoin Jess	(substituted on) 75'
Manager:
(Scotland) Willie Miller

== See also ==
- Aberdeen F.C.–Rangers F.C. rivalry
