= 1992–93 Airdrieonians F.C. season =

Airdrieonians
1992–93 season
- Manager: Alex MacDonald
- Stadium: Broomfield Park
- Scottish Premier Division: 12th (relegated)
- Scottish Cup: Third round
- Scottish League Cup: Second round
- Highest home attendance: 12,514 vs Rangers, Premier Division, 1 May 1993
- Lowest home attendance: 1,494 vs Stranraer, League Cup, 11 August 1992
- Average home league attendance: 4,520

During the 1992–93 season, Airdrieonians competed in the Scottish Premier Division, in which they finished 12th and were subsequently relegated to the Scottish First Division.

== Scottish Premier Division ==
=== League table ===
Pos	Team	Pld	W	D	L	GF	GA	GD	Pts	Qualification or relegation
8	Partick Thistle	44	12	12	20	50	71	−21	36	
9	Motherwell	44	11	13	20	46	62	−16	35	
10	Dundee	44	11	12	21	48	68	−20	34	
11	Falkirk (R)	44	11	7	26	60	86	−26	29	Relegation to the 1993–94 Scottish First Division
12	Airdrieonians (R)	44	6	17	21	35	70	−35	29	Relegation to the 1993–94 Scottish First Division

Source: RSSSF
Rules for classification: 1) points; 2) goal difference; 3) number of goals scored.
(R) Relegated

=== Matches ===
Win	Draw	Loss

Scottish Premier Division results
Date	Opponent	Venue	Result F–A	Scorers	Attendance
1 August 1992	Partick Thistle	A	0–1		4,483
4 August 1992	Rangers	A	0–2		36,613
8 August 1992	Dundee	H	0–0		2,510
15 August 1992	St Johnstone	A	0–3		3,708
22 August 1992	Falkirk	H	2–0	Honor, Lawrence	3,900
29 August 1992	Celtic	H	1–1	Boyle	12,222
2 September 1992	Aberdeen	A	0–0		9,021
12 September 1992	Dundee United	H	1–2	Coyle	2,773
19 September 1992	Hibernian	A	2–2	Boyle (2, 1 pen.)	6,909
26 September 1992	Heart of Midlothian	H	1–0	Coyle	4,372
3 October 1992	Motherwell	A	0–2		4,720
10 October 1992	Partick Thistle	H	2–2	Coyle, Jack (pen.)	4,204
17 October 1992	Dundee	A	0–2		3,831
24 October 1992	Celtic	A	0–2		19,549
31 October 1992	Aberdeen	H	1–2	Balfour	3,221
7 November 1992	Falkirk	A	1–5	Kirkwood (pen.)	4,715
14 November 1992	St Johnstone	H	0–2		2,550
21 November 1992	Hibernian	H	2–0	Honor (pen.), Coyle	3,129
28 November 1992	Dundee United	A	0–0		5,178
1 December 1992	Rangers	H	1–1	Boyle	9,251
5 December 1992	Heart of Midlothian	A	3–1	Coyle, Jack, Lawrence	6,685
12 December 1992	Motherwell	H	0–2		3,630
19 December 1992	Partick Thistle	A	1–1	Jack (pen.)	3,274
26 December 1992	St Johnstone	A	0–1		4,139
2 January 1993	Falkirk	H	0–1		5,748
16 January 1993	Aberdeen	A	0–7		8,805
23 January 1993	Celtic	H	0–1		7,473
30 January 1993	Dundee	H	2–2	Kirkwood (pen.), Smith	2,203
6 February 1993	Motherwell	A	0–0		5,382
13 February 1993	Rangers	A	2–2	Coyle (2)	39,816
20 February 1993	Heart of Midlothian	H	0–0		3,347
27 February 1993	Hibernian	A	1–3	Black	5,011
6 March 1993	Dundee United	H	1–3	Fashanu	2,291
9 March 1993	Partick Thistle	H	2–2	Honor, Coyle	3,080
13 March 1993	Dundee	A	1–1	Smith	2,929
20 March 1993	Falkirk	A	1–0	Smith	4,172
27 March 1993	St Johnstone	H	1–1	Coyle	2,339
6 April 1993	Celtic	A	0–4		10,671
10 April 1993	Aberdeen	H	1–1	Fashanu	3,005
17 April 1993	Dundee United	A	0–3		4,200
20 April 1993	Hibernian	H	3–1	Fashanu (2), Stewart	2,585
1 May 1993	Rangers	H	0–1		12,514
8 May 1993	Heart of Midlothian	A	1–1	Smith	5,104
15 May 1993	Motherwell	H	1–2	Fashanu	3,088

== Scottish Cup ==
Win	Draw	Loss

Scottish Cup results
Round	Date	Opponent	Venue	Result F–A	Scorers	Attendance
Third round	9 January 1993	Clydebank	H	0–0		2,500
Third round replay	19 January 1993	Clydebank	A	0–2		1,979

== Scottish League Cup ==
Win	Draw	Loss

Scottish League Cup results
Round	Date	Opponent	Venue	Result F–A	Scorers	Attendance
Second round	11 August 1992	Stranraer	H	2–3 (a.e.t.)	Conn, Kirkwood	1,494
