= Mark Hateley =

English footballer

- Hateley with England in 1986

Personal information
- Full name: Mark Wayne Hateley
- Date of birth: 7 November 1961 (age 64)
- Place of birth: Derby, Derbyshire, England
- Height: 6 ft 3 in (1.91 m)
- Position: Striker

Youth career
- Nottingham Forest

Senior career*
Years	Team	Apps	(Gls)
1978–1983	Coventry City	93	(25)
1980	→ Detroit Express (loan)	19	(2)
1983–1984	Portsmouth	38	(22)
1984–1987	AC Milan	66	(17)
1987–1990	Monaco	59	(22)
1990–1995	Rangers	165	(87)
1995–1997	Queens Park Rangers	27	(3)
1996	→ Leeds United (loan)	6	(0)
1997	Rangers	4	(1)
1997–1998	Hull City	21	(3)
1999	Ross County	2	(0)
Total		500	(182)

International career
1979–1980	England Youth	7	(5)
1982–1984	England U21	10	(8)
1984–1992	England	32	(9)

Managerial career
- 1997–1998: Hull City
- * Club domestic league appearances and goals

Mark Wayne Hateley (born 7 November 1961) is an English former professional footballer who played as a striker. He started his career with Coventry City in the First Division of English football. A spell followed at English Second Division club Portsmouth, where he ended the 1983–84 season as the club's top goalscorer. He then moved to Italian club AC Milan, where he suffered several injuries (requiring four operations); however, he did score the winning goal against city rivals Inter Milan in 1984.

In 1987, Hateley signed for French club Monaco, winning Ligue 1 in his first season at the Monegasque club. In 1990, he signed for Scottish Premier Division club Rangers. In his five-year spell in Glasgow, he was a part of a title-winning squad in every season, and he attained personal success in the 1993–94 season, as he was voted both the SFWA Footballer of the Year and the SPFA Players' Player of the Year, as well as the league's top goalscorer with 22 goals. He briefly rejoined the club in 1997, as there were no available forwards for the Old Firm match, but was sent off on his second debut. In 1999, Hateley was named as part of Rangers' greatest-ever team, and in 2003 he was inducted to Rangers' Hall of Fame.

From 1984 to 1992, Hateley made 32 appearances for the England national team, scoring nine goals. He was a member of the squads for the 1986 FIFA World Cup and UEFA Euro 1988.

== Early life ==
Hateley was born in Derby on 7 November 1961. His father, Tony, was also a professional footballer who played as a striker for clubs such as Notts County, Aston Villa, Chelsea, Liverpool and Coventry City.

== Club career ==
Hateley trained with Nottingham Forest whilst still at school; however, he was rejected by then-manager Brian Clough, who did not believe he was sufficiently talented. Upon leaving school, he joined Coventry City and started his career in professional football, playing over 90 games in the First Division before moving to Portsmouth in the Second Division in the summer of 1983. He scored 22 league goals for them in the 1983–84 season.

On 28 June 1984, he was transferred to AC Milan for £1 million. He scored a decisive and historic match-winning headed goal in a 2–1 win against Inter in the Milan Derby on 28 October 1984; this was the first time Milan had defeated Inter in the Derby in six years.

Arsène Wenger then brought Hateley to AS Monaco, his first signing for the club, in 1987 and he was part of the team which won the French Division 1 title in the 1987–88 season. Ayrton Senna lived in the apartment below him, and Boris Becker lived next door, during part of his time in Monaco. Senna played five-a-side football with Hateley.

After three years at Monaco, at the age of 28, Hateley returned to Britain in a £1 million move to Rangers on 19 July 1990, taking an 80% wage reduction compared to his pay at Milan. Manager Graeme Souness had attempted to bring him to Ibrox three years earlier from Milan. Hateley became a key part of the Rangers side, and was voted player of the year by the Scottish Football Writers in the 1993–94 season. He scored 112 goals for the Gers in all competitions, including two that clinched the championship on the final day in 1991 and one in each of the narrow Scottish Cup final victories in 1992 and 1993. Rangers were league champions in every season that Hateley played for them (scoring 85 Scottish Premier Division goals in the process), as they went on a run of nine successive titles, which lasted from 1989 until 1997.

Regarding his strike partnership at Rangers with Ally McCoist, Hateley said: "Alistair was the perfect partner for me. As a finisher, he was an unbelievable goal scorer. It was a great partnership." In the 1992–93 season, Rangers scored 97 goals. McCoist won the European Golden Boot, with 49 of them, and Hateley scored 29. He finished in third place for the SFWA award in 1993.

After making 218 appearances for Rangers, he moved to Queens Park Rangers in November 1995, for a fee of £1.5 million. He had just recovered from having concurrent operations on his knee and ankle. Hateley said in 2021: "My dad always said to never make a decision when injured, or in ill-health, because invariably it will be the wrong decision, an emotional decision. I knew after literally ten days that it was the wrong move."

In early 1997, with Rangers trying to win their ninth title in a row and with a long injury list, manager Walter Smith desperately needed a striker, and re-signed Hateley for £300,000 to play in the vital game against Rangers' biggest rivals Celtic. Rangers won the game 1–0, but Hateley was sent off for headbutting Stewart Kerr. He played four times in his second spell at Rangers, scoring once, and transferred to Hull City in July 1997, where he fulfilled the role of player-manager. Hateley managed Hull from the summer of 1997 until November 1998.

Hateley ended his playing career with Ross County in September 1999, playing two games for them. He later said: "It was a great time. I really did enjoy myself up there. It was a logistic nightmare for me, because I was staying down in Derby and going through a divorce. I was having to fly from East Midlands into Glasgow and then I had twenty minutes to make a connection to get up there, and I could never make it."

== International career ==
Hateley with England in 1985

On 2 June 1984, Hateley was capped for England at senior level for the first time in a 2–0 friendly defeat to the Soviet Union. In his next game, eight days later, he scored in a 2–0 victory over Brazil, to date England's only away victory against Brazil. By the end of 1984, he had been capped six times by England and scored three goals. He played a significant role in England's successful qualifying campaign for the 1986 FIFA World Cup, scoring important goals against Finland and Northern Ireland.

However England started slowly in the tournament itself and after two disappointing results (a defeat against Portugal and a draw against Morocco), Hateley was among players dropped, being replaced by Peter Beardsley. England won their next match against Poland and Hateley thereafter fell out of favour. He made the last of his 32 appearances in a 2–2 friendly draw with Czechoslovakia in 1992.

== Style of play ==
A traditional target man, Hateley was a physical centre-forward who was known in particular for his strength in the air and ability to score goals with his head.

== Personal life ==
Hateley has been married twice, and has four children from his first marriage. Hateley's son Tom, who was born in Monaco during his father's spell at AS Monaco, is also a footballer.

Paul Gascoigne lived with Hateley for two weeks, after signing for Rangers in July 1995, for a club-record £4.3 million.

In 2021, Hateley released his autobiography Hitting the Mark: My Story.

== Career statistics ==
=== Club ===
Appearances and goals by club, season and competition
Club	Season	League			National cup (Note: Includes FA Cup, Coppa Italia, Coupe de France, Scottish Cup)		League cup (Note: Includes Football League Cup, Scottish League Cup)		Continental		Total	
Club	Season	Division	Apps	Goals	Apps	Goals	Apps	Goals	Apps	Goals	Apps	Goals
Coventry City	1978–79	First Division	1	0	0	0	0	0	–		1	0
Coventry City	1979–80	First Division	4	0	1	0	0	0	–		5	0
Coventry City	1980–81	First Division	19	3	3	0	6	2	–		28	5
Coventry City	1981–82	First Division	34	13	4	4	2	1	–		40	18
Coventry City	1982–83	First Division	35	9	3	2	0	0	–		38	11
Coventry City	Total		93	25	11	6	8	3	—		112	34
Detroit Express (loan)	1980	NASL	19	2	–		–		–		19	2
Portsmouth	1983–84	Second Division	38	22	2	1	4	2	–		44	25
Milan	1984–85	Serie A	21	7	7	1	–		–		28	8
Milan	1985–86	Serie A	22	8	4	1	–		4 (Note: Appearances in UEFA Cup)	2	30	11
Milan	1986–87	Serie A	23	2	5	0	–		–		28	2
Milan	Total		66	17	16	2	—		4	2	86	21
Monaco	1987–88	Ligue 1	28	14	3	0	–		–		31	14
Monaco	1988–89	Ligue 1	18	6	1	1	–		2 (Note: Appearances in European Cup)	0	21	7
Monaco	1989–90	Ligue 1	13	2	1	1	–		2	0	16	3
Monaco	Total		59	22	5	2	—		4	0	68	24
Rangers	1990–91	Scottish Premier Division	33	10	3	2	4	2	2	1	42	15
Rangers	1991–92	Scottish Premier Division	30	21	2	2	2	0	1	0	35	23
Rangers	1992–93	Scottish Premier Division	37	19	5	2	4	3	8 (Note: Appearances in UEFA Champions League)	3	54	27
Rangers	1993–94	Scottish Premier Division	42	22	6	4	5	2	2	2	55	30
Rangers	1994–95	Scottish Premier Division	23	13	1	0	2	2	2	0	28	15
Rangers	1995–96	Scottish Premier Division	0	0	0	0	2	2	2	0	4	2
Rangers	Total		165	85	17	10	19	11	17	6	218	112
Queens Park Rangers	1995–96	Premier League	14	2	1	0	1	0	–		16	2
Queens Park Rangers	1996–97	Division One	13	1	4	2	0	0	–		17	3
Queens Park Rangers	Total		27	3	5	2	1	0	—		33	5
Leeds United (loan)	1996–97	Premier League	6	0	0	0	0	0	–		6	0
Rangers	1996–97	Scottish Premier Division	4	1	0	0	0	0	0	0	4	1
Hull City	1997–98	Division Three	9	0	0	0	5	0	–		14	0
Hull City	1998–99	Division Three	12	3	0	0	1	0	–		13	3
Hull City	Total		21	3	0	0	6	0	—		27	3
Ross County	1999–2000	Scottish Second Division	2	0	0	0	0	0	–		2	0
Career total			500	180	56	23	38	16	25	8	619	227

=== International ===
Appearances and goals by national team and year
National team	Year	Apps	Goals
England	1984	6	3
England	1985	8	3
England	1986	7	3
England	1987	4	0
England	1988	6	0
England	1992	1	0
Total		32	9

Scores and results list England's goal tally first, score column indicates score after each Hateley goal.

List of international goals scored by Mark Hateley
No.	Date	Venue	Opponent	Score	Result	Competition
1	10 June 1984	Maracanã Stadium, Rio de Janeiro, Brazil	Brazil	2–0	2–0	Friendly
2	17 October 1984	Wembley Stadium, London, England	Finland	1–0	5–0	1986 FIFA World Cup qualification
3	17 October 1984	Wembley Stadium, London, England	Finland	3–0	5–0	1986 FIFA World Cup qualification
4	27 February 1985	Windsor Park, Belfast, Northern Ireland	Northern Ireland	1–0	1–0	1986 FIFA World Cup qualification
5	22 May 1985	Helsinki Olympic Stadium, Helsinki, Finland	Finland	1–1	1–1	1986 FIFA World Cup qualification
6	6 June 1985	Estadio Azteca, Mexico City, Mexico	Italy	1–1	1–2	Ciudad de México Cup
7	17 May 1986	Los Angeles Memorial Coliseum, Los Angeles, United States	Mexico	1–0	3–0	Friendly
8	17 May 1986	Los Angeles Memorial Coliseum, Los Angeles, United States	Mexico	2–0	3–0	Friendly
9	24 May 1986	Swangard Stadium, Burnaby, Canada	Canada	1–0	1–0	Friendly

=== Managerial stats ===
Team	Nat	From	To	Record				
Team	Nat	From	To	G	W	D	L	Win %
Hull City	(England)	15 July 1997	11 November 1998	76	17	14	45	22.37

== Honours ==
Monaco

- Ligue 1: 1987–88

Rangers

- Scottish Premier League: 1990–91, 1991–92, 1992–93, 1993–94, 1994–95, 1996–97
- Scottish Cup: 1991–92, 1992–93
- Scottish League Cup: 1990–91, 1992–93, 1993–94

England U21

- European Under-21 Football Championship: 1982, 1984

Individual

- Serie A Team of The Year: 1985
- SFWA Footballer of the Year: 1993–94
- SPFA Players' Player of the Year: 1993–94
- UEFA European Under-21 Football Championship Golden Player: 1984
- SPFA Team of the Year: 1994
- Ballon d'Or: 1987 (14th), 1985 (29th), 1984 (22nd)
