= Neil Murray =

Neil Murray is the name of:

- Neil Murray (British musician) (born 1950), British musician who has played bass for a number of notable rock bands
- Neil Murray (Australian musician) (born 1956), Australian singer/songwriter who has worked solo and as a member of the Warumpi Band
- Neil Murray (footballer) (born 1973), former footballer
