= Lewis Goram =

Scottish footballer

Personal information
- Full name: Lewis Albert Goram
- Date of birth: 2 July 1926
- Place of birth: Edinburgh, Scotland
- Date of death: January 1989 (aged 63)
- Place of death: Bury, England
- Position: Goalkeeper

Senior career*
Years	Team	Apps	(Gls)
1947–1948	Leith Athletic	17	(0)
1948–1949	Hibernian	0	(0)
1949–1950	Third Lanark	9	(0)
1950–1959	Bury	114	(0)
1959	Macclesfield Town	5	(0)
1959–1961	Mossley	?	(0)
1961–1963	Buxton	?	(?)
Total		145	(0)
- * Club domestic league appearances and goals

Lewis Albert Goram (2 July 1926 – January 1989) was a Scottish professional football goalkeeper. He played in the Scottish Football League for Leith Athletic and Third Lanark and in the English Football League for Bury.

Goram played for Leith Athletic before joining Hibernian in 1948. He did not play for the Hibernian first team and moved to Third Lanark in 1949, featuring in 9 league games. In 1950 he moved to Bury where he played 114 league games. On leaving Bury he played for Mossley and Buxton before retiring from the game.

His son, Andy, was also a professional football goalkeeper who won 43 caps for Scotland. He also has a daughter, Diane, with his first wife June.
