= 1992–93 Scottish Premier Division =

87th season of top-tier football league in Scotland

Scottish Premier Division
- Season: 1992–93
- Champions: Rangers; 8th Premier Division title 43rd Scottish title
- Relegated: Falkirk; Airdrieonians
- Champions League: Rangers
- Cup Winners' Cup: Aberdeen
- UEFA Cup: Celtic; Dundee United; Heart of Midlothian
- Matches: 264
- Goals: 699 (2.65 per match)
- Top goalscorer: Ally McCoist (34)

The 1992–93 Scottish Premier Division season ended in success for the Rangers who won the title by nine points from nearest rivals Aberdeen and 13 points above third place rival Celtic to clinch five titles in a row. Falkirk and Airdrieonians finished 11th and 12th respectively and were relegated to the First Division.

== Clubs ==
=== Stadia and locations ===
Location of clubs in the 1992–93 Scottish Premier Division

Team	Location	Stadium
Aberdeen	Aberdeen	Pittodrie Stadium
Airdrieonians	Airdrie	Broomfield Park
Celtic	Parkhead, Glasgow	Celtic Park
Dundee	Dundee	Dens Park
Dundee United	Dundee	Tannadice Park
Falkirk	Falkirk	Brockville Park
Heart of Midlothian	Gorgie, Edinburgh	Tynecastle Park
Hibernian	Leith, Edinburgh	Easter Road
Motherwell	Motherwell	Fir Park
Partick Thistle	Maryhill, Glasgow	Firhill Stadium
Rangers	Ibrox, Glasgow	Ibrox Park
St Johnstone	Perth	McDiarmid Park

=== Managers ===
Team	Manager
Aberdeen	(Scotland) Willie Miller
Airdrieonians	(Scotland) Alex MacDonald
Celtic	(Republic of Ireland) Liam Brady
Dundee	(England) Simon Stainrod
Dundee United	(Scotland) Jim McLean
Falkirk	(Scotland) Jim Jefferies
Heart of Midlothian	(Scotland) Sandy Clark
Hibernian	(Scotland) Alex Miller
Motherwell	(Scotland) Tommy McLean
Partick Thistle	(Scotland) John Lambie
Rangers	(Scotland) Walter Smith
St Johnstone	(Northern Ireland) John McClelland

==== Managerial changes ====
Team	Outgoing manager	Date of vacancy	Manner of departure	Incoming manager	Date of appointment
St Johnstone	(Scotland) Alex Totten	14 December 1992	Sacked	(Northern Ireland) John McClelland	December 1992
Heart of Midlothian	(Scotland) Joe Jordan	3 May 1993	Sacked	(Scotland) Sandy Clark	3 May 1993

== League table ==
Pos	Team	Pld	W	D	L	GF	GA	GD	Pts	Qualification or relegation
1	Rangers (C)	44	33	7	4	97	35	+62	73	Qualification for the Champions League first round
2	Aberdeen	44	27	10	7	87	36	+51	64	Qualification for the Cup Winners' Cup first round
3	Celtic	44	24	12	8	68	41	+27	60	Qualification for the UEFA Cup first round
4	Dundee United	44	19	9	16	56	49	+7	47	Qualification for the UEFA Cup first round
5	Heart of Midlothian	44	15	14	15	46	51	−5	44	Qualification for the UEFA Cup first round
6	St Johnstone	44	10	20	14	52	66	−14	40	
7	Hibernian	44	12	13	19	54	64	−10	37	
8	Partick Thistle	44	12	12	20	50	71	−21	36	
9	Motherwell	44	11	13	20	46	62	−16	35	
10	Dundee	44	11	12	21	48	68	−20	34	
11	Falkirk (R)	44	11	7	26	60	86	−26	29	Relegation to the 1993–94 Scottish First Division
12	Airdrieonians (R)	44	6	17	21	35	70	−35	29	Relegation to the 1993–94 Scottish First Division

Source: RSSSF
Rules for classification: 1) points; 2) goal difference; 3) number of goals scored.
(C) Champions; (R) Relegated

== Results ==
=== Matches 1–22 ===
During matches 1-22 each team plays every other team twice (home and away).

Home \ Away	ABE	AIR	CEL	DND	DNU	FAL	HOM	HIB	MOT	PAR	RAN	STJ
Aberdeen		0–0	1–1	2–1	0–1	3–1	6–2	3–0	2–0	2–0	0–1	3–0
Airdrieonians	1–2		1–1	0–0	1–2	2–0	1–0	2–0	0–2	2–2	1–1	0–2
Celtic	2–2	2–0		1–0	2–0	3–2	1–1	2–3	1–1	1–2	0–1	3–1
Dundee	1–2	2–0	0–1		1–3	1–2	1–3	1–1	2–1	0–2	4–3	1–1
Dundee United	2–2	0–0	1–1	0–1		2–0	1–1	1–0	1–1	2–1	0–4	2–1
Falkirk	0–1	5–1	4–5	2–2	1–1		2–1	2–1	1–0	0–1	1–2	2–2
Heart of Midlothian	1–0	1–3	0–1	1–0	1–0	3–0		1–0	1–0	2–1	1–1	1–1
Hibernian	1–3	2–2	1–2	0–0	2–1	3–1	0–0		2–2	1–0	0–0	3–1
Motherwell	2–1	2–0	1–3	1–3	0–1	3–1	1–3	1–2		0–2	1–4	3–3
Partick Thistle	0–7	1–0	2–3	6–3	0–1	1–2	1–1	2–2	2–2		1–4	1–0
Rangers	3–1	2–0	1–1	3–1	3–2	4–0	2–0	1–0	4–2	3–0		1–0
St Johnstone	0–3	3–0	0–0	4–0	2–0	3–2	1–1	1–1	2–0	1–1	1–5	

Legend: Blue = home team win; Yellow = draw; Red = away team win.

=== Matches 23–44 ===
During matches 23-44 each team plays every other team twice (home and away).

Home \ Away	ABE	AIR	CEL	DND	DNU	FAL	HOM	HIB	MOT	PAR	RAN	STJ
Aberdeen		7–0	1–1	0–0	0–0	2–2	3–2	2–0	1–0	1–0	1–0	1–1
Airdrieonians	1–1		0–1	2–2	1–3	0–1	0–0	3–1	1–2	2–2	0–1	1–1
Celtic	1–0	4–0		2–0	0–1	1–0	1–0	2–1	1–1	0–0	2–1	5–1
Dundee	1–2	1–1	0–1		0–4	2–1	1–0	3–1	1–1	0–1	1–3	1–0
Dundee United	3–0	1–4	2–3	1–0		2–1	0–1	0–3	0–0	3–1	0–0	1–2
Falkirk	1–4	0–1	0–3	1–0	1–2		6–0	3–3	1–3	4–2	1–2	2–2
Heart of Midlothian	1–2	1–1	1–0	0–0	1–0	3–1		1–0	0–0	1–1	2–3	2–0
Hibernian	1–2	3–1	3–1	1–3	2–1	1–1	0–0		1–0	0–1	3–4	2–2
Motherwell	0–2	0–0	2–0	1–2	2–0	2–1	2–1	0–0		2–3	0–4	1–1
Partick Thistle	1–3	1–1	0–1	2–0	0–4	0–1	1–1	0–3	0–1		3–0	1–1
Rangers	2–0	2–2	1–0	3–0	1–0	5–0	2–1	3–0	1–0	3–1		2–0
St Johnstone	0–2	1–0	1–1	1–1	1–4	1–0	3–1	2–0	0–0	0–0	1–1	

Legend: Blue = home team win; Yellow = draw; Red = away team win.

== Awards ==
- Player awards

Award	Winner	Club
PFA Players' Player of the Year	(Scotland) Andy Goram	Rangers
PFA Young Player of the Year	(Scotland) Eoin Jess	Aberdeen
SFWA Footballer of the Year	(Scotland) Andy Goram	Rangers

- Manager awards

Award	Winner	Club
SFWA Manager of the Year	(Scotland) Walter Smith	Rangers

== See also ==
- 1992–93 in Scottish football
- 1992–93 Rangers F.C. season
- Nine in a row
