= Stephen Watson (footballer) =

English footballer

Personal information
- Date of birth: 4 April 1973 (age 53)
- Place of birth: Liverpool, England
- Position: Midfielder

Senior career*
| Years | Team | Apps | (Gls) |
| 1992–1994 | Rangers | 3 | (0) |
| 1994–1998 | St Mirren | 104 (16) | (15) |
| 1999–2001 | Yee Hope | | |
| 2001 | Falkirk | 6 | (1) |
| 2001 | Partick Thistle | 1 | (0) |
| Total | | 114 | (16) |
- * Club domestic league appearances and goals

Stephen Watson (born 4 April 1973 in Liverpool) is an English former professional footballer who played for and captained Scottish side St Mirren in the early 1990s.

== Career ==
Watson began his career with Rangers, making three league appearances in the 1992–93 season. He moved on to St Mirren and spent four years with the Paisley club. Watson then spent a spell in Hong Kong with Yee Hope from 1999 to 2001 before returning to Scotland to play with Falkirk and Partick Thistle.
