= Pieter Huistra =

Dutch footballer (born 1967)

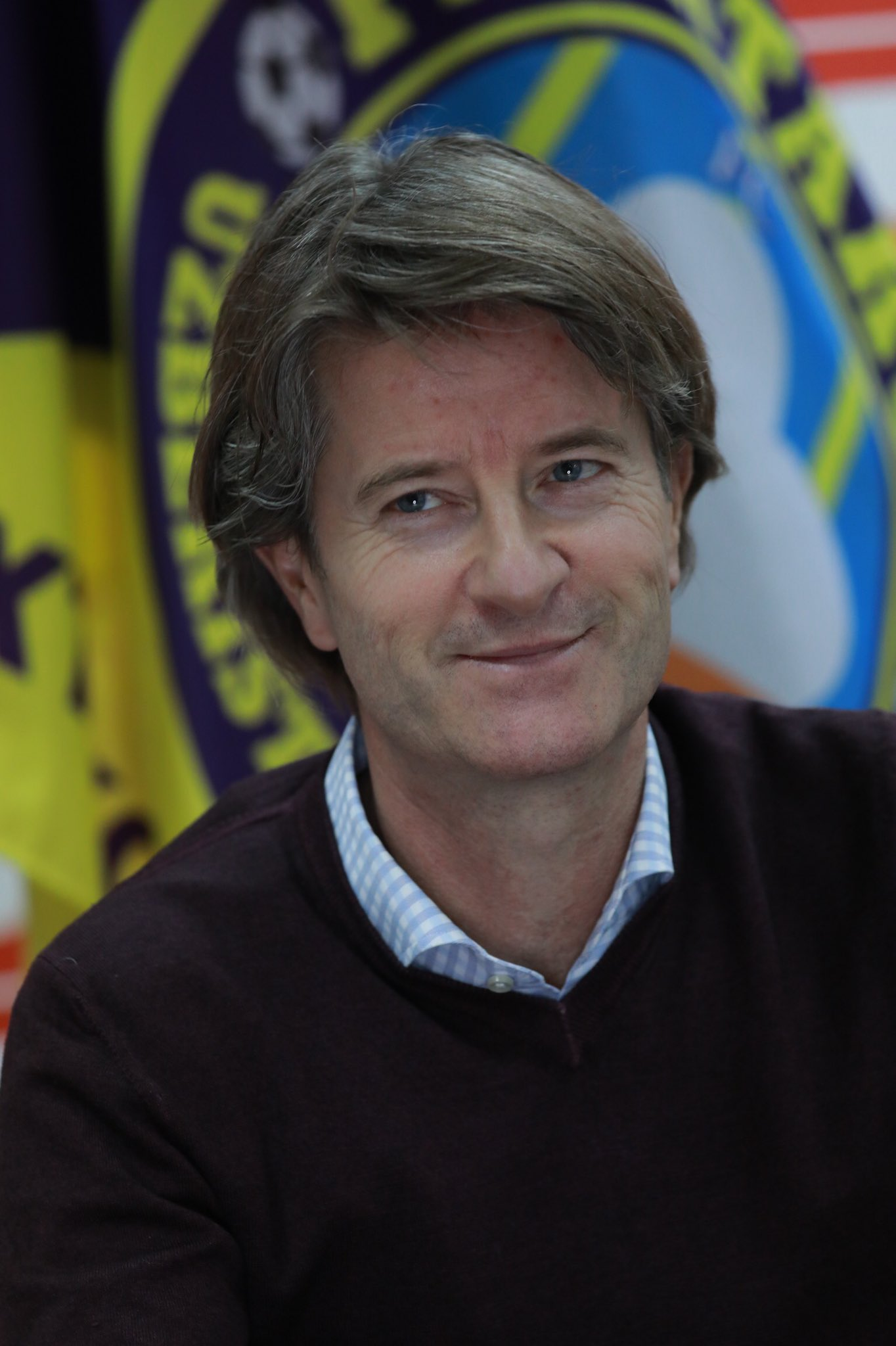
- Huistra as manager of Pakhtakor in 2021

Personal information
- Full name: Pieter Egge Huistra
- Date of birth: 18 January 1967 (age 59)
- Place of birth: Goënga, Netherlands
- Height: 1.82 m (6 ft 0 in)
- Position: Winger

Youth career
- SC Joure
- Drachtster Boys

Senior career*
Years	Team	Apps	(Gls)
1984–1986	Groningen	17	(1)
1986–1987	Veendam	33	(5)
1987–1990	Twente	93	(17)
1990–1994	Rangers	125	(22)
1995–1996	Sanfrecce Hiroshima	63	(13)
1996–1997	Groningen	9	(2)
1997–2000	Lierse	54	(11)
2000	RBC	0	(0)
Total		394	(71)

International career
1988–1991	Netherlands	8	(0)

Managerial career
- 2001–2005: Jong Groningen
- 2009–2010: Jong Ajax
- 2010–2012: Groningen
- 2012–2013: De Graafschap
- 2015: Indonesia (caretaker)
- 2016: Iwaki
- 2021–2022: Pakhtakor
- 2023–2025: Borneo Samarinda
- 2025: PSS Sleman
- 2026: PSS Sleman
- * Club domestic league appearances and goals

Pieter Egge Huistra (born 18 January 1967) is a Dutch professional football coach and former player.

A former winger, Huistra played for Scottish Premier Division club Rangers from 1990 to 1995, before leaving to play for Sanfrecce Hiroshima in the J. League.

In 2001, Huistra began coaching as the head coach of Jong Groningen. He was with them for four years before being named assistant coach to Aad de Mos at Vitesse. He became an assistant coach of Ajax and was named as their reserve team head coach on 24 April 2009. He then returned to Groningen, this time as head coach of the senior team, for the 2010–11 season. On 30 May 2012, he became the head coach of the Eerste Divisie club De Graafschap. On 3 December 2014, he was appointed as technical director of the Indonesia national team.

== Playing career ==
Huistra started his football career as an amateur with SC Joure and Drachtster Boys, where his qualities quickly stood out. He made his debut in professional football for FC Groningen at the age of 17 on 5 September 1984, when he replaced Anne Mulder after sixty minutes in a 3–1 defeat against FC Volendam.

After two seasons, he was loaned out to Veendam, who entered the Eredivisie. He was then brought to FC Twente by coach Kees Rijvers. The left winger became a permanent fixture in the team and reached the Netherlands national team. However, injury cost him his place in the squad for the 1990 World Cup. He played a total of eight international matches.

Between 1990 and 1995 Huistra played for Scottish Premier Division club Rangers, becoming the first of a number of Dutch players to play for the club, where he won five League medals, three League Cup medals and two Scottish Cup medals. His farewell match for Rangers came on 14 January 1995 against Falkirk at Brockville Park, he scored two goals in a 3–2 victory. He left Rangers to play for Sanfrecce Hiroshima in the J1 League.

After a spell back in Groningen, Huistra signed a three-year deal with Belgian top tier side Lierse in 1997, but a chronic achilles tendon injury cut his career short en after revalidating at RBC he decided to call it quits in October 2000.

== Career statistics ==
=== Club ===
Appearances and goals by club, season and competition
Club	Season	League			National cup (Note: Includes KNVB Cup, Scottish Cup, Emperor's Cup, Belgian Cup.)		League cup (Note: Includes Scottish League Cup.)		Europe		Total	
Club	Season	Division	Apps	Goals	Apps	Goals	Apps	Goals	Apps	Goals	Apps	Goals
Groningen	1984–85	Eredivisie	10	1	0	0	–		–		10	1
Groningen	1985–86	Eredivisie	7	0	2	0	–		–		9	0
Groningen	Total		17	1	2	0	0	0	0	0	19	1
Veendam	1986–87	Eredivisie	33	5	0	0	–		–		33	5
Twente	1987–88	Eredivisie	34	8	2	1	–		–		36	9
Twente	1988–89	Eredivisie	34	6	3	1	–		–		37	7
Twente	1989–90	Eredivisie	25	3	0	0	–		2	0	27	3
Twente	Total		93	17	5	2	0	0	2	0	100	19
Rangers	1990–91	Premier Division	27	4					2	0	29	4
Rangers	1991–92	Premier Division	32	5					1	0	33	5
Rangers	1992–93	Premier Division	30	4					6	2	36	6
Rangers	1993–94	Premier Division	21	6							21	6
Rangers	1994–95	Premier Division	15	3							15	3
Rangers	Total		125	22					9	2	125	22
Sanfrecce Hiroshima	1995	J1 League	35	6	5	2	–		–		40	8
Sanfrecce Hiroshima	1996	J1 League	28	7	0	0	14	5	–		42	12
Sanfrecce Hiroshima	Total		63	13	5	2	14	5	0	0	82	20
Groningen	1996–97	Eredivisie	9	2	0	0	–		–		9	2
Lierse	1997–98	First Division	32	11			–		7	1	39	12
Lierse	1998–99	First Division	22	0			–		–		22	0
Lierse	1999–2000	First Division	0	0			–		–		0	0
Lierse	Total		54	11			0	0	7	1	61	12
Career total			394	71	12	4	14	5	18	3	438	83

=== International ===
Appearances and goals by national team and year
National team	Year	Apps	Goals
Netherlands	1988	1	0
Netherlands	1989	4	0
Netherlands	1990	0	0
Netherlands	1991	3	0
Total		8	0

== Managerial career ==
Huistra began his coaching career in 2000 as assistant coach for the Dutch U-17 team. In 2001, he moved to Hong Kong to become assistant coach of Hong Kong national team for one year. After that, he went back to Groningen to work in the youth academy and lead their U-19 team and Jong Groningen. He was there for four years. On 1 July 2005, he left Groningen and was named as the new assistant coach at Vitesse Arnhem. He served under the guidance of Aad de Mos.

After he left Vitesse, he became an assistant coach at Ajax as replacement for the injured Rob Witschge and was named as the new Jong Ajax head coach on 24 April 2009. In January 2010, after FC Groningen head coach at the time, Ron Jans, announced his intention to leave the club at the end of the season, Huistra was announced as new main team head coach for the 2010–11 season.

He served as head coach for two full seasons. The first season was very successful. He implemented attacking-minded and fully exciting football. With a record number of points, the team reached the final of the play offs to qualify for Europa League in which they lost on penalties. In the second season, the club renewed his contract but many of the top players were sold. The new team was not capable to repeat the successful 2010–11 season. Due to illness and injuries the club missed out on the play offs and ended in 14th place. the seasonal outcome, below the boards aspirations, led to his dismissal on 10 May 2012.

On 30 May 2012, he was announced as new head coach of recently relegated 2012–13 Eerste Divisie club De Graafschap, with the goal to bring his new club back to the top flight. In his first season with a complete new team, he won a stage title and was named manager of the month. In the play offs for promotion the team lost in the second round against Roda JC. The directors rewarded his work with a contract renewal. In the second season, Huistra got into a conflict with a small part of the fans and was fired on 24 December 2013.

On 3 December 2014, he was appointed as the technical director of the Indonesian football association, PSSI.

On 7 May 2015, he was called to become the interim head coach of the Indonesia national team for 2018 World Cup qualifiers and 2019 Asian Cup qualifiers. However, a month later FIFA banned Indonesia from taking part because of political interference.

In January 2016, Huistra became head coach of Japanese club Iwaki FC. Under supervision of Dome corporation, he became the technical leader of the new start up club. The first season the club won several regional and national trophies.

On 31 March 2017, he was appointed as technical advisor of Slovak champion AS Trenčín until end of season. He left the club shortly after to join Pakhtakor Tashkent in Uzbekistan, initially as an assistant to Shota Arveladze. Together with Arveladze, they led the club from eight to third place and qualified for the AFC Champions League. The season after, Pakhtakor ended in second place and reached the Cup final. In December 2018, the Uzbek club renewed the contracts of all the technical staff for a year.

In 2019, the club had a good start when it qualified for the group stage of the Champions League after winning two qualifying rounds. Huistra left Pakhtakor on 10 January 2022.

== Managerial statistics ==
As of 16 November 2026

Managerial record by team and tenure
Team	Nat.	From	To	Record								Ref.
Team	Nat.	From	To	G	W	D	L	GF	GA	GD	Win %	Ref.
Groningen	(Netherlands)	1 July 2010	10 May 2012	77	31	14	32	128	134	−6	40.26	
De Graafschap	(Netherlands)	30 May 2012	24 December 2013	59	24	16	19	110	89	+21	40.68	
Iwaki	(Japan)	13 January 2016	31 December 2016	13	12	0	1	102	5	+97	92.31	
Pakhtakor	(Uzbekistan)	6 January 2021	10 January 2022	37	23	8	6	62	29	+33	62.16	
Borneo Samarinda	(Indonesia)	21 February 2023	11 January 2025	72	38	16	18	113	73	+40	52.78	
PSS Sleman	(Indonesia)	19 February 2025	30 June 2025	11	5	0	6	15	17	−2	45.45	
PSS Sleman	(Indonesia)	1 July 2026	16 November 2026	10	2	2	6	18	17	+1	20.00	
Career Total				279	135	56	88	548	364	+184	48.39	

== Honours ==
=== Player ===
Glasgow Rangers

- Scottish Premier Division/Scottish Premier League: 1990–91, 1991–92, 1992–93, 1993–94, 1994–95
- Scottish Cup: 1991–92, 1992–93
- Scottish League Cup: 1990–91 1992–93, 1993–94

Lierse SK

- Belgian Super Cup: 1997
- Belgian Cup: 1999

=== Manager ===
Pakhtakor

- Uzbekistan Super League: 2021
- Uzbekistan Super Cup: 2021

=== Individual ===
- Liga 1 Coach of the Month: September 2023, February 2024, August 2024
