= Paul McKnight =

Northern Irish footballer

Personal information
- Full name: Paul McKnight
- Date of birth: 8 February 1977 (age 49)
- Place of birth: Belfast, Northern Ireland
- Position: Striker

Team information
- Current team: Distillery

Senior career*
Years	Team	Apps	(Gls)
1996–2000	Rangers	1	(0)
2000–2002	St Mirren	21	(2)
2001	Cambridge United (loan)	0	(0)
2002–2003	Linfield	19	(2)
2003–2004	St Mirren	3	(0)
2004–2006	Glenavon	50	(5)
2006–2008	Larne		
2008	Newry City		
2008–	Distillery	0	(0)

International career
1998	Northern Ireland U21	3	(0)
- * Club domestic league appearances and goals as of 1 June 2008

Paul McKnight (born 8 February 1977 in Belfast) is a Northern Irish professional footballer who plays for Ards.

McKnight signed for Rangers in August 1993. He made his debut for the club in a league match against Partick Thistle on 13 May 1995.

McKnight signed for St Mirren in late March 2000, and made his debut against Airdrieonians. The next week he came off the bench to score a late winner against Falkirk. A fortnight later he did the same against Ayr United, his last minute stunner creating a pitch invasion at Somerset Park. He missed all but four Scottish Premier League games through injury, and the following season was injured for large chunks and was released in the summer of 2002.

He returned to Northern Ireland where he signed for Linfield. He played a fair bit of the season there, but still had injuries. In summer 2003, Saints boss John Coughlin brought him back to Paisley. He was again hindered with injuries and made three appearances before being released in late November 2003.

In August 2009 he signed for Championship 1 side Ards, playing a handful of games before slipping into junior football. He returned to Ards in August 2010 as the club's assistant manager, before signing again as a player in September 2010.
