= 1992–93 in Scottish football =

1992–1993 in Scottish football

Premier Division champions
- Rangers

Division One champions
- Raith Rovers

Division Two champions
- Clyde

Scottish Cup winners
- Rangers

League Cup winners
- Rangers

Challenge Cup winners
- Hamilton Academical

Junior Cup winners
- Glenafton Athletic

Teams in Europe
- Airdrieonians, Celtic, Heart of Midlothian, Hibernian, Rangers

Scotland national team
- 1994 World Cup qualification
- ← 1991–92 1993–94 →

The 1992–93 season was the 96th season of competitive football in Scotland.

== Notable events ==
- Rangers completing a domestic treble of the Premier Division title, Scottish Cup and League Cup.
- The return of Celtic striker Frank McAvennie to the club from Aston Villa in January, four years after he left them for a second spell at West Ham United.
- Celtic's £1.5million pre-season move for West Ham United winger Stuart Slater.
- The pre-season sale of Rangers striker Paul Rideout to Everton for £500,000.
- Trevor Steven returning to Rangers at the start of the season after a year in France with Marseille, costing them a Scottish record fee of £2.4million – though less than half the £5.5million they had received for him in August 1991.
- Striker Duncan Shearer, who had played in England since 1983, finally played professional football in his homeland at the age of 30 after joining Aberdeen from Blackburn Rovers for £500,000.
- Rangers progressing to the group stage of the European Cup, eliminating English league champions Leeds United in the second knockout stage.
- Aidrieonians going into the European Cup Winners' Cup, having entered as the previous season's losing Scottish Cup finalists to league champions Rangers, ended the season relegated from the Premier Division.
- Jim McLean's final season as manager of Dundee United, bringing to an end his 22-year reign.

== Scottish Premier Division ==
Pos	Team	Pld	W	D	L	GF	GA	GD	Pts	Qualification or relegation
1	Rangers (C)	44	33	7	4	97	35	+62	73	Qualification for the Champions League first round
2	Aberdeen	44	27	10	7	87	36	+51	64	Qualification for the Cup Winners' Cup first round
3	Celtic	44	24	12	8	68	41	+27	60	Qualification for the UEFA Cup first round
4	Dundee United	44	19	9	16	56	49	+7	47	Qualification for the UEFA Cup first round
5	Heart of Midlothian	44	15	14	15	46	51	−5	44	Qualification for the UEFA Cup first round
6	St Johnstone	44	10	20	14	52	66	−14	40	
7	Hibernian	44	12	13	19	54	64	−10	37	
8	Partick Thistle	44	12	12	20	50	71	−21	36	
9	Motherwell	44	11	13	20	46	62	−16	35	
10	Dundee	44	11	12	21	48	68	−20	34	
11	Falkirk (R)	44	11	7	26	60	86	−26	29	Relegation to the 1993–94 Scottish First Division
12	Airdrieonians (R)	44	6	17	21	35	70	−35	29	Relegation to the 1993–94 Scottish First Division

Source: RSSSF
Rules for classification: 1) points; 2) goal difference; 3) number of goals scored.
(C) Champions; (R) Relegated

Champions: Rangers
Relegated: Falkirk, Airdrieonians

== Scottish League Division One ==
Pos	Team	Pld	W	D	L	GF	GA	GD	Pts	Promotion or relegation
1	Raith Rovers (C, P)	44	25	15	4	85	41	+44	65	Promotion to the Premier Division
2	Kilmarnock (P)	44	21	12	11	67	40	+27	54	Promotion to the Premier Division
3	Dunfermline Athletic	44	22	8	14	64	47	+17	52	
4	St Mirren	44	21	9	14	62	52	+10	51	
5	Hamilton Academical	44	19	12	13	65	45	+20	50	
6	Morton	44	19	10	15	65	56	+9	48	
7	Ayr United	44	14	18	12	49	44	+5	46	
8	Clydebank	44	16	13	15	71	66	+5	45	
9	Dumbarton	44	15	7	22	56	71	−15	37	
10	Stirling Albion	44	11	13	20	44	61	−17	35	
11	Meadowbank Thistle (R)	44	11	10	23	51	80	−29	32	Relegation to the Second Division
12	Cowdenbeath (R)	44	3	7	34	32	109	−77	13	Relegation to the Second Division

Source: RSSSF and statto
Rules for classification: 1) points; 2) goal difference; 3) number of goals scored.
(C) Champions; (P) Promoted; (R) Relegated

Promoted: Raith Rovers, Kilmarnock
Relegated: Meadowbank Thistle, Cowdenbeath

== Scottish League Division Two ==
Pos	Team	Pld	W	D	L	GF	GA	GD	Pts	Promotion
1	Clyde (C, P)	39	22	10	7	77	42	+35	54	Promotion to the First Division
2	Brechin City (P)	39	23	7	9	62	32	+30	53	Promotion to the First Division
3	Stranraer	39	19	15	5	69	44	+25	53	
4	Forfar Athletic	39	18	10	11	74	54	+20	46	
5	Alloa Athletic	39	16	12	11	63	54	+9	44	
6	Arbroath	39	18	8	13	59	50	+9	44	
7	Stenhousemuir	39	15	10	14	59	48	+11	40	
8	Berwick Rangers	39	16	7	16	56	64	−8	39	
9	East Fife	39	14	10	15	70	64	+6	38	
10	Queen of the South	39	12	9	18	57	72	−15	33	
11	Queen's Park	39	8	12	19	51	73	−22	28	
12	Montrose	39	10	7	22	46	71	−25	27	
13	East Stirlingshire	39	8	9	22	50	85	−35	25	
14	Albion Rovers	39	6	10	23	36	76	−40	22	

Source: "1992-1993 Second Division - SPFL Archive". SPFL.
Rules for classification: 1) points; 2) goal difference; 3) number of goals scored.
(C) Champions; (P) Promoted

Promoted: Clyde, Brechin City

== Other honours ==
=== Cup honours ===
Competition	Winner	Score	Runner-up
Scottish Cup 1992–93	Rangers	2 – 1	Aberdeen
League Cup 1992–93	Rangers	2 – 1 (a.e.t.)	Aberdeen
Challenge Cup	Hamilton Academical	3 – 2	Greenock Morton
Youth Cup	Heart of Midlothian	3 – 1	Rangers
Junior Cup	Glenafton Athletic	1 – 0	Tayport

=== Individual honours ===
==== SPFA awards ====
Award	Winner	Club
Players' Player of the Year	(Scotland) Andy Goram	Rangers
Young Player of the Year	(Scotland) Eoin Jess	Aberdeen

==== SFWA awards ====
Award	Winner	Club
Footballer of the Year	(Scotland) Andy Goram	Rangers
Manager of the year	(Scotland) Walter Smith	Rangers

== Scottish clubs in Europe ==
Club	Competition(s)	Final round	Coef.
Rangers	UEFA Champions League	Group stage	18.00
Airdrieonians	UEFA Cup Winners' Cup	First round	0.00
Celtic	UEFA Europa League	Second round	2.00
Heart of Midlothian	UEFA Europa League	Second round	2.00
Hibernian	UEFA Europa League	First round	2.00

Average coefficient – 4.800

== Scotland national team ==
Date	Venue	Opponents	Score	Competition	Scotland scorer(s)
9 September 1992	Wankdorf Stadion, Bern (A)	Switzerland	1–3	WCQG1	Ally McCoist
14 October 1992	Ibrox Stadium, Glasgow (H)	Portugal	0–0	WCQG1	
18 November 1992	Ibrox Stadium, Glasgow (H)	Italy	0–0	WCQG1	
17 February 1993	Ibrox Stadium, Glasgow (H)	Malta	3–0	WCQG1	Ally McCoist (2), Pat Nevin
24 March 1993	Ibrox Stadium, Glasgow (H)	Germany	0–1	Friendly	
28 April 1993	Estadio da Luz, Lisbon (A)	Portugal	0–5	WCQG1	
19 May 1993	Kadrioru Stadium, Tallinn (A)	Estonia	3–0	WCQG1	Kevin Gallacher, John Collins, Scott Booth
2 June 1993	Pittodrie, Aberdeen (H)	Estonia	3–1	WCQG1	Pat Nevin (2), Brian McClair

Key:

- (H) = Home match
- (A) = Away match
- WCQG1 = World Cup qualifying – Group 1

== See also ==
- 1992–93 Dundee United F.C. season
- 1992–93 Rangers F.C. season
- 1992–93 Aberdeen F.C. season
