= John Morrow (footballer) =

Northern Irish footballer

Personal information
- Full name: John James Morrow
- Date of birth: 20 November 1971 (age 54)
- Place of birth: Belfast, Northern Ireland
- Position: Striker

Senior career*
| Years | Team | Apps | (Gls) |
| 1987–1988 | Linfield | | |
| 1988–1996 | Rangers | 5 | (0) |
| 1996–1997 | Oldham Athletic | 2 | (0) |
| 1997–1999 | Greenock Morton | 12 | (1) |
- * Club domestic league appearances and goals

John James Morrow (born 20 November 1971) is a Northern Irish former footballer who played as a forward. Born in Belfast, he played professionally for Linfield, Rangers, Oldham Athletic and Greenock Morton. He also had a trial at Manchester United in October 1987, shortly before his 16th birthday.
