= 1992–93 Scottish Cup =

Tournament details
- Country: Scotland

Final positions
- Champions: Rangers
- Runners-up: Aberdeen

Tournament statistics
- Top goal scorer: Ally McCoist (5)

The 1992–93 Scottish Cup was the 108th staging of Scotland's most prestigious football knockout competition. The Cup was won by Rangers who defeated Aberdeen in the final.

== First round ==
Home team	Score	Away team
Cove Rangers	2 – 0	Peterhead
Forfar Athletic	5 – 0	Albion Rovers
Huntly	4 – 2	Stranraer
Inverness Thistle	3 – 1	Civil Service Strollers
Queen of the South	3 – 0	Spartans
Queen's Park	0 – 1	Clyde

== Second round ==
Home team	Score	Away team
Huntly	2 – 1	Queen of the South
Stenhousemuir	2 – 3	Forfar Athletic
Inverness Thistle	0 – 1	Berwick Rangers
Clyde	3 – 1	Brechin City
Cove Rangers	2 – 0	Montrose
East Fife	1 – 1	Alloa Athletic
Gala Fairydean	1 – 1	Arbroath
Vale of Leithen	0 – 0	East Stirlingshire

=== Replays ===
Home team	Score	Away team
East Stirlingshire	3 – 2	Vale of Leithen
Alloa Athletic	1 – 1 (5 – 6 pen.)	East Fife
Arbroath	2 – 0	Gala Fairydean

== Third round ==
Home team	Score	Away team
Falkirk	5 – 2	Berwick Rangers
Dundee	2 – 0	Dumbarton
Aberdeen	4 – 1	Hamilton Academical
Airdrieonians	0 – 0	Clydebank
Arbroath	3 – 0	Greenock Morton
Clyde	0 – 0	Celtic
Cove Rangers	2 – 2	East Stirlingshire
Dundee United	3 – 1	Meadowbank Thistle
Dunfermline Athletic	1 – 2	Ayr United
Hearts	6 – 0	Huntly
Hibernian	5 – 2	St Mirren
Kilmarnock	5 – 0	Raith Rovers
Motherwell	0 – 2	Rangers
Partick Thistle	0 – 1	Cowdenbeath
St Johnstone	6 – 0	Forfar Athletic
Stirling Albion	1 – 2	East Fife

=== Replays ===
Home team	Score	Away team
East Stirlingshire	2 – 1	Cove Rangers
Celtic	1 – 0	Clyde
Clydebank	2 – 0	Airdrieonians

== Fourth round ==
Home team	Score	Away team
Aberdeen	2 – 0	Dundee United
East Stirlingshire	1 – 2	Clydebank
Arbroath	0 – 0	East Fife
Ayr United	0 – 2	Rangers
Cowdenbeath	0 – 0	Hibernian
Falkirk	2 – 0	Celtic
Hearts	2 – 0	Dundee
Kilmarnock	0 – 0	St Johnstone

=== Replays ===
Home team	Score	Away team
East Fife	1 – 4	Arbroath
Hibernian	1 – 0	Cowdenbeath
St Johnstone	1 – 0	Kilmarnock

== Quarter-finals ==
Home team	Score	Away team
Aberdeen	1 – 1	Clydebank
Arbroath	0 – 3	Rangers
Hearts	2 – 0	Falkirk
Hibernian	2 – 0	St Johnstone

=== Replay ===
Home team	Score	Away team
Clydebank	3 – 4	Aberdeen

== Semi-finals ==
3 April 1993

Rangers	2–1	Hearts
Dave McPherson; Ally McCoist		Allan Preston

Celtic Park, Glasgow
Attendance: 41,738
Referee: Douglas Hope

3 April 1993

Aberdeen	1–0	Hibernian
Scott Booth

Tynecastle Stadium, Edinburgh
Attendance: 21,413

== Final ==
29 May 1993

Rangers	2–1	Aberdeen
Murray 23'; Hateley 43'		Richardson 77'

Celtic Park, Glasgow
Attendance: 50,715
Referee: Jim McCluskey

== See also ==
- 1992–93 in Scottish football
- 1992–93 Scottish League Cup
