= PFA Scotland Players' Player of the Year =

Sports award in Scotland

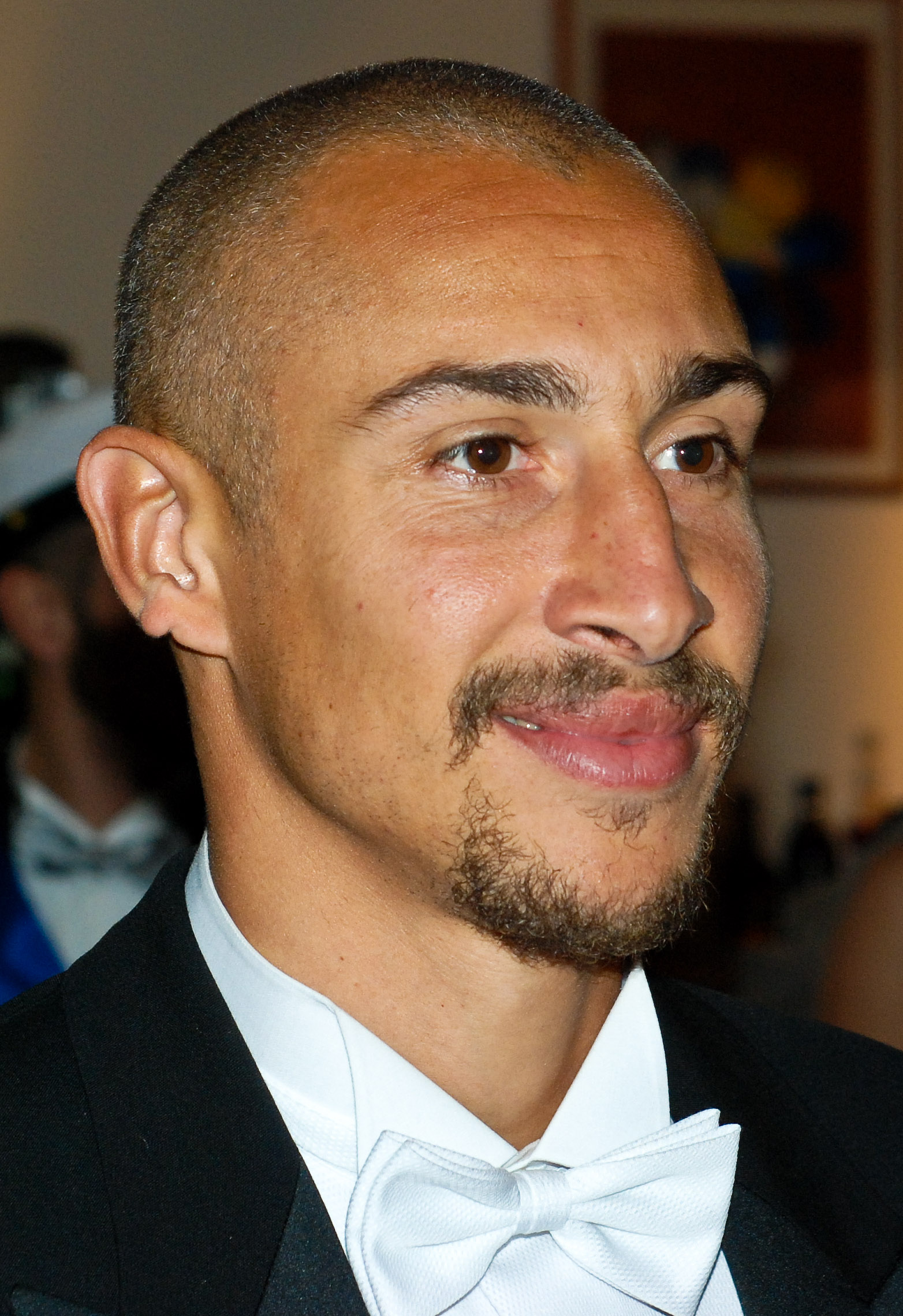
- Henrik Larsson won the award twice
- Awarded for: The outstanding player in each given Scottish football season
- Country: Scotland
- Presented by: PFA Scotland
- First award: 1978
- Player of the Year: Cláudio Braga

Highlights
- Most awards: Scott Brown; Henrik Larsson (2 wins each)

The PFA Scotland Players' Player of the Year (often called the Players' Player of the Year, or simply the Scottish Player of the Year) is an annual award given to the player who is adjudged to have been the best of the season in Scottish football. The award has been presented since the 1977–78 season and the winner is chosen by a vote amongst the members of the players' trade union, the Professional Footballers' Association Scotland (PFA Scotland). The award was formerly known as the Scottish Professional Footballers' Association Players' Player of the Year, but was renamed after the SPFA became affiliated with the (English) Professional Footballers' Association and rebranded PFA Scotland.

The first winner of the award was Rangers striker Derek Johnstone, and the first non-Scottish winner was Aberdeen goalkeeper Theo Snelders eleven years later. Although there is a separate PFA Scotland Young Player of the Year award, young players remain eligible to win the senior award, and in the 2005–06 season Shaun Maloney became the first player to win both awards in the same season, a feat repeated by Aiden McGeady two years later.

A shortlist of nominees is published in April and the winner of the award, along with the winners of PFA Scotland's other annual awards, is announced at a gala event in Glasgow a few days later. The award is regarded by the players themselves as extremely prestigious, with John Hartson commenting in 2005 that "the award means a lot because it's voted by your fellow professionals" and Shaun Maloney stating in 2006 that "there is no better accolade than to be voted for by your peers and it does mean a lot to me". In 2007 the SPFA was replaced by a new body, PFA Scotland, but the new organisation's awards are considered to be a direct continuation of the SPFA awards.

== Winners ==
The award has been presented on 48 occasions as of 2026, with two players sharing the award on one occasion (2004–05). There have been 46 different winners, with Scott Brown and Henrik Larsson being the only players to have won the award more than once. The table also indicates where the winning player also won one or more of the other major "player of the year" awards in Scottish football, namely the Scottish Football Writers' Association's Footballer of the Year award (SFWA), and the PFA Scotland Young Player of the Year award (SYPY).

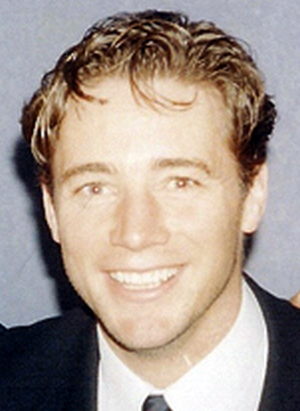
Ally McCoist was the 1992 winner.

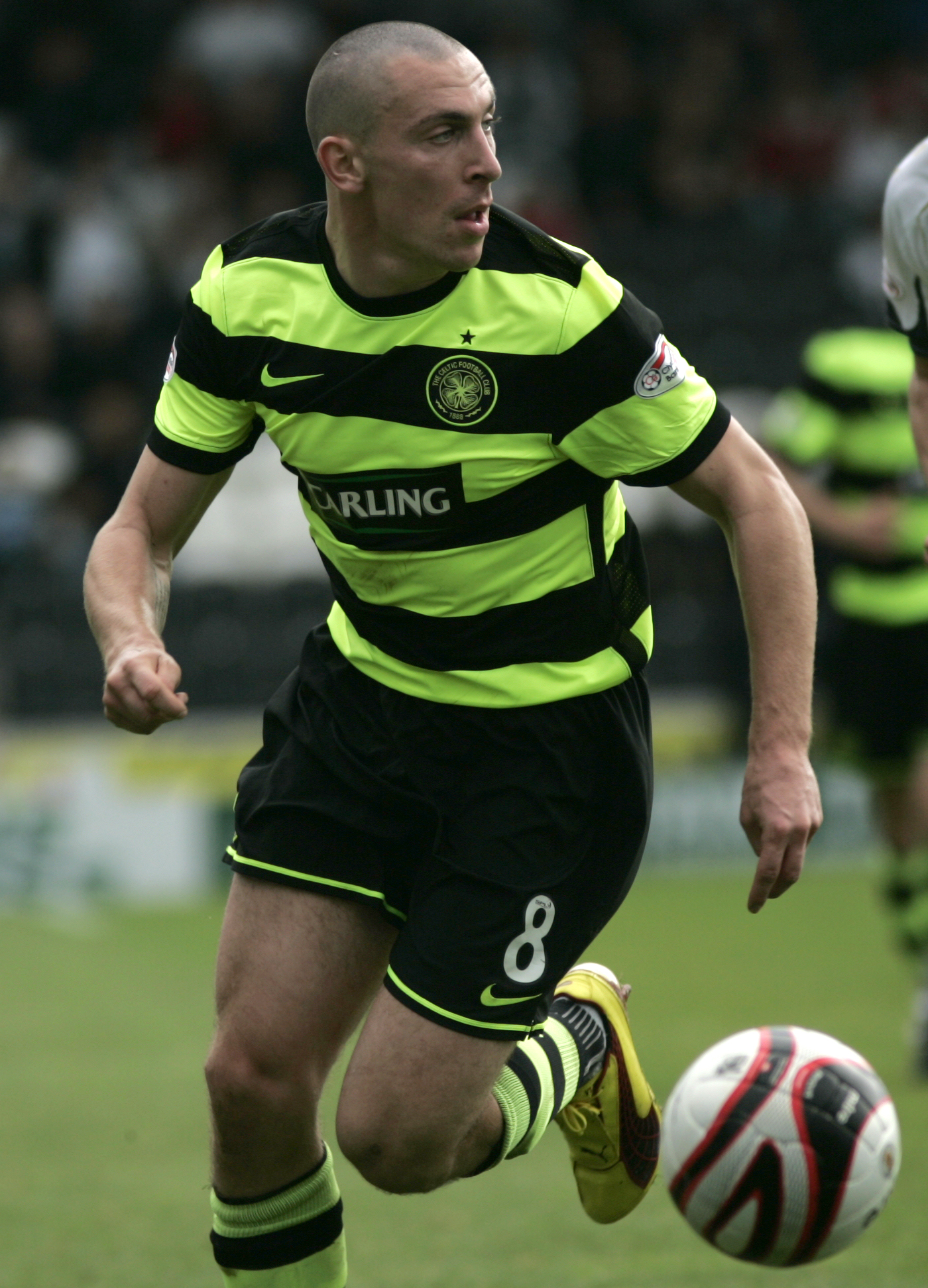
In 2018, Scott Brown became the second player to win the award twice.

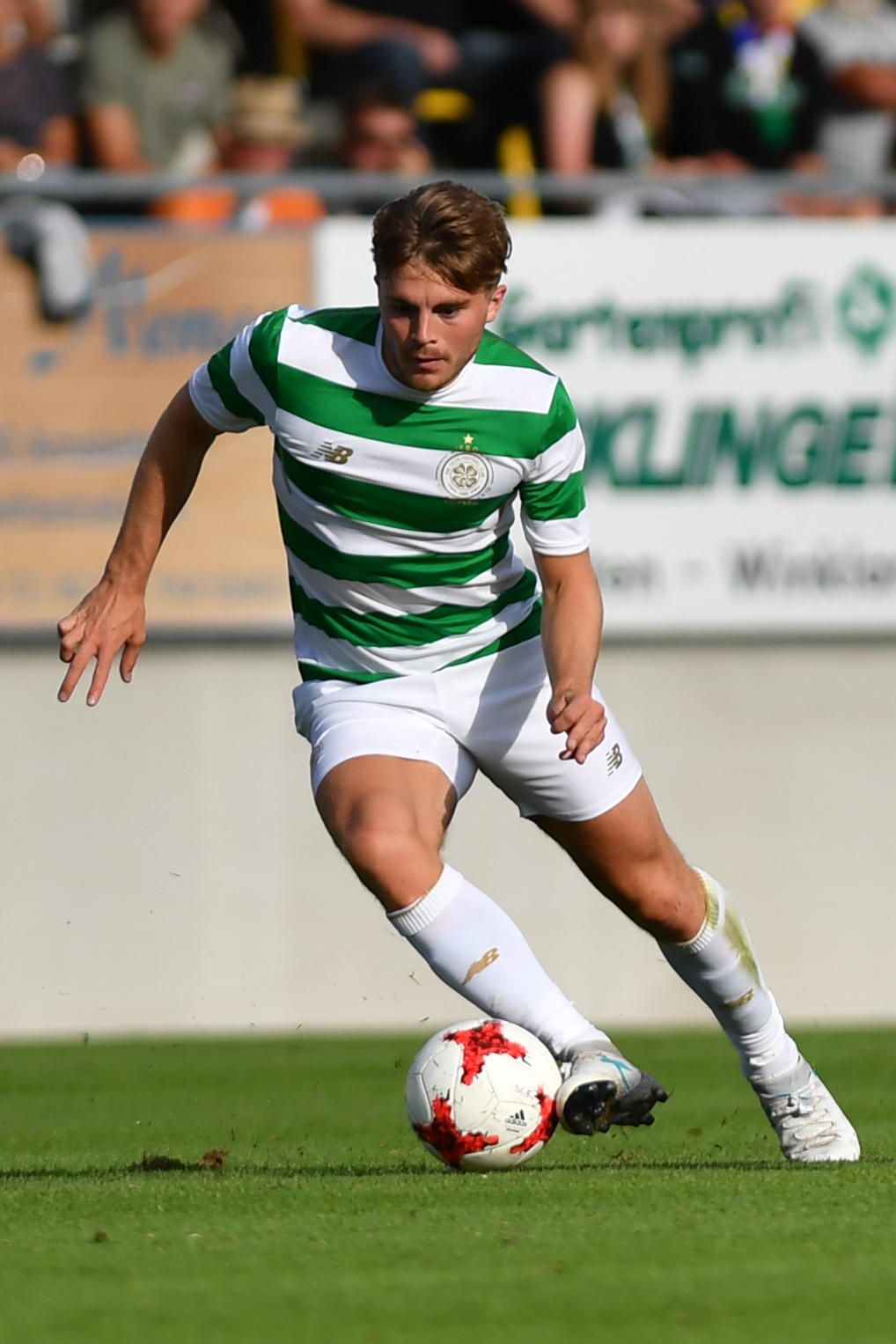
James Forrest won the award in 2019, the sixth consecutive Celtic player to be named Player of the Year.

| Season | Nat | Player | Club | Notes | Ref |
|---|---|---|---|---|---|
| 1977–78 | (Scotland) | Derek Johnstone | Rangers | Also won the SFWA award. First player to win SPFA and SFWA awards in the same season. | |
| 1978–79 | (Scotland) | Paul Hegarty | Dundee United | | |
| 1979–80 | (Scotland) | Davie Provan | Celtic | | |
| 1980–81 | (Scotland) | Mark McGhee | Aberdeen | | |
| 1981–82 | (Scotland) | Sandy Clark | Airdrieonians | | |
| 1982–83 | (Scotland) | Charlie Nicholas | Celtic | Also won the SFWA award. | |
| 1983–84 | (Scotland) | Willie Miller | Aberdeen | Also won the SFWA award | |
| 1984–85 | (Scotland) | Jim Duffy | Morton | | |
| 1985–86 | (Scotland) | Richard Gough | Dundee United | | |
| 1986–87 | (Scotland) | Brian McClair | Celtic | Also won the SFWA award | |
| 1987–88 | (Scotland) | Paul McStay | Celtic | Also won the SFWA award | |
| 1988–89 | (Netherlands) | Theo Snelders | Aberdeen | First winner of the award from outside Scotland and Britain | |
| 1989–90 | (Scotland) | Jim Bett | Aberdeen | | |
| 1990–91 | (England) | Paul Elliott | Celtic | | |
| 1991–92 | (Scotland) | Ally McCoist | Rangers | Also won the SFWA award | |
| 1992–93 | (Scotland) | Andy Goram | Rangers | Also won the SFWA award | |
| 1993–94 | (England) | Mark Hateley | Rangers | Also won the SFWA award | |
| 1994–95 | (Denmark) | Brian Laudrup | Rangers | Also won the SFWA award | |
| 1995–96 | (England) | Paul Gascoigne | Rangers | Also won the SFWA award | |
| 1996–97 | (Italy) | Paolo Di Canio | Celtic | | |
| 1997–98 | (Scotland) | Jackie McNamara | Celtic | | |
| 1998–99 | (Sweden) | Henrik Larsson | Celtic | Also won the SFWA award | |
| 1999–00 | (Australia) | Mark Viduka | Celtic | First winner of the award from outside Europe | |
| 2000–01 | (Sweden) | Henrik Larsson | Celtic | First two-time winner of the award. Also won the SFWA award. | |
| 2001–02 | (Italy) | Lorenzo Amoruso | Rangers | | |
| 2002–03 | (Scotland) | Barry Ferguson | Rangers | Also won the SFWA award | |
| 2003–04 | (England) | Chris Sutton | Celtic | | |
| 2004–05 | (Netherlands) | Fernando Ricksen (joint winner) | Rangers | | |
| 2004–05 | (Wales) | John Hartson (joint winner) | Celtic | Also won the SFWA award | |
| 2005–06 | (Scotland) | Shaun Maloney | Celtic | Also won the SYPY award. First player to win both PFA Scotland awards in the same season. | |
| 2006–07 | (Japan) | Shunsuke Nakamura | Celtic | Also won the SFWA award | |
| 2007–08 | (Republic of Ireland) | Aiden McGeady | Celtic | Also won the SYPY award | |
| 2008–09 | (Scotland) | Scott Brown | Celtic | | |
| 2009–10 | (Northern Ireland) | Steven Davis | Rangers | | |
| 2010–11 | (Honduras) | Emilio Izaguirre | Celtic | Also won the SFWA award | |
| 2011–12 | (Scotland) | Charlie Mulgrew | Celtic | Also won the SFWA award | |
| 2012–13 | (England) | Michael Higdon | Motherwell | | |
| 2013–14 | (Scotland) | Kris Commons | Celtic | Also won the SFWA award | |
| 2014–15 | (Norway) | Stefan Johansen | Celtic | | |
| 2015–16 | (Scotland) | Leigh Griffiths | Celtic | Also won the SFWA award | |
| 2016–17 | (England) | Scott Sinclair | Celtic | Also won the SFWA award | |
| 2017–18 | (Scotland) | Scott Brown | Celtic | Also won the SFWA award | |
| 2018–19 | (Scotland) | James Forrest | Celtic | Also won the SFWA award | |
| 2019–20 | —N/a | —N/a | —N/a | Due to the COVID-19 pandemic, PFA Scotland cancelled their awards for the 2019–20 season. | |
| 2020–21 | (England) | James Tavernier | Rangers | | |
| 2021–22 | (Scotland) | Callum McGregor | Celtic | | |
| 2022–23 | (Japan) | Kyōgo Furuhashi | Celtic | Also won the SFWA award | |
| 2023–24 | (Scotland) | Lawrence Shankland | Heart of Midlothian | Also won the SFWA award | |
| 2024–25 | (Japan) | Daizen Maeda | Celtic | Also won the SFWA award | |
| 2025–26 | (Portugal) | Cláudio Braga | Heart of Midlothian | Also won the SFWA award | |

== Breakdown of winners ==
=== Winners by country ===
| Country | Number of wins | Winning seasons |
|---|---|---|
| Scotland | 25 | 1977–78, 1978–79, 1979–80, 1980–81, 1981–82, 1982–83, 1983–84, 1984–85, 1985–86, 1986–87, 1987–88, 1989–90, 1991–92, 1992–93, 1997–98, 2002–03, 2005–06, 2008–09, 2011–12, 2013–14, 2015–16, 2017–18, 2018–19, 2021–22, 2023–24 |
| England | 7 | 1990–91, 1993–94, 1995–96, 2003–04, 2012–13, 2016–17, 2020–21 |
| Japan | 3 | 2006–07, 2022–23, 2024–25 |
| Italy | 2 | 1996–97, 2001–02 |
| Netherlands | 2 | 1988–89, 2004–05 (shared) |
| Sweden | 2 | 1998–99, 2000–01 |
| Australia | 1 | 1999–00 |
| Denmark | 1 | 1994–95 |
| Honduras | 1 | 2010–11 |
| Northern Ireland | 1 | 2009–10 |
| Norway | 1 | 2014–15 |
| Portugal | 1 | 2025–26 |
| Republic of Ireland | 1 | 2007–08 |
| Wales | 1 | 2004–05 (shared) |

=== Winners by club ===
| Club | Number of wins | Winning seasons |
|---|---|---|
| Celtic | 27 | 1979–80, 1982–83, 1986–87, 1987–88, 1990–91, 1996–97, 1997–98, 1998–99, 1999–00, 2000–01, 2003–04, 2004–05 (shared), 2005–06, 2006–07, 2007–08, 2008–09, 2010–11, 2011–12, 2013–14, 2014–15, 2015–16, 2016–17, 2017–18, 2018–19, 2021–22, 2022–23, 2024–25 |
| Rangers | 11 | 1977–78, 1991–92, 1992–93, 1993–94, 1994–95, 1995–96, 2001–02, 2002–03, 2004–05 (shared), 2009–10, 2020–21 |
| Aberdeen | 4 | 1980–81, 1983–84, 1988–89, 1989–90 |
| Dundee United | 2 | 1978–79, 1985–86 |
| Heart of Midlothian | 2 | 2023–24, 2025–26 |
| Airdrieonians | 1 | 1981–82 |
| Greenock Morton | 1 | 1984–85 |
| Motherwell | 1 | 2012–13 |

== See also ==
- PFA Scotland Team of the Year
- PFA Scotland Young Player of the Year
- SFWA Footballer of the Year
- PFA Players' Player of the Year
- FWA Footballer of the Year
- PFAI Players' Player of the Year
- Rex Kingsley Footballer of the Year
