= Lee Robertson =

Scottish footballer

Personal information
- Full name: Lee Jon Robertson
- Date of birth: 25 August 1973 (age 53)
- Place of birth: Edinburgh, Scotland
- Position: Midfielder

Senior career*
Years	Team	Apps	(Gls)
1990–1995	Rangers	3	(0)
1996	IK Start	16	(8)
1997	Molde FK	4	(0)
1997–1999	FK Bodø/Glimt	40	(1)
2000–2002	IK Start	27	(1)
2003	Greenock Morton	1	(0)
2004–2005	FK Jerv		

International career
1993–1994	Scotland U21	5	(0)

Managerial career
- 2005: FK Jerv (assistant)
- * Club domestic league appearances and goals

Lee Robertson (born 25 August 1973) is a Scottish former professional footballer.

Lee Robertson was born in Edinburgh, the son of Sheila and Robert Robertson.

Robertson began his career with Rangers making three league appearances for the club. He was released from his contract and moved to Norway with IK Start. He had spells with Molde FK and FK Bodø/Glimt and also a seven-day trial at St Johnstone in December 1999. Unfortunately heavy snow meant he left without even playing a bounce match for Saints.

Won the Scottish Premiership with Rangers 1994–1995, 1995–1996

Won the Scottish cup with Rangers 1995–1996

He returned to IK Start in 2000. In 2003, he went back to Scotland, but returned with his family to Norway shortly thereafter.

Ahead of the 2004 season, Robertson signed for FK Jerv, then in the Norwegian Third Division. In 2005 he served as playing assistant manager, before retiring.
