= 1991–92 Scottish Premier Division =

86th season of top-tier football league in Scotland

Scottish Premier Division
- Season: 1991–92
- Champions: Rangers; 7th Premier Division title 42nd Scottish title
- Relegated: St Mirren; Dunfermline Athletic
- Champions League: Rangers
- Cup Winners' Cup: Airdrieonians
- UEFA Cup: Heart of Midlothian; Celtic; Hibernian
- Matches: 264
- Goals: 677 (2.56 per match)
- Top goalscorer: Ally McCoist (34)

The 1991–92 Scottish Premier Division season was won by Rangers, nine points ahead of Hearts. St Mirren and Dunfermline Athletic were relegated to the 1992–93 First Division.

UEFA gave a third place for the UEFA Cup to Scotland after the disbandment of former East Germany.

== Clubs ==
=== Stadia and locations ===
Location of clubs in the 1991–92 Scottish Premier Division

Team	Location	Stadium
Aberdeen	Aberdeen	Pittodrie Stadium
Airdrieonians	Airdrie	Broomfield Park
Celtic	Parkhead, Glasgow	Celtic Park
Dundee United	Dundee	Tannadice Park
Dunfermline Athletic	Dunfermline	East End Park
Falkirk	Falkirk	Brockville Park
Heart of Midlothian	Gorgie, Edinburgh	Tynecastle Park
Hibernian	Leith, Edinburgh	Easter Road
Motherwell	Motherwell	Fir Park
Rangers	Ibrox, Glasgow	Ibrox Park
St Johnstone	Perth	McDiarmid Park
St Mirren	Paisley	Love Street

=== Managers ===
Team	Manager
Aberdeen	(Scotland) Willie Miller
Airdrieonians	(Scotland) Alex MacDonald
Celtic	(Republic of Ireland) Liam Brady
Dundee United	(Scotland) Jim McLean
Dunfermline Athletic	(Scotland) Jocky Scott
Falkirk	(Scotland) Jim Jefferies
Heart of Midlothian	(Scotland) Joe Jordan
Hibernian	(Scotland) Alex Miller
Motherwell	(Scotland) Tommy McLean
Rangers	(Scotland) Walter Smith
St Johnstone	(Scotland) Alex Totten
St Mirren	(Scotland) David Hay

==== Managerial changes ====
Team	Outgoing manager	Date of vacancy	Manner of departure	Incoming manager	Date of appointment
Airdrieonians	(Scotland) Jimmy Bone	Pre-season	Resigned	(Scotland) Alex MacDonald	May 1991
Celtic	(Scotland) Billy McNeill	Pre-season	Sacked	(Republic of Ireland) Liam Brady	19 June 1991
St Mirren	(Scotland) Tony Fitzpatrick	Pre-season	Sacked	(Scotland) David Hay	May 1991
Dunfermline Athletic	(Scotland) Iain Munro	17 September 1991	Sacked	(Scotland) Jocky Scott	20 September 1991
Aberdeen	(Scotland) Jocky Scott	20 September 1991	Signed by Dunfermline Athletic	(Scotland) Alex Smith (individually)	N/A
Aberdeen	(Scotland) Alex Smith	10 February 1992	Sacked	(Scotland) Willie Miller	10 February 1992

== League table ==
Pos	Team	Pld	W	D	L	GF	GA	GD	Pts	Qualification or relegation
1	Rangers (C)	44	33	6	5	101	31	+70	72	Qualification for the Champions League first round
2	Heart of Midlothian	44	27	9	8	60	37	+23	63	Qualification for the UEFA Cup first round
3	Celtic	44	26	10	8	88	42	+46	62	Qualification for the UEFA Cup first round
4	Dundee United	44	19	13	12	66	50	+16	51	
5	Hibernian	44	16	17	11	53	45	+8	49	Qualification for the UEFA Cup first round
6	Aberdeen	44	17	14	13	55	42	+13	48	
7	Airdrieonians	44	13	10	21	50	70	−20	36	Qualification for the Cup Winners' Cup first round
8	St Johnstone	44	13	10	21	52	73	−21	36	
9	Falkirk	44	12	11	21	54	73	−19	35	
10	Motherwell	44	10	14	20	43	61	−18	34	
11	St Mirren (R)	44	6	12	26	33	73	−40	24	Relegation to the 1992–93 Scottish First Division
12	Dunfermline Athletic (R)	44	4	10	30	22	80	−58	18	Relegation to the 1992–93 Scottish First Division

Rules for classification: 1) points; 2) goal difference; 3) number of goals scored.
(C) Champions; (R) Relegated
- Hibernian qualified to Uefa Cup as winner of League Cup.

== Results ==
=== Matches 1–22 ===
During matches 1-22 each team plays every other team twice (home and away).

Home \ Away	ABE	AIR	CEL	DNU	DNF	FAL	HOM	HIB	MOT	RAN	STJ	STM
Aberdeen		3–1	1–0	0–1	3–0	1–1	0–2	1–1	3–1	2–3	1–2	4–1
Airdrieonians	1–2		0–3	1–3	3–1	0–0	2–3	0–1	0–1	0–4	1–2	4–1
Celtic	2–1	3–1		4–1	1–0	4–1	3–1	0–0	2–2	0–2	4–0	0–0
Dundee United	0–0	0–0	3–4		3–0	2–1	0–1	1–1	2–2	3–2	1–2	4–1
Dunfermline Athletic	0–0	1–2	1–3	1–2		0–4	1–2	1–2	0–0	0–5	0–0	1–4
Falkirk	0–1	3–2	4–3	0–4	0–1		1–2	3–2	1–1	0–2	2–3	3–0
Heart of Midlothian	1–0	1–0	3–1	1–1	1–0	1–0		0–0	2–0	1–0	2–1	0–0
Hibernian	1–0	2–2	1–1	1–0	3–0	2–2	1–1		0–0	0–3	2–1	4–1
Motherwell	0–1	1–2	0–2	1–1	3–0	4–2	0–1	1–1		0–2	1–1	1–0
Rangers	0–2	4–0	1–1	1–1	4–0	1–1	2–0	4–2	2–0		6–0	0–1
St Johnstone	1–3	1–0	1–0	1–1	3–2	2–3	0–1	0–1	0–1	2–3		1–0
St Mirren	0–1	1–2	0–5	1–1	0–0	0–0	2–3	0–1	1–2	1–2	1–1	

Legend: Blue = home team win; Yellow = draw; Red = away team win.

=== Matches 23–44 ===
During matches 23-44 each team plays every other team twice (home and away).

Home \ Away	ABE	AIR	CEL	DNU	DNF	FAL	HOM	HIB	MOT	RAN	STJ	STM
Aberdeen		1–0	2–2	0–2	1–1	1–1	2–0	0–1	2–0	0–2	4–1	0–0
Airdrieonians	2–0		0–0	1–0	3–2	2–2	2–1	0–3	2–0	0–0	0–3	1–1
Celtic	1–0	2–0		3–1	2–0	2–0	1–2	1–2	4–1	1–3	3–2	4–0
Dundee United	4–0	2–1	1–1		0–0	2–1	2–0	1–0	2–2	1–2	2–1	1–3
Dunfermline Athletic	0–0	0–0	0–1	0–1		1–0	0–2	0–0	3–1	1–3	0–3	0–0
Falkirk	2–2	0–3	0–3	1–3	2–0		1–2	2–3	0–1	1–3	2–0	1–0
Heart of Midlothian	0–4	2–2	1–2	1–0	1–0	2–0		1–1	3–1	0–1	2–0	0–0
Hibernian	1–1	0–2	0–2	3–2	5–0	0–1	1–2		0–0	1–3	0–1	0–0
Motherwell	3–3	0–3	0–0	1–2	1–2	0–1	0–1	1–1		1–2	3–1	3–0
Rangers	0–0	5–0	0–2	2–0	2–1	4–1	1–1	2–0	2–0		3–1	4–0
St Johnstone	0–0	1–1	2–4	1–1	1–0	1–1	0–5	1–1	0–0	1–2		1–2
St Mirren	0–2	4–1	1–1	0–1	3–1	0–1	0–1	0–1	1–2	1–2	1–5	

Legend: Blue = home team win; Yellow = draw; Red = away team win.

== Awards ==
- Player awards

Award	Winner	Club
PFA Players' Player of the Year	(Scotland) Ally McCoist	Rangers
PFA Young Player of the Year	(Scotland) Phil O'Donnell	Motherwell
SFWA Footballer of the Year	(Scotland) Ally McCoist	Rangers

- Manager awards

Award	Winner	Club
SFWA Manager of the Year	(Scotland) Walter Smith	Rangers

== See also ==
- Nine in a row
