= Neil Murray (footballer) =

Scottish footballer

Personal information
- Full name: Neil Andrew Murray
- Date of birth: 21 February 1973 (age 53)
- Place of birth: Bellshill, Scotland
- Position: Midfielder

Senior career*
Years	Team	Apps	(Gls)
1989–1996	Rangers	63	(3)
1996–1997	Sion	35	(0)
1997–1998	Lorient	16	(2)
1999	Dundee United	8	(0)
1999–2001	Mainz 05	11	(0)
2000–2001	→ Grimsby Town (loan)	2	(0)
2002	Falkirk	8	(0)
2002–2003	Ayr United	23	(0)

International career
1992–1996	Scotland U21	16	(0)
Medal record
Men's football
Representing Scotland
FIFA U-16 World Championship
Runner-up	1989 Scotland
- * Club domestic league appearances and goals

Neil Andrew Murray (born 21 February 1973 in Bellshill) is a Scottish former footballer. He began his career with Rangers in the early 1990s, and also played for clubs in Switzerland, France, Germany and England. He represented the Scotland Under-21 national team.

== Early life ==
Murray was educated at Marr College in Troon, South Ayrshire.

== Career ==
=== Playing ===
Murray began his career with Rangers, where he won the domestic treble in 1992/93. He left Rangers in 1996, joining Swiss club Sion and winning the Swiss League and Cup double before moving to Lorient in France a year later. He then returned to Scotland for a short spell at Dundee United, before signing for German club Mainz 05. During his two years there, he had a short loan spell in England with Grimsby Town. Murray came back Scotland permanently in 2002, signing for Falkirk before playing his final season in professional football with Ayr United.

Murray represented the Scotland national under-21 football team.

=== Scout and agent ===
Murray later worked alongside ex-Rangers player Kevin Drinkell for a sports management company. He also worked as a co-commentator for Setanta Sports coverage of the Bundesliga. Murray was appointed Head Scout by Rangers on 8 March 2011. He left this position 2 April 2013.

== Honours ==
=== Club ===
Rangers

- Scottish Premier Division: 1992–93, 1993–94, 1994–95, 1995–96
- Scottish Cup: 1992–93
- Scottish League Cup: 1992–93

Sion

- National League A: 1996–97
- Swiss Cup: 1996–97

=== International ===
- FIFA U-16 World Championship Runner-up: 1989
- World Student Games - Great Britain team - Bronze medal
- UEFA U21 European Championships semi-final 1996 in Barcelona
