= 1993–94 Dundee United F.C. season =

Dundee United
1993–94 season
- Chairman: Jim McLean
- Manager: Ivan Golac
- Stadium: Tannadice Park
- Premier Division: Sixth place
- Scottish Cup: Winners
- League Cup: Semi-finals
- Top goalscorer: League: Craig Brewster (16); All: Craig Brewster (20)
- Highest home attendance: 13,881 vs. Aberdeen, Premier Division, 7 August 1993
- Lowest home attendance: 5,335 vs. Raith Rovers, Premier Division, 14 May 1994
Home colours	Away colours

The 1993–94 season was the 85th year of football played by Dundee United, and covers the period from 1 July 1993 to 30 June 1994. United finished in sixth place but the season will be remembered for the club's first Scottish Cup win, after Ivan Golac guided the club to success in his first season.

== Summary ==
The club began the season without Duncan Ferguson, selling him to Rangers for a British transfer record of £4m. Replacing him up front was Craig Brewster, signed from Raith Rovers for a more modest £0.25m.

The club endured replays in most rounds of the Scottish Cup before beating Rangers to win the trophy at the seventh attempt.

Dundee United played a total of 58 competitive matches during the 1993–94 season. The team finished sixth in the Scottish Premier Division.

In the cup competitions, United won the Scottish Cup for the first time, beating Rangers 1–0 and qualifying for the following season's UEFA Cup Winners' Cup competition in the process. The club lost narrowly in the League Cup semi-final to Hibernian and lost on away goals to Brøndby in the UEFA Cup first round.

The club signed four players during the season, as well as loaning one for the latter part. Seven players were released by the club during the season.

The club's playing kits were not sponsored, although Rover Group started next season's deal early in time for the Cup Final.

== Results and fictures ==
All results are written with Dundee United's score first.

=== Scottish Premier Division ===
Date	Opponent	Venue	Result	Attendance	Scorers
7 August 1993	Aberdeen	H	1–1	13,881	McKinlay
14 August 1993	Partick Thistle	A	2–1	5,018	Dailly (2)
21 August 1993	St Johnstone	A	1–1	6,247	McKinlay
28 August 1993	Heart of Midlothian	H	0–0	8,502	
4 September 1993	Raith Rovers	A	1–1	4,871	McKinlay
11 September 1993	Dundee	H	1–0	10,664	McLaren
18 September 1993	Celtic	A	1–1	26,733	McKinlay
25 September 1993	Motherwell	H	0–0	6,633	
2 October 1993	Hibernian	A	0–2	7,586	
5 October 1993	Kilmarnock	A	1–1	7,034	McKinlay
9 October 1993	Rangers	H	1–3	11,045	Welsh
16 October 1993	Partick Thistle	H	2–2	5,760	Brewster, Crabbe
23 October 1993	Aberdeen	A	0–2	13,556	
30 October 1993	St Johnstone	H	2–0	6,275	Brewster, McKinlay
6 November 1993	Heart of Midlothian	A	1–1	8,362	O'Neil
9 November 1993	Raith Rovers	H	2–2	5,775	Bowman, McLaren
13 November 1993	Hibernian	H	2–2	6,880	McKinlay, Brewster
20 November 1993	Motherwell	A	0–2	5,807	
30 November 1993	Celtic	H	1–0	10,108	Connolly
4 December 1993	Kilmarnock	H	0–0	7,100	
7 December 1993	Dundee	A	2–1	9,156	Brewster, Connolly
11 December 1993	Rangers	A	3–0	43,058	Bowman, Connolly, Brewster
18 December 1993	Partick Thistle	A	0–1	4,365	
27 December 1993	Aberdeen	H	0–1	12,067	
8 January 1994	Heart of Midlothian	H	3–0	8,583	Connolly, Brewster, Crabbe
15 January 1994	Raith Rovers	A	2–0	5,150	Brewster (2)
22 January 1994	Celtic	A	0–0	17,235	
25 January 1994	St Johnstone	A	1–1	5,758	Brewster
5 February 1994	Dundee	H	1–1	10,622	Connolly
12 February 1994	Motherwell	H	1–2	6,573	Brewster
26 February 1994	Hibernian	A	1–0	7,021	Nixon
5 March 1994	Kilmarnock	A	1–1	7,403	Black
19 March 1994	Partick Thistle	H	2–2	6,005	Cleland, Brewster
26 March 1994	Aberdeen	A	0–1	12,574	
29 March 1994	Dundee	A	1–1	12,574	Brewster
2 April 1994	Celtic	H	1–3	9,790	Brewster
5 April 1994	Rangers	H	0–0	11,352	
16 April 1994	Hibernian	H	3–0	6,603	Petric, McKinlay, Brewster
23 April 1994	Rangers	A	1–2	44,776	Dailly
26 April 1994	Kilmarnock	H	1–3	8,801	Dailly
30 April 1994	St Johnstone	H	0–0	10,653	
3 May 1994	Motherwell	A	2–1	4,457	Dijkstra, Brewster
7 May 1994	Heart of Midlothian	A	0–2	13,627	
14 May 1994	Raith Rovers	H	2–3	5,335	Hannah, Brewster

=== Scottish Cup ===
Date	Round	Opponent	Venue	Result	Attendance	Scorers
29 January 1994	Third round	Arbroath	A	3–2	5,961	Brewster, Crabbe, McKinlay
19 February 1994	Fourth round	Motherwell	H	2–2	12,023	Brewster (2)
1 March 1994	Fourth round replay	Motherwell	A	1–0	13,002	Welsh
12 March 1994	Quarter–finals	Airdrieonians	A	0–0	8,440	
15 March 1994	Quarter–finals replay	Airdrieonians	H	2–0	9,355	McKinlay, McLaren
9 April 1994	Semi–finals	Aberdeen	N	1–1	21,937	Welsh
12 April 1994	Semi–finals replay	Aberdeen	N	1–0	13,936	McInally
21 May 1994	Final	Rangers	N	1–0	38,000	Brewster

=== Scottish League Cup ===
Date	Round	Opponent	Venue	Result	Attendance	Scorers
10 August 1993	Second round	Hamilton Academical	A	1–0	2,743	Connolly
24 August 1993	Third round	St Mirren	A	1–0	4,415	McKinlay
31 August 1993	Quarter–finals	Falkirk	H	3–3	8,750	Clark (2), McLaren
21 September 1993	Semi–finals	Hibernian	N	0–1	19,024	

=== UEFA Cup ===
Date	Round	Opponent	Venue	Result	Attendance	Scorers
15 September 1993	First round 1st leg	(Denmark) Brøndby	A	0–2	5,756	
28 September 1993	First round 2nd leg	(Denmark) Brøndby	H	3–1	8,541	McKinlay, Clark, Crabbe

== Player statistics ==
During the 1993–94 season, United used 25 different players comprising five nationalities, with a further six named as unused substitutes. The table below shows the number of appearances and goals scored by each player.

No.	Pos	Nat	Player	Total		Premier Division		Scottish Cup		League Cup		UEFA Cup	
No.	Pos	Nat	Player	Apps	Goals	Apps	Goals	Apps	Goals	Apps	Goals	Apps	Goals
	GK	(Denmark) DEN	Brian Flies	1	0	1	0	0	0	0	0	0	0
	GK	(Scotland) SCO	Alan Main	23	0	17	0	0	0	4	0	2	0
	GK	(Netherlands) NED	Guido van de Kamp	33	0	25	0	8	0	0	0	0	0
	DF	(Scotland) SCO	Gary Bollan	17	0	11	0	1	0	4	0	1	0
	DF	(Scotland) SCO	John Clark	19	3	14	0	0	0	3	2	2	1
	DF	(Scotland) SCO	Alex Cleland	42	1	32	1	7	0	2	0	1	0
	DF	(Netherlands) NED	Fred van der Hoorn	36	0	28	0	2	0	4	0	2	0
	DF	(Scotland) SCO	Maurice Malpas	45	0	35	0	8	0	1	0	1	0
	DF	(Scotland) SCO	Dave Narey	12	0	6	0	2	0	3	0	1	0
	DF	(Scotland) SCO	Mark Perry	11	0	9	0	0	0	1	0	1	0
	DF	(Federal Republic of Yugoslavia) YUG	Gordan Petrić	35	1	27	1	8	0	0	0	0	0
	DF	(Scotland) SCO	Brian Welsh	50	3	37	1	7	2	4	0	2	0
	MF	(Scotland) SCO	Dave Bowman	47	2	35	2	6	0	4	0	2	0
	MF	(Scotland) SCO	David Hannah	14	1	10	1	4	0	0	0	0	0
	MF	(Scotland) SCO	Grant Johnson	11	0	9	0	0	0	1	0	1	0
	MF	(Scotland) SCO	Roy McBain	1	0	1	0	0	0	0	0	0	0
	MF	(Scotland) SCO	Jim McInally	41	1	31	0	8	1	2	0	0	0
	MF	(Scotland) SCO	Billy McKinlay	52	12	39	8	7	2	4	1	2	1
	MF	(Scotland) SCO	Andy McLaren	36	4	27	2	4	1	4	1	1	0
	MF	(England) ENG	Chris Myers	8	0	5	0	0	0	3	0	0	0
	MF	(Scotland) SCO	John O'Neil	16	1	12	1	2	0	1	0	1	0
	FW	(Scotland) SCO	Craig Brewster	40	20	33	16	7	4	0	0	0	0
	FW	(Scotland) SCO	Paddy Connolly	34	6	28	5	2	0	2	1	2	0
	FW	(Scotland) SCO	Scott Crabbe	28	4	22	2	3	1	1	0	2	1
	FW	(Scotland) SCO	Christian Dailly	50	3	38	3	6	0	4	0	2	0

=== Goalscorers ===
United had 14 players score with the team scoring 66 goals in total. The top goalscorer was Craig Brewster, who finished the season with 20 goals.

Name	League	Cups	Total
Craig Brewster	16	4	20
Billy McKinlay	8	4	12
Paddy Connolly	5	1	6
Scott Crabbe	2	2	4
Andy McLaren	2	2	4
Christian Dailly	3	0	3
Brian Welsh	1	2	3
John Clark	0	3	3
Dave Bowman	2	0	2
Own goals	2	0	2
Alex Cleland	1	0	1
David Hannah	1	0	1
John O'Neil	1	0	1
Gordan Petric	1	0	1
Jim McInally	0	1	1

=== Discipline ===
During the 1993–94 season, two United players were sent off. Statistics for cautions are unavailable.

Name	Dismissals
Craig Brewster	(red card) 1
Jim McInally	(red card) 1

== Competitions ==
=== League table ===
Pos	Team	Pld	W	D	L	GF	GA	GD	Pts	Qualification or relegation
4	Celtic	44	15	20	9	51	38	+13	50	
5	Hibernian	44	16	15	13	53	48	+5	47	
6	Dundee United	44	11	20	13	47	48	−1	42	Qualification for the Cup Winners' Cup first round
7	Heart of Midlothian	44	11	20	13	37	43	−6	42	
8	Kilmarnock	44	12	16	16	36	45	−9	40	

Source: RSSSF
Rules for classification: 1) points; 2) goal difference; 3) number of goals scored.

== Transfers ==
=== In ===
Date	Player	From	Fee
5 August	(Scotland) Craig Brewster	(Scotland) Raith Rovers	£250,000
5 August	(England) Chris Myers	(England) Torquay United	£100,000
21 December	(Trinidad and Tobago) Jerren Nixon	(Trinidad and Tobago) ECM Motown	£200,000
19 November	(Federal Republic of Yugoslavia) Gordan Petrić	(Federal Republic of Yugoslavia) FK Partizan	£600,000

=== Out ===
Date	Player	To	Fee
10 July	(Federal Republic of Yugoslavia) Miodrag Krivokapić	(Scotland) Motherwell	Unknown
20 July	(Scotland) Duncan Ferguson	(Scotland) Rangers	£4,000,000
20 August	(Northern Ireland) Michael O'Neill	(Scotland) Hibernian	£245,000
10 February	(Scotland) John Clark	(England) Stoke City	£150,000

=== Loans in ===
Date	Player	From	Duration
1994	(Denmark) Brian Flies	(Denmark) Copenhagen	Short-term

=== Loans out ===
Date	Player	From	Duration
8 December	(England) Chris Myers	(England) Torquay United	Short-term

== See also ==
- 1993–94 in Scottish football
