= 1993–94 Rangers F.C. season =

Rangers
1993–94 season
- Chairman: David Murray
- Manager: Walter Smith
- Ground: Ibrox Stadium
- Scottish Premier Division: 1st
- Scottish Cup: Runners-up
- League Cup: Winners
- Champions League: First round
- Top goalscorer: League: Mark Hateley (22); All: Mark Hateley (30)
Home colours	Away colours

The 1993–94 season was the 114th season of competitive football by Rangers.

== Overview ==
Rangers played a total of 57 competitive matches during the 1993–94 season. The team finished first in the Scottish Premier Division and collected the sixth of their nine league titles, despite only winning 22 of their 44 league games.

During Rangers' league encounter against Raith Rovers at Ibrox on 16 April 1994, Duncan Ferguson headbutted the visitors' John McStay in the south-west corner of the Ibrox pitch. Referee Kenny Clark booked Ferguson, but he was subsequently charged with assault and, as it was his fourth such conviction, he served three months in prison.

In the cup competitions, they were defeated in the Scottish Cup final by Dundee United thanks to a Craig Brewster goal. The team did win the League Cup, beating Hibernian 2–1 with goals from Ian Durrant and Ally McCoist.

In their European campaign, Rangers crashed out of the UEFA Champions League in the first round after losing to Bulgarian outfit Levski Sofia on the away goals rule.

== Transfers ==
=== In ===
Date	Player	From	Fee
14 July 1993	(Scotland) Duncan Ferguson	(Scotland) Dundee United	£4,000,000
27 July 1993	(Scotland) Fraser Wishart	(Scotland) Falkirk	Free
16 September 1993	(Australia) Craig Moore	(Australia) Australian Institute of Sport	Free
23 November 1993	(Scotland) Gordon Durie	(England) Tottenham Hotspur	£1,200,000

=== Out ===
Date	Player	To	Fee
26 June 1993	(Scotland) Gary McSwegan	(England) Notts County	£400,000
9 July 1993	(England) Dale Gordon	(England) West Ham United	£750,000
4 January 1994	(Scotland) Sandy Robertson	(England) Coventry City	£400,000

- Expendure: ▼£4,950,000
- Income: ▲£1,550,000
- Total loss/gain: ▼£3,400,000

== Results ==
All results are written with Rangers' score first.

=== Scottish Premier Division ===
Date	Opponent	Venue	Result	Attendance	Scorers
7 August 1993	Heart of Midlothian	H	2–1	43,261	Hagen, Hateley
14 August 1993	St Johnstone	A	2–1	10,152	Gough, I. Ferguson
21 August 1993	Celtic	A	0–0	47,942	
28 August 1993	Kilmarnock	H	1–2	44,243	Pressley
4 September 1993	Dundee	A	1–1	14,211	Hateley
11 September 1993	Partick Thistle	H	1–1	40,988	Hateley
18 September 1993	Aberdeen	A	0–2	19,138	
25 September 1993	Hibernian	H	2–1	43,200	Steven, Hateley
2 October 1993	Raith Rovers	A	1–1	8,161	Hetherston (o.g.)
6 October 1993	Motherwell	H	1–2	39,816	I. Ferguson
9 October 1993	Dundee United	A	3–1	11,262	Huistra (2), Hateley
16 October 1993	St Johnstone	H	2–0	41,960	Huistra, Hateley
30 October 1993	Celtic	H	1–2	47,522	McCoist
3 November 1993	Heart of Midlothian	A	2–2	18,370	Hateley (2)
6 November 1993	Kilmarnock	A	2–0	19,162	I. Ferguson, Huistra
10 November 1993	Dundee	H	3–1	38,477	McCoist (2, 1 (pen.)), I. Ferguson
13 November 1993	Raith Rovers	H	2–2	42,611	Hateley (2)
20 November 1993	Hibernian	A	1–0	16,506	Gough
27 November 1993	Partick Thistle	A	1–1	17,292	Huistra
1 December 1993	Aberdeen	H	2–0	45,182	Hateley (2)
4 December 1993	Motherwell	A	2–0	14,069	Durie (2)
11 December 1993	Dundee United	H	0–3	43,058	
18 December 1993	St Johnstone	A	4–0	10,056	Hateley (2), Steven, Durie
27 December 1993	Heart of Midlothian	H	2–2	45,116	Hateley (2)
1 January 1994	Celtic	A	4–2	48,506	Mikhailichenko (2), Hateley, Kuznetsov
8 January 1994	Kilmarnock	H	3–0	44,919	Hateley (2), Huistra
15 January 1994	Dundee	A	1–1	11,014	Durie
22 January 1994	Aberdeen	A	0–0	20,267	
5 February 1994	Partick Thistle	H	5–1	42,606	Durie (2), Mikhailichenko, McCall, Steven
12 February 1994	Hibernian	H	2–0	43,265	Durie, Steven
26 February 1994	Raith Rovers	A	2–1	8,988	I. Ferguson, Durie
5 March 1994	Motherwell	H	2–1	43,669	Durie, Hateley (pen.)
19 March 1994	St Johnstone	H	4–0	43,228	McCall, Hateley, McPherson, Durie
26 March 1994	Heart of Midlothian	A	2–1	18,108	McCoist, Hateley
29 March 1994	Partick Thistle	A	2–1	14,706	Gough, McCoist
2 April 1994	Aberdeen	H	1–1	45,888	McCall
5 April 1994	Dundee United	A	0–0	11,352	
16 April 1994	Raith Rovers	H	4–0	42,545	Robertson, McCoist, D. Ferguson, Mikhailichenko
23 April 1994	Dundee United	H	2–1	44,776	Durie (2)
26 April 1994	Motherwell	A	1–2	14,050	McCoist
30 April 1994	Celtic	H	1–1	47,018	Mikhailichenko
3 May 1994	Hibernian	A	0–1	14,517	
7 May 1994	Kilmarnock	A	0–1	18,012	
14 May 1994	Dundee	H	0–0	41,620	

=== Scottish League Cup ===
Date	Round	Opponent	Venue	Result	Attendance	Scorers
11 August 1993	R2	Dumbarton	H	1–0	36,309	I. Ferguson
25 August 1993	R3	Dunfermline Athletic	A	2–0	12,993	Steven, I. Ferguson
1 September 1993	QF	Aberdeen	H	2–1	45,604	Hateley, I. Ferguson
22 September 1993	SF	Celtic	H	1–0	47,420	Hateley
24 October 1993	F	Hibernian	N	2–1	47,632	Durrant, McCoist

=== Scottish Cup ===
Date	Round	Opponent	Venue	Result	Attendance	Scorers
29 January 1994	R3	Dumbarton	H	4–1	36,809	Durie, Hateley (pen.), Steven, Robertson
19 February 1994	R4	Alloa Athletic	H	6–0	37,804	McCoist (3, 1 (pen.)), I. Ferguson, McPherson, Newbigging (o.g.)
12 March 1994	QF	Heart of Midlothian	H	2–0	41,666	Brown, Hateley
10 April 1994	SF	Kilmarnock	N	0–0	35,144	
13 April 1994	SF R	Kilmarnock	N	2–1	29,860	Hateley (2)
21 May 1994	F	Dundee United	N	0–1	37,450	

=== UEFA Champions League ===
Date	Round	Opponent	Venue	Result	Attendance	Scorers
15 September 1993	R1	(Bulgaria) Levski Sofia	H	3–2	37,013	Hateley (2), McPherson
29 September 1993	R1	(Bulgaria) Levski Sofia	A	1–2	50,000	Durrant

== Appearances ==
Player	Position	Appearances	Goals
(Scotland) Andy Goram	GK	10	0
(Scotland) Ally Maxwell	GK	43	0
(Scotland) Colin Scott	GK	6	0
(Scotland) John Brown	DF	28	1
(Scotland) Richard Gough	DF	48	3
(Ukraine) Oleh Kuznetsov	DF	6	1
(Scotland) Dave McPherson	DF	37	3
(Australia) Craig Moore	DF	1	0
(Scotland) Steven Pressley	DF	29	1
(Scotland) David Robertson	DF	41	2
(England) Gary Stevens	DF	37	0
(England) Chris Vinnicombe	DF	5	0
(Scotland) Fraser Wishart	DF	10	0
(Scotland) Ian Durrant	MF	31	2
(Scotland) Ian Ferguson	MF	47	9
(Scotland) David Hagen	MF	8	1
(Netherlands) Pieter Huistra	MF	26	6
(Scotland) Stuart McCall	MF	44	3
(Scotland) Charlie Miller	MF	3	0
(Scotland) Neil Murray	MF	27	0
(Ukraine) Oleksiy Mykhaylychenko	MF	40	5
(England) Trevor Steven	MF	42	6
(Scotland) Gordon Durie	FW	29	13
(Scotland) Duncan Ferguson	FW	16	1
(England) Mark Hateley	FW	55	30
(Scotland) Ally McCoist	FW	28	11
(Northern Ireland) John Morrow	FW	3	0

== League table ==
Pos	Team	Pld	W	D	L	GF	GA	GD	Pts	Qualification or relegation
1	Rangers (C)	44	22	14	8	74	41	+33	58	Qualification for the Champions League qualifying round
2	Aberdeen	44	17	21	6	58	36	+22	55	Qualification for the UEFA Cup preliminary round
3	Motherwell	44	20	14	10	58	43	+15	54	Qualification for the UEFA Cup preliminary round
4	Celtic	44	15	20	9	51	38	+13	50	
5	Hibernian	44	16	15	13	53	48	+5	47	

Source: RSSSF
Rules for classification: 1) points; 2) goal difference; 3) number of goals scored.
(C) Champions

== See also ==
- 1993–94 in Scottish football
- Nine in a row
