= 1993–94 Partick Thistle F.C. season =

Partick Thistle
1993–94 season
- Manager: John Lambie
- Stadium: Firhill Stadium
- Scottish Premier Division: 9th
- Scottish Cup: Third round
- Scottish League Cup: Quarter-final
- Highest home attendance: 16,890 vs Rangers, Premier Division, 27 November 1993
- Lowest home attendance: 3,295 vs St Johnstone, Premier Division, 22 March 1994
- Average home league attendance: 6,607

During the 1993–94 season, Partick Thistle competed in the Scottish Premier Division, in which they finished 9th.

== Scottish Premier Division ==
=== League table ===
Pos	Team	Pld	W	D	L	GF	GA	GD	Pts	Qualification or relegation
7	Heart of Midlothian	44	11	20	13	37	43	−6	42	
8	Kilmarnock	44	12	16	16	36	45	−9	40	
9	Partick Thistle	44	12	16	16	46	57	−11	40	
10	St Johnstone (R)	44	10	20	14	35	47	−12	40	Relegation to the 1994–95 Scottish First Division
11	Raith Rovers (R)	44	6	19	19	46	80	−34	31	Relegation to the 1994–95 Scottish First Division

Source: RSSSF
Rules for classification: 1) points; 2) goal difference; 3) number of goals scored.
(R) Relegated

=== Matches ===
Win	Draw	Loss

Scottish Premier Division results
Date	Opponent	Venue	Result F–A	Scorers	Attendance
7 August 1993	Hibernian	A	0–0		7,452
14 August 1993	Dundee United	H	1–2	Craig	4,599
21 August 1993	Raith Rovers	A	2–2	Britton, Grant	3,814
28 August 1993	Celtic	H	0–1		14,013
4 September 1993	Heart of Midlothian	A	1–2	Britton	7,273
11 September 1993	Rangers	A	1–1	Grant	40,998
18 September 1993	Motherwell	H	1–0	Craig	5,947
25 September 1993	Kilmarnock	A	1–3	Craig	7,411
2 October 1993	St Johnstone	H	4–1	Grant (3), Taylor	3,402
5 October 1993	Dundee	A	2–2	Shaw, Taylor	4,540
9 October 1993	Aberdeen	H	3–2	Taylor, Craig, Grant	5,600
16 October 1993	Dundee United	A	2–2	Milne, Grant	5,750
23 October 1993	Heart of Midlothian	H	0–0		7,170
30 October 1993	Raith Rovers	H	1–1	Craig	4,375
2 November 1993	Hibernian	H	0–0		3,815
6 November 1993	Celtic	A	0–3		21,642
13 November 1993	St Johnstone	A	3–1	Craig, Britton, Grant	3,548
20 November 1993	Kilmarnock	H	0–1		5,876
27 November 1993	Rangers	H	1–1	English	16,890
30 November 1993	Motherwell	A	0–1		5,362
4 December 1993	Dundee	H	3–2	Taylor, Craig (2, 1 pen.)	3,312
15 December 1993	Aberdeen	A	1–2	Craig	8,248
18 December 1993	Dundee United	H	1–0	Craig	4,121
27 December 1993	Hibernian	A	1–5	Tierney	10,165
8 January 1994	Celtic	H	1–0	Shaw	12,887
12 January 1994	Raith Rovers	A	1–0	Grant	3,599
15 January 1994	Heart of Midlothian	A	0–1		7,619
22 January 1994	Motherwell	H	0–0		5,237
5 February 1994	Rangers	A	1–5	Cameron	42,606
12 February 1994	Kilmarnock	A	2–1	Craig, Grant	7,511
5 March 1994	Dundee	A	0–1		3,210
19 March 1994	Dundee United	A	2–2	Charnley (pen.), Jamieson	6,005
22 March 1994	St Johnstone	H	0–0		3,295
26 March 1994	Hibernian	H	1–0	Grant	4,632
29 March 1994	Rangers	H	1–2	English	12,000
2 April 1994	Motherwell	A	2–2	English, Grant	6,444
5 April 1994	Aberdeen	H	1–1	Grant	4,280
16 April 1994	St Johnstone	A	0–1		4,933
19 April 1994	Kilmarnock	H	1–0	Craig	6,981
23 April 1994	Aberdeen	A	0–2		7,827
26 April 1994	Dundee	H	1–0	Craig	3,296
30 April 1994	Raith Rovers	H	2–2	English, Craig	4,225
7 May 1994	Celtic	A	1–1	Smith	16,827
14 May 1994	Heart of Midlothian	H	0–1		9,391

== Scottish Cup ==
Win	Draw	Loss

Scottish Cup results
Round	Date	Opponent	Venue	Result F–A	Scorers	Attendance
Third round	29 January 1994	Heart of Midlothian	H	0–1		9,519

== Scottish League Cup ==
Win	Draw	Loss

Scottish League Cup results
Round	Date	Opponent	Venue	Result F–A	Scorers	Attendance
Second round	11 August 1993	Albion Rovers	A	11–1	Craig (2), Britton, English, Jamieson, Law, Cameron (4), Grant	1,448
Third round	24 August 1993	Greenock Morton	A	1–0	Craig	4,124
Quarter-final	31 August 1993	Hibernian	H	2–2 (a.e.t.) (2–3 p)	Grant, Craig	7,688
