= Stuart McCall =

English footballer (born 1964)

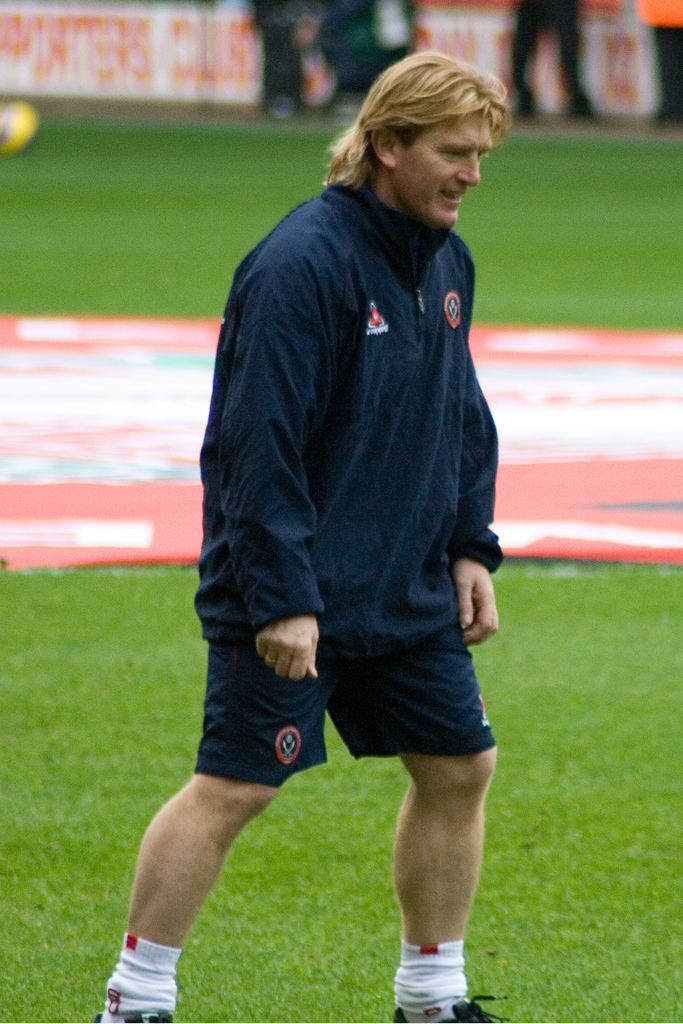
- McCall in 2007

Personal information
- Full name: Andrew Stuart Murray McCall
- Date of birth: 10 June 1964 (age 62)
- Place of birth: Leeds, England
- Position: Midfielder

Youth career
- Pudsey Juniors
- Holbeck
- Farsley Celtic
- 1980–1982: Bradford City

Senior career*
Years	Team	Apps	(Gls)
1982–1988	Bradford City	238	(37)
1988–1991	Everton	103	(6)
1991–1998	Rangers	194	(14)
1998–2002	Bradford City	157	(8)
2002–2005	Sheffield United	71	(2)
Total		763	(67)

International career
1988–1990	Scotland U21	2	(0)
1990–1998	Scotland	40	(1)

Managerial career
- 2000: Bradford City (caretaker)
- 2007–2010: Bradford City
- 2010–2014: Motherwell
- 2015: Rangers
- 2016–2018: Bradford City
- 2018–2019: Scunthorpe United
- 2020: Bradford City
- * Club domestic league appearances and goals

Andrew Stuart Murray McCall (born 10 June 1964) is a professional football coach and former player.

McCall played in a total of 763 league games and in 40 full international matches for Scotland during his playing career. He is also one of the few footballers to have made over 1,000 competitive appearances.

McCall started his career with Bradford City, where he made his first-team debut in 1982. He played six seasons at Valley Parade, during which time he won the Division Three championship, a title which was overshadowed by the Bradford City stadium fire when 56 people died and in which his father Andy was injured. After missing out on promotion in 1987–88, McCall moved to Everton, for whom he scored twice but finished on the losing side in the 1989 FA Cup Final. In 1991, he moved to Rangers, with whom he spent seven seasons and won five league titles, three Scottish Cups and two Scottish League Cups. McCall returned to Bradford City as captain to take them into the top division of English football for the first time in 77 years. After four seasons he moved to Sheffield United, where he retired as a player in 2005.

Born and raised in England, McCall qualified to play for Scotland through his Scottish father. He won 40 international caps and scored one goal in the 1990 FIFA World Cup in Italy. He also played in two European Championships but his international career ended after he was left out of the 1998 World Cup squad.

McCall was part of the coaching staff during his second playing spell at Bradford City, briefly serving as caretaker-player manager in 2000. He continued his coaching at Sheffield United and was assistant manager to Neil Warnock until May 2007, when he returned to Bradford City as their manager. He spent two and a half seasons in charge of Bradford City, leaving in February 2010. Just before the end of 2010, he was appointed Motherwell manager. He stayed at Fir Park for four years, helping the club finish second in the league twice. After a poor start to the 2014–15 season, he resigned in November 2014. McCall was appointed manager of Rangers in March 2015, but left the club at the end of a short-term contract. He returned to Bradford City for a second spell as manager in June 2016. The team reached the play-off final in his first season, but this was lost and he was sacked in February 2018. After a short spell with Scunthorpe United, McCall was appointed Bradford manager for a third time in February 2020.

== Early and personal life ==
Stuart McCall was born in Leeds, West Riding of Yorkshire, England, to Scottish parents Andy, a former professional footballer, and Jean McCall. He was the couple's third child after Leslie and Janette, who were 20 and 15 respectively when Stuart was born. The family home was close to Leeds United's Elland Road ground where McCall would spend many Saturday afternoons watching United, dreaming of following his father and playing for Leeds, even after the family moved to Wortley.

McCall played football for Upper Wortley Primary School and Thornhill Middle School, even scoring a winning goal for the latter in a cup final when he came on as a substitute with his arm in a sling. While McCall also played table tennis as a schoolboy, football was a focus, and he captained the Leeds under-11 boys team and played for other Leeds representative sides.

McCall's parents split and he made up for his size when he moved to one of Leeds' toughest estates and played for pub sides by the age of 14. He moved schools to Harrington High and also played for local young sides Pudsey Juniors, Holbeck and later Farsley Celtic. McCall thought he had missed his chance of playing professionally after a string of other players were signed by professional clubs, until Farsley played Bradford City's junior side in a friendly and he impressed coach Bryan Edwards enough to be asked for a trial.

His son Craig was also a footballer.

== Playing career ==
=== Club career ===
==== Bradford City ====
McCall was signed by George Mulhall in 1980 from Farsley Celtic on his 16th birthday, before becoming one of the club's two apprentices in June 1981. Mulhall's successor, Roy McFarland, gave McCall his first-team debut at Reading on 28 August 1982 – the opening day of the 1982–83 season – when he deputised for Ces Podd at right back. He had played just six league games by 29 January 1983 when he made the first of 134 consecutive league appearances, all in midfield under new manager Trevor Cherry. City finished 12th in Division Three that season. The following season City struggled to make up for the absence of Bobby Campbell, who had left to join Derby County, and won just one of their first fifteen games, until Cherry bought Campbell back from Derby, and City won a record ten consecutive games on their way to a seventh-place finish.

During the summer of 1984, Cherry made the two key signings of central defender Dave Evans and right winger John Hendrie to build on the previous season's high finish. McCall was an integral part of the team as City won the Division Three championship in 1984–85, during which he scored eight goals as one of two ever-present players. The title was assured in the penultimate game when McCall scored the second goal in a 2–0 victory over Bolton Wanderers. The league title was paraded before the final game of the season on 11 May 1985 at home to Lincoln City. However, the club's title was overshadowed when 56 people died in the Bradford City stadium fire when the Valley Parade ground's main stand caught fire after 40 minutes of play, during which McCall's father, who was with other family members, was badly injured. After the fire, McCall, still in his kit, spent several hours driving from the ground to his sister's house, then to Bradford Royal Infirmary and Pinderfields Hospital trying to find his father. His father had suffered severe burns and needed skin grafts on his hands and head and was in hospital for several weeks.

For the following 19 months, the club played games away from Valley Parade. Cherry and the players became a close-knit team, attending funerals of the victims and other engagements in the months that followed, and the club's 13th-place finish in Division Two in 1985–86 was hailed a major achievement. During Bradford's time away from Valley Parade, McCall also turned his back on Leeds United, the team he had supported as a child, after their fans set fire to a chip van at Odsal Stadium. McCall became club captain in November 1986, aged just 21, after Peter Jackson moved to Newcastle United. Under Cherry's replacement, Terry Dolan, the club held off any relegation threats to finish tenth in 1986–87. Like Jackson, McCall and Hendrie were both keen to move to a Division One club, but they agreed in 1987 to stay for one final season.

Dolan brought in Paul Tomlinson, Brian Mitchell and Lee Sinnott in a bid to help McCall and Hendrie realise their dreams with City. They mounted a promotion challenge in 1987–88 and were top for much of the season until they faltered in the New Year. When promotion was missed initially by one point on the last day of the season after a 3–2 defeat against Ipswich Town and then through play-off defeat to Middlesbrough, McCall left the club, signing for Everton for £850,000 in June 1988. He had played 238 league games for the club, scoring 37 goals, and in total played 285 games, scoring 46 goals. McCall was later outspoken in his autobiography, The Real McCall, about City's failure to strengthen the side to secure promotion.

I thought about transfer deadline day and Tordoff saying we should sell before buying. One or two new faces would have taken us over the finishing line, I was sure of it, and it nagged away. It wasn't about gambling, it was about lack of ambition.

— Stuart McCall, The Real McCall

His departure was soured when he was forced to go to the Football League with a Professional Footballers' Association representative to win £8,327.15 of an unpaid signing-on fee.

==== Everton ====
McCall joined Everton at a time when its former triumphant side of the mid-1980s had broken up, following the ban on English sides competing in Europe, which marked the start of a period of underachievement at Goodison Park. His Everton debut came in a 4–0 victory over Newcastle United on 27 August 1988 against his former teammate Hendrie, who was making his debut for Newcastle. McCall also returned to Valley Parade for a League Cup tie, but his Everton side were knocked out by Bradford 3–1 on 14 December 1988. He started 29 league games in 1988–89 as well as another four substitute appearances, but failed to score in the league. He was also a substitute in the 1989 FA Cup Final when he scored Everton's stoppage time equaliser in the Merseyside derby against Liverpool to take the game into extra-time. He scored another equaliser during extra-time, but Liverpool's own substitute Ian Rush also scored two to secure a 3–2 victory for Liverpool.

McCall made a second appearance in an Everton shirt at Valley Parade, when he was invited by former teammate Mark Ellis to bring a side for his testimonial. In three seasons at Everton, McCall played 103 league games as well as earned his first caps with Scotland but he failed to lift any trophies as the club finished eighth, sixth and ninth in the league. Apart from the FA Cup final defeat in 1989, the closest he came to winning a trophy at Everton was in the 1989–90 season, when Everton topped the league in late autumn and remained in contention for the title for most of the rest of the season until disappointing form in the run-in saw them finish sixth.

==== Rangers ====
In the summer of 1991, McCall signed for Scottish club Rangers for £1.2 million. Rangers had just won their third successive Scottish Premier Division title.

Under newly appointed manager Walter Smith, McCall ended up playing in the final six of the club's nine successive Scottish league titles, and with Rangers also winning a string of cup competitions during that time, McCall picked up a total of ten major trophies north of the border. In his first season at Ibrox, Rangers won the league and cup double, before they achieved greater success in 1992–93, winning both cups 2–1 against Aberdeen and coming nine points ahead of Aberdeen in the league. McCall also enjoyed European success that season when the Glasgow club narrowly missed out on an appearance in the UEFA Champions League 1992–93 final, coming second in the semi-final group stage to eventual winners Olympique de Marseille. Citing the reason for their success as the spirit which Smith instilled in the team, McCall later said: "It was an incredible season. We won the domestic Treble, we went 44 games unbeaten and we did not lose a single game in Europe. And, though we said we would do it again next year, we all knew it was unrepeatable." He placed fourth for the SFWA award in 1993.

In 1993–94, Rangers added another Scottish League Cup title along with the league championship, but lost 1–0 in the final of the Scottish Cup to Dundee United, surprisingly being denied a second successive treble. The following season saw Rangers win the league by their greatest margin as they finished 15 points ahead of Motherwell, but they failed to reach the final of either of the domestic cups. Although their winning margin was reduced to four points, from city rivals Celtic, in 1995–96, Rangers' points tally of 87 was a record-high total.

McCall played in his fourth Scottish Cup final as Rangers defeated Hearts 5–1. His Rangers side again pushed Celtic into second place in 1996–97 and defeated Hearts 4–3 in the Scottish League Cup (McCall had suffered an injury prior to that final which ruled him out until the end of the season, and he did not play in sufficient league games for a medal). But with the club chasing an unprecedented 10th straight title in 1997–98 they had to settle for the runners-up position, with Celtic winning the league by two points on the final day of the season. McCall was substituted in the Scottish Cup final defeat to Hearts as Rangers went the season without picking up a single title for the first season in McCall's time at the club. In February 2008, McCall became the 71st inductee into the Rangers hall of fame. McCall's former teammate and Rangers assistant manager Ally McCoist presented him with the award.

==== Return to Bradford City ====
McCall still had one year left on his Rangers contract in 1998, but much of the team that Walter Smith had built had left and McCall was allowed to leave on a free transfer by new manager Dick Advocaat, as long as he joined an English club. Barnsley and Huddersfield Town were both interested in signing McCall, but he rejoined Bradford City as club captain. Rookie manager Paul Jewell put together a squad which emerged as surprise promotion contenders after two seasons spent battling relegation, adding other new signings, including central midfield partner Gareth Whalley and striker Lee Mills, who went on to be club's top goal-scorer. The season started off slowly with just one win from the first seven games, but by the latter half of the season, City were vying with Ipswich Town and Birmingham City for the second promotion spot behind runaway leaders Sunderland. Loan signing Lee Sharpe and Dean Windass were added to the ranks and City had the chance to seal promotion in their penultimate game against relegation-threatened Oxford United. The game finished as a 0–0 draw, with McCall heading over the goal in the final minutes, taking the promotion bid to the final game of the season. Days later he was named the club's player of the year. A 3–2 victory over Wolverhampton Wanderers at Molineux on 9 May 1999 ensured promotion to the Premier League and denied Ipswich Town – the team that had thwarted McCall and Bradford 11 years before.

Bradford were expected to struggle in their first season in the top flight for 77 years. Jewell signed David Wetherall, Dean Saunders and Neil Redfearn, all experienced top flight performers, but City were in the bottom four teams for most of the season. It was Bradford's home form – they earned 26 of their 36 points at Valley Parade – that was key to City avoiding relegation, which was narrowly averted by two points after a shock 1–0 final day victory over Liverpool in 1999–2000, sending Wimbledon down instead. When Jewell left only days after the season ended, McCall was appointed assistant manager to Chris Hutchings, and subsequently served as caretaker manager for two games when Hutchings was dismissed after just 12 games of the 2000–01 league season. City were relegated with just 26 points. During a 6–1 defeat to West Yorkshire rivals Leeds United in the penultimate game, McCall and team-mate Andy Myers fought on the pitch.

McCall stayed on for one more season before he was released by manager Nicky Law in May 2002, shortly before the club went into administration for the first time after finishing 15th in Division One. His playing career at Bradford City had looked uncertain in December 2001 before Law arrived, when previous manager Jim Jefferies had left McCall out of the side in a 3–1 defeat at Manchester City following a training ground dispute. However, it was Jefferies who lost out in the dispute when he resigned his post a week later after summit talks with chairman Geoffrey Richmond. In April 2002, McCall's testimonial match against Rangers attracted a crowd of more than 21,000 to Valley Parade. McCall gave part of the proceeds from his testimonial to the Bradford burns research unit, which was set up following the 1985 fire. Two years after his benefit match, McCall played one more time in City colours in a Save Our City appeal match organised by Bradford's evening newspaper, the Telegraph & Argus, to raise funds for the club, who were now in administration for a second time.

==== Sheffield United ====
On 2 July 2002. McCall joined Sheffield United, where he played an integral part in their first-team side, despite being 38, and also coached the reserves to the league title. He played 71 league games over the next two seasons, and scored twice, including a winner against former side Bradford. He was in the side that reached the Division One play-off final in 2003 as well as the semi-finals of both cup competitions that year. However, he and Dean Windass, who was also now at Sheffield United, were both left out of the play-off final, as United lost 3–0 to Wolverhampton Wanderers. McCall played just two League Cup games in the 2004–05 season, and retired just a few weeks before his 41st birthday. His career total of 763 league games placed him in 13th position on the all-time appearance list of British footballers.

=== International career ===
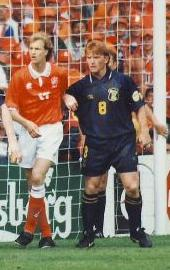
McCall (right) playing for Scotland during Euro 96

McCall was picked for England and Scotland under-21 sides on the same day in 1984, and chose to join the England under-21 squad for their game against Turkey. However he was only picked as a substitute and the referee blew the final whistle, with McCall waiting to come on. He later told Scottish newspaper Glasgow Herald, "I felt it was a mistake almost from the start. I was put on the bench and they tried to bring me on with a minute to go. But I took my time re-tying my boots and generally warming up and luckily didn't get on, otherwise that would have been that." Since he had not actually played for England, McCall was still eligible for Scotland. He eventually switched allegiances to the latter, for whom he qualified through his father. He made his Scotland debut at under-21 level in March 1988, ironically against England. McCall made one more appearance for Scotland under 21s, against France in 1990.

Later the same year, McCall was called up to the Scottish senior team. He won his first cap on 28 March 1990 in a 1–0 friendly victory over Argentina. He played in five friendlies in 1990 which earned him a call up to the Italia 90 World Cup squad. He played in all three of Scotland's World Cup games. They lost their first game 1–0 to Costa Rica, before McCall scored what would be his only international goal against Sweden in a 2–1 victory. However, Scotland failed to qualify for the knock-out stage when they were defeated 1–0 by Brazil.

McCall represented Scotland at the European Championships in 1992, when they again failed to go beyond the group stage after defeats to Netherlands and Germany, and in 1996 when they were edged out in the first round by Netherlands. Scotland failed to qualify for the World Cup in 1994. McCall played just two qualifying games for the 1998 World Cup and his last cap came in a friendly against Denmark on 25 March 1998, as he was overlooked for the final squad for the finals in France along with team-mate Ally McCoist. He was capped a total of 40 times for Scotland, scoring one goal. McCall's caps included 11 while at Everton and 29 during his career with Rangers.

== Coaching and managerial career ==
=== Early coaching career ===
In July 2000, McCall accepted his first coaching role, when he was appointed assistant manager to Chris Hutchings at Bradford City, after Hutchings was promoted from the role to replace Paul Jewell as City manager. Just four months later, Hutchings was sacked, and McCall was appointed as caretaker-player manager. His first game in the role was against his former team Everton, who were led by his former manager Walter Smith, but ended with a 1–0 defeat. He was in charge for one more game, which also ended in defeat, until Jim Jefferies was appointed the new manager. Jefferies brought with him his own assistant Billy Brown, and McCall was appointed first-team coach.

After leaving Bradford City, he joined Sheffield United, where he also took up a coaching role. When he retired in 2004, he remained at Sheffield United as assistant to Neil Warnock. Working alongside Warnock and learning the managerial ropes from him, he helped mastermind The Blades' promotion to the Premier League in 2006. United were relegated to the Championship on the final day of the 2006–07 season and Warnock resigned three days later. McCall had already decided that the 2006–07 season would be his last as assistant manager, and when he was overlooked as a successor to the United manager's position, in favour of Bryan Robson, he decided to leave after five years with the club.

=== Bradford City (first period as manager) ===
McCall admitted in his autobiography, The Real McCall, he wanted to manage Bradford.

He had been linked with the manager's position at Bradford City on numerous previous occasions, and after Colin Todd was sacked on 12 February 2007, City chairman Julian Rhodes made McCall his number one target to take over in the summer. Club captain David Wetherall temporarily took over and was later announced as caretaker manager for the rest of the 2006–07 season. On 22 May 2007, it was announced McCall would become manager of the club where he started his career, and on 1 June 2007 he assumed the position. In less than seven years since McCall's first two-game reign, serious financial problems had driven the club to the verge of closure, and although they survived the threat of oblivion, they were unable to avoid a terrible on-the-pitch decline, which continued after the financial nightmare had been relieved. On McCall's return to Valley Parade, the Bantams had just been relegated to League Two—meaning that they would be playing in the bottom division for the first time in 25 years. McCall set himself a target of earning promotion back to League One in his first season.

Bradford had just 13 players when McCall took over, and he made a number of summer signings including defender Darren Williams, midfielders Kyle Nix, Alex Rhodes and Scott Phelan, and strikers Barry Conlon, Guylain Ndumbu-Nsungu and Peter Thorne. McCall recorded his first win as a manager against Wrexham on 25 August 2007 after substitute Luke Medley scored a late winner, but despite his pre-season target his team spent much of the first half of the season in the bottom half of the table. After going unbeaten in January, the club were still 15th in League Two, and McCall told the Telegraph & Argus he did not regret his pre-season target but was carried away with the euphoria at the time. City's form continued to improve during the second half of the season, and McCall led his side to 10th place in League Two.

Despite City finishing outside the play-off places, they were again installed as favourites for promotion by bookmakers for the 2008–09 season. McCall released 13 players from his squad and replaced them with a number of signings with experience in a higher division, as well as Michael Boulding, who was one of League Two's top goalscorers during the 2007–08 campaign. McCall's side made a good start to the season, and after winning five of their opening six league games, went top of the league – the first time City had led the table in seven years.

As a result of maintaining a place in the promotion places during the first half of the season and his "stabling influence" on the club, chairmen Julian Rhodes and Mark Lawn offered McCall a new contract in January 2009. Later in the month, Lawn gave further backing to McCall, who was coming under pressure from the club's fans following a run of one win in nine games; during the run McCall was also charged by The Football Association for the first time of his managerial career after he had contested a refereeing decision during a game with Luton Town. McCall signed a new contract in February, which extended his deal by another two years and would have kept him at the club until 2011. He set himself the goal of earning two promotions to put City in the Championship. However, less than a month later, McCall offered to resign if they did not reach the play-offs after his side lost 4–1 to AFC Bournemouth – their fifth consecutive away defeat. "Nobody is hurting more than me but it's as simple as that, if we miss out I don't deserve to be here," he said. City eventually missed out on promotion, but McCall decided to stay on as manager and took a voluntary pay cut in the process because of the club's budget being reduced.

As a result of the cuts, McCall made a number of changes to his squad during the summer of 2009. His team started the 2009–10 season by going four games without scoring, until they recorded a 5–4 victory against Cheltenham Town. After the game, McCall said: "That was the youngest, and certainly cheapest, team Bradford have put out for a long time and I'm really proud of them." City continued by going ten games unbeaten and reached the area semi-finals of the Football League Trophy where they lost to Carlisle United, managed by McCall's friend Greg Abbott, but at the start of 2010 found themselves 16th in League Two and eight points off the play-offs after a run of five defeats in seven games. McCall laid down a challenge to his team to win three of their next four games, saying: "The bottom line is that the players and me personally will get judged on results. And the results aren't good enough." Despite the club's slide down the table, he denied he would resign, but it was reported that two late goals from summer signing Gareth Evans to give City a late 2–1 away at Torquay United saved McCall from being sacked. However, defeat to Bury in the club's following fixture was McCall's last game as manager, with McCall saying after the game: "It's time for somebody else to come in and take up the reins and hopefully do well." He won a little more than one-third of his 133 games in charge of City. McCall left by mutual consent.

=== Motherwell ===
After leaving Bradford, McCall spent some time out of the game before being recruited to work as a scout for Norwich City by Rangers former chief scout Ewan Chester. At the end of 2010, he was among a number of men interviewed for the managerial vacancy at Scottish Premier League club Motherwell to succeed Craig Brown, before being given the job on a two-and-a-half-year contract. His first game in charge was a 0–0 draw away to Hamilton Academical on New Year's Day 2011. He followed it up with a 4–0 victory in the Scottish Cup against Dundee before his maiden league victory – and the club's first since November – against Hibernian by the end of January.

McCall was partly selected as new manager because of his knowledge of the lower leagues of English football; he was active in the transfer market in his early days, bringing in Steve Jones – a player he had at Bradford – and Mike Grella from Leeds United, although the latter move was cancelled because of a FIFA ruling limiting the number of clubs a player can sign for in one season. Having operated without an assistant for his first few weeks in charge, McCall chose former Airdrie United manager Kenny Black as his number two. McCall led Motherwell to the semi-finals of both Scottish Cup competitions – they were defeated 2–1 by his former side Rangers in the League Cup but reached the final of the Scottish Cup by defeating St Johnstone 3–0.

At the start of the following season, Motherwell lost only one match in their first six making them joint leaders of the Scottish Premier League, which led to McCall being named the Clydesdale Bank Premier League manager of the month for July and August. Well continued their good form, with McCall winning the award again in October, alongside player of the month Keith Lasley, in a month when the side went unbeaten. Motherwell's final position in the Premier League was in 3rd, allowing them into the Champions League for the first time in the club's history.

At the start of the 2012–13 season, McCall was unable to make signings after losing ten players. In the summer transfer window, he made two signings Simon Ramsden and Fraser Kerr. McCall attempted to sign the returning James McFadden and Ryan Stevenson, but both were unsuccessful. McCall then managed the club's first Champions League match in the second round against Panathinaikos, but they proved to be too strong and Motherwell failed to win either leg losing 2–0 and 3–0 respectively, which McCall described as "cruel". After the match, Motherwell entered the Europa League play-offs to face Levante; McCall wanted to play with an "up-and-at-them approach" against the Spaniards. Once again, their opposition proved to be too strong and they lost each leg 2–0 and 1–0 respectively, ending the club's European competitions; the second game at the Estadi Ciutat de València had Motherwell playing with a youthful and inexperienced squad due to injuries.

On 24 January 2013, it was announced McCall would join the backroom staff of new Scotland national football team manager Gordon Strachan. During the 2012/13 season, the club managed to stay in the top-six. On 28 March 2013, McCall signed a new two-year contract with Motherwell. In April 2013, McCall was awarded March's SPL manager of month for helping the club win three and draw one of their games during the month. At the end of the season, Motherwell finished second for the first time, their highest league position since 1994–95 season, which he described as "incredible". As a result, McCall won Clydesdale Bank Manager of the Year. On 22 May 2013, it was reported that he was set to open talks with Sheffield United about their managerial vacancy in the next 24 hours and that he had cut short a family holiday to intend the interview. Eventually, McCall rejected a move to Sheffield United, following talks between the two and was happy to continue as manager of Motherwell.

At the start of the 2013–14 season, key players Darren Randolph, Nicky Law, Chris Humphrey, Michael Higdon and Henrik Ojamaa all left the club. McCall replaced them by signing Paul Lawson, Iain Vigurs, John Sutton, Fraser Kerr, Gunnar Nielsen and Stephen McManus. He also managed to persuade James McFadden to stay at the club. Motherwell enjoyed another successful season, finishing second in the 2013–14 Scottish Premiership. The position was achieved by winning on the final day against nearest rivals Aberdeen. After a bad start to the 2014–15 season left Motherwell second from bottom, McCall resigned as manager on 2 November.

=== Rangers ===
McCall was appointed manager of Rangers on 12 March 2015, agreeing a contract with the club to the end of the 2014–15 season. In his first match in charge Rangers were held to a 1–1 draw at home by bottom-placed Livingston on 14 March 2015. Rangers finished third in the 2014–15 Scottish Championship and in the Premiership play-off final they were beaten 6–1 on aggregate by McCall's former team Motherwell. He said he had "done a decent job" and wanted to extend his contract for the following season. Rangers instead opted to appoint Mark Warburton as manager for the new season.

=== Bradford City (second period as manager) ===
McCall returned for a second period as manager of Bradford City on 20 June 2016, replacing Phil Parkinson. McCall gave up his coaching role with the Scotland national team. In his first season the team reached the 2017 EFL League One play-off final, but lost 1–0 to Millwall. After a run of six consecutive defeats, McCall was dismissed by Bradford on 5 February 2018. The team were still sitting in sixth place in 2017–18 EFL League One at the time of McCall's dismissal, but had fallen 13 points behind the automatic promotion places.

=== Scunthorpe United ===
McCall was appointed manager of League One club Scunthorpe United on 27 August 2018. After winning four out of their five games in January 2019, and climbing up the table to 14th position (and out of the relegation zone), McCall won the January 2019 League One Manager of the Month award. After this good run, however, the team won only two further matches and had dropped to 18th place when McCall was sacked in March 2019. Shortly afterwards, he stated he might not return to management, preferring the coaching side instead, stating: "It's a hard gig. I just like working with players, so I'd like to go out on a Monday to Friday or whatever it is and work with players and try and help improve them, put plans in there, formations, etc. And on the Saturday when it comes together – no better feeling."

In November 2019 he interviewed for the vacant post at Hearts.

=== Bradford City (third period as manager) ===
On 4 February 2020, McCall was appointed Bradford manager for a third time. He left the club on 13 December 2020.

=== Blackpool ===
McCall joined newly promoted Blackpool, as assistant head coach to Neil Critchley, on 22 July 2021. McCall's father played for the club in the 1940s and 1950s, and his sister was born in the town.

=== Sheffield United ===
On 25 November 2021, McCall left Blackpool to become assistant manager to Paul Heckingbottom at Sheffield United. Both Heckingbottom and McCall left the club in December 2023.

=== Preston North End ===
On 20 August 2024, following Heckingbottom's appointment, McCall was appointed assistant manager at Championship club Preston North End. On 13 September 2026, McCall left the club, following the sacking of Paul Heckingbottom.

== Style of play ==
McCall was a box-to-box midfielder characterised by his tireless running, tackling and also weighing in with an average of one goal every 11 games. Despite his position in the middle of the park he was rarely suspended and was sent off just once in his career – in the final minute of a 2–0 defeat to Charlton Athletic on 4 November 2000. He also had a never-say-die attitude proven by a number of key late goals including his equaliser which sent the 1989 FA Cup Final into extra-time, and a 93rd-minute equaliser against Tottenham Hotspur during Bradford's difficult start to their Premier League campaign in the 1999–2000 season. He was a passionate player with a strong desire to win games.

== Career statistics ==
=== Club ===
Club	Season	League			Cup (Note: Includes FA Cup, League Cup, Scottish Cup and Scottish League Cup.)		Europe		Total	
Club	Season	Division	Apps	Goals	Apps	Goals	Apps	Goals	Apps	Goals
Bradford City	1982–83	Third Division	28	4	2	0	—		30	4
Bradford City	1983–84	Third Division	46	5	4	0	—		50	5
Bradford City	1984–85	Third Division	46	8	7	1	—		53	9
Bradford City	1985–86	Third Division	38	4	4	2	—		42	6
Bradford City	1986–87	Third Division	36	7	4	1	—		40	8
Bradford City	1987–88	Third Division	44	9	9	2	—		53	11
Bradford City	Total		238	37	30	6	—		268	43
Everton	1988–89	First Division	33	0	9	4	—		42	4
Everton	1989–90	First Division	37	3	11	0	—		48	3
Everton	1990–91	First Division	33	3	9	0	—		42	3
Everton	Total		103	6	29	4	—		132	10
Rangers	1991–92	Scottish Premier Division	36	1	7	0	2	2	45	3
Rangers	1992–93	Scottish Premier Division	36	5	9	1	9	0	54	6
Rangers	1993–94	Scottish Premier Division	34	3	8	0	2	0	44	3
Rangers	1994–95	Scottish Premier Division	30	2	4	1	2	0	36	3
Rangers	1995–96	Scottish Premier Division	21	3	5	1	7	0	33	4
Rangers	1996–97	Scottish Premier Division	7	0	2	0	4	0	13	0
Rangers	1997–98	Scottish Premier Division	30	0	8	0	2	0	40	0
Rangers	Total		194	14	43	3	28	2	265	19
Bradford City	1998–99	First Division	43	3	5	0	—		48	3
Bradford City	1999–2000	Premier League	34	1	4	0	—		38	1
Bradford City	2000–01	Premier League	37	1	2	0	4	0	43	1
Bradford City	2001–02	First Division	43	3	3	1	—		46	4
Bradford City	Total		157	8	14	1	4	0	175	9
Sheffield United	2002–03	First Division	34	0	11	0	—		45	0
Sheffield United	2003–04	First Division	37	2	5	0	—		42	2
Sheffield United	2004–05	Championship	0	0	2	0	—		2	0
Sheffield United	Total		71	2	18	0	—		89	2
Career total			763	67	134	14	32	2	929	83

=== International appearances ===
National team	Season	Apps	Goals
Scotland	1990	9	1
Scotland	1991	5	0
Scotland	1992	8	0
Scotland	1993	2	0
Scotland	1994	6	0
Scotland	1995	1	0
Scotland	1996	8	0
Scotland	1997	0	0
Scotland	1998	1	0
Scotland	Total	40	1

=== International goals ===
Scores and results list Scotland's goal tally first.

#	Date	Venue	Opponent	Score	Result	Competition
1.	16 June 1990	Stadio Luigi Ferraris, Genoa, Italy	Sweden	1–0	2–1	1990 World Cup

=== Manager ===
As of match played 12 December 2020

Managerial record by team and tenure
Team	From	To	Record					Ref
Team	From	To	P	W	D	L	Win %	Ref
Bradford City (caretaker)	6 November 2000	20 November 2000	2	0	0	2	0.0	
Bradford City	1 June 2007	8 February 2010	133	46	35	52	34.6	
Motherwell	30 December 2010	2 November 2014	174	74	32	68	42.5	
Rangers	12 March 2015	14 June 2015	17	7	6	4	41.2	
Bradford City	20 June 2016	5 February 2018	96	44	24	28	45.8	
Scunthorpe United	27 August 2018	24 March 2019	39	12	8	19	30.8	
Bradford City	4 February 2020	13 December 2020	29	7	7	15	24.1	
Total			490	190	112	188	38.8	

== Honours ==
=== As a player ===
Bradford City

- Football League Third Division: 1984–85
- Football League First Division promotion: 1998–99

Everton

- FA Cup runner-up: 1988–89
- Full Members' Cup runner-up: 1988–89, 1990–91

Rangers

- Scottish Premier Division: 1991–92, 1992–93, 1993–94, 1994–95, 1995–96 (Note: Played insufficient matches in 1996–97 due to injury)
- Scottish Cup: 1991–92, 1992–93, 1995–96; runner-up 1993–94, 1997–98
- Scottish League Cup: 1992–93, 1993–94 (Note: Did not play in 1996–97 due to injury)

Individual

- PFA Team of the Year: 1984–85 Third Division, 1986–87 Third Division, 1987–88 Second Division

=== As a manager ===
Individual

- Manager of the Month: July/August 2011, October 2011, March 2013
- SPL Manager of the Season: 2012–13
- EFL League Two Manager of the Month: January 2019

== See also ==
- List of men's footballers with 1,000 or more official appearances
- List of footballers in England by number of league appearances (500+)
- List of Scotland international footballers born outside Scotland
