= 1993–94 Raith Rovers F.C. season =

Raith Rovers
1993–94 season
- Manager: Jimmy Nicholl (player-manager)
- Stadium: Stark's Park
- Scottish Premier Division: 11th (relegated)
- Scottish Cup: Fourth round
- Scottish League Cup: Second round
- Highest home attendance: 8,988 vs Rangers, Premier Division, 26 February 1994
- Lowest home attendance: 1,957 vs Arbroath, League Cup, 11 August 1993
- Average home league attendance: 4,880

During the 1993–94 season, Raith Rovers competed in the Scottish Premier Division, in which they finished 11th and were relegated to the 1994–95 Scottish First Division.

== Scottish Premier Division ==
=== League table ===
Pos	Team	Pld	W	D	L	GF	GA	GD	Pts	Qualification or relegation
8	Kilmarnock	44	12	16	16	36	45	−9	40	
9	Partick Thistle	44	12	16	16	46	57	−11	40	
10	St Johnstone (R)	44	10	20	14	35	47	−12	40	Relegation to the 1994–95 Scottish First Division
11	Raith Rovers (R)	44	6	19	19	46	80	−34	31	Relegation to the 1994–95 Scottish First Division
12	Dundee (R)	44	8	13	23	42	57	−15	29	Relegation to the 1994–95 Scottish First Division

Source: RSSSF
Rules for classification: 1) points; 2) goal difference; 3) number of goals scored.
(R) Relegated

=== Matches ===
Win	Draw	Loss

Scottish Premier Division results
Date	Opponent	Venue	Result F–A	Scorers	Attendance
7 August 1993	St Johnstone	H	1–1	Dennis	4,628
14 August 1993	Heart of Midlothian	A	0–1		8,587
21 August 1993	Partick Thistle	H	2–2	Dennis, Dalziel (pen.)	3,814
28 August 1993	Motherwell	A	1–4	Coyle	5,644
4 September 1993	Dundee United	H	1–1	Nicholl	5,304
11 September 1993	Celtic	H	1–4	Crawford	8,114
18 September 1993	Dundee	A	1–0	Hetherston	4,213
25 September 1993	Aberdeen	A	1–4	Dennis	11,472
2 October 1993	Rangers	H	1–1	McStay	8,161
5 October 1993	Hibernian	A	2–3	Dair, Rowbotham	9,197
9 October 1993	Kilmarnock	H	2–2	Graham, Dair	4,482
16 October 1993	Heart of Midlothian	H	1–0	Hetherston	5,278
23 October 1993	St Johnstone	A	1–1	Dair	4,411
30 October 1993	Partick Thistle	A	1–1	Cameron	4,375
6 November 1993	Motherwell	H	0–3		4,443
9 November 1993	Dundee United	A	2–2	Dair, Crawford	5,775
13 November 1993	Rangers	A	2–2	Dalziel (pen.), Graham	42,611
27 November 1993	Celtic	A	0–2		17,453
1 December 1993	Dundee	H	2–1	Dalziel (2)	3,609
4 December 1993	Hibernian	H	1–2	Graham	4,407
7 December 1993	Aberdeen	H	1–1	Dalziel	4,205
11 December 1993	Kilmarnock	A	0–1		6,012
18 December 1993	Heart of Midlothian	A	1–0	Sinclair	6,227
12 January 1994	Partick Thistle	H	0–1		3,599
15 January 1994	Dundee United	H	0–2		5,150
18 January 1994	St Johnstone	H	1–1	Dalziel	3,693
22 January 1994	Dundee	A	2–2	Blake (o.g.), Dalziel	3,784
25 January 1994	Motherwell	A	1–3	Cameron	5,016
5 February 1994	Celtic	H	0–0		7,678
12 February 1994	Aberdeen	A	0–4		10,553
26 February 1994	Rangers	H	1–2	Crawford	8,988
5 March 1994	Hibernian	A	0–3		6,042
15 March 1994	Kilmarnock	H	3–2	Graham, Cameron, Hetherston (pen.)	3,585
19 March 1994	Heart of Midlothian	H	2–2	McStay, Cameron	5,697
26 March 1994	St Johnstone	A	0–2		4,550
30 March 1994	Celtic	A	1–2	Crawford	14,140
2 April 1994	Dundee	H	1–1	Crawford	3,245
16 April 1994	Rangers	A	0–4		42,545
23 April 1994	Kilmarnock	A	0–0		7,426
26 April 1994	Hibernian	H	1–1	Cameron	3,040
30 April 1994	Partick Thistle	A	2–2	Hetherston (pen.), Cameron	4,225
3 May 1994	Aberdeen	H	0–2		2,798
7 May 1994	Motherwell	H	3–3	Graham, Dalziel, Hetherston	3,449
14 May 1994	Dundee United	A	3–2	Dair (2), Sinclair	5,335

== Scottish Cup ==
Win	Draw	Loss

Scottish Cup results
Round	Date	Opponent	Venue	Result F–A	Scorers	Attendance
Third round	29 January 1994	Brechin City	H	2–0	Dair, McStay	2,846
Fourth round	19 February 1994	Aberdeen	A	0–1		13,740

== Scottish League Cup ==
Win	Draw	Loss

Scottish League Cup results
Round	Date	Opponent	Venue	Result F–A	Scorers	Attendance
Second round	11 August 1993	Arbroath	H	1–2	Cameron	1,957
