= 1993–94 Celtic F.C. season =

Celtic
1993–94 season
- Chairman: Kevin Kelly
- Manager: Liam Brady, Frank Connor, Lou Macari
- Stadium: Celtic Park
- Scottish Premier Division: 4th
- Scottish Cup: Third round
- Scottish League Cup: Semi-finalists
- UEFA Cup: Second round
- Top goalscorer: League: Pat McGinlay (10); All: Pat McGinlay (12)
- Highest home attendance: 48,506
- Lowest home attendance: 9,887
- Average home league attendance: 22,636
Home colours

During the 1993–94 Scottish football season, Celtic competed in the Scottish Premier Division.

== Competitions ==
=== Scottish Premier Division ===
==== League table ====
Pos	Team	Pld	W	D	L	GF	GA	GD	Pts	Qualification or relegation
2	Aberdeen	44	17	21	6	58	36	+22	55	Qualification for the UEFA Cup preliminary round
3	Motherwell	44	20	14	10	58	43	+15	54	Qualification for the UEFA Cup preliminary round
4	Celtic	44	15	20	9	51	38	+13	50	
5	Hibernian	44	16	15	13	53	48	+5	47	
6	Dundee United	44	11	20	13	47	48	−1	42	Qualification for the Cup Winners' Cup first round

Source: RSSSF
Rules for classification: 1) points; 2) goal difference; 3) number of goals scored.

==== Matches ====
7 August 1993 Premier League	Motherwell	2–2	Celtic	Motherwell
15:00				Stadium: Fir Park; Attendance: 13,569

14 August 1993 Premier League	Celtic	1–1	Hibernian	Glasgow
15:00				Stadium: Celtic Park; Attendance: 27,690

21 August 1993 Premier League	Celtic	0–0	Rangers	Glasgow
15:00				Stadium: Celtic Park; Attendance: 47,942

28 August 1993 Premier League	Partick Thistle	0–1	Celtic	Glasgow
15:00				Stadium: Firhill Park; Attendance: 14,013

4 September 1993 Premier League	Celtic	0–1	Aberdeen	Glasgow
15:00				Stadium: Celtic Park; Attendance: 34,311

11 September 1993 Premier League	Raith Rovers	1–4	Celtic	Kirkcaldy
15:00 GMT				Stadium: Stark's Park; Attendance: 8,114

18 September 1993 Premier League	Celtic	1–1	Dundee United	Glasgow
15:00 GMT				Stadium: Celtic Park; Attendance: 26,377

25 September 1993 Premier League	Hearts	1–0	Celtic	Edinburgh
15:00 GMT				Stadium: Tynecastle Park; Attendance: 14,761

2 October 1993 Premier League	Celtic	0–0	Kilmarnock	Glasgow
15:00 GMT				Stadium: Celtic Park; Attendance: 23,396

6 October 1993 Premier League	St Johnstone	2–1	Celtic	Perth
19:45 GMT				Stadium: McDiarmid Park; Attendance: 7,386

9 October 1993 Premier League	Celtic	2–1	Dundee	Glasgow
15:00 GMT				Stadium: Celtic Park; Attendance: 15,980

16 October 1993 Premier League	Hibernian	1–1	Celtic	Edinburgh
15:00 GMT				Stadium: Easter Road; Attendance: 14,991

30 October 1993 Premier League	Rangers	1–2	Celtic	Glasgow
15:00 GMT				Stadium: Ibrox Stadium; Attendance: 47,522

6 November 1993 Premier League	Celtic	3–0	Partick Thistle	Glasgow
15:00 GMT				Stadium: Celtic Park; Attendance: 21,642

9 November 1993 Premier League	Aberdeen	1–1	Celtic	Aberdeen
19:45 GMT				Stadium: Pittodrie Stadium; Attendance: 19,474

13 November 1993 Premier League	Kilmarnock	2–2	Celtic	Kilmarnock
15:00 GMT				Stadium: Rugby Park; Attendance: 16,449

20 November 1993 Premier League	Celtic	0–0	Hearts	Glasgow
15:00 GMT				Stadium: Celtic Park; Attendance: 25,990

24 November 1993 Premier League	Celtic	2–0	Motherwell	Glasgow
19:45 GMT				Stadium: Celtic Park; Attendance: 16,654

27 November 1993 Premier League	Celtic	2–0	Raith Rovers	Glasgow
15:00 GMT				Stadium: Celtic Park; Attendance: 17,453

30 November 1993 Premier League	Dundee United	1-0	Celtic	Dundee
19:45 GMT				Stadium: Tannadice; Attendance: 10,108

4 December 1993 Premier League	Celtic	1–0	St Johnstone	Glasgow
15:00 GMT				Stadium: Celtic Park; Attendance: 15,941

11 December 1993 Premier League	Dundee	1–1	Celtic	Dundee
15:00 GMT				Stadium: Dens Park; Attendance: 8,730

18 December 1993 Premier League	Celtic	1–0	Hibernian	Glasgow
15:00 GMT				Stadium: Celtic Park; Attendance: 16,808

1 January 1994 Premier League	Celtic	2–4	Rangers	Glasgow
15:00 GMT				Stadium: Celtic Park; Attendance: 48,506

8 January 1994 Premier League	Partick Thistle	1–0	Celtic	Glasgow
15:00 GMT				Stadium: Firhill Park; Attendance: 12,887

11 January 1994 Premier League	Motherwell	2–1	Celtic	Motherwell
19:45 GMT				Stadium: Fir Park; Attendance: 13,159

19 January 1994 Premier League	Celtic	2–2	Aberdeen	Glasgow
19:45 GMT				Stadium: Celtic Park; Attendance: 19,083

22 January 1994 Premier League	Celtic	0–0	Dundee United	Glasgow
15:00 GMT				Stadium: Celtic Park; Attendance: 17,235

5 February 1994 Premier League	Raith Rovers	0–0	Celtic	Kirkcaldy
15:00 GMT				Stadium: Stark's Park; Attendance: 7,678

12 February 1994 Premier League	Hearts	0–2	Celtic	Edinburgh
15:00 GMT				Stadium: Tynecastle Park; Attendance: 14,049

1 March 1994 Premier League	Celtic	1–0	Kilmarnock	Glasgow
19:45 GMT				Stadium: Celtic Park; Attendance: 9,887

5 March 1994 Premier League	St Johnstone	0–1	Celtic	Perth
15:00 GMT				Stadium: McDiarmid Park; Attendance: 8,622

19 March 1994 Premier League	Hibernian	0–0	Celtic	Edinburgh
15:00 GMT				Stadium: Easter Road; Attendance: 14,639

26 March 1994 Premier League	Celtic	0–1	Motherwell	Glasgow
15:00 GMT				Stadium: Celtic Park; Attendance: 36,199

30 March 1994 Premier League	Celtic	2–1	Raith Rovers	Glasgow
19:45 GMT				Stadium: Celtic Park; Attendance: 14,140

2 April 1994 Premier League	Dundee United	1–3	Celtic	Dundee
15:00 GMT				Stadium: Tannadice Park; Attendance: 9,790

6 April 1994 Premier League	Celtic	1–1	Dundee	Glasgow
19:45 GMT				Stadium: Celtic Park; Attendance: 16,585

9 April 1994 Premier League	Celtic	2–2	Hearts	Glasgow
15:00 GMT				Stadium: Celtic Park; Attendance: 18,761

16 April 1994 Premier League	Kilmarnock	2–0	Celtic	Kilmarnock
15:00 GMT				Stadium: Rugby Park; Attendance: 11,576

23 April 1994 Premier League	Dundee	0–2	Celtic	Dundee
15:00 GMT				Stadium: Dens Park; Attendance: 5,795

27 April 1994 Premier League	Celtic	1–1	St Johnstone	Glasgow
19:45 GMT				Stadium: Celtic Park; Attendance: 10,602

30 April 1994 Premier League	Rangers	1–1	Celtic	Glasgow
15:00 GMT				Stadium: Ibrox Stadium; Attendance: 47,013

7 May 1994 Premier League	Celtic	1–1	Partick Thistle	Glasgow
15:00 GMT				Stadium: Celtic Park; Attendance: 16,827

14 May 1994 Premier League	Aberdeen	1–1	Celtic	Aberdeen
15:00 GMT				Stadium: Pittodrie Stadium; Attendance: 16,500

=== Scottish Cup ===
29 January 1994 Third round	Motherwell	1–0	Celtic	Motherwell
15:00 GMT				Stadium: Fir Park; Attendance: 14,061

=== Scottish League Cup ===
10 August 1993 Second round	Stirling Albion	0–2	Celtic	Stirling
20:00 GMT				Stadium: Forthbank Stadium; Attendance: 8,533

25 August 1993 Third round	Arbroath	1–9	Celtic	Arbroath
20:00 GMT				Stadium: Gayfield Park; Attendance: 5,659

31 August 1993 Quarter Finals	Celtic	1–0	Airdrieonians	Glasgow
20:00 GMT				Stadium: Celtic Park; Attendance: 25,738

22 September 1993 Semi-final	Rangers	1–0	Celtic	Glasgow
20:00 GMT	O'Neil 99'			Stadium: Ibrox Stadium; Attendance: 47,420; Referee: Dougie Hope

=== UEFA Cup ===
14 September 1993 1st round 1st leg	BSC Young Boys (Switzerland)	0–0	(Scotland) Celtic	Bern
20:00 GMT	O'Neil 99'			Stadium: Wankdorf Stadium; Attendance: 7,300

29 September 1993 1st round 2nd leg	Celtic (Scotland)	1–0 (1–1 agg.)	(Switzerland) BSC Young Boys	Glasgow
20:00 GMT	O'Neil 99'			Stadium: Celtic Park; Attendance: 18,876

20 October 1993 2nd round 1st leg	Celtic (Scotland)	1–0	(Portugal) Sporting CP	Glasgow
20:00 GMT	Creaney 8'			Stadium: Celtic Park; Attendance: 31,321

3 November 1993 2nd round 2nd leg	Sporting CP (Portugal)	2–0 (2–1 agg.)	(Scotland) Celtic	Lisbon
20:00 GMT	O'Neil 99'			Stadium: Estádio José Alvalade; Attendance: 52,000

== Club Staff ==
Board of Directors
Position	Name
Chairman	Kevin Kelly
Vice-chairman	David Smith
Secretary	Chris White
Directors	James Farrell Tom Grant Michael Kelly Jack McGinn Chris White

Football Management
Position	Name
Manager	Liam Brady Frank Connor Lou Macari
Assistant Manager	Joe Jordan Chic Bates
First Team Coaches	Ashley Grimes Peter Henderson
Coach	Frank Connor
Reserve Team Manager	Tom McAdam
Youth Development Manager	Tommy Craig
Physio	Brian Scott
Masseur	Jimmy Steele
Kitman	Neil Mochan
