= 1993–94 St Johnstone F.C. season =

St Johnstone
1993–94 season
- Manager: Paul Sturrock
- Stadium: McDiarmid Park
- Scottish Premier Division: 10th (relegated)
- Scottish Cup: Quarter-final
- Scottish League Cup: Third round
- Highest home attendance: 10,152 vs Rangers, Premier Division, 14 August 1993
- Lowest home attendance: 3,406 vs Airdrieonians, League Cup, 25 August 1993
- Average home league attendance: 5,877

During the 1993–94 season, St Johnstone competed in the Scottish Premier Division, in which they finished 10th and were relegated to the 1994–95 Scottish First Division.

== Scottish Premier Division ==
=== League table ===
Pos	Team	Pld	W	D	L	GF	GA	GD	Pts	Qualification or relegation
8	Kilmarnock	44	12	16	16	36	45	−9	40	
9	Partick Thistle	44	12	16	16	46	57	−11	40	
10	St Johnstone (R)	44	10	20	14	35	47	−12	40	Relegation to the 1994–95 Scottish First Division
11	Raith Rovers (R)	44	6	19	19	46	80	−34	31	Relegation to the 1994–95 Scottish First Division
12	Dundee (R)	44	8	13	23	42	57	−15	29	Relegation to the 1994–95 Scottish First Division

Source: RSSSF
Rules for classification: 1) points; 2) goal difference; 3) number of goals scored.
(R) Relegated

=== Matches ===
Win	Draw	Loss

Scottish Premier Division results
Date	Opponent	Venue	Result F–A	Scorers	Attendance
7 August 1993	Raith Rovers	A	1–1	Wright	4,628
14 August 1993	Rangers	H	1–2	Wright	10,152
21 August 1993	Dundee United	H	1–1	Torfason	6,248
28 August 1993	Aberdeen	A	0–0		11,682
4 September 1993	Motherwell	H	3–0	Wright (2, 1 pen.), Curran	4,576
11 September 1993	Kilmarnock	A	0–0		5,670
18 September 1993	Hibernian	H	1–3	Wright	5,008
25 September 1993	Dundee	H	2–1	Curran, Davies	4,203
2 October 1993	Partick Thistle	A	1–4	Davies	3,402
6 October 1993	Celtic	H	2–1	Davies (2)	7,386
9 October 1993	Heart of Midlothian	A	1–1	Wright (pen.)	6,028
16 October 1993	Rangers	A	0–2		41,960
23 October 1993	Raith Rovers	H	1–1	Torfason	4,411
30 October 1993	Dundee United	A	0–2		6,275
6 November 1993	Aberdeen	H	1–1	McGinnis	5,757
9 November 1993	Motherwell	A	0–1		4,527
13 November 1993	Partick Thistle	H	1–3	Curran	3,548
20 November 1993	Dundee	A	1–0	Moore	4,714
27 November 1993	Kilmarnock	H	0–1		4,576
30 November 1993	Hibernian	A	0–0		4,996
4 December 1993	Celtic	A	0–1		15,941
11 December 1993	Heart of Midlothian	H	2–0	Scott, Davies	4,631
18 December 1993	Rangers	H	0–4		10,056
8 January 1994	Aberdeen	A	1–1	Ferguson	12,712
18 January 1994	Raith Rovers	A	1–1	Torfason (pen.)	3,693
22 January 1994	Hibernian	H	2–2	Wright, Dodds	6,466
25 January 1994	Dundee United	H	1–1	Torfason	5,758
5 February 1994	Kilmarnock	A	0–0		6,345
8 February 1994	Motherwell	H	2–1	Dodds, Ferguson	4,522
12 February 1994	Dundee	H	1–1	Dodds	5,517
5 March 1994	Celtic	H	0–1		8,622
19 March 1994	Rangers	A	0–4		43,228
22 March 1994	Partick Thistle	A	0–0		3,295
26 March 1994	Raith Rovers	H	2–0	Dodds (2)	4,550
30 March 1994	Kilmarnock	H	0–1		5,513
2 April 1994	Hibernian	A	0–0		6,628
6 April 1994	Heart of Midlothian	A	2–2	Ferguson, Scott	8,938
9 April 1994	Dundee	A	1–0	Torfason	2,871
16 April 1994	Partick Thistle	H	1–0	Scott	4,933
23 April 1994	Heart of Midlothian	H	0–0		6,762
27 April 1994	Celtic	A	1–1	Dodds (pen.)	10,602
30 April 1994	Dundee United	A	0–0		10,635
7 May 1994	Aberdeen	H	0–1		6,107
14 May 1994	Motherwell	A	1–0	Inglis	7,498

== Scottish Cup ==
Win	Draw	Loss

Scottish Cup results
Round	Date	Opponent	Venue	Result F–A	Scorers	Attendance
Third round	29 January 1994	Hamilton Academical	H	2–0	Dodds, McMartin	4,331
Fourth round	28 February 1994	Stirling Albion	H	3–3	Dodds (2), Ferguson	3,759
Fourth round replay	2 March 1994	Stirling Albion	A	2–0	Scott, Ferguson	2,452
Quarter-final	12 March 1994	Aberdeen	H	1–1	Dodds	8,447
Quarter-final replay	15 March 1994	Aberdeen	A	0–2		14,325

== Scottish League Cup ==
Win	Draw	Loss

Scottish League Cup results
Round	Date	Opponent	Venue	Result F–A	Scorers	Attendance
Second round	11 August 1993	Clyde	A	2–1	Wright (pen.), Moore	1,109
Third round	25 August 1993	Airdrieonians	H	0–2		3,406
