= 1994 Scottish Cup final =

- Event: 1993–94 Scottish Cup
| Dundee United | Rangers |
| 1 | 0 |
- Date: 21 May 1994
- Venue: Hampden Park, Glasgow
- Man of the Match: Gordan Petrić
- Referee: Douglas Hope
- Attendance: 37,450

The 1994 Scottish Cup final was the final match of the 1993–94 Scottish Cup competition, the 109th edition of the most important cup competition in Scottish football. It was played between Dundee United and Rangers at Hampden Park, Glasgow, on 21 May 1994.

Dundee United won the game 1–0, with a goal by Craig Brewster. Following a mix-up between Rangers' goalkeeper Ally Maxwell and Dave McPherson, United's Christian Dailly rolled a cross-shot across goal. The ball bounced off the post but Brewster was there to tap in.

It was Dundee United's first Scottish Cup victory, having previously played in six finals, but losing all of them. Dundee United manager Ivan Golac was the first manager from outside the United Kingdom to win the Scottish Cup.

== Background ==
Rangers were seeking to complete what was described as "a Double Treble" having claimed all three domestic trophies in 1992–93, followed by the League Cup and the Premier Division in 1993–94. United on the other hand had failed to win the Scottish Cup despite reaching six finals, four of those within the previous ten years. Moreover the side had only finished two points clear of being relegated from the Premier Division. Consequently Rangers were heavy favourites for the match, although as Dundee United player Craig Brewster later recalled, United had beaten Rangers 3–0 at Ibrox a few months earlier.

== Match ==
=== Summary ===
Both sides fielded attacking line-ups and had scoring opportunities in the first half, and Dundee United had a penalty claim turned down in the 11th minute, but the match remained goalless at halftime. The only goal of the game eventually came two minutes into the second half. Rangers' goalkeeper Ally Maxwell saw his attempt at a clearance come off Dundee United's Christian Dailly who was then able to shoot towards the goal. His shot hit the post, but his team mate Craig Brewster was on hand to score. Rangers strove for an equalizer, their closest effort being an Alexei Mikhailichenko shot that was superbly saved by United's Guido van de Kamp, but they were ultimately unable to break down Dundee United's defence.

=== Details ===
21 May 1994
15:00 BST

| Dundee United | 1–0 | Rangers |
|---|---|---|
| Brewster 47' | Report |

Hampden Park, Glasgow
Attendance: 37,450
Referee: Douglas Hope (Erskine)

=== Teams ===
DUNDEE UNITED:
| GK | 1 | (Netherlands) Guido van de Kamp |
| DF | 3 | (Scotland) Maurice Malpas (c) |
| DF | 5 | (Federal Republic of Yugoslavia) Gordan Petrić |
| DF | 6 | (Scotland) Brian Welsh |
| RM | 4 | (Scotland) Jim McInally |
| MF | 7 | (Scotland) Dave Bowman |
| MF | 8 | (Scotland) David Hannah |
| LM | 2 | (Scotland) Alex Cleland |
| RW | 11 | (Scotland) Christian Dailly |
| CF | 10 | (Scotland) Craig Brewster |
| LW | 9 | (Scotland) Andy McLaren | (substituted off) 83' |
Substitutes:
| FW | 12 | (Trinidad and Tobago) Jerren Nixon | (substituted on) 83' |
| DF | 14 | (Scotland) Gary Bollan |
Manager:
(Federal Republic of Yugoslavia) Ivan Golac

RANGERS:
| GK | 1 | (Scotland) Ally Maxwell |
| DF | 2 | (England) Gary Stevens | (substituted off) 23' |
| DF | 4 | (Scotland) Richard Gough (c) |
| DF | 5 | (Scotland) Dave McPherson |
| DF | 3 | (Scotland) David Robertson |
| MF | 7 | (Scotland) Neil Murray |
| MF | 8 | (Scotland) Ian Ferguson |
| MF | 6 | (Scotland) Stuart McCall |
| FW | 11 | (Scotland) Gordon Durie |
| FW | 10 | (England) Mark Hateley |
| FW | 9 | (Scotland) Ally McCoist | (substituted off) 75' |
Substitutes:
| MF | 12 | (Ukraine) Alexei Mikhailichenko | (substituted on) 23' |
| FW | 14 | (Scotland) Duncan Ferguson | (substituted on) 75' |
Manager:
(Scotland) Walter Smith

== Attendance ==
At the time of the match Hampden Park was undergoing major reconstruction work. As this was only partly completed its capacity was reduced. Consequently, only 38,000 tickets for the final were available (with Rangers being given 19,000 and Dundee United being allocated 12,000 and the rest going to sponsors and other clubs). The match was a sell-out, and ultimately 37,450 people attended the final. Authors Mike Watson and Matthew Watson suggested that the bulk of the apparent 550 non-attenders were probably drawn from tickets issued to sponsors.
