= Craig McCall =

Scottish footballer

Personal information
- Full name: Craig Stuart Andrew McCall
- Date of birth: 19 July 1996 (age 30)
- Place of birth: Glasgow, Scotland
- Position: Midfielder

Youth career
- –2012: Bradford City
- 2012–2015: Motherwell

College career
Years	Team	Apps	(Gls)
2015–2016	EFSC Titans	36	(7)
2018–2019	Florida Tech Panthers	31	(1)

Senior career*
Years	Team	Apps	(Gls)
2017	Edusport Academy	4	(0)
2017–2018	Knaresborough Town	7	(0)
2017–2018	Knaresborough Town Reserves	8	(3)
2019	South Georgia Tormenta FC 2	11	(2)
2021	South Georgia Tormenta	9	(0)
- * Club domestic league appearances and goals as of 24 April 2021

Craig Stuart Andrew McCall (born 19 July 1996) is a Scottish footballer who last played as a midfielder for South Georgia Tormenta in the USL League One.

== Career ==
=== Youth, college and amateur ===
McCall played with the academy sides at Bradford City and Motherwell.

After being released by Motherwell, McCall moved to the United States to play college soccer at Eastern Florida State College, where he made 36 appearances, scoring 7 goals and tallying 13 assists over two seasons.

In 2017 and early 2018, McCall returned to United Kingdom to play with lower league sides Edusport Academy in the Lowland Football League and English Northern Counties East Football League Premier Division Knaresborough Town and their reserve side.

McCall went back to the United States in 2018 to play two further seasons of college soccer at Florida Institute of Technology, making 31 appearances, scoring a single goal and creating 10 assists for the Panthers.

Following college, McCall spent a season in the USL League Two with South Georgia Tormenta FC 2.

=== Professional ===
On 9 December 2020, McCall signed his first professional contract with USL League One side South Georgia Tormenta ahead of their 2021 season. He made his professional debut on 24 April 2021, appearing as a 78th-minute substitute during a 2–0 loss to Union Omaha.

== Personal life ==
Craig is the son of former Everton, Rangers, Bradford City, Sheffield United and Scotland international Stuart McCall; his grandfather Andy McCall was also a professional footballer.
