= Andy McCall (footballer, born 1925) =

Scottish footballer

Personal information
- Full name: Andrew McCall
- Date of birth: 15 March 1925
- Place of birth: Hamilton, Scotland
- Date of death: December 2014 (aged 89)
- Place of death: Leeds, England
- Position: Winger

Senior career*
Years	Team	Apps	(Gls)
- Bent Royal Oak PSA
- Blantyre Celtic
1947–1951	Blackpool	87	(15)
1951–1952	West Bromwich Albion	31	(3)
1952–1955	Leeds United	62	(8)
1955–1956	Lovell's Athletic		
1956–1960	Halifax Town	139	(15)
Total		319	(41)
- * Club domestic league appearances and goals

Andrew McCall (15 March 1925 – December 2014) was a Scottish professional footballer who played as a winger, making over 300 appearances in the Football League.

== Early and personal life ==
Born in Hamilton, Lanarkshire, McCall joined the Royal Navy at the age of seventeen. He later served with the King's Own Scottish Borderers before starting his football career at Junior level with Bent Royal Oak PSA and Blantyre Celtic.

His son, Stuart, is a former international footballer who later became a manager. McCall suffered burns to around 25% of his body in the 1985 Bradford City stadium fire. He was watching his son play.

Stuart's son Craig was also a footballer.

== Career ==
McCall moved to England to sign with Blackpool in 1947, making 87 league appearances over the next four years. On a low wage, he supplemented his income by working at Blackpool Pleasure Beach during the summers. In 2021, exactly seventy years after McCall left Blackpool, his son, Stuart, joined the club as assistant to head coach Neil Critchley.

McCall signed for West Bromwich Albion in 1951, and in his sole season at the club made 31 league appearances. He then signed for Leeds United in 1952, and in three years made 62 league appearances. He later played with Welsh side Lovell's Athletic, before returning to English football with Halifax Town, for whom he made 139 league appearances.
