= Brian Clark (Scottish footballer) =

Scottish footballer

Personal information
- Full name: Brian Clark
- Date of birth: 1 March 1988 (age 38)
- Place of birth: Dundee, Scotland
- Height: 5 ft 11 in (1.80 m)
- Position: Midfielder

Senior career*
Years	Team	Apps	(Gls)
2006–2008	Dundee	8	(1)
2007	→ Arbroath (loan)	6	(0)
2008–	Carnoustie Panmure	0	(0)
- * Club domestic league appearances and goals as of 09:09, 29 December 2008 (UTC)

Brian Clark (born 1 March 1988 in Dundee) is a Scottish footballer, or soccer-player, who plays as a midfielder.

He started his career with Dundee, but was released in 2008, after making less than 10 league appearances, and scoring one goal. He was loaned out to Arbroath in the first part of the 2007–08 season. After his release by Dundee, Clark appeared for Montrose as a trialist in a friendly match during July 2008 against Dundee. Clark eventually signed for junior side Carnoustie Panmure.
