= Brian Welsh (footballer) =

Scottish footballer and coach

Personal information
- Date of birth: 23 February 1969 (age 57)
- Place of birth: Edinburgh, Scotland
- Position: Defender

Team information
- Current team: Northern Virginia United (head coach)

Youth career
- Tynecastle BC

Senior career*
Years	Team	Apps	(Gls)
1985–1996	Dundee United	140	(10)
1996–1999	Hibernian	32	(1)
2000	Stenhousemuir	8	(1)
2000	Clydebank	7	(1)
2000–2002	Cowdenbeath	4	(0)
Total		191	(13)

International career
1986–1987	Scotland under-19		

Managerial career
- 2006–2008: Cowdenbeath
- 2012: Livingston (caretaker)
- 2018–: Northern Virginia United
- * Club domestic league appearances and goals

Brian Welsh (born 23 February 1969) is a Scottish football coach and former player, who is currently owner and head coach of American club Northern Virginia United. He began his playing career with Dundee United, where he made 140 league appearances and was part of the team that won the 1994 Scottish Cup final. He joined Hibernian in 1996, where he spent three years, before ending his career with brief spells at Stenhousemuir, Clydebank and Cowdenbeath. He also represented the Scotland under-19 team.

Welsh returned to Cowdenbeath as manager from 2006 to 2008 and later became Head of Youth Development at Livingston, where he was also briefly caretaker manager, before emigrating to the United States.

== Playing career ==
Welsh began his career with Dundee United, making his debut in the 1986–87 season. During that season, Welsh was part of the Scotland under-19 team who reached the semi-finals of the UEFA European Under-19 Championship, losing 1–0 to Italy. The following year, he reached the quarter-finals of the World Youth Championship, losing on penalties to West Germany. Welsh became a regular in the United side in 1993–94 and helped the club win the Scottish Cup for the first time, particularly by scoring in the semi-final against Aberdeen. He then experienced relegation in 1995 and subsequent promotion with the club. Welsh scored a crucial goal in a promotion play-off match against Partick Thistle in 1996.

In August 1996 Welsh left Dundee United to join Hibernian for a £200,000 transfer fee. Leaving Hibernian after three years, Welsh subsequently had spells with Stenhousemuir, Clydebank and finally Cowdenbeath, before retiring in 2002.

Welsh began legal proceedings against Malcolm Morrison, who was employed as Hibernian club doctor during his time with the club, in 2008. He claimed that an injection administered by Morrison had ruined his career, and an out-of-court settlement for a "substantial sum" was reached.

== Coaching career ==
After his playing retirement he helped coach the Cowdenbeath squad before being appointed team manager in October 2006, succeeding Mixu Paatelainen. Welsh was sacked by Cowdenbeath in June 2008, following their relegation to the Third Division. In 2009, Welsh won a compensation claim against Cowdenbeath for his dismissal as manager. The club stated that they had dismissed Welsh because he had incurred touchline bans due to misbehaviour during matches, but the judge ruled in his favour because the club had taken no action at the time and had dismissed him for unconnected reasons.

Welsh was appointed head of youth development by Livingston in July 2009.

He subsequently moved to the United States, where he became Technical Director for Braddock Road Elite Travel Soccer of the Braddock Road Youth Club in Fairfax, Virginia. Currently, he has been appointed as the head coach for Northern Virginia United since January 2018.

== Career statistics ==
Club	Season	League		Cup		Lg Cup		Other		Total	
Club	Season	Apps	Goals	Apps	Goals	Apps	Goals	Apps	Goals	Apps	Goals
Dundee United	1986–87	1	0	0	0	0	0	0	0	1	0
Dundee United	1987–88	1	1	0	0	0	0	0	0	1	1
Dundee United	1988–89	1	0	0	0	0	0	0	0	1	0
Dundee United	1989–90	5	0	0	0	0	0	0	0	5	0
Dundee United	1990–91	17	0	2	0	4	1	3	0	26	1
Dundee United	1991–92	11	1	0	0	0	0	0	0	11	1
Dundee United	1992–93	15	1	1	1	1	0	0	0	17	2
Dundee United	1993–94	36	1	7	2	4	0	2	0	49	3
Dundee United	1994–95	28	4	3	0	2	0	2	0	35	4
Dundee United	1995–96	25	2	1	0	2	0	0	0	0	0
Dundee United	Total	140	10	14	3	13	1	7	0	174	14
Hibernian	1995–96	1	0	0	0	0	0	0	0	1	0
Hibernian	1996–97	15	0	0	0	1	0	0	0	16	0
Hibernian	1997–98	17	1	0	0	0	0	0	0	17	1
Hibernian	Total	32	1	0	0	1	0	0	0	33	1
Stenhousemuir	1999–00	8	1	0	0	0	0	0	0	8	1
Stenhousemuir	Total	8	1	0	0	0	0	0	0	8	1
Clydebank	2000–01	7	1	0	0	0	0	1	0	8	1
Clydebank	Total	7	1	0	0	0	0	1	0	8	1
Cowdenbeath	2000–01	2	0	0	0	0	0	0	0	2	0
Cowdenbeath	2001–02	2	0	0	0	0	0	0	0	2	0
Cowdenbeath	Total	4	0	0	0	0	0	0	0	4	0
Career total		191	13	14	3	14	1	8	0	227	17

== Honours ==
Dundee United

- Scottish Cup

1993–94
