= Brian Flies =

Danish footballer (born 1969)

Personal information
- Full name: Brian Flies
- Date of birth: 29 August 1969 (age 57)
- Place of birth: Næstved, Denmark
- Height: 1.84 m (6 ft 0 in)
- Position: Goalkeeper

Team information
- Current team: HB Køge (goalkeeper coach)

Senior career*
Years	Team	Apps	(Gls)
1991–1993	Næstved IF		
1993–1995	FC Copenhagen	20	(0)
1994	→ Dundee United (loan)	1	(0)
1995	Lyngby BK		
1996	BK Avarta		
1996–2001	AB		
2001–2003	Ølstykke FC		
2003–2005	Slagelse B&I		

International career
1992	Denmark u-21	0	(0)

Managerial career
- 2003–2005: Slagelse B&I (playing assistant)
- –2009: Næstved BK (goalkeeper coach)
- 2009–2010: Næstved BK (assistant)
- 2010–2011: Næstved BK
- 2015–: HB Køge (goalkeeper coach)
- * Club domestic league appearances and goals

Brian Flies (born 29 August 1969) is a Danish retired footballer, who played as a goalkeeper. Flies was a member of the Denmark U21 national team at the 1992 Olympic tournament, though he did not play any games. He became manager of Næstved BK in the summer of 2010. He resigned on 30 September 2011.
