= Douglas Hope =

Scottish football referee

- Full name: Douglas Davidson Hope
- Born: 6 March 1944 (age 82); Erskine, Scotland
- Height: 1.83 m (6 ft 0 in)
- Other occupation: Company Director

Douglas Davidson Hope (born 6 April 1944 in Erskine, Renfrewshire) is a Scottish former association football referee who refereed over 1,000 matches, the last being the Scottish Cup Final of 1994.

He was joint vice-chairman, with Roger Jeffrey Hipkiss, of Wolverhampton Wanderers F. C. from 1982 to 1986.

His brother Kenny Hope refereed the 1987 Scottish Cup Final.
