= Billy McKinlay =

Scottish footballer (born 1969)

Personal information
- Full name: William James Alexander McKinlay
- Date of birth: 22 April 1969 (age 57)
- Place of birth: Glasgow, Scotland
- Height: 5 ft 8 in (1.73 m)
- Position: Midfielder

Team information
- Current team: Everton (assistant)

Youth career
- 1984–1985: Hamilton Thistle
- 1985–1986: Dundee United

Senior career*
Years	Team	Apps	(Gls)
1986–1995	Dundee United	222	(23)
1995–2000	Blackburn Rovers	91	(3)
2000	→ Leicester City (loan)	0	(0)
2000–2001	Bradford City	11	(0)
2001	Preston North End	0	(0)
2001–2002	Clydebank	8	(0)
2002–2004	Leicester City	53	(1)
2004–2005	Fulham	2	(0)
Total		387	(27)

International career
1988–1989	Scotland U21	6	(1)
1990–1994	Scotland B	2	(0)
1990	Scottish League XI	1	(0)
1993–1998	Scotland	29	(4)

Managerial career
- 2014: Watford
- 2015–2016: Stabæk
- 2017: Sunderland (caretaker)
- * Club domestic league appearances and goals

William James Alexander McKinlay (born 22 April 1969) is a Scottish football manager and former professional footballer who is currently assistant manager of Everton.

As a player, he was a midfielder who notably played in the Premier League for Blackburn Rovers, Leicester City, Bradford City and Fulham. He also played in the Scottish Premiership and Scottish Football League for Dundee United, the Football League for Preston North End and the Scottish Football League for Clydebank. McKinlay appeared 29 times for Scotland and played at Euro 1996 and the 1998 World Cup.

As a coach, he has worked for Fulham, the Northern Ireland national team and Watford. He was appointed Watford head coach in September 2014 but left the post after eight days. After a spell as assistant head coach with Real Sociedad in Spain, he joined Norwegian club Stabæk in November 2015, before being sacked in July 2016. He has since worked at Sunderland, Stoke City and West Ham United.

In January 2025, McKinlay joined Everton as assistant head coach, working alongside head coach David Moyes.

== Club career ==
A product of Dundee United's scouting and coaching network in the west of Scotland, Glasgow-born McKinlay was signed from Hamilton Thistle in 1986. He played in the 1988 Scottish Cup final side at the age of 19, after only twelve Scottish Football League appearances. He went on to play over two hundred matches for United, but missed out on the club's 1994 Scottish Cup win due to suspension. He was named in the SPFA Team of the Year for 1994.

Following Dundee United's relegation in 1995, McKinlay requested a transfer. He was sold to English Premier League champions Blackburn Rovers in October 1995 for a fee of £1.75 million. After leaving Blackburn in 2000, McKinlay had brief spells with Bradford City, Preston North End and Clydebank. In 2002, he joined Leicester City, scoring his only goal for them against Coventry City. In 2004, Fulham manager Chris Coleman signed McKinlay, primarily to assist the reserve squad.

== International career ==
McKinlay represented Scotland at under-21 and B international level before making his full debut in 1993. He made 14 appearances for Scotland while with Dundee United, the last two as a First Division player. He is one of only three players from that division to play at full international level for Scotland since 1975. In total he played 29 times for Scotland between 1993 and 1998, scoring four goals. He was selected for the Euro 1996 and 1998 World Cup squads, making one appearance at each tournament.

== Coaching career ==
=== Fulham ===
On 21 December 2007, Fulham first-team coach Ray Lewington and reserve team manager McKinlay took over after manager Lawrie Sanchez was sacked. Roy Hodgson was appointed nine days later. McKinlay coached Fulham's reserve side and developed youth talent, and in 2012 became Northern Ireland assistant manager, but returned to Fulham to manage the side's 4–0 defeat at Everton, on 28 April 2012 due to Martin Jol's chest infection and was again in charge on Merseyside, for Fulham's win against Liverpool. On 2 December 2013, McKinlay left Fulham after Martin Jol's departure a day earlier.

=== Watford ===
McKinlay was appointed as Watford first-team coach, under head coach Óscar García, on 26 September 2014. McKinlay replaced Garcia a few days later as head coach, after the Spaniard resigned due to suffering from ill health. McKinlay relinquished his role as Northern Ireland's assistant manager after becoming the Watford manager. After just eight days in the job, McKinlay was replaced as Watford head coach by Slaviša Jokanović. McKinlay had taken charge of two matches, a win against Brentford and a draw with Brighton.

=== Real Sociedad ===
On 27 November 2014, McKinlay joined Spanish club Real Sociedad as an assistant coach, working alongside David Moyes. He was sacked, along with Moyes, on 9 November 2015.

=== Stabæk ===
On 30 November 2015, McKinlay was appointed as manager of Norwegian Tippeligaen side Stabæk Fotball on a two-year contract. McKinlay resigned as manager on 8 July 2016, after being knocked out of the Europa League by Connah's Quay Nomads.

=== Sunderland ===
McKinlay joined Sunderland as a scout, initially under Moyes, in 2016. In October 2017 he was promoted to a temporary first team coaching role by manager Simon Grayson when assistant manager Glynn Snodin became ill. Following Grayson's sacking, McKinlay and Robbie Stockdale were appointed the club's joint caretaker managers in November 2017. After one game in charge, a 1–0 loss against Middlesbrough on 5 November 2017,

=== West Ham United ===
McKinlay left Sunderland to take a coaching position at West Ham United. He left the east London club at the end of the 2017–18 season, after manager David Moyes' contract was not renewed.

=== Stoke City ===
McKinlay joined Stoke City on 21 November 2019, as assistant manager to Michael O'Neill. McKinlay left Stoke by Mutual consent on 12 April 2021.

=== Return to West Ham United ===
In July 2021, McKinlay rejoined West Ham United as part of David Moyes' coaching staff. Upon the departure of club manager, David Moyes in May 2024, McKinlay left the club with other coaches and back-room staff.

== Career statistics ==
Appearances and goals by national team and year
National team	Year	Apps	Goals
Scotland	1993	1	1
Scotland	1994	6	2
Scotland	1995	8	1
Scotland	1996	4	0
Scotland	1997	3	0
Scotland	1998	7	0
Total		29	4

Scores and results list Scotland's goal tally first, score column indicates score after each McKinlay goal.

List of international goals scored by Billy McKinlay
No.	Date	Venue	Opponent	Score	Result	Competition
1	17 November 1993	National Stadium, Ta' Qali, Malta	Malta	1–0	2–0	1994 FIFA World Cup qualification
2	20 April 1994	Ernst-Happel-Stadion, Vienna, Austria	Austria	2–1	2–1	Friendly
3	12 October 1994	Hampden Park, Glasgow, Scotland	Faroe Islands	4–0	5–1	UEFA Euro 1996 qualification
4	7 June 1995	Svangaskarð, Toftir, Faroes	Faroe Islands	1–0	2–0	UEFA Euro 1996 qualification

== Managerial statistics ==
As of match played 5 November 2017

Team	From	To	Record				
Team	From	To	G	W	D	L	Win %
Watford	29 September 2014	7 October 2014	2	1	1	0	50.00
Stabæk	30 November 2015	8 July 2016	20	6	2	12	30.00
Sunderland (joint caretaker)	1 November 2017	12 November 2017	1	0	0	1	0.00
Total			23	7	3	13	30.43
