= 1993–94 in Scottish football =

Premier Division champions
- Rangers

Division One champions
- Falkirk

Division Two champions
- Stranraer

Scottish Cup winners
- Dundee United

League Cup winners
- Rangers

Challenge Cup winners
- Falkirk

Junior Cup winners
- Largs Thistle

Teams in Europe
- Aberdeen, Celtic, Dundee United, Heart of Midlothian, Rangers

Scotland national team
- 1994 World Cup qualification
- ← 1992–93 1994–95 →

The 1993–94 season was the 97th season of competitive football in Scotland. This season saw several teams relegated from the 1st and 2nd divisions in preparation for the introduction of a 3rd division the following season.

== Notable events ==
- The resignation of Scotland national football team manager Andy Roxburgh after seven years in charge, following their failure to qualify for the 1994 FIFA World Cup, and the appointment of Craig Brown as his successor.
- The dismissal of Liam Brady as Celtic manager in October after just over two years at the helm, and the appointment of Lou Macari as his successor.
- Macari's dismissal as Celtic manager in June, after the end of the season, after just eight months in charge. He was succeeded by Kilmarnock's Tommy Burns.
- Rangers paying a British record fee of £4million for Dundee United striker Duncan Ferguson before the start of the season.
- Dundee United's shock 1–0 win over Rangers in the Scottish Cup final, which deprived Rangers of a second successive domestic treble.
- Rangers signed Tottenham Hotspur striker Gordon Durie for £1.2million in November.
- Rangers retained the Premier Division title (their sixth in succession) and the League Cup.
- Further league reconstruction would be introduced for the 1994–1995 season resulting in four leagues of ten teams. This meant that there would be a new Scottish Third Division, so this season five teams were relegated from the first division and only one promoted (Stranraer) to the first division. The bottom eight teams of the old second division were 'relegated' to the new third division.

== Scottish Premier Division ==
| Pos | Team | Pld | W | D | L | GF | GA | GD | Pts | Qualification or relegation |
|---|---|---|---|---|---|---|---|---|---|---|
| 1 | Rangers (C) | 44 | 22 | 14 | 8 | 74 | 41 | +33 | 58 | Qualification for the Champions League qualifying round |
| 2 | Aberdeen | 44 | 17 | 21 | 6 | 58 | 36 | +22 | 55 | Qualification for the UEFA Cup preliminary round |
| 3 | Motherwell | 44 | 20 | 14 | 10 | 58 | 43 | +15 | 54 | Qualification for the UEFA Cup preliminary round |
| 4 | Celtic | 44 | 15 | 20 | 9 | 51 | 38 | +13 | 50 | |
| 5 | Hibernian | 44 | 16 | 15 | 13 | 53 | 48 | +5 | 47 | |
| 6 | Dundee United | 44 | 11 | 20 | 13 | 47 | 48 | −1 | 42 | Qualification for the Cup Winners' Cup first round |
| 7 | Heart of Midlothian | 44 | 11 | 20 | 13 | 37 | 43 | −6 | 42 | |
| 8 | Kilmarnock | 44 | 12 | 16 | 16 | 36 | 45 | −9 | 40 | |
| 9 | Partick Thistle | 44 | 12 | 16 | 16 | 46 | 57 | −11 | 40 | |
| 10 | St Johnstone (R) | 44 | 10 | 20 | 14 | 35 | 47 | −12 | 40 | Relegation to the 1994–95 Scottish First Division |
| 11 | Raith Rovers (R) | 44 | 6 | 19 | 19 | 46 | 80 | −34 | 31 | Relegation to the 1994–95 Scottish First Division |
| 12 | Dundee (R) | 44 | 8 | 13 | 23 | 42 | 57 | −15 | 29 | Relegation to the 1994–95 Scottish First Division |

Source: RSSSF
Rules for classification: 1) points; 2) goal difference; 3) number of goals scored.
(C) Champions; (R) Relegated

Champions: Rangers
Relegated: St Johnstone, Raith Rovers, Dundee

== Scottish First Division ==
| Pos | Team | Pld | W | D | L | GF | GA | GD | Pts | Promotion or relegation |
|---|---|---|---|---|---|---|---|---|---|---|
| 1 | Falkirk (C, P) | 44 | 26 | 14 | 4 | 81 | 32 | +49 | 66 | Promotion to the Premier Division |
| 2 | Dunfermline Athletic | 44 | 29 | 7 | 8 | 93 | 35 | +58 | 65 | |
| 3 | Airdrieonians | 44 | 20 | 14 | 10 | 58 | 38 | +20 | 54 | |
| 4 | Hamilton Academical | 44 | 19 | 12 | 13 | 66 | 54 | +12 | 50 | |
| 5 | Clydebank | 44 | 18 | 14 | 12 | 56 | 48 | +8 | 50 | |
| 6 | St Mirren | 44 | 21 | 8 | 15 | 42 | 48 | −6 | 50 | |
| 7 | Ayr United | 44 | 14 | 14 | 16 | 42 | 52 | −10 | 42 | |
| 8 | Dumbarton (R) | 44 | 11 | 14 | 19 | 48 | 59 | −11 | 36 | Relegation to the Second Division |
| 9 | Stirling Albion (R) | 44 | 13 | 9 | 22 | 41 | 68 | −27 | 35 | Relegation to the Second Division |
| 10 | Clyde (R) | 44 | 10 | 12 | 22 | 35 | 58 | −23 | 32 | Relegation to the Second Division |
| 11 | Morton (R) | 44 | 6 | 17 | 21 | 44 | 75 | −31 | 29 | Relegation to the Second Division |
| 12 | Brechin City (R) | 44 | 6 | 7 | 31 | 30 | 81 | −51 | 19 | Relegation to the Second Division |

Source: RSSSF and statto
Rules for classification: 1) points; 2) goal difference; 3) number of goals scored.
(C) Champions; (P) Promoted; (R) Relegated

Promoted: Falkirk
Relegated: Dumbarton, Stirling Albion, Clyde, Morton, Brechin City

== Scottish Second Division ==
| Pos | Team | Pld | W | D | L | GF | GA | GD | Pts | Promotion or relegation |
|---|---|---|---|---|---|---|---|---|---|---|
| 1 | Stranraer (C, P) | 39 | 23 | 10 | 6 | 63 | 35 | +28 | 56 | Promotion to the First Division |
| 2 | Berwick Rangers | 39 | 18 | 12 | 9 | 75 | 46 | +29 | 48 | |
| 3 | Stenhousemuir | 39 | 19 | 9 | 11 | 62 | 44 | +18 | 47 | |
| 4 | Meadowbank Thistle | 39 | 17 | 13 | 9 | 62 | 48 | +14 | 47 | |
| 5 | Queen of the South | 39 | 17 | 9 | 13 | 69 | 48 | +21 | 43 | |
| 6 | East Fife | 39 | 15 | 11 | 13 | 58 | 52 | +6 | 41 | |
| 7 | Alloa Athletic (R) | 39 | 12 | 17 | 10 | 41 | 39 | +2 | 41 | Relegation to the Third Division |
| 8 | Forfar Athletic (R) | 39 | 14 | 11 | 14 | 58 | 58 | 0 | 39 | Relegation to the Third Division |
| 9 | East Stirlingshire (R) | 39 | 13 | 11 | 15 | 54 | 57 | −3 | 37 | Relegation to the Third Division |
| 10 | Montrose (R) | 39 | 14 | 8 | 17 | 56 | 61 | −5 | 36 | Relegation to the Third Division |
| 11 | Queen's Park (R) | 39 | 12 | 10 | 17 | 52 | 76 | −24 | 34 | Relegation to the Third Division |
| 12 | Arbroath (R) | 39 | 12 | 9 | 18 | 42 | 67 | −25 | 33 | Relegation to the Third Division |
| 13 | Albion Rovers (R) | 39 | 7 | 10 | 22 | 37 | 66 | −29 | 24 | Relegation to the Third Division |
| 14 | Cowdenbeath (R) | 39 | 6 | 8 | 25 | 40 | 72 | −32 | 20 | Relegation to the Third Division |

Rules for classification: 1) points; 2) goal difference; 3) number of goals scored.
(C) Champions; (P) Promoted; (R) Relegated

Promoted: Stranraer
Relegated: Alloa Athletic, Forfar Athletic, East Stirlingshire, Montrose, Queen's Park, Arbroath, Albion Rovers, Cowdenbeath

== Other honours ==
=== Cup honours ===
| Competition | Winner | Score | Runner-up |
|---|---|---|---|
| Scottish Cup | Dundee United | 1 – 0 | Rangers |
| League Cup | Rangers | 2 – 1 | Hibernian |
| Challenge Cup | Falkirk | 3 – 0 | St Mirren |
| Youth Cup | Rangers | 5 – 3 | Airdrieonians |
| Junior Cup | Largs Thistle | 1 – 0 | Glenafton Athletic |

=== Individual honours ===
==== SPFA awards ====
| Award | Winner | Club |
|---|---|---|
| Players' Player of the Year | (England) Mark Hateley | Rangers |
| Young Player of the Year | (Scotland) Phil O'Donnell | Motherwell |

==== SFWA awards ====
| Award | Winner | Club |
|---|---|---|
| Footballer of the Year | (England) Mark Hateley | Rangers |
| Manager of the year | (Scotland) Walter Smith | Rangers |

== Scottish clubs in Europe ==
| Club | Competition(s) | Final round | Coef. |
|---|---|---|---|
| Rangers | UEFA Champions League | First round | 2.00 |
| Aberdeen | UEFA Cup Winners' Cup | Second round | 4.00 |
| Celtic | UEFA Europa League | Second round | 5.00 |
| Dundee United | UEFA Europa League | First round | 2.00 |
| Heart of Midlothian | UEFA Europa League | First round | 2.00 |

Average coefficient – 3.000

== Scotland national team ==
| Date | Venue | Opponents | Score | Competition | Scotland scorer(s) |
|---|---|---|---|---|---|
| 8 September 1993 | Pittodrie, Aberdeen (H) | Switzerland | 1–1 | WCQG1 | John Collins |
| 13 October 1993 | Stadio Olimpico, Rome (A) | Italy | 1–3 | WCQG1 | Kevin Gallacher |
| 17 November 1993 | Ta Quali Stadium, Valletta (A) | Malta | 2–0 | WCQG1 | Billy McKinlay, Colin Hendry |
| 23 March 1994 | Hampden Park, Glasgow (H) | Netherlands | 0–1 | Friendly | |
| 20 April 1994 | Ernst-Happel-Stadion, Vienna (A) | Austria | 2–1 | Friendly | John McGinlay, Billy McKinlay |
| 27 May 1994 | Galgenwaard Stadion, Utrecht (A) | Netherlands | 1–3 | Friendly | Duncan Shearer |

Key:

- (H) = Home match
- (A) = Away match
- WCQG1 = World Cup qualifying – Group 1

== See also ==
- 1993–94 Dundee United F.C. season
- 1993–94 Rangers F.C. season
