= Craig Brewster =

Scottish footballer (born 1966)

Personal information
- Full name: Craig James Brewster
- Date of birth: 13 December 1966 (age 59)
- Place of birth: Dundee, Scotland
- Position: Striker

Team information
- Current team: Roffey (first-team coach)

Youth career
- –1985: Dundee United

Senior career*
Years	Team	Apps	(Gls)
1985–1991	Forfar Athletic	191	(37)
1991–1993	Raith Rovers	86	(34)
1993–1996	Dundee United	90	(40)
1996–2001	Ionikos	155	(45)
2001–2002	Hibernian	25	(3)
2002–2004	Dunfermline Athletic	99	(20)
2004–2006	Inverness Caledonian Thistle	31	(10)
2006	Dundee United	4	(0)
2007	Aberdeen	7	(3)
2007	Inverness Caledonian Thistle	2	(1)
2009–2010	Ross County	10	(3)
Total		700	(196)

Managerial career
- 2004–2006: Inverness Caledonian Thistle
- 2006: Dundee United
- 2007–2009: Inverness Caledonian Thistle
- 2012: Crawley Town (caretaker)
- * Club domestic league appearances and goals

Craig James Brewster (born 13 December 1966) is a Scottish former professional footballer, turned coach. He made his name in a long playing career as a striker for numerous clubs in Scotland, particularly Forfar Athletic, Raith Rovers, Dundee United and Dunfermline Athletic. He also had a successful spell with Ionikos in Greece. He is currently a First Team Coach at Roffey.

Brewster started his managerial career with Inverness Caledonian Thistle in the Scottish Premier League, before a short unsuccessful spell as manager of Dundee United forced a resumption of his playing career in 2007 with Aberdeen. He was reappointed manager of Inverness CT for a second time in August 2007, but Brewster was sacked by Inverness in January 2009. Brewster then worked as assistant manager to Derek Adams at Ross County, but left the club in December 2010.

He was appointed coach at Crawley Town in May 2011 and twice became caretaker manager of the club in 2012. After leaving Crawley, he has worked in various coaching roles for Whitehawk, Brighton & Hove Albion and Plymouth Argyle.

== Playing career ==
=== Early career ===
Brewster was born in Stobswell, Dundee and grew up a Dundee United supporter. He signed for the club as a schoolboy, but was not offered professional terms by then manager Jim McLean. Unable to find a senior club, Brewster dropped into junior football with Dundee side Stobswell for a while, before signing for Forfar Athletic in 1985. At this time, his regular playing position was in midfield. His form at Forfar prompted the attention of Raith Rovers, who signed him in 1991. At this time he converted to striker, and formed a prolific partnership with Gordon Dalziel that helped Raith to the First Division title in 1993.

=== Dundee United ===
In 1993, Brewster returned to Dundee United, signing for the Tannadice club for a fee of £250,000. After a slow start in which he struggled to adapt to Premier Division football, Brewster's first season at Tannadice culminated in his greatest moment as a player, scoring the winner for United in the 1994 Scottish Cup Final against Rangers. However, the club was relegated a year later. Brewster helped them towards promotion back to the top flight in 1995–96, scoring four goals in one match against Dumbarton, but when his contract expired at the end of the season he decided to further his career elsewhere. With the Bosman ruling having just come into force, Brewster was entitled to move abroad on a free transfer, and he decided to take advantage of an offer from Greek club Ionikos FC.

=== Greece, Hibs and Dunfermline ===
While other Scottish players who moved to Europe at this time mainly returned home soon afterwards, Brewster remained at Ionikos FC for five seasons. His time in Greece included another national cup final appearance, but Ionikos FC lost the 2000 Greek Cup to AEK Athens. In July 2001, Brewster went on trial at Hibernian, securing a return to Scotland in time for the 2001–02 season. In his first season back in Scotland, Brewster formed a productive partnership with a young Garry O'Connor but due to budget cuts by Hibs, Brewster joined Dunfermline Athletic in 2002. He enjoyed some of the most consistent form of his career playing alongside Stevie Crawford, who had a been a youngster at Raith during Brewster's time there. Despite some clamour from fans and the media for Brewster to be called up to the Scotland squad, this never materialised.

=== Playing and managing ===
Brewster left Dunfermline in November 2004 to become player/manager of Inverness. After 18 months with Inverness, he then joined Dundee United as player/manager. This move meant he became the most expensive 39-year-old footballer ever, costing the Terrors a reported £340,000. A run of poor results meant that Brewster left United in October 2006. He joined Aberdeen as a player in December 2006, signing a contract until the end of the 2006–07 season. He linked up again with Jimmy Calderwood, who had been his manager at Dunfermline. Brewster made his debut for Aberdeen as a substitute in a goalless draw with Hibernian on 2 January 2007, and he scored his first goal for Aberdeen with a header in a Scottish Cup tie against the same opponents eight days later. Brewster then suffered a dislocated shoulder in a draw against Inverness. Doubts were cast over his playing future, but Brewster returned in early March and he signed a six-month extension to his Aberdeen contract in May 2007.

His contract with Aberdeen was cut short, however, when he returned to management with Inverness in August 2007. He only played in two league games for Inverness in his second spell with that club, scoring the winning goal in a SPL match against Hearts. After being sacked as Inverness manager in early 2009, Brewster signed a contract with Highland derby rivals Ross County until the end of the 2008–09 season.

== Coaching career ==
=== Inverness CT ===
In November 2004, Brewster accepted the job of player–manager with Inverness Caledonian Thistle. He helped to establish the club in the Scottish Premier League after John Robertson had left to take the position at Hearts.

=== Dundee United ===
Brewster was appointed player–manager of Dundee United in January 2006. His return to United yielded little success, however, as despite going unbeaten in his first three games, the remainder of the 2005–06 season brought just one win (against Livingston). Brewster had to wait four league games into the 2006–07 season for his second league win, and oversaw only two league wins in his nine months at Tannadice.

On 29 October 2006, after a 5–1 defeat to Falkirk, Brewster and assistant Malky Thomson left by "mutual agreement". After leaving Dundee United he was linked with several managerial vacancies, including those at former clubs Dunfermline, Raith and Ionikos, but he returned to playing with Aberdeen instead.

=== Return to Inverness ===
Brewster returned to management with Inverness in August 2007, after previous manager Charlie Christie had resigned. Inheriting a team that was bottom of the league with no points, the team went on a good run of form culminating in December 2007 with a remarkable 3–2 win over Celtic, despite having been 0–2 down and having a player sent off. Pressure began to mount on Brewster in early 2008, however, when the team went on a run of seven consecutive defeats. Brewster stuck to a tough but unpopular stance regarding player discipline and contracts. Results eventually improved with the team finishing ninth in the league. This improvement was not maintained during the 2008–09 season, however. Brewster was sacked on 19 January 2009 following a run of seven consecutive league defeats, that left the team bottom of the league.

=== Ross County ===
Brewster was appointed assistant manager of Ross County, working with manager Derek Adams. Ross County reached the 2010 Scottish Cup Final under their management. Brewster left the club in December 2010, soon after Willie McStay had replaced Adams as manager.

=== Crawley Town ===
After six months out of work, Brewster was appointed first team coach of Crawley Town by manager Steve Evans in June 2011. Brewster was appointed caretaker manager on 9 April 2012, after the departure of Evans, until the end of the season. Brewster guided the club to promotion to Football League One with three wins from their last six games. He was retained as a coach when Sean O'Driscoll was appointed manager in May 2012. Brewster was again placed in caretaker charge, along with Steve Coppell, after O'Driscoll left in July 2012.

=== After Crawley ===
In November 2013, Brewster joined Whitehawk as assistant manager. He worked for Darren Freeman, but Freeman was sacked as manager in January 2014. Brewster subsequently moved to a coaching position with the youth academy at Brighton & Hove Albion.

=== Plymouth Argyle ===
In June 2015, Derek Adams appointed Brewster to the position of assistant manager at Plymouth Argyle.

Brewster left Argyle at the end of the 2017-18 season, after a hip operation he had undergone in January 2018 had seen him not feature on the sidelines for Argyle for the back-end of the season. He was replaced as assistant by Paul Wotton, with Kevin Nancekivell stepping up to the first team coaching team. Brewster later expressed his sadness and surprise at being released by the club.

=== Horsham ===
On 25 November 2019, Brewster was appointed sporting director of Horsham.

On 1 July 2021, Brewster was appointed Head of Youth Development at Horsham.
