= 1993–94 Scottish Cup =

Tournament details
- Country: Scotland

Final positions
- Champions: Dundee United
- Runners-up: Rangers

The 1993–94 Scottish Cup was the 109th staging of Scotland's most prestigious football knockout competition. The Cup was won by Dundee United who defeated Rangers in the final.

== First round ==
| Home team | Score | Away team |
|---|---|---|
| Albion Rovers | 0 – 0 | Huntly |
| Cowdenbeath | 1 – 1 | Queen's Park |
| East Fife | 5 – 0 | Rothes |
| Forfar Athletic | 8 – 3 | Queen of the South |
| Ross County | 11 – 0 | St Cuthbert Wanderers |
| Stranraer | 3 – 3 | Whitehill Welfare |

=== Replays ===
| Home team | Score | Away team |
|---|---|---|
| Huntly | 5 – 3 | Albion Rovers |
| Whitehill Welfare | 0 – 4 | Stranraer |
| Queen's Park | 2 – 3 | Cowdenbeath |

== Second round ==
| Home team | Score | Away team |
|---|---|---|
| Huntly | 1 – 2 | Stranraer |
| Alloa Athletic | 4 – 0 | Gala Fairydean |
| Cowdenbeath | 1 – 0 | Stenhousemuir |
| Selkirk | 0 – 3 | Arbroath |
| Berwick Rangers | 1 – 0 | East Fife |
| East Stirlingshire | 4 – 1 | Cove Rangers |
| Forfar Athletic | 0 – 4 | Ross County |
| Meadowbank Thistle | 1 – 2 | Montrose |

== Third round ==
| Home team | Score | Away team |
|---|---|---|
| Alloa Athletic | 2 – 0 | Ross County |
| East Stirlingshire | 1 – 3 | Aberdeen |
| Airdrieonians | 1 – 1 | Dunfermline Athletic |
| Arbroath | 2 – 3 | Dundee United |
| Clydebank | 1 – 1 | Dundee |
| Hibernian | 2 – 1 | Clyde |
| Kilmarnock | 2 – 1 | Ayr United |
| Greenock Morton | 2 – 2 | Cowdenbeath |
| Motherwell | 1 – 0 | Celtic |
| Partick Thistle | 0 – 1 | Hearts |
| Raith Rovers | 2 – 0 | Brechin City |
| Rangers | 4 – 1 | Dumbarton |
| St Johnstone | 2 – 0 | Hamilton Academical |
| St Mirren | 2 – 0 | Montrose |
| Stirling Albion | 1 – 0 | Berwick Rangers |
| Stranraer | 2 – 1 | Falkirk |

=== Replays ===
| Home team | Score | Away team |
|---|---|---|
| Dundee | 2 – 1 | Clydebank |
| Cowdenbeath | 1 – 2 | Greenock Morton |
| Dunfermline Athletic | 1 – 3 | Airdrieonians |

== Fourth round ==
| Home team | Score | Away team |
|---|---|---|
| St Johnstone | 3 – 3 | Stirling Albion |
| Dundee | 3 – 1 | St Mirren |
| Hibernian | 1 – 2 | Hearts |
| Aberdeen | 1 – 0 | Raith Rovers |
| Airdrieonians | 1 – 0 | Stranraer |
| Dundee United | 2 – 2 | Motherwell |
| Greenock Morton | 0 – 1 | Kilmarnock |
| Rangers | 6 – 0 | Alloa Athletic |

=== Replays ===
| Home team | Score | Away team |
|---|---|---|
| Stirling Albion | 0 – 2 | St Johnstone |
| Motherwell | 0 – 1 | Dundee United |

== Quarter-finals ==
| Home team | Score | Away team |
|---|---|---|
| Airdrieonians | 0 – 0 | Dundee United |
| Kilmarnock | 1 – 0 | Dundee |
| Rangers | 2 – 0 | Hearts |
| St Johnstone | 1 – 1 | Aberdeen |

=== Replays ===
| Home team | Score | Away team |
|---|---|---|
| Aberdeen | 2 – 0 | St Johnstone |
| Dundee United | 2 – 0 | Airdrieonians |

== Semi-finals ==
9 April 1994

| Aberdeen | 1–1 | Dundee United |
|---|---|---|
| Duncan Shearer | | Brian Welsh |

Hampden Park, Glasgow
Attendance: 21,397

10 April 1994

| Kilmarnock | 0–0 | Rangers |

Hampden Park, Glasgow
Attendance: 35,134

=== Replays ===
12 April 1994

| Dundee United | 1–0 | Aberdeen |
|---|---|---|
| Jim McInally |

Hampden Park, Glasgow
Attendance: 13,936

13 April 1994

| Rangers | 2–1 | Kilmarnock |
|---|---|---|
| Mark Hateley | | Tom Black |

Hampden Park, Glasgow
Attendance: 29,860

== Final ==
21 May 1994

| Dundee United | 1–0 | Rangers |
|---|---|---|
| Brewster 47' |

Hampden Park, Glasgow
Attendance: 37,450
Referee: Douglas Hope (Erskine)

== See also ==
- 1993–94 in Scottish football
- 1993–94 Scottish League Cup
