= 1993–94 Scottish Premier Division =

88th season of top-tier football league in Scotland

Scottish Premier Division
- Season: 1993–94
- Dates: 7 August 1993 - 1994
- Champions: Rangers; 9th Premier Division title 44th Scottish title
- Relegated: St Johnstone; Raith Rovers; Dundee
- Champions League: Rangers
- Cup Winners' Cup: Dundee United
- UEFA Cup: Aberdeen; Motherwell
- Matches: 264
- Goals: 583 (2.21 per match)
- Top goalscorer: Mark Hateley (22)

The 1993–94 Scottish Premier Division season began on 7 August 1993 and was the last season of the twelve-team league, with three teams relegated to make way for the ten-team league the following season. It was also the final season with the rule of awarding two points for a win, with three points given from then on.

== Overview ==
The 1993–94 Scottish Premier Division season ended in success for Rangers who won the title by three points from nearest rivals Aberdeen to clinch six titles in a row. St Johnstone, Raith Rovers and Dundee were relegated to the First Division after finishing in the bottom three positions. As champions, Rangers qualified for the Champions League while Aberdeen were joined by third-placed Motherwell in qualifying for the UEFA Cup. Sixth-placed Dundee United qualified for the Cup Winners' Cup after winning the Scottish Cup for the first time.

== Clubs ==
=== Promotion and relegation from 1992–93 ===
Promoted from First Division to Premier League

- Raith Rovers
- Kilmarnock

Relegated from Premier Division to First Division

- Falkirk
- Airdrieonians

=== Stadia and locations ===
Location of clubs in the 1993–94 Scottish Premier Division

Team	Location	Stadium
Aberdeen	Aberdeen	Pittodrie Stadium
Celtic	Parkhead, Glasgow	Celtic Park
Dundee	Dundee	Dens Park
Dundee United	Dundee	Tannadice Park
Heart of Midlothian	Gorgie, Edinburgh	Tynecastle Park
Hibernian	Leith, Edinburgh	Easter Road
Kilmarnock	Kilmarnock	Rugby Park
Motherwell	Motherwell	Fir Park
Partick Thistle	Maryhill, Glasgow	Firhill Stadium
Raith Rovers	Kirkcaldy	Stark's Park
Rangers	Ibrox, Glasgow	Ibrox Park
St Johnstone	Perth	McDiarmid Park

=== Managers ===
Team	Manager
Aberdeen	(Scotland) Willie Miller
Celtic	(Scotland) Lou Macari
Dundee	(Scotland) Jim Duffy
Dundee United	(Federal Republic of Yugoslavia) Ivan Golac
Heart of Midlothian	(Scotland) Sandy Clark
Hibernian	(Scotland) Alex Miller
Kilmarnock	(Scotland) Tommy Burns
Motherwell	(Scotland) Tommy McLean
Partick Thistle	(Scotland) John Lambie
Raith Rovers	(Northern Ireland) Jimmy Nicholl
Rangers	(Scotland) Walter Smith
St Johnstone	(Scotland) Paul Sturrock

==== Managerial changes ====
Team	Outgoing manager	Date of vacancy	Manner of departure	Incoming manager	Date of appointment
Dundee United	(Scotland) Jim McLean	July 1993	Retired	(Socialist Federal Republic of Yugoslavia) Ivan Golac	July 1993
Dundee	(England) Simon Stainrod	August 1993	Became director of football	(Scotland) Jim Duffy	August 1993
Celtic	(Republic of Ireland) Liam Brady	6 October 1993	Resigned	(Scotland) Lou Macari	27 October 1993
St Johnstone	(Northern Ireland) John McClelland	November 1993	Sacked	(Scotland) Paul Sturrock	November 1993

== League table ==
Pos	Team	Pld	W	D	L	GF	GA	GD	Pts	Qualification or relegation
1	Rangers (C)	44	22	14	8	74	41	+33	58	Qualification for the Champions League qualifying round
2	Aberdeen	44	17	21	6	58	36	+22	55	Qualification for the UEFA Cup preliminary round
3	Motherwell	44	20	14	10	58	43	+15	54	Qualification for the UEFA Cup preliminary round
4	Celtic	44	15	20	9	51	38	+13	50	
5	Hibernian	44	16	15	13	53	48	+5	47	
6	Dundee United	44	11	20	13	47	48	−1	42	Qualification for the Cup Winners' Cup first round
7	Heart of Midlothian	44	11	20	13	37	43	−6	42	
8	Kilmarnock	44	12	16	16	36	45	−9	40	
9	Partick Thistle	44	12	16	16	46	57	−11	40	
10	St Johnstone (R)	44	10	20	14	35	47	−12	40	Relegation to the 1994–95 Scottish First Division
11	Raith Rovers (R)	44	6	19	19	46	80	−34	31	Relegation to the 1994–95 Scottish First Division
12	Dundee (R)	44	8	13	23	42	57	−15	29	Relegation to the 1994–95 Scottish First Division

Source: RSSSF
Rules for classification: 1) points; 2) goal difference; 3) number of goals scored.
(C) Champions; (R) Relegated

== Results ==
=== Matches 1–22 ===
During matches 1-22 each team plays every other team twice (home and away).

Home \ Away	ABE	CEL	DND	DNU	HOM	HIB	KIL	MOT	PAR	RAI	RAN	STJ
Aberdeen		1–1	1–0	2–0	0–0	4–0	1–0	1–1	2–1	4–1	2–0	0–0
Celtic	0–1		2–1	1–1	0–0	1–1	0–0	2–0	3–0	2–0	0–0	1–0
Dundee	1–1	1–1		1–2	2–0	3–2	1–0	1–2	2–2	0–1	1–1	0–1
Dundee United	1–1	1–0	1–0		0–0	2–2	0–0	0–0	2–2	2–2	1–3	2–0
Heart of Midlothian	1–1	1–0	1–2	1–1		1–0	0–1	2–3	2–1	1–0	2–2	1–1
Hibernian	2–1	1–1	2–0	2–0	0–2		2–1	3–2	0–0	3–2	0–1	0–0
Kilmarnock	1–1	2–2	1–0	1–1	0–0	1–1		0–1	3–1	1–0	0–2	0–0
Motherwell	0–0	2–2	1–0	2–0	2–0	0–2	2–2		1–0	4–1	0–2	1–0
Partick Thistle	3–2	0–1	3–2	1–2	0–0	0–0	0–1	1–0		1–1	1–1	4–1
Raith Rovers	1–1	1–4	2–1	1–1	1–0	1–2	2–2	0–3	2–2		1–1	1–1
Rangers	2–0	1–2	3–1	0–3	2–1	2–1	1–2	1–2	1–1	2–2		2–0
St Johnstone	1–1	2–1	2–1	1–1	2–0	1–3	0–1	3–0	1–3	1–1	1–2	

Source: Global Sports Archive
Legend: Blue = home team win; Yellow = draw; Red = away team win.

=== Matches 23–44 ===
During matches 23-44 each team plays every other team twice (home and away).

Home \ Away	ABE	CEL	DND	DNU	HOM	HIB	KIL	MOT	PAR	RAI	RAN	STJ
Aberdeen		1–1	1–1	1–0	0–1	2–3	3–1	0–0	2–0	4–0	0–0	1–1
Celtic	2–2		1–1	0–0	2–2	1–0	1–0	0–1	1–1	2–1	2–4	1–1
Dundee	0–1	0–2		1–1	0–2	4–0	3–0	1–3	1–0	2–2	1–1	0–1
Dundee United	0–1	1–3	1–1		3–0	3–0	1–3	1–2	2–2	2–3	0–0	0–0
Heart of Midlothian	1–1	0–2	0–2	2–0		1–1	1–1	0–0	1–0	0–1	1–2	2–2
Hibernian	3–1	0–0	2–0	0–1	0–0		0–0	0–2	5–1	3–0	1–0	0–0
Kilmarnock	2–3	2–0	1–0	1–1	0–1	0–3		0–0	1–2	0–0	1–0	0–0
Motherwell	1–1	2–1	3–1	1–2	1–1	0–0	1–0		2–2	3–1	2–1	0–1
Partick Thistle	1–1	1–0	1–0	1–0	0–1	1–0	1–0	0–0		2–2	1–2	0–0
Raith Rovers	0–2	0–0	1–1	0–2	2–2	1–1	3–2	3–3	0–1		1–2	1–1
Rangers	1–1	1–1	0–0	2–1	2–2	2–0	3–0	2–1	5–1	4–0		4–0
St Johnstone	0–1	0–1	1–1	1–1	0–0	2–2	0–1	2–1	1–0	2–0	0–4	

Source: Global Sports Archive
Legend: Blue = home team win; Yellow = draw; Red = away team win.

== Awards ==
- Player awards

Award	Winner	Club
PFA Players' Player of the Year	(England) Mark Hateley	Rangers
PFA Young Player of the Year	(Scotland) Phil O'Donnell	Motherwell
SFWA Footballer of the Year	(England) Mark Hateley	Rangers

- Manager awards

Award	Winner	Club
SFWA Manager of the Year	(Scotland) Walter Smith	Rangers

== See also ==
- 1993–94 in Scottish football
- 1993–94 Dundee United F.C. season
- 1993–94 Rangers F.C. season
- Nine in a row
