= 1993–94 Scottish League Cup =

Tournament details
- Country: Scotland

Final positions
- Champions: Rangers
- Runners-up: Hibernian

The 1993–94 Scottish League Cup was the 48th staging of the Scotland's second most prestigious football knockout competition.

The competition was won by Rangers, who defeated Hibernian 2–1 in the final at Celtic Park. Ally McCoist scored the winning goal, in his first game after returning from a long-term injury (a leg break) suffered earlier in the year while playing for Scotland.

The club record defeats of Albion Rovers (11–1) and Arbroath (9–1) were set earlier in the competition.

== First round ==
Home team	Score	Away team
Montrose	0–1	East Stirlingshire
Queen of the South	1–2	Stranraer
Alloa Athletic	1–0	Berwick Rangers
East Fife	1–2	Albion Rovers
Queen's Park	0–1	Arbroath
Stenhousemuir	3–1	Forfar Athletic

== Second round ==
Albion Rovers' 11–1 defeat by Partick Thistle is their club record defeat.

Home team	Score	Away team
Albion Rovers	1–11	Partick Thistle
Clyde	1–2	St Johnstone
Dunfermline Athletic	2–0	East Stirlingshire
Heart of Midlothian	2–0	Stranraer
Raith Rovers	1–2	Arbroath
Rangers	1–0	Dumbarton
Aberdeen	5–0	Clydebank
Airdrieonians	2–1	Cowdenbeath
Ayr United	0–6	Motherwell
Brechin City	0–1	St Mirren
Hamilton Accies	0–1	Dundee United
Hibernian	2–0	Alloa Athletic
Kilmarnock	1–2	Morton
Meadowbank Thistle	1 – 1(p)	Dundee
Stenhousemuir	1–2	Falkirk
Stirling Albion	0–2	Celtic

== Third round ==
Arbroath's 9–1 defeat by Celtic is their club record defeat.

Home team	Score	Away team
Arbroath	1–9	Celtic
Heart of Midlothian	0–1	Falkirk
St Johnstone	0–2	Airdrieonians
Aberdeen	5–2	Motherwell
Dunfermline Athletic	0–2	Rangers
Hibernian	2–1	Dundee
Morton	0–1	Partick Thistle
St Mirren	0–1	Dundee United

== Quarter-finals ==
1 September 1993

Rangers	2–1 (a.e.t.)	Aberdeen

Ibrox Stadium, Glasgow
Attendance: 44,928

31 August 1993

Celtic	1–0	Airdrieonians

Celtic Park, Glasgow
Attendance: 25,738

31 August 1993

Dundee United	3–3 (a.e.t.)	Falkirk
Penalties
	4–2

Tannadice Park, Dundee
Attendance: 8,750

31 August 1993

Partick Thistle	2–2 (a.e.t.)	Hibernian
Penalties
	2–3

Firhill Stadium, Glasgow
Attendance: 7,688

== Semi-finals ==
22 September 1993

Rangers	1–0	Celtic

Ibrox Stadium, Glasgow
Attendance: 47,420

21 September 1993

Hibernian	1–0	Dundee United

Tynecastle Stadium, Edinburgh
Attendance: 19,024

== Final ==
24 October 1993

Rangers	2–1	Hibernian
Durrant 55'; McCoist 81'	Report	McPherson 59' (o.g.)

Celtic Park, Glasgow
Attendance: 47,632
