= 1990–91 Rangers F.C. season =

Rangers
1990–91 season
- Chairman: David Murray
- Manager: Graeme Souness (until 16 April); Walter Smith (from 19 April)
- Ground: Ibrox Stadium
- Scottish Premier Division: 1st
- Scottish Cup: Quarter-finals
- League Cup: Winners
- European Cup: Second round
- Top goalscorer: League: Mark Walters (12); All: Mo Johnston (19)

The 1990–91 season was the 111th season of competitive football by Rangers.

== Overview ==
Rangers played a total of 48 competitive matches during the 1990–91 season. The team finished first in the Scottish Premier Division and won the third of their nine league titles in a row.

There was significant transfer activity during the season with England international striker Mark Hateley arriving from AS Monaco and Terry Butcher departing for Coventry City.

Manager Graeme Souness left Rangers to go to Liverpool with just four games left of the season. The managers job was given to Souness' assistant Walter Smith who managed to lead Rangers to the title, with a 2–0 win over Aberdeen at Ibrox on the last day of the season.

In the cup competitions, they were knocked out of the Scottish Cup at the quarter-finals stage, losing 2–0 to Celtic at Parkhead. Rangers won the Scottish League Cup, defeating Celtic 2–1 AET.

In Europe they defeated Valletta of Malta 10–0 on aggregate in the first round, but were knocked out in the second round by Serbian side Red Star Belgrade (Red Star would go on to lift the trophy, beating Marseille in the final). Rangers lost the tie 4–1 on aggregate.

== Transfers ==
=== In ===
Date	Player	From	Fee
21 June 1990	(England) Mark Hateley	(France) AS Monaco	£1,000,000
2 August 1990	(Netherlands) Pieter Huistra	(Netherlands) FC Twente	£300,000
23 August 1990	(England) Terry Hurlock	(England) Millwall	£300,000
9 October 1990	(Soviet Union) Oleh Kuznetsov	(Soviet Union) Dynamo Kyiv	£1,200,000
25 March 1991	(Scotland) Brian Reid	(Scotland) Greenock Morton	£300,000

=== Out ===
Date	Player	To	Fee
1 July 1990	(Scotland) Graeme Souness	Retired	
4 July 1990	(Scotland) Derek Ferguson	(Scotland) Heart of Midlothian	£750,000
15 November 1990	(England) Terry Butcher	(England) Coventry City	£500,000

- Expenditure: ▼£3,100,000
- Income: ▲£1,250,000
- Total loss/gain: ▼£1,850,000

== Results ==
All results are written with Rangers' score first.

=== Scottish Premier Division ===
Date	Opponent	Venue	Result	Attendance	Scorers
25 August 1990	Dunfermline Athletic	H	3–1	39,951	Hateley, Johnston, Walters
1 September 1990	Hibernian	A	0–0	17,500	
8 September 1990	Heart of Midlothian	A	3–1	22,101	McCoist (2), Huistra
15 September 1990	Celtic	H	1–1	38,543	Hurlock
22 September 1990	Dundee United	A	1–2	16,270	Johnston
29 September 1990	Motherwell	H	1–0	34,863	Brown
6 October 1990	Aberdeen	A	0–0	19,500	
13 October 1990	St Mirren	H	5–0	38,031	McCoist (2, 1 (pen.)), Walters (2), Johnston
20 October 1990	St Johnstone	A	0–0	10,054	
3 November 1990	Hibernian	H	4–0	35,925	Hateley (2), Walters, Steven
10 November 1990	Dundee United	H	1–2	36,995	McCoist
17 November 1990	Motherwell	A	4–2	16,457	Stevens (2), Walters, Johnston
20 November 1990	Dunfermline Athletic	A	1–0	14,480	Hateley
25 November 1990	Celtic	A	2–1	52,565	Johnston, McCoist
1 December 1990	Heart of Midlothian	H	4–0	37,623	Johnston, Hurlock, McCoist, Walters (pen.)
8 December 1990	St Johnstone	H	4–1	34,610	Walters (2), Johnston (pen.), Stevens
15 December 1990	St Mirren	A	3–0	15,197	Walters, Johnston (pen.), Hateley
22 December 1990	Aberdeen	H	2–2	37,998	McCoist (2)
29 December 1990	Dundee United	A	2–1	17,564	Johnston, Walters
2 January 1991	Celtic	H	2–0	38,399	Walters, Hateley
5 January 1991	Heart of Midlothian	A	1–0	20,956	Hateley
12 January 1991	Dunfermline Athletic	H	2–0	35,120	Huistra, Johnston
19 January 1991	Hibernian	A	2–0	15,500	Johnston, Houchen (o.g.)
9 February 1991	St Mirren	H	1–0	31,769	McCoist
16 February 1991	Motherwell	H	2–0	32,192	McCoist, Hateley
26 February 1991	St Johnstone	A	1–1	10,721	Huistra
2 March 1991	Aberdeen	A	0–1	22,500	
9 March 1991	Heart of Midlothian	H	2–1	36,128	Steven, Walters
24 March 1991	Celtic	A	0–3	52,000	
30 March 1991	Dunfermline Athletic	A	1–0	14,256	Stevens
6 April 1991	Hibernian	H	0–0	35,507	
13 April 1991	St Johnstone	H	3–0	35,930	Durrant, Spencer, Huistra
20 April 1991	St Mirren	A	1–0	18,473	S.Robertson
24 April 1991	Dundee United	H	1–0	32,397	I.Ferguson
4 May 1991	Motherwell	A	0–3	17,672	
11 May 1991	Aberdeen	H	2–0	37,652	Hateley (2)

=== Scottish League Cup ===
Date	Round	Opponent	Venue	Result	Attendance	Scorers
21 August 1990	R3	East Stirlingshire	H	5–0	25,595	Hateley (2), Steven, Walters, Johnston
28 August 1990	R4	Kilmarnock	H	1–0	32,671	Johnston
4 September 1990	QF	Raith Rovers	H	6–2	31,320	McCoist (3), Johnston, Butcher, Steven
26 September 1990	SF	Aberdeen	N	1–0	40,855	Steven
28 October 1990	F	Celtic	N	2–1*	62,817	Walters, Gough

*Rangers won the match 2–1 in extra-time

=== Scottish Cup ===
Date	Round	Opponent	Venue	Result	Attendance	Scorers
29 January 1991	R3	Dunfermline Athletic	H	2–0	29,003	Huistra, Spackman
23 February 1991	R4	Cowdenbeath	H	5–0	29,527	Hateley (2), Nisbet, McCoist, Walters (pen.)
17 March 1991	QF	Celtic	A	0–2	52,286	

=== European Cup ===
Date	Round	Opponent	Venue	Result	Attendance	Scorers
19 September 1990	R1	(Malta) Valletta	A	4–0	8,000	Johnston (2), McCoist (pen.), Hateley
2 October 1990	R1	(Malta) Valletta	H	6–0	20,627	Johnston (3, 1 (pen.)), Dodds, Spencer, McCoist
24 October 1990	R2	(Socialist Federal Republic of Yugoslavia) Red Star Belgrade	A	0–3	82,500	
7 November 1990	R2	(Socialist Federal Republic of Yugoslavia) Red Star Belgrade	H	1–1	23,831	McCoist

== Appearances ==
Player	Position	Appearances	Goals
(England) Chris Woods	GK	48	0
(Scotland) John Brown	DF	36	1
(England) Terry Butcher	DF	9	1
(Scotland) Tom Cowan	DF	7	0
(Scotland) Richard Gough	DF	37	1
(Soviet Union) Oleh Kuznetsov	DF	2	0
(Scotland) Stuart Munro	DF	21	0
(Scotland) Scott Nisbet	DF	19	1
(Scotland) Brian Reid	DF	3	0
(England) Gary Stevens	DF	48	4
(England) Chris Vinnicombe	DF	11	0
(Scotland) Ian Durrant	MF	4	1
(Scotland) Ian Ferguson	MF	15	1
(Netherlands) Pieter Huistra	MF	36	5
(England) Terry Hurlock	MF	35	2
(Scotland) Sandy Robertson	MF	18	1
(England) Nigel Spackman	MF	45	1
(England) Trevor Steven	MF	31	5
(England) Mark Walters	MF	39	15
(Scotland) Davie Dodds	FW	6	1
(England) Mark Hateley	FW	42	15
(Scotland) Mo Johnston	FW	39	19
(Scotland) Ally McCoist	FW	36	18
(Scotland) Gary McSwegan	FW	3	0
(Scotland) John Spencer	FW	6	2

== League table ==
Pos	Team	Pld	W	D	L	GF	GA	GD	Pts	Qualification or relegation
1	Rangers (C)	36	24	7	5	62	23	+39	55	Qualification for the European Cup first round
2	Aberdeen	36	22	9	5	62	27	+35	53	Qualification for the UEFA Cup first round
3	Celtic	36	17	7	12	52	38	+14	41	Qualification for the UEFA Cup first round
4	Dundee United	36	17	7	12	41	29	+12	41	
5	Heart of Midlothian	36	14	7	15	48	55	−7	35	

Source: Statto.com
Rules for classification: 1) points; 2) goal difference; 3) number of goals scored.
(C) Champions

== See also ==
- 1990–91 in Scottish football
- 1990–91 Scottish Cup
- 1990–91 Scottish League Cup
- 1990–91 European Cup
- Nine in a row
