= 1988–89 Rangers F.C. season =

Rangers
1988–89 season
- Chairman: David Holmes
- Manager: Graeme Souness
- Ground: Ibrox Stadium
- Scottish Premier Division: 1st (champions)
- Scottish Cup: Runners-up
- League Cup: Winners
- UEFA Cup: Second round
- Top goalscorer: League: Kevin Drinkell (11); All: Kevin Drinkell (19)

The 1988–89 season was the 109th season of competitive football by Rangers.

== Overview ==
Rangers played a total of 53 competitive matches during the 1988–89 season. They regained the Scottish Premier Division title, winning the first of nine consecutive league titles.

England international right back, Gary Stevens was signed from Everton and Kevin Drinkell was brought in to partner Ally McCoist up front.

Results against Celtic were pivotal in the Championship race, winning 5–1 and 4–1 at Ibrox. They also secured their first win at Parkhead since 1980, 2–1 in March. The league was won at Ibrox with a 4–0 demolition of Hearts.

In the cup competitions, they lost the Scottish Cup final 1–0 to Celtic. The team won the Scottish League Cup (Skol Cup) for the third season in a row defeating Aberdeen 3–2.

The European campaign was disappointing. The team qualified for the UEFA Cup and after a fine aggregate win over Polish side GKS Katowice, they were knocked out in the second round by Köln of West Germany.

Lawrence Marlborough sold his controlling interest in Rangers to Scottish businessman David Murray in November 1988. Murray would later take over as chairman from David Holmes.

== Transfer ==
=== In ===
Date	Player	From	Fee
30 June 1988	(England) Kevin Drinkell	(England) Norwich City	£500,000
19 July 1988	(England) Gary Stevens	(England) Everton	£1,000,000
29 July 1988	(Northern Ireland) John Morrow	(Northern Ireland) Linfield	Free
17 September 1988	(Scotland) Andy Gray	(England) West Bromwich Albion	Free
3 October 1988	(Scotland) Neale Cooper	(England) Aston Villa	£250,000
6 February 1989	(Scotland) Tom Cowan	(Scotland) Clyde	£100,000
4 March 1989	(England) Mel Sterland	(England) Sheffield Wednesday	£750,000

=== Out ===
Date	Player	From	Fee
31 May 1988	(Israel) Avi Cohen	(Israel) Maccabi Tel Aviv	Free
1 July 1988	(Denmark) Jan Bartram	(Denmark) Brøndby	£300,000
26 August 1988	(England) Graham Roberts	(England) Chelsea	£475,000
26 August 1988	(England) Jimmy Phillips	(England) Oxford United	£100,000

- Expenditure: ▼£2,600,000
- Income: ▲£875,000
- Total loss/gain: ▼£1,725,000

== Results ==
=== Scottish Premier Division ===
Date	Opponent	Venue	Result	Attendance	Scorers
13 August 1988	Hamilton Academical	A	2–0	10,500	Stevens, McCoist
20 August 1988	Hibernian	H	0–0	41,955	
27 August 1988	Celtic	H	5–1	42,858	McCoist (2), Wilkins, Drinkell, Walters
3 September 1988	Motherwell	A	2–0	20,112	Drinkell, Durrant
17 September 1988	Heart of Midlothian	A	2–1	25,501	Durrant (pen.), Nisbet
24 September 1988	St Mirren	H	2–1	35,523	D.Cooper (pen.), Walters
27 September 1988	Dundee United	A	1–0	20,071	I.Ferguson
1 October 1988	Dundee	H	2–0	40,768	Drinkell, Walters
8 October 1988	Aberdeen	A	1–2	23,370	N.Cooper
12 October 1988	Hibernian	A	1–0	26,000	McCoist
29 October 1988	St Mirren	A	1–1	20,903	Gray
1 November 1988	Heart of Midlothian	H	3–0	36,505	Gough, Walters (pen.), Gray
5 November 1988	Motherwell	H	2–1	36,060	Brown, Drinkell
12 November 1988	Celtic	A	1–3	60,113	Walters
16 November 1988	Hamilton Academical	H	3–1	33,684	Gray, Ferguson, Drinkell
19 November 1988	Dundee	A	0–0	16,514	
26 November 1988	Aberdeen	H	1–0	42,239	Gough
3 December 1988	Dundee United	H	0–1	39,123	
10 December 1988	Heart of Midlothian	A	0–2	26,424	
17 December 1988	Hibernian	H	1–0	36,672	McCall
31 December 1988	Hamilton Academical	A	1–0	10,500	D.Ferguson
3 January 1989	Celtic	H	4–1	42,515	Walters (2, 1 (pen.)), Butcher, I.Ferguson
7 January 1989	Motherwell	A	1–2	19,275	Drinkell
14 January 1989	Aberdeen	A	2–1	23,000	Munro, D.Ferguson
21 January 1989	Dundee	H	3–1	43,202	I.Ferguson, Butcher, McCoist
11 February 1989	Dundee United	A	1–1	22,019	Munro
25 February 1989	St Mirren	H	3–1	39,021	I.Ferguson, McCoist, Walters
11 March 1989	Hamilton Academical	H	3–0	35,733	I.Ferguson, Sterland, Gough
25 March 1989	Hibernian	A	1–0	23,321	Drinkell
1 April 1989	Celtic	A	2–1	60,171	Drinkell, I.Ferguson
8 April 1989	Motherwell	H	1–0	33,782	McCoist
22 April 1989	St Mirren	A	2–0	22,096	I.Ferguson, McCoist
29 April 1989	Heart of Midlothian	H	4–0	42,856	Drinkell (2), Sterland (2)
2 May 1989	Dundee United	H	2–0	39,068	Drinkell, McCoist
6 May 1989	Dundee	A	2–1	14,889	Gray (2)
13 May 1989	Aberdeen	H	0–3	42,480	

=== Scottish League Cup ===
Date	Round	Opponent	Venue	Result	Attendance	Scorers
17 August 1988	R2	Clyde	A	3–0	14,699	Drinkell, Walters, D.Ferguson
24 August 1988	R3	Clydebank	H	6–0	34,376	McCoist, Gough, Walters, Wilkins, Drinkell, Durrant
31 August 1988	QF	Dundee	H	4–1	39,667	McCoist, Walters, I.Ferguson, Forsyth (o.g.)
21 September 1988	SF	Heart of Midlothian	N	3–0	53,623	Walters (2), Nisbet
23 October 1988	F	Aberdeen	N	3–2	72,122	McCoist (2, 1 (pen.)), I.Ferguson

=== Scottish Cup ===
Date	Round	Opponent	Venue	Result	Attendance	Scorers
28 January 1989	R3	Raith Rovers	A	1–1	10,500	I.Ferguson
1 February 1989	R3 R	Raith Rovers	H	3–0	40,307	Walters, Drinkell, Fraser (o.g.)
18 February 1989	R4	Stranraer	H	8–0	41,198	Drinkell (2), Brown (2), McCoist (2, 1 (pen.); I.Ferguson, Walters
21 March 1989	QF	Dundee United	H	2–2	42,177	Drinkell, McCoist
27 March 1989	QF R	Dundee United	A	1–0	21,872	McCoist
15 April 1989	SF	St Johnstone	N	0–0	47,374	
18 April 1989	SF R	St Johnstone	N	4–0	44,205	Walters, Stevens, Drinkell, McCoist
20 May 1989	F	Celtic	N	0–1	72,069	

=== UEFA Cup ===
Date	Round	Opponent	Venue	Result	Attendance	Scorers
7 September 1988	R1	(Poland) GKS Katowice	H	1–0	41,120	Walters
5 October 1988	R1	(Poland) GKS Katowice	A	4–2	40,000	Butcher (2), Durrant, I.Ferguson
26 October 1988	R2	(Germany) Köln	A	0–2	42,000	
9 November 1988	R2	(Germany) Köln	H	1–1	42,204	Drinkell

== Appearances ==
Player	Position	Appearances	Goals
(Scotland) Nicky Walker	GK	14	0
(England) Chris Woods	GK	39	0
(Scotland) John Brown	DF	42	3
(England) Terry Butcher	DF	51	4
(Scotland) Tom Cowan	DF	4	0
(Scotland) Richard Gough	DF	51	4
(Scotland) John McGregor	DF	1	0
(Scotland) Stuart Munro	DF	33	4
(Northern Ireland) Jimmy Nicholl	DF	3	0
(Scotland) Scott Nisbet	DF	10	2
(England) Gary Stevens	DF	52	2
(Scotland) Davie Cooper	MF	33	1
(Scotland) Neale Cooper	MF	17	1
(Scotland) Ian Durrant	MF	14	4
(Scotland) Derek Ferguson	MF	24	3
(Scotland) Ian Ferguson	MF	33	13
(Scotland) Davie Kirkwood	MF	2	0
(Scotland) Ian McCall	MF	7	1
(Scotland) Kevin MacDonald	MF	3	0
(Scotland) Sandy Robertson	MF	2	0
(Scotland) Graeme Souness	MF	10	0
(England) Mark Walters	MF	48	17
(England) Ray Wilkins	MF	45	2
(England) Kevin Drinkell	FW	47	19
(Scotland) Andy Gray	FW	16	5
(Scotland) Ally McCoist	FW	33	18
(Scotland) Gary McSwegan	FW	1	0
(England) Mel Sterland	FW	13	3

== League table ==
Pos	Team	Pld	W	D	L	GF	GA	GD	Pts	Qualification or relegation
1	Rangers (C)	36	26	4	6	62	26	+36	56	Qualification for the European Cup first round
2	Aberdeen	36	18	14	4	51	25	+26	50	Qualification for the UEFA Cup first round
3	Celtic	36	21	4	11	66	44	+22	46	Qualification for the Cup Winners' Cup first round
4	Dundee United	36	16	12	8	44	26	+18	44	Qualification for the UEFA Cup first round
5	Hibernian	36	13	9	14	37	36	+1	35	Qualification for the UEFA Cup first round

Source: Statto
Rules for classification: 1) points; 2) goal difference; 3) number of goals scored.
(C) Champions

== See also ==
- 1988–89 in Scottish football
- 1988–89 Scottish Cup
- 1988–89 Scottish League Cup
- 1988–89 UEFA Cup
- Nine in a row
