= 1989 Scottish Cup final =

- Event: 1988–89 Scottish Cup
Celtic	Rangers
1	0
- Date: 20 May 1989
- Venue: Hampden Park, Glasgow
- Referee: Bob Valentine
- Attendance: 72,069

The 1989 Scottish Cup final was played between Celtic and Rangers at Hampden Park on 20 May 1989.

Celtic won the match 1–0, denying Rangers a domestic treble. The only goal came when Joe Miller capitalised on a defensive error and slotted the ball past Rangers' goalkeeper.

This was the last Old Firm Scottish Cup final for 10 years until 1999.

While less than 50% of the all-time record crowds at Hampden, the attendance of just over 72,000 has become a landmark figure as no match in Scotland has come close to matching it since, owing to subsequent stadium modernisation which left no venue with a greater capacity.

== Match details ==
20 May 1989

Celtic	1–0	Rangers
Joe Miller 42'	Report

Hampden Park, Glasgow
Attendance: 72,069
Referee: Bob Valentine

CELTIC:
GK	(Republic of Ireland) Pat Bonner
DF	(Republic of Ireland) Chris Morris
DF	(Republic of Ireland) Mick McCarthy
DF	(Scotland) Derek Whyte
DF	(Northern Ireland) Anton Rogan
MF	(Scotland) Peter Grant
MF	(Scotland) Roy Aitken
MF	(Scotland) Paul McStay (c)
MF	(Scotland) Tommy Burns
FW	(Scotland) Joe Miller
FW	(Scotland) Mark McGhee
Substitutes:
MF	(Scotland) Billy Stark (unused)
MF	(Scotland) Steve Fulton (unused)
Manager:
(Scotland) Billy McNeill

RANGERS:
GK	(England) Chris Woods
DF	(England) Gary Stevens
DF	(England) Terry Butcher (c)
DF	(Scotland) Richard Gough
DF	(Scotland) Stuart Munro	(substituted off) 67'
MF	(England) Mel Sterland	(substituted off) 70'
MF	(Scotland) Ian Ferguson
MF	(Scotland) John Brown
MF	(England) Mark Walters
FW	(England) Kevin Drinkell
FW	(Scotland) Ally McCoist
Substitutes:
MF	(Scotland) Graeme Souness	(substituted on) 70'
MF	(Scotland) Davie Cooper	(substituted on) 67'
Manager:
(Scotland) Graeme Souness
