= 1990 Scottish League Cup final =

- Event: 1990–91 Scottish League Cup
Celtic	Rangers
1	2
- Date: 28 October 1990
- Venue: Hampden Park, Glasgow
- Referee: Jim McCluskey
- Attendance: 62,817

The 1990 Scottish League Cup final was played on 28 October 1990 at Hampden Park in Glasgow and was the final of the 45th Scottish League Cup (Skol Cup). The final was an Old Firm derby contested by Celtic and Rangers. Rangers won the match 2–1 thanks to goals from Richard Gough and Mark Walters.

== Match details ==
28 October 1990

Celtic	1–2 (a.e.t.)	Rangers
Elliott 52'		Walters 66'; Gough 104'

Hampden Park, Glasgow
Attendance: 62,817
Referee: Jim McCluskey

=== Teams ===
CELTIC :
GK	Packie Bonner
RB	Peter Grant
CB	Dariusz Wdowczyk
CB	Paul Elliott
LB	Anton Rogan
RM	Joe Miller	(substituted off) 1'
CM	Paul McStay (c)
CM	Steve Fulton	(substituted off) 2'
LM	John Collins
CF	Gerry Creaney
CF	Dariusz Dziekanowski
Substitutes:
DF	Chris Morris	(substituted on) 1'
MF	John Hewitt	(substituted on) 2'
Managers:
Billy McNeill

RANGERS :
GK	Chris Woods
RB	Gary Stevens
CB	Richard Gough (c)
CB	John Brown
LB	Stuart Munro
RM	Trevor Steven
CM	Terry Hurlock	(substituted off) 1'
CM	Nigel Spackman
LM	Mark Walters
CF	Ally McCoist	(substituted off) 2'
CF	Mark Hateley
Substitutes:
MF	Pieter Huistra	(substituted on) 1'
MF	Ian Ferguson	(substituted on) 2'
Manager:
Graeme Souness
