= 1988 Scottish League Cup final =

- Event: 1988–89 Scottish League Cup
Aberdeen	Rangers
2	3
- Date: 23 October 1988
- Venue: Hampden Park, Glasgow
- Referee: George Smith
- Attendance: 72,122

The 1988 Scottish League Cup final was played on 23 October 1988 at Hampden Park in Glasgow and was the final of the 43rd Scottish League Cup (Skol Cup). The final was contested by Aberdeen and Rangers and was the second of three consecutive finals between the two clubs.

Rangers won the match 3–2 thanks to goals from Ally McCoist and Ian Ferguson.

== Match details ==
23 October 1988

Aberdeen	2–3	Rangers
Dodds 20', 63'		McCoist 14' (pen.), 86'; Ferguson 56'

Hampden Park, Glasgow
Attendance: 72,122
Referee: George Smith

ABERDEEN :
GK	Theo Snelders
RB	Stewart McKimmie
CB	Alex McLeish
CB	Willie Miller (c)
LB	David Robertson
RM	Bobby Connor
CM	Neil Simpson	(substituted off) 1'
CM	Jim Bett
LM	John Hewitt
CF	Charlie Nicholas
CF	Davie Dodds
Substitutes:
DF	Brian Irvine	(substituted on) 1'
Managers:
Alex Smith; Jocky Scott

RANGERS :
GK	Chris Woods
RB	Gary Stevens
CB	Richard Gough
CB	Terry Butcher (c)
LB	John Brown
RM	Mark Walters
CM	Ian Ferguson
CM	Ray Wilkins
LM	Neale Cooper
CF	Ally McCoist
CF	Kevin Drinkell
Substitutes:
DF	Stuart Munro
MF	Derek Ferguson
Manager:
Graeme Souness

== See also ==
- Aberdeen F.C.–Rangers F.C. rivalry
