= Mark Walters =

English footballer (born 1964)

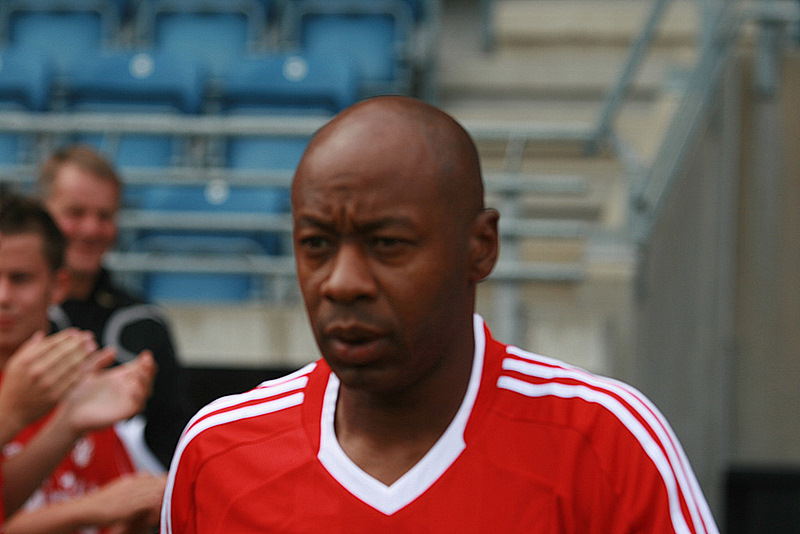
- Walters playing in a charity match in 2008.

Personal information
- Full name: Mark Everton Walters
- Date of birth: 2 June 1964 (age 62)
- Place of birth: Birmingham, England
- Height: 5 ft 10 in (1.78 m)
- Positions: Midfielder; left winger

Youth career
- 1980–1981: Aston Villa

Senior career*
Years	Team	Apps	(Gls)
1981–1987	Aston Villa	181	(39)
1987–1991	Rangers	106	(32)
1991–1996	Liverpool	94	(14)
1993–1994	→ Stoke City (loan)	9	(2)
1994–1995	→ Wolverhampton Wanderers (loan)	11	(3)
1996	Southampton	5	(0)
1996–1999	Swindon Town	112	(27)
1999–2002	Bristol Rovers	82	(13)
Total		600	(128)

International career
1980–1982	England Youth	9	(3)
1983–1986	England U21	9	(1)
1991	England B	1	(0)
1991	England	1	(0)
- * Club domestic league appearances and goals

Mark Everton Walters (born 2 June 1964) is an English former professional footballer who made 600 league appearances between 1981 and 2002.

A midfielder, Walters played top-flight football for Aston Villa, Liverpool and Southampton in England and for Rangers in Scotland, and played in the lower divisions of the Football League for Stoke City, Wolverhampton Wanderers, Swindon Town and Bristol Rovers. He was capped once by England.

== Club career ==
=== Aston Villa ===
Walters began his career as an apprentice at Aston Villa on leaving school in the summer of 1980, turning the professional a year later – just after Villa's Football League First Division title triumph – and made his competitive debut on 28 April 1982 in a 4–1 league defeat at home to Leeds United, two months after the departure of manager Ron Saunders – who had given Walters his first professional contract – and the promotion of assistant Tony Barton to the manager's seat. Walters was not included in Villa's squad for the final of the European Cup on 26 May 1982, which they won 1–0 against Bayern Munich, the West German champions. Walters, still only 18, made 22 league appearances in the 1982–83 campaign as Villa finished sixth. He scored once that season. He was firmly established as a regular player in the 1983–84 season, appearing 37 times in the league and scoring eight goals, though Villa had a disappointing season and finished 10th, with Tony Barton being sacked at the end of the season and replaced by Graham Turner.

On the opening day of the 1985–86 season Aston Villa were soundly beaten 4–0 by Manchester United prompting Walters to suggest to Graham Turner that he takes up a free role in the upcoming second game against Champions Liverpool. The move was initially a great success and Walters scored what he thought would be the winner, only for Jan Molby to equalise late on in a credible 2–2 draw. Walters scored a dynamic overhead kick in front of the Holte end after only 3 minutes in a 3–1 victory against Luton Town on August 31, 1985 . Walters, now highly rated as one of the country's most promising young players, remained in favour under Graham Turner, but Villa were in deep trouble throughout the 1985–86 season, finishing 16th and only avoiding relegation thanks to a late run of good form. Walters was restricted to 21 league games due to injury problems in 1986–87 as Villa were relegated in bottom place. Turner had been sacked in September and replaced by Billy McNeill, who in turn lost his job after relegation to be succeeded by Graham Taylor. Walters appeared in the first 24 games of Villa's ultimately successful quest to regain First Division status, scoring seven goals.

=== Rangers ===
During the late 1980s, Scottish club Rangers signed several English players, including internationals Terry Butcher, Trevor Steven, Gary Stevens, Chris Woods and Ray Wilkins. English clubs were banned from European competition, which meant that Rangers, who were managed by former Liverpool star Graeme Souness, were finding it easier to attract English players. Walters moved to Rangers for £500,000 on New Year's Eve 1987. Previously, black players had been a rarity in Scottish football. Queen's Park and Hearts had black players in the 19th century and Gil Heron played for Celtic in 1951. Rangers had also previously signed a black player, Walter Tull, but he died during the First World War before he could appear for Rangers.

Walters made his Rangers debut on 2 January 1988 in the Old Firm derby match with Celtic at Parkhead, a game which Rangers lost 2–0. The Celtic support subjected Walters to monkey noises and the throwing of bananas and other fruit. Walters himself later stated that his worst experience in Scotland was at Heart of Midlothian's Tynecastle, where the abuse was compounded by object-throwing. The abuse at Tynecastle was widely covered in the Scottish media, with commentator Archie Macpherson criticising it during the highlights package on Sportscene. Hearts chairman Wallace Mercer apologised to Walters.

Whilst at Ibrox, Walters was part of the side that won the Scottish Premier Division in 1989, 1990 and 1991 and the Scottish League Cup in 1988 and 1990, thus enjoying the most successful spell of his career in terms of trophies won.

=== Liverpool ===
Liverpool paid £1.25 million for Walters' services and he made his debut four days after signing, when he came on as a 65th-minute substitute for Steve McMahon in a 2–1 league win over Oldham Athletic at Anfield on 17 August 1991. His first goal for the club was an 88th-minute penalty in a 2–1 league win over Notts County at Meadow Lane on 7 September 1991.

His best display all season was in a match against Auxerre at Anfield in the Uefa Cup. Liverpool trailed 2–0 from the away leg but won their home match 3–0 with Walters netting a late winner after tormenting the French defence all night long. He remained a regular in the side and helped Liverpool to the 1992 FA Cup Final, although he was an unused substitute as his teammates beat 2nd Division Sunderland 2–0. However, he appeared in just 25 out of 42 league appearances for the Reds that season, scoring three goals as they finished sixth – the first time since 1981 that they had finished lower than champions or runners-up.

Walters scored Liverpool's first FA Premier League goal when he equalised in a 2–1 win over Sheffield United in August 1992. That same season he was also the first Liverpool player to score a Premiership hat-trick in a 4–0 win over Coventry City. He was their second highest scorer behind Ian Rush that season, scoring 11 goals in 34 league games, though the Reds finished sixth again. He lost his regular place in central midfield to youngster Jamie Redknapp in the 1993–94 season and never regained it. When Liverpool beat Bolton Wanderers 2–1 in the 1995 League Cup final, again an unused substitute, Walters was being used less as Roy Evans was employing three centre-halves with Rob Jones and Stig Inge Bjørnebye as wing-backs and three midfielders – Steve McManaman, Jamie Redknapp and John Barnes.

He had already been sent out on loan to Stoke City (9 games, 2 goals) and Wolverhampton Wanderers (11 games, 3 goals) during the 1993–94 and 1994–95 seasons, and thus it was not surprising that, after not appearing at all during the first half of the 1995–96 season, Walters was allowed to leave, joining Southampton on 18 January 1996 on a free transfer.

=== Southampton ===
Walters was signed by David Merrington in January 1996 to assist in the Saints' desperate fight against relegation from the Premiership. He made his debut as a substitute against Middlesbrough on 20 January 1996 and made a total of five league and four FA Cup appearances (with the Saints reaching the quarter-finals of the competition), but struggled to make any real impression with the side. His final appearance was in a dreadful match away to Queens Park Rangers, which Saints lost 3–0 meekly surrendering in a shoddy second half. At the end of the season, with Saints' Premiership status secured for another season, Walters was released, moving on to Swindon Town, as Graeme Souness – the man who signed him for Liverpool five years earlier – was arriving at Southampton to succeed the sacked Merrington.

=== Swindon Town ===
Walters joined Swindon Town on a free on 31 July 1996 and made his debut on 17 August in the 2–0 defeat to Norwich City at Carrow Road. His first goal for the Robins came via a 26th-minute penalty during the 2–1 league win over Tranmere Rovers on 14 September 1996.

At the County Ground, Walters was "sometimes brilliant, but at other times could be very frustrating". He never really featured in manager Jimmy Quinn's plans, and was eventually released to Bristol Rovers on a free transfer during the administration period, when it was decided Town could no longer afford his wages. Walters played a total of 126 matches for Swindon in which he scored 28 goals before he was released on 17 November 1999.

=== Bristol Rovers ===
Having been told that he was no longer required by Swindon the 35-year-old joined Ian Holloway's Bristol Rovers side on a free transfer. He spent three years at the Memorial Stadium playing 96 times and scoring 14 goals before he finally retired on 26 April 2002, five weeks before his 38th birthday. The penultimate season of his career saw Rovers slip into Division Three, and they struggled at this level too, finishing the season just one place – though many points – above relegated Halifax Town.

== England career ==
Walters represented England at schoolboy and under 21 levels before he earning his only full cap under Graham Taylor whilst he was with Rangers. It came on 3 June 1991 in the 1–0 friendly victory over New Zealand in Auckland.

== Coaching and media ==
Walters joined Coventry Preparatory School as a Saturday morning football coach for the four- to 11-year–olds in February 2003; he then became a member of staff in January 2006, coaching years three to eight and is also head coach of the under-14s at Aston Villa's academy. Walters is also heavily involved with groups aiming to eliminate racism in football. Walters went back to school and obtained teaching qualifications. He is Head of Languages at Aston Villa's academy.

Although now retired, Walters still plays in the Sky Sports masters football competitions for Rangers. He is also one of three honorary members of the Rangers Supporters Trust, along with Johnny Hubbard and Billy Simpson.

In 2021 Walters presented the documentary Mark Walters in the Footsteps on Andrew Watson which was aired on BBC Scotland.

== Personal life ==
Walters was born in Birmingham to the Nigerian footballer Lawrence Wabara, and a Jamaican mother who moved to England as part of the Windrush generation. His father walked out of the family when Mark was a child, and Walters was mostly raised by his mother, whose last name he uses. Walters is the half-brother of the professional boxer Pelé Reid, and the uncle of fellow footballers Simon Ford, and Reece Wabara.

== Career statistics ==
=== Club ===
Appearances and goals by club, season and competition
Club	Season	League			FA Cup		League Cup		Other^{[A]}		Total	
Club	Season	Division	Apps	Goals	Apps	Goals	Apps	Goals	Apps	Goals	Apps	Goals
Aston Villa	1981–82	First Division	1	0	0	0	0	0	0	0	1	0
Aston Villa	1982–83	First Division	22	1	3	1	0	0	2	1	27	3
Aston Villa	1983–84	First Division	37	8	2	0	5	2	4	1	48	11
Aston Villa	1984–85	First Division	36	10	1	0	2	0	0	0	39	10
Aston Villa	1985–86	First Division	40	10	4	0	9	3	0	0	53	13
Aston Villa	1986–87	First Division	21	3	2	0	3	1	2	0	28	4
Aston Villa	1987–88	Second Division	24	7	0	0	3	0	1	0	28	7
Aston Villa	Total		181	39	12	1	22	6	9	2	224	48
Rangers	1987–88	Scottish Premier Division	18	7	3	1	0	0	0	0	21	8
Rangers	1988–89	Scottish Premier Division	31	8	8	3	5	5	4	1	48	17
Rangers	1989–90	Scottish Premier Division	27	5	2	1	5	5	2	1	36	12
Rangers	1990–91	Scottish Premier Division	30	12	2	1	3	2	4	0	39	15
Rangers	Total		106	32	15	6	13	12	10	2	144	52
Liverpool	1991–92	First Division	24	3	3	0	4	2	5	1	36	6
Liverpool	1992–93	Premier League	32	11	1	0	5	2	4	0	42	13
Liverpool	1993–94	Premier League	17	0	1	0	2	0	0	0	19	0
Liverpool	1994–95	Premier League	18	0	4	0	1	0	0	0	23	0
Liverpool	Total		94	14	9	0	12	4	9	1	124	19
Stoke City (loan)	1993–94	First Division	9	2	0	0	0	0	0	0	9	2
Wolverhampton Wanderers (loan)	1994–95	First Division	11	3	0	0	0	0	0	0	11	3
Southampton	1995–96	Premier League	5	0	4	0	0	0	0	0	9	0
Swindon Town	1996–97	First Division	27	7	1	0	4	1	0	0	32	8
Swindon Town	1997–98	First Division	34	6	1	1	2	0	0	0	37	7
Swindon Town	1998–99	First Division	38	10	2	1	2	0	0	0	42	11
Swindon Town	1999–2000	First Division	13	2	0	0	2	1	0	0	15	3
Swindon Town	Total		112	25	4	2	10	2	0	0	126	29
Bristol Rovers	1999–2000	Second Division	30	9	0	0	0	0	2	0	32	9
Bristol Rovers	2000–01	Second Division	26	4	1	0	5	0	1	0	33	4
Bristol Rovers	2001–02	Third Division	26	0	4	1	0	0	1	0	31	1
Bristol Rovers	Total		82	13	5	1	5	0	4	0	96	14
Career total			600	128	49	10	62	24	32	5	743	167

A. The "Other" column constitutes appearances and goals in the European Cup, FA Charity Shield, Football League Trophy, Full Members Cup and UEFA Cup Winners' Cup, UEFA Cup.

=== International ===
National team	Year	Apps	Goals
England	1991	1	0
Total		1	0

== Honours ==
Aston Yilla Youth

- FA Youth Cup: 1979–80

Aston Villa

- UEFA Super Cup: 1982
- Football League Second Division runner-up: 1987–88

Rangers

- Scottish Premier Division: 1988–89, 1989–90, 1990–91
- Scottish League Cup: 1988–89, 1990–91; runner-up: 1989–90
- Scottish Cup runner-up: 1988–89

Liverpool

- FA Cup: 1991–92
- Football League Cup: 1994–95
