= Ian Ferguson (footballer, born 1967) =

Scottish footballer (born 1967)

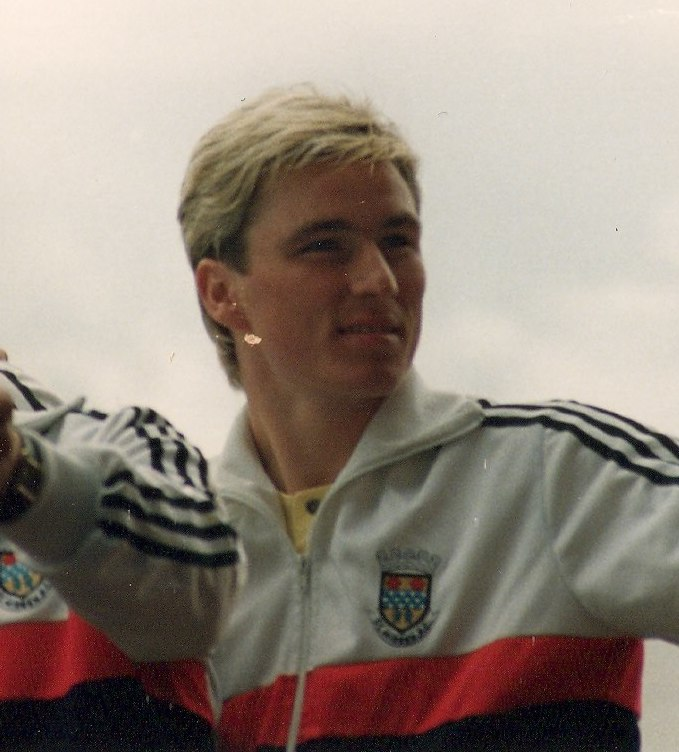
- Ferguson in 1987

Personal information
- Date of birth: 15 March 1967 (age 59)
- Place of birth: Glasgow, Scotland
- Height: 5 ft 10 in (1.78 m)
- Position: Midfielder

Youth career
- Clyde

Senior career*
Years	Team	Apps	(Gls)
1984–1986	Clyde	26	(4)
1986–1988	St Mirren	57	(10)
1988–2000	Rangers	236	(24)
2000–2002	Dunfermline Athletic	60	(2)
2002–2004	Northern Spirit	37	(3)
2005–2006	Central Coast Mariners	3	(0)
Total		416	(43)

International career
1986–1987	Scotland U21	6	(1)
1987	Scotland B	1	(0)
1988–1997	Scotland	9	(0)

Managerial career
- 2009–2010: North Queensland Fury
- 2010–2013: Perth Glory
- 2013–2017: Northern Fury
- 2021–2024: Stirling Macedonia
- 2025–2026: Dianella White Eagles
- * Club domestic league appearances and goals

Ian Ferguson (born 15 March 1967) is a Scottish football coach and retired professional player.

He started his career with Clyde, then moved to St Mirren in 1986, scoring the winning goal as the club won the 1987 Scottish Cup Final. Ferguson moved to Rangers in 1988 and stayed with the Ibrox club for 12 years, during which time he helped them win nine consecutive Scottish league championships. He has since been inducted to the club's Hall of Fame. He played for Dunfermline Athletic for two seasons, before emigrating to Australia where he played for Northern Spirit and Central Coast Mariners. Ferguson appeared in nine full international matches for Scotland.

Since retiring as a player, he has managed North Queensland Fury, Perth Glory, Northern Fury, Stirling Macedonia and Dianella White Eagles.

== Club career ==
=== St Mirren ===
Raised in the Parkhead area of Glasgow within a few blocks of Celtic Park, Ferguson grew up as a supporter of Rangers. He started his career with Clyde (he had an unsuccessful trial with Aberdeen in 1983), but was transferred to St Mirren for £60,000 in 1986. Aged 20, he scored the winning goal in the 1987 Scottish Cup Final, as St Mirren won 1–0 against Dundee United.

=== Rangers ===
Nine months after winning the Scottish Cup, he transferred to Rangers for £850,000 – still the record fee received by St Mirren – turning down offers from English clubs to become part of the strong squad being assembled at Ibrox by Graeme Souness. He is remembered as a key player of the era at the club, appearing 336 times and scoring 42 goals. Along with Ally McCoist and Richard Gough, he played a part in every season of Rangers' historic run of nine titles in a row between 1988–89 and 1996–97 under managers Souness and Walter Smith. Having picked up his first winner's medal a decade earlier, scoring in the 1988 Scottish League Cup Final, he also featured in the first title win with manager Dick Advocaat in 1998–99, and appeared as a substitute in the League Cup and Scottish Cup finals that season. His playing time became limited under Advocaat, and he moved on to Dunfermline Athletic in 2000.

He was given a testimonial match by Rangers, played against Sunderland on 21 July 1999.

=== Dunfermline Athletic ===
Ferguson spent two seasons in Fife, during which he helped newly promoted Dunfermline to keep their place in the top division (9th in 2000–01) and then improve it (6th in 2001–02). He then moved to Australia to see out the final years as a player and begin his managerial career.

== International career ==
Ferguson won nine international caps for Scotland, achieved at irregular intervals over a period of nine years. His last appearance was in a goalless draw against Estonia in February 1997. After the game, Ferguson was overheard by a microphone apparently swearing at the Scotland supporters. Ferguson apologised to the Scotland manager, Craig Brown, and he was included in the next squad.

== Managerial career ==
=== North Queensland Fury FC ===
On 15 September 2008, Ferguson was confirmed as the new manager of North Queensland FC leaving his post as assistant manager at Central Coast Mariners. He took up the post straight away in order to give the team the best preparation possible for their inaugural season in Australia's Hyundai A League. Ferguson lasted only one year with the Fury, when the club folded due to financial instability.

=== Perth Glory FC ===
In 2010 Ferguson moved to become the assistant to David Mitchell at the Perth Glory at the end of the 2009–10 season and becoming the coach on 12 October 2010 after David Mitchell resigned. On 27 March 2012 he signed a two-year contract extension with the club.

Ferguson successfully guided Perth Glory to their first A-League Grand Final in April 2012, after beating Minor A-League Premiers Central Coast Mariners in a penalty shootout at the Mariners' home ground in Gosford. However they lost the subsequent Grand Final 2–1 following a late comeback from Brisbane Roar who were awarded a controversial injury-time penalty.

Ferguson's contract was mutually terminated on 11 February 2013 as Perth Glory manager, after five straight losses and six hours of game time without a goal scored.

=== Northern Fury FC (NPL Queensland) ===
In 2013, Ferguson was announced as the Director of Football and Coaching at the Townsville NPL Queensland franchise Northern Fury FC.

On 16 February 2017, Ferguson resigned as Northern Fury manager, less than a fortnight from the beginning of the Fury's season. He was replaced by Paul Roncato.

=== Stirling Macedonia FC (WA National Premier League) ===
On 3 November 2020, Stirling Macedonia FC announced Ian Ferguson as the new first team coach.

Ferguson coached Stirling to promotion of the WA State League 1 and back into the top flight, where they immediately challenged for the title and became one of the top clubs in the NPL.

=== Dianella White Eagles ===
In July 2024, Ian Ferguson is the head coach of the Dianella White Eagles, leading them as State League Division One champions and return to NPL Western Australia for 2025 Season.

== Career statistics ==
=== International appearances ===
As of 05:30, 9 May 2019 (UTC)

Appearances and goals by national team and year
National team	Year	Apps	Goals
Scotland	1988	1	0
Scotland	1989	2	0
Scotland	1990	—	
Scotland	1991	—	
Scotland	1992	—	
Scotland	1993	3	0
Scotland	1994	2	0
Scotland	1995	—	
Scotland	1996	—	
Scotland	1997	1	0
Total		9	0

=== Managerial record ===
As of 9 February 2013

Team	Nat	From	To	Record				
Team	Nat	From	To	G	W	D	L	Win %
North Queensland Fury	(Australia)	15 September 2008	6 April 2010	27	8	8	11	29.63
Perth Glory	(Australia)	12 October 2010	9 February 2013	72	23	14	35	31.94
Total				99	31	22	46	31.31

== Honours ==
=== Player ===
St Mirren

- Scottish Cup: 1986–87

Rangers

- Scottish League (10): 1988–89, 1989–90, 1990–91, 1991–92, 1992–93, 1993–94, 1994–95, 1995–96, 1996–97, 1998–99
- Scottish Cup: 1992–93, 1995–96, 1998–99; runner-up 1988–89, 1993–94
- Scottish League Cup: 1988–89, 1990–91, 1992–93, 1993–94, 1998–99

=== Manager ===
Perth Glory

- A-League: runner-up 2011–12

Quinns FC

- SLD2 Western Australia: State League Division 2 Winner 2019

Stirling Macedonia

- NPL Western Australia: Top 4 Final winner 2023
