= Stuart Munro =

Scottish footballer

Personal information
- Full name: Stuart David Munro
- Date of birth: 15 September 1962 (age 64)
- Place of birth: Falkirk, Scotland
- Position: Defender

Senior career*
Years	Team	Apps	(Gls)
1979–1980	Bo'ness United	?	(?)
1980–1981	St Mirren	1	(0)
1982–1984	Alloa Athletic	60	(5)
1984–1991	Rangers	179	(3)
1991–1992	Blackburn Rovers	1	(0)
1992–1996	Bristol City	94	(0)
1995–1996	Falkirk	13	(0)
1996–1997	St Mirren	26	(1)
1997	Blacktown City	3	(0)
1997–1998	Sydney United	21	(0)

International career
1990	Scotland B	2	(0)
1990	SFA (SFL centenary)	1	(0)

Managerial career
- 1998–1999: Gippsland Falcons
- 1999–2001: Carlton S.C.
- 2001–2002: Parramatta Power
- 2003–2004: South Melbourne FC
- 2005–2008: Oakleigh Cannons
- 2009–2011: Dandenong Thunder
- 2011–2013: Perth Glory assistant
- 2013: Dandenong Thunder
- 2015: Dandenong Thunder
- 2016: Southern United
- 2017: Dandenong City
- 2019: Melbourne Knights
- * Club domestic league appearances and goals

Stuart David Munro (born 15 September 1962 in Falkirk) is a Scottish former professional football player, who is best known for his time with Rangers.

Munro was signed from Alloa Athletic and made his top team debut for the Rangers against Dundee on 25 February 1984, aged 21. The game ended in a 3–1 win. He played a further six seasons before with Rangers before being sold to Blackburn Rovers for £350,000.

He emigrated to Australia at the end of his career, appearing for Sydney United in the National Soccer League in what would be his final season of professional football.

Upon retirement, he followed a coaching path, taking the reins at NSL clubs Gippsland Falcons, Carlton, Parramatta Power and South Melbourne.

With the end of that competition, Munro remained in Melbourne and was manager at Oakleigh Cannons from 2005 to 2008. Following the 2008 season he was appointed manager at Dandenong Thunder where he remained until 2011 when he was appointed assistant manager to his former Rangers teammate Ian Ferguson at Perth Glory. Munro spent 3 season as assistant at Perth Glory. He returned to the Thunder as manager in 2013 before taking on the role of technical director for the 2014 season. Munro once again took on the role as manager in 2015 but that season saw the club relegated from the Victorian top-flight. After leaving his role at Dandenong, Munro was appointed as the inaugural manager for newly founded Women's NPL Victoria club Southern United. At the end of the 2016 season Stuart was poached by Dandenong City for the 2017 NPL2 season. In 2019 he was appointed as head coach of Melbourne Knights ahead of the 2020 season.

== Honours ==
=== Player ===
Rangers

- Scottish Premier Division: 1986–87, 1988–89, 1989–90, 1990–91
- Scottish Cup: Runners-up 1988–89
- Scottish League Cup: 1986–87, 1987–88, 1988–89, 1990–91
  - Runners-up 1989–90

=== Manager ===
Oakleigh Cannons

- VPL Minor Premiership: 2006

Dandenong Thunder

- VPL Minor Premiership: 2009

Individual

- Victorian Coach of the Year: 2006, 2009
