= Charlie Gough =

Scottish footballer

Personal information
- Full name: Charles Storrar Gough
- Date of birth: 21 May 1939
- Place of birth: Glasgow, Scotland
- Date of death: 3 April 2015 (aged 75)
- Place of death: Cape Town, South Africa
- Position: Left half

Senior career*
Years	Team	Apps	(Gls)
- Alton Town
1964–1965	Charlton Athletic	4	(0)
1965–1973	Highlands Park		
- * Club domestic league appearances and goals

Charles Storrar Gough (21 May 1939 – 3 April 2015) was a Scottish professional footballer who played four league games in England for Charlton Athletic in the 1964–65 season. Gough also played for Alton Town in England and Highlands Park in South Africa. He served in the Parachute Regiment of the British Army. He died on 3 April 2015, aged 75. His son is fellow player Richard Gough.
