= Trevor Steven =

English association football player

Personal information
- Full name: Trevor McGregor Steven
- Date of birth: 21 September 1963 (age 63)
- Place of birth: Berwick-upon-Tweed, England
- Positions: Right midfielder; winger

Senior career*
Years	Team	Apps	(Gls)
1980–1983	Burnley	74	(11)
1983–1989	Everton	210	(48)
1989–1991	Rangers	55	(6)
1991–1992	Marseille	28	(3)
1992–1997	Rangers	77	(10)
Total		444	(78)

International career
1982	England Youth	1	(0)
1984	England U21	2	(0)
1985–1992	England	36	(4)
- * Club domestic league appearances and goals

Trevor McGregor Steven (born 21 September 1963) is an English former professional footballer who played as a right-sided midfielder. He progressed through the ranks at Burnley, making his debut in 1981 regularly scoring over the next two seasons. Everton boss Howard Kendall, who was building a new team based on youth, decided to make a bid for him. He became known as a member of the successful Everton side of the 1980s and went on to be part of the Rangers '9-in-a-row' team. Steven was also successful with France's Marseille and gained 36 international caps for England. He works as a presenter for RTÉ Sport in Ireland.

== Club career ==
=== Burnley ===
Steven began his career with Burnley upon leaving school in the summer of 1980, and broke into the first team on 14 April 1981 when he made his debut as substitute in a 4–2 win over Huddersfield Town at Turf Moor. During the 1981–82 season, whilst still a teenager, his first appearance in the starting XI came at Bristol Rovers in September. Steven then went on to score three goals in 36 league games to help Burnley win promotion to the Second Division as Third Division champions. He managed eight goals in the 1982–83 season, but was unable to prevent Burnley from going straight back down to the Third Division.

=== Everton ===
Burnley accepted £300,000 for the 19-year-old Steven who joined Everton in the summer of 1983. He made his debut at the beginning of the following season, which proved a watershed campaign for Kendall's men. Despite finishing in 7th position in the Football League Championship, the season – and Kendall's job – was saved by two excellent cup runs. Steven was not selected by Kendall for the 1984 Football League Cup Final (a defeat to local rivals Liverpool after a replay), but by the time Everton lined back up at Wembley for the 1984 FA Cup Final two months later, he was in the team. Watford were the opponents, and Steven played his part in the second goal of Everton's 2–0 success. As he ventured down the flank, Steven sent in an early, high and very awkward ball towards the Watford penalty area, which Everton centre forward Andy Gray and Watford goalkeeper Steve Sherwood challenged for together. Though Sherwood seemed to get two hands on the ball, Gray's challenge certainly involved contact with his head and the goal was given. Steven had played his part and an FA Cup medal was his.

The following season, Steven further established his right-flank partnership with full back Gary Stevens, which was a strong and creative link-up. Kendall had completed his team-building process and Everton went from strength to strength, winning the First Division title for the first time in 15 years and reaching the FA Cup final again. Steven established himself as one of the best midfield players in Europe with his ability to take players on with his attacking skills combined with defensive duties when needed. The domestic "double" chances evaporated when Manchester United, despite being down to ten men, won at Wembley in extra time, but there was consolation for Everton when they defeated Rapid Vienna 3–1 in the final of the European Cup Winners' Cup in Rotterdam. Steven scored the second goal with a close-range volley after Rapid failed to clear a corner. He had also scored a crucial goal in the semi-final against Bayern Munich. In the league, he managed 12 goals from 40 games and was among their top scorers.

Next season, Everton again challenged for First Division and FA Cup honours but were unable to compete in Europe due to the post-Heysel Stadium disaster ban on English clubs. Everton ended the season without a trophy – they lost the League title to Liverpool on the last day of the season, and then Steven suffered FA Cup heartbreak for a consecutive season when Liverpool beat Everton 3–1 at Wembley.

A year later he enjoyed another title triumph as Everton finished as champions with Steven scoring 14 goals – the most league goals he scored in a season for the club. In 1988 his right flank partner Stevens left Everton to join Rangers in Scotland and Steven struggled to form a similar telepathy with replacement Neil McDonald. Everton ended the season without a trophy – losing the 1989 FA Cup Final to Liverpool.

=== Rangers ===
Graeme Souness, then manager of Rangers, offered Steven the chance to pair up with his friend Gary Stevens and reform their partnership down the right. Offers came in from other big clubs, including Manchester United, where Alex Ferguson was rebuilding his midfield around Bryan Robson, but Steven chose Ibrox when he exited Goodison Park in the 1989 close season. His main reason for doing so seemed to be the attraction of European football, as the ban on English clubs was ongoing and Steven had been denied the chance to play in the European Cup with Everton as a consequence. So, after 299 appearances and 60 goals, he left Everton in a £1.5 million deal and went to Glasgow.

Despite being the latest in a sequence of high-profile England internationals signed by Souness, Steven's arrival at Ibrox was relatively low-key, principally because it coincided with the controversial signing of Mo Johnston – the first high-profile, established Roman Catholic player to be signed by Rangers in the post-war period. Steven rapidly became a solid member of the Rangers squad, securing a league championship in his first season, and another title plus the Scottish League Cup in the second.

=== Marseille and return to Rangers ===
In August 1991, Steven moved for £5.5 million – the joint-highest fee involving a British player at the time, shared with David Platt of Aston Villa, who had been transferred to Italian club Bari for the same amount a month earlier – to Olympique Marseille where he stayed for one season, winning the French league title.

However, his future in the south of France had looked uncertain within months of his arrival. In December 1991, it was reported that the financially troubled club were prepared to sell Steven back to Rangers to cut their heavy losses. However, he stayed with the club until the end of the season. Despite reports on 22 July 1992 that Steven had agreed to sign for English league champions Leeds United, he returned to Rangers four days later for a fee of £2.2million.

Steven's second period at Ibrox was undermined by a succession of minor injuries, although they were league champions in each of the next five seasons (one of them as treble winners and two as double winners) before Steven retired from playing in 1997. He was a regular player in the first of his seasons back at Ibrox, but managed just 11 appearances in the 1994–95 season (when Rangers won their seventh successive title and their fifth that Steven had been involved in) and with the arrival of Paul Gascoigne he managed only six league appearances. His final season, 1996–97, brought eight league appearances and one goal as Rangers matched Celtic's record of nine successive Scottish league titles.

== International career ==
A very successful season at club level for Steven was completed when, in February 1985, he was called up by England coach Bobby Robson to make his debut in a qualifier for the 1986 World Cup against Northern Ireland. He stayed in the side for the next three games, scoring his first goal in a friendly win over the Republic of Ireland and contributing to a brace of drawn qualifiers versus Romania and Finland.

When he was awarded his fifth cap against Italy at the beginning of a summer mini-tournament in North America, he was joined behind him by his Everton teammate Gary Stevens, therefore transferring an effective partnership to the international stage. However, Steven soon had a rival for the right flank as Robson began to explore various combinations for his wide men. Chris Waddle was a more flamboyant and explosive player than Steven, but Robson often preferred the consistency and team play of Steven on the right wing and he became a frequent choice as a result.

Steven scored his second England goal in a 5–0 thumping of the USA in Los Angeles at the conclusion of the summer tour. In January 1986 he scored the opening goal in a 4–0 win over Egypt in Cairo and continued to be selected as the World Cup neared, and was selected by Robson for the squad which would represent England in Mexico at the World Cup.

Robson preferred Waddle as his one orthodox wide man for the opening game against Portugal, but England played poorly and lost 1–0. No changes were made, despite this defeat, and England suffered a nervy and embarrassing goalless draw against Morocco, meaning they had to win their final group game or they were out. As a consequence, Steven got his World Cup chance as Robson ditched Waddle and went for the creative but disciplined pairing of Steven on the right and Steve Hodge on the left. It paid dividends, as Steven combined down his flank with Stevens to set up an opening goal for Gary Lineker; Hodge then set up Lineker's second, and Steven delivered a corner which went uncleared, allowing Lineker to complete his hat-trick. Steven played as England thrust aside Paraguay in the second round but in the quarter-final, with England 2–0 down against Argentina, he was sacrificed midway through the second half by Robson to give John Barnes his first run-out. Barnes single-handedly destroyed the Argentine defence but could only set up one goal and England were eliminated.

The next year he played a full part in a robust qualification campaign for the 1988 European Championships. By the time the tournament came around in the summer of 1988, Steven had a healthy 22 caps. The competition was a major disappointment, as England succumbed to tiredness to lose all three of their group games. Steven missed the opening defeat to the Republic of Ireland, but played in the 3–1 defeat by the Netherlands when Dutch centre forward Marco van Basten scored a memorable hat-trick. Steven stayed in the team for the final group game in the 3–1 defeat against USSR, although he was unlucky not to give England the lead when his header hit the underside of the crossbar when the score was still 1–1.

His form at Rangers persuaded Bobby Robson to retain him in the England squad. After playing in the end-of-season Rous Cup against Scotland, which England won, Steven made the final cut of 22 players for the 1990 FIFA World Cup tournament in Italy when Robson announced it, edging out David Rocastle. He did not feature in the tournament until the quarter-final against Cameroon when he came on as a substitute as England found themselves behind in the second half. He did the same thing again in the semi-final – again replacing his Rangers teammate Terry Butcher – as England chased the game against West Germany, ultimately forcing a draw and a penalty shootout. Steven did not take a penalty and England went out. He finally started a game when Robson put him in the team for the showpiece third-place play-off against Italy, which England lost 2–1.

Robson's successor Graham Taylor selected Steven for a number of friendly internationals but he did not play in any of the qualifying games for the 1992 European Championships. England later suffered a major injury crisis prior to the tournament in Sweden and Taylor put Steven in his squad, selecting him on the right flank in an England side which looked unrecognisable from the one which had reached the World Cup semi-final two summers earlier. Steven played in the group games against Denmark and France, both of which ended goalless, but was dropped for the final game against the hosts on 14 June 1992, in which England lost 2–1, ensuring their elimination. Steven's England career ended there, with 36 caps at senior level and four goals.

== Media work ==
Since he retired, Steven has worked in the media. In his early career, he worked as a co-commentator for the BBC during their coverage of the 2002 FIFA World Cup.

Steven now acts as a pundit for RTÉ Sport in Ireland, having covered the 2006 FIFA World Cup in Germany for the broadcaster. He is also a regular contributor to RTÉ's coverage of the Premier League and UEFA Champions League, acting both as analyst and co-commentator. He contributed to RTÉ Sport's coverage of the 2010 FIFA World Cup and the 2014 FIFA World Cup.

== Charity work ==
Backed by local sports stars, Trevor Steven is spearheading a new charity encouraging construction workers to talk about mental health. The Mindflow initiative has been endorsed by football legends Gary Lineker, Robbie Fowler, Stuart Pearce, Ally McCoist, Peter Reid and Viv Anderson.

The initiative was launched at the National Football Museum in Manchester earlier this month, and attended by Mindflow Ambassadors: Manchester City’s David White, Paul Dickov and Paul Lake, Tottenham Hotspur’s Paul Stewart, and Sheffield United’s Curtis Woodhouse. Through Mindflow’s ‘Talk Football Talk Mental Health’ programme, current and ex-football players will visit construction sites to deliver mental health awareness sessions, encourage conversation, and recruit volunteers from each session to train as mental health first aiders. The Ambassadors have all publicly shared their challenges around mental health and have firsthand experience to support the construction industry.

== Career statistics ==
=== International goals ===
Scores and results list England's goal tally first, score column indicates score after each Steven goal.

List of international goals scored by Trevor Steven
No.	Date	Venue	Opponent	Score	Result	Competition
1	26 March 1985	Wembley Stadium, London, England	Republic of Ireland		2–1	Friendly
2	16 June 1985	Memorial Coliseum, Los Angeles, US	United States		5–0	Friendly
3	29 January 1986	International Stadium, Cairo, Egypt	Egypt		4–0	Friendly
4	29 April 1992	Lenin Central Stadium, Moscow, CIS	CIS		2–2	Friendly

== Honours ==
Burnley

- Football League Third Division: 1981–82

Everton

- Football League First Division: 1984–85, 1986–87
- FA Cup: 1983–84; runner-up: 1984–85, 1985–86, 1988–89
- FA Charity Shield: 1984, 1985, 1986 (shared), 1987
- UEFA Cup Winners' Cup: 1984–85
- Full Members' Cup runner-up: 1988–89

Rangers

- Scottish Premier Division: 1989–90, 1990–91, 1992–93, 1993–94, 1994–95, 1995–96, 1996–97
- Scottish League Cup: 1990–91, 1992–93, 1993–94; runner-up: 1989–90

Marseille

- Ligue 1: 1991–92
