= 1988–89 Scottish Cup =

Tournament details
- Country: Scotland

Final positions
- Champions: Celtic
- Runners-up: Rangers

Tournament statistics
- Top goal scorer: Ally McCoist (5)

The 1988–89 Scottish Cup was the 104th staging of Scotland's most prestigious football knockout competition. The Cup was won by Celtic who defeated Rangers in the final.

== First round ==
Home team	Score	Away team
Berwick Rangers (3)	1–1	Alloa Athletic (3)
East Fife (3)	4–1	Spartans (ESL)
East Stirlingshire (3)	1–0	Gala Fairydean (ESL)
Inverness Thistle (HL)	0–0	Dumbarton (3)
Montrose (3)	2–0	Arbroath (3)
Stranraer (3)	2–2	Stirling Albion (3)

=== Replays ===
Home team	Score	Away team
Dumbarton (3)	2–1	Inverness Thistle (HL)
Stirling Albion (3)	0–1	Stranraer (3)
Alloa Athletic (3)	2–1	Berwick Rangers (3)

== Second round ==
Home team	Score	Away team
Annan Athletic (ESL)	1–5	Queen's Park (3)
Coldstream (ESL)	1–1	Albion Rovers (3)
Cowdenbeath (3)	1–1	Stenhousemuir (3)
East Stirlingshire (3)	1–2	Montrose (3)
Elgin City (HL)	2–2	Dumbarton (3)
Forres Mechanics (HL)	1–1	Alloa Athletic (3)
Inverness Caledonian (HL)	1–1	Brechin City (3)
Stranraer (3)	2–1	East Fife (3)

=== Replays ===
Home team	Score	Away team
Albion Rovers	1–0	Coldstream (ESL)
Alloa Athletic (3)	2–0	Forres Mechanics (HL)
Brechin City (3)	2–1	Inverness Caledonian (HL)
Dumbarton (3)	4–0	Elgin City (HL)
Stenhousemuir (3)	3–2	Cowdenbeath (3)

== Third round ==
Home team	Score	Away team
Meadowbank Thistle (2)	2–0	Hamilton Academical (1)
Alloa Athletic (3)	3–1	Albion Rovers (3)
Celtic (1)	2–0	Dumbarton (3)
Clydebank (2)	2–1	Montrose (3)
Dundee (1)	1–2	Dundee United (1)
Dunfermline Athletic (2)	0–0	Aberdeen (1)
Falkirk (2)	1–1	Motherwell (1)
Forfar Athletic (2)	1–1	Clyde (2)
Hearts (1)	4–1	Ayr United (2)
Hibernian (1)	1–0	Brechin City (3)
Greenock Morton (2)	0–0	Airdrieonians (2)
Partick Thistle (2)	0–0	St Mirren (1)
Queen of the South (2)	2–2	Kilmarnock (2)
Queen's Park (3)	0–0	Stranraer (3)
Raith Rovers (2)	1–1	Rangers (1)
St Johnstone (2)	2–0	Stenhousemuir (3)

=== Replays ===
Home team	Score	Away team
Aberdeen (1)	3–1	Dunfermline Athletic (2)
Airdrieonians (2)	0–1	Greenock Morton (2)
Motherwell (1)	2–1	Falkirk (2)
Clyde (2)	0–1	Forfar Athletic (2)
Kilmarnock (2)	0–1	Queen of the South (2)
Rangers (1)	3–0	Raith Rovers (2)
St Mirren (1)	1–3	Partick Thistle (2)
Stranraer (3)	1–0	Queen's Park (3)

== Fourth round ==
Home team	Score	Away team
Aberdeen (1)	1–1	Dundee United (1)
Celtic (1)	4–1	Clydebank (2)
Hearts (1)	2–0	Partick Thistle (2)
Hibernian (1)	2–1	Motherwell (1)
Meadowbank Thistle (2)	0–1	Greenock Morton (2)
Queen of the South (2)	0–0	Alloa Athletic (3)
Rangers (1)	8–0	Stranraer (3)
St Johnstone (2)	2–1	Forfar Athletic (2)

=== Replays ===
Home team	Score	Away team
Dundee United (1)	1–1	Aberdeen (1)
Alloa Athletic (3)	4–2	Queen of the South (2)

==== Second Replays ====
Home team	Score	Away team
Dundee United (1)	1–0	Aberdeen (1)

== Quarter-finals ==
Home team	Score	Away team
Greenock Morton (2)	2–2	St Johnstone (1)
Rangers (1)	2–2	Dundee United (1)
Celtic (1)	2–1	Hearts (1)
Hibernian (1)	1–0	Alloa Athletic (3)

=== Replays ===
Home team	Score	Away team
Dundee United (1)	0–1	Rangers (1)
St Johnstone (1)	3–2	Greenock Morton (2)

== Semi-finals ==
15 April 1989

Rangers	0–0	St Johnstone

Celtic Park, Glasgow
Attendance: 47,374

16 April 1989

Celtic	3–1	Hibernian
Mick McCarthy; Mark McGhee; Andy Walker		Steve Archibald

Hampden Park, Glasgow
Attendance: 42,160

=== Replays ===
18 April 1989

Rangers	4–0	St Johnstone
Mark Walters; Gary Stevens; Kevin Drinkell; Ally McCoist

Celtic Park, Glasgow
Attendance: 44,205

== Final ==
20 May 1989

Celtic	1 – 0	Rangers
Miller 42'

Hampden Park, Glasgow
Attendance: 72,069
Referee: Bob Valentine

== See also ==
- 1988–89 in Scottish football
- 1988–89 Scottish League Cup
