= 1999 Scottish Cup final =

1999 Scottish Cup Final
- Event: 1998–99 Scottish Cup
Rangers	Celtic
1	0
- Date: 29 May 1999
- Venue: Hampden Park, Glasgow
- Man of the Match: Lorenzo Amoruso
- Referee: Hugh Dallas
- Attendance: 52,670

The 1999 Scottish Cup Final was played on 29 May 1999, at Hampden Park in Glasgow and was the final of the 114th Scottish Cup. Celtic and Rangers contested the match, Rangers won the match 1–0, thanks to Rod Wallace's 48th-minute goal where he shot left footed into the corner of the goal when the ball broke to him in the box four yards out. This was the first match at Hampden Park since the stadium was re-vamped.

== Match details ==
29 May 1999

Rangers	1 – 0	Celtic
Wallace 49'	Report

Hampden Park, Glasgow
Attendance: 52,670
Referee: Hugh Dallas

RANGERS:
GK	1	(Germany) Stefan Klos
DF	2	(Italy) Sergio Porrini	(substituted off) 77'
DF	3	(Italy) Lorenzo Amoruso (c)
DF	4	(Scotland) Colin Hendry
DF	5	(Australia) Tony Vidmar
MF	6	(Scotland) Neil McCann	(substituted off) 67'
MF	7	(Scotland) Derek McInnes
MF	8	(Netherlands) Giovanni Van Bronckhorst
MF	11	(Germany) Jörg Albertz
FW	9	(England) Rod Wallace
FW	10	(Argentina) Gabriel Amato	(substituted off) 89'
Substitutes:
DF	16	(Scotland) Scott Wilson	(substituted on) 89'
MF	17	(Scotland) Ian Ferguson	(substituted on) 67'
MF	18	(Russia) Andrei Kanchelskis	(substituted on) 77'
Manager:
(Netherlands) Dick Advocaat

CELTIC:
GK	1	(Scotland) Jonathan Gould
DF	2	(Scotland) Tom Boyd
DF	3	(France) Stéphane Mahé	(substituted off) 78'
DF	5	(England) Alan Stubbs
DF	4	(Italy) Enrico Annoni	(substituted off) 60'
MF	6	(Denmark) Morten Wieghorst
MF	8	(Scotland) Paul Lambert (c)
MF	9	(Sweden) Johan Mjällby
MF	11	(Netherlands) Regi Blinker
FW	10	(Slovakia) Ľubomír Moravčík
FW	7	(Sweden) Henrik Larsson
Substitutes:
GK	12	(Scotland) Stewart Kerr
MF	13	(Scotland) Phil O'Donnell	(substituted on) 78'
FW	14	(England) Tommy Johnson	(substituted on) 60'
Manager:
(Slovakia) Jozef Vengloš

== See also ==
- Old Firm
