= 1988–89 in Scottish football =

Premier Division champions
- Rangers

Division One champions
- Dunfermline Athletic

Division Two champions
- Albion Rovers

Scottish Cup winners
- Celtic

League Cup winners
- Rangers

Junior Cup winners
- Cumnock Juniors

Teams in Europe
- Aberdeen, Celtic, Dundee United, Heart of Midlothian, Rangers

Scotland national team
- 1990 World Cup qualification, Rous Cup
- ← 1987–88 1989–90 →

The 1988–89 season was the 92nd season of competitive football in Scotland.

== Notable events ==
Rangers regained their league title and retained the League Cup, but defeat by Celtic in the Scottish Cup final ended their hopes of a domestic treble.

Graeme Souness's acquisition of English players continued with the signing of Norwich City striker Kevin Drinkell and Everton defender Gary Stevens. For the title run-in, he also signed defender Mel Sterland from Sheffield Wednesday, only to sell him to Leeds United in the close season.

Hearts enjoyed the best European run out of all the Scottish clubs, reaching the quarter finals of the UEFA Cup, where they were narrowly beaten by the West German giants Bayern Munich.

Alex Smith and Jocky Scott took joint charge of Aberdeen for the 1988–89 season following the departure of Ian Porterfield after less than two years in charge, but were still unable to return to the club to the glory days of Alex Ferguson, as Rangers and Celtic collected all the major prizes once again.

== Scottish Premier Division ==
| Pos | Team | Pld | W | D | L | GF | GA | GD | Pts | Qualification or relegation |
|---|---|---|---|---|---|---|---|---|---|---|
| 1 | Rangers (C) | 36 | 26 | 4 | 6 | 62 | 26 | +36 | 56 | Qualification for the European Cup first round |
| 2 | Aberdeen | 36 | 18 | 14 | 4 | 51 | 25 | +26 | 50 | Qualification for the UEFA Cup first round |
| 3 | Celtic | 36 | 21 | 4 | 11 | 66 | 44 | +22 | 46 | Qualification for the Cup Winners' Cup first round |
| 4 | Dundee United | 36 | 16 | 12 | 8 | 44 | 26 | +18 | 44 | Qualification for the UEFA Cup first round |
| 5 | Hibernian | 36 | 13 | 9 | 14 | 37 | 36 | +1 | 35 | Qualification for the UEFA Cup first round |
| 6 | Heart of Midlothian | 36 | 9 | 13 | 14 | 35 | 42 | −7 | 31 | |
| 7 | St Mirren | 36 | 11 | 7 | 18 | 39 | 55 | −16 | 29 | |
| 8 | Dundee | 36 | 9 | 10 | 17 | 34 | 48 | −14 | 28 | |
| 9 | Motherwell | 36 | 7 | 13 | 16 | 35 | 44 | −9 | 27 | |
| 10 | Hamilton Academical (R) | 36 | 6 | 2 | 28 | 19 | 76 | −57 | 14 | Relegation to the 1989–90 Scottish First Division |

Source: Statto
Rules for classification: 1) points; 2) goal difference; 3) number of goals scored.
(C) Champions; (R) Relegated

Champions: Rangers
Relegated: Hamilton Academical

== Scottish League Division One ==
| Pos | Team | Pld | W | D | L | GF | GA | GD | Pts | Promotion or relegation |
|---|---|---|---|---|---|---|---|---|---|---|
| 1 | Dunfermline Athletic (C, P) | 39 | 22 | 10 | 7 | 60 | 36 | +24 | 54 | Promotion to the Premier Division |
| 2 | Falkirk | 39 | 22 | 8 | 9 | 71 | 37 | +34 | 52 | |
| 3 | Clydebank | 39 | 18 | 12 | 9 | 80 | 55 | +25 | 48 | |
| 4 | Airdrieonians | 39 | 17 | 13 | 9 | 66 | 44 | +22 | 47 | |
| 5 | Morton | 39 | 16 | 9 | 14 | 46 | 46 | 0 | 41 | |
| 6 | St Johnstone | 39 | 14 | 12 | 13 | 51 | 42 | +9 | 40 | |
| 7 | Raith Rovers | 39 | 15 | 10 | 14 | 50 | 52 | −2 | 40 | |
| 8 | Partick Thistle | 39 | 13 | 11 | 15 | 57 | 58 | −1 | 37 | |
| 9 | Forfar Athletic | 39 | 10 | 16 | 13 | 52 | 56 | −4 | 36 | |
| 10 | Meadowbank Thistle | 39 | 13 | 10 | 16 | 45 | 50 | −5 | 36 | |
| 11 | Ayr United | 39 | 13 | 9 | 17 | 56 | 72 | −16 | 35 | |
| 12 | Clyde | 39 | 9 | 16 | 14 | 40 | 52 | −12 | 34 | |
| 13 | Kilmarnock (R) | 39 | 10 | 14 | 15 | 47 | 60 | −13 | 34 | Relegation to the Second Division |
| 14 | Queen of the South (R) | 39 | 2 | 8 | 29 | 38 | 99 | −61 | 12 | Relegation to the Second Division |

Source: RSSSF and statto
Rules for classification: 1) points; 2) goal difference; 3) number of goals scored.
(C) Champions; (P) Promoted; (R) Relegated

Promoted: Dunfermline Athletic
Relegated: Kilmarnock, Queen of the South

== Scottish League Division Two ==
| Pos | Team | Pld | W | D | L | GF | GA | GD | Pts | Promotion |
|---|---|---|---|---|---|---|---|---|---|---|
| 1 | Albion Rovers (C, P) | 39 | 21 | 8 | 10 | 65 | 48 | +17 | 50 | Promotion to the First Division |
| 2 | Alloa Athletic (P) | 39 | 17 | 11 | 11 | 66 | 48 | +18 | 45 | Promotion to the First Division |
| 3 | Brechin City | 39 | 15 | 13 | 11 | 58 | 49 | +9 | 43 | |
| 4 | Stirling Albion | 39 | 15 | 12 | 12 | 64 | 55 | +9 | 42 | |
| 5 | East Fife | 39 | 14 | 13 | 12 | 55 | 54 | +1 | 41 | |
| 6 | Montrose | 39 | 15 | 11 | 13 | 54 | 55 | −1 | 41 | |
| 7 | Queen's Park | 39 | 10 | 18 | 11 | 50 | 49 | +1 | 38 | |
| 8 | Cowdenbeath | 39 | 13 | 14 | 12 | 48 | 52 | −4 | 40 | |
| 9 | East Stirlingshire | 39 | 13 | 11 | 15 | 54 | 58 | −4 | 37 | |
| 10 | Arbroath | 39 | 11 | 15 | 13 | 56 | 63 | −7 | 37 | |
| 11 | Stranraer | 39 | 12 | 12 | 15 | 58 | 63 | −5 | 36 | |
| 12 | Dumbarton | 39 | 12 | 10 | 17 | 45 | 55 | −10 | 34 | |
| 13 | Berwick Rangers | 39 | 10 | 13 | 16 | 50 | 59 | −9 | 33 | |
| 14 | Stenhousemuir | 39 | 9 | 11 | 19 | 44 | 59 | −15 | 29 | |

Rules for classification: 1) points; 2) goal difference; 3) number of goals scored.
(C) Champions; (P) Promoted

Promoted: Albion Rovers, Alloa Athletic

== Other honours ==
=== Cup honours ===
| Competition | Winner | Score | Runner-up |
|---|---|---|---|
| Scottish Cup 1988–89 | Celtic | 1 – 0 | Rangers |
| League Cup 1988–89 | Rangers | 3 – 2 | Aberdeen |
| Youth Cup | Celtic | 1 – 0 | Hibernian |
| Junior Cup | Cumnock Juniors | 1 – 0 | Ormiston Primrose |

=== Non-league honours ===
==== Senior ====
| Competition | Winner |
|---|---|
| Highland League 1988–89 | Peterhead |
| East of Scotland League | Gala Fairydean |
| South of Scotland League | Dalbeattie Star |

=== Individual honours ===
==== SPFA awards ====
| Award | Winner | Club |
|---|---|---|
| Players' Player of the Year | (Netherlands) Theo Snelders | Aberdeen |
| Young Player of the Year | (Scotland) Billy McKinlay | Dundee United |

==== SFWA awards ====
| Award | Winner | Club |
|---|---|---|
| Footballer of the Year | (Scotland) Richard Gough | Rangers |
| Manager of the Year | (Scotland) Graeme Souness | Rangers |

== Scottish clubs in Europe ==
Results for Scotland's participants in European competition for the 1988–89 season

=== Celtic ===
| Date | Venue | Opponents | Score | Competition | Celtic scorer(s) |
European Cup
| 7 September 1988 | Bozsik Stadion, Budapest (A) | Budapest Honvéd | 0–1 | EC1 | |
| 5 October 1988 | Celtic Park, Glasgow (H) | Budapest Honvéd | 4–0 | EC1 | Billy Stark, Andy Walker, Frank McAvennie, Mark McGhee |
| 26 October 1988 | Celtic Park, Glasgow (H) | Werder Bremen | 0–1 | EC2 | |
| 8 November 1988 | Weserstadion, Bremen (A) | Werder Bremen | 0–0 | EC2 | |

=== Dundee United ===
| Date | Venue | Opponents | Score | Competition | Dundee United scorer(s) |
|---|---|---|---|---|---|
| | UEFA Cup Winners' Cup | | | | |
| 6 September 1988 | Ta'Qali Stadium, Valletta (A) | Floriana | 0–0 | CWC1 | |
| 5 October 1988 | Tannadice, Dundee (H) | Floriana | 1–0 | CWC1 | Raphael Meade |
| 26 October 1988 | Tannadice, Dundee (H) | Dinamo Bucharest | 0–1 | CWC2 | |
| 9 November 1988 | Dinamo Stadium, Bucharest (A) | Dinamo Bucharest | 1–1 | CWC2 | Dave Beaumont |

=== Aberdeen ===
| Date | Venue | Opponents | Score | Competition | Aberdeen Scorer(s) |
UEFA Cup
| 7 September 1988 | Pittodrie, Aberdeen (H) | Dynamo Dresden | 0–0 | UC1 | |
| 5 October 1988 | Rudolf-Harbig-Stadion, Dresden (A) | Dynamo Dresden | 0–2 | UC1 | |

=== Heart of Midlothian ===
| Date | Venue | Opponents | Score | Competition | Hearts scorer(s) |
UEFA Cup
| 7 September 1988 | Richmond Park, Dublin (A) | St Patrick's Athletic | 2–0 | UC1 | Wayne Foster (pen.), Mike Galloway |
| 5 October 1988 | Tynecastle, Edinburgh (H) | St Patrick's Athletic | 2–0 | UC1 | Mike Galloway, Kenny Black |
| 26 October 1988 | Tynecastle, Edinburgh (H) | FK Austria Vienna | 0–0 | UC2 | |
| 9 November 1988 | Prater Stadion, Vienna (A) | FK Austria Vienna | 1–0 | UC2 | Mike Galloway |
| 23 November 1988 | Tynecastle, Edinburgh (H) | Velež Mostar | 3–0 | UC3 | Eamonn Bannon, Mike Galloway, John Colquhoun |
| 7 December 1988 | Bijeli Brijeg Stadium, Mostar (A) | Velež Mostar | 1–2 | UC3 | Mike Galloway |
| 28 February 1989 | Tynecastle, Edinburgh (H) | Bayern Munich | 1–0 | UCQF | Iain Ferguson |
| 14 March 1989 | Olympiastadion, Munich (A) | Bayern Munich | 0–2 | UCQF | |

=== Rangers ===
| Date | Venue | Opponents | Score | Competition | Rangers scorer(s) |
UEFA Cup
| 7 September 1988 | Ibrox Stadium, Glasgow (H) | GKS Katowice | 1–0 | UC1 | Mark Walters |
| 5 October 1988 | Ul. Bukowa, Katowice (A) | GKS Katowice | 4–2 | UC1 | Terry Butcher (2), Ian Durrant, Derek Ferguson |
| 26 October 1988 | Müngersdorfer Stadion, Cologne (A) | 1. FC Köln | 0–2 | UC2 | |
| 9 November 1988 | Ibrox Stadium, Glasgow (H) | 1. FC Köln | 1–1 | UC2 | Kevin Drinkell |

== Scotland national team ==
| Date | Venue | Opponents | Score | Competition | Scotland scorer(s) |
|---|---|---|---|---|---|
| 14 September | Ullevaal Stadion, Oslo (A) | Norway | 2–1 | WCQG5 | Paul McStay, Maurice Johnston |
| 19 October | Hampden Park, Glasgow (H) | Yugoslavia | 1–1 | WCQG5 | Maurice Johnston |
| 22 December | Stadio Renato Curi, Perugia (A) | Italy | 0–2 | Friendly | |
| 8 February | Tsirion Stadium, Limassol (A) | Cyprus | 3–2 | WCQG5 | Maurice Johnston, Richard Gough (2) |
| 8 March | Hampden Park, Glasgow (H) | France | 2–0 | WCQG5 | Maurice Johnston (2) |
| 26 April | Hampden Park, Glasgow (H) | Cyprus | 2–1 | WCQG5 | Maurice Johnston, Ally McCoist |
| 27 May | Hampden Park, Glasgow (H) | England | 0–2 | Rous Cup | |
| 30 May | Hampden Park, Glasgow (H) | Chile | 2–0 | Rous Cup | Alan McInally, Murdo MacLeod |

Key:

- (H) = Home match
- (A) = Away match
- WCQG5 = World Cup qualifying – Group 5
- F = Friendly

== See also ==
- 1988–89 Aberdeen F.C. season
- 1988–89 Dundee United F.C. season
- 1988–89 Rangers F.C. season
- Dubai Champions Cup
