= Chris Woods =

English football coach and former player

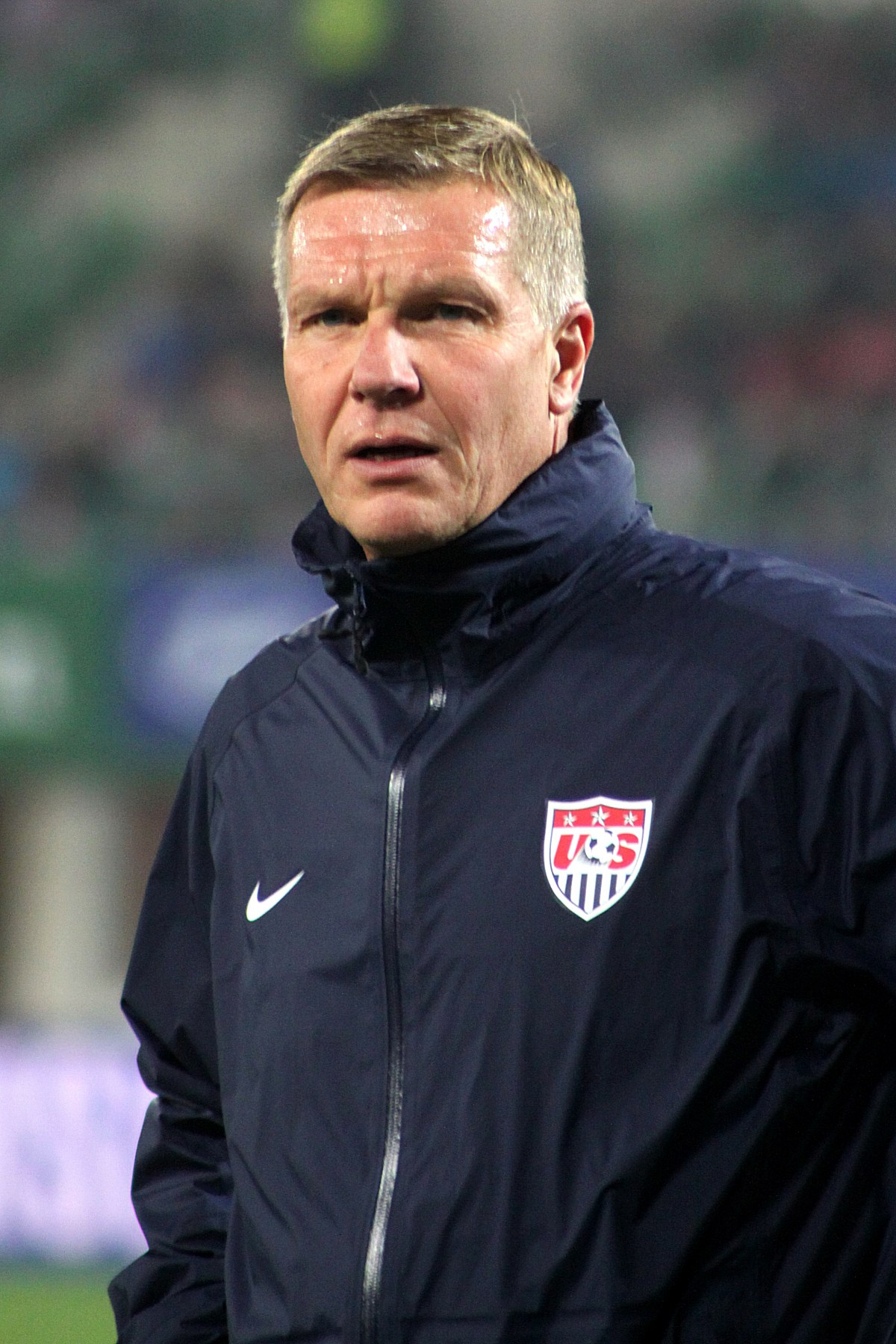
- Woods in 2013

Personal information
- Full name: Christopher Charles Eric Woods
- Date of birth: 14 November 1959 (age 67)
- Place of birth: Swineshead, Lincolnshire, England
- Height: 1.88 m (6 ft 2 in)
- Position: Goalkeeper

Team information
- Current team: Scotland (Goalkeeping coach)

Youth career
- 1975–1976: Nottingham Forest

Senior career*
Years	Team	Apps	(Gls)
1976–1979	Nottingham Forest	0	(0)
1979–1981	Queens Park Rangers	63	(0)
1981–1986	Norwich City	216	(0)
1986–1991	Rangers	173	(0)
1991–1996	Sheffield Wednesday	107	(0)
1995	→ Reading (loan)	5	(0)
1996	Colorado Rapids	23	(0)
1996	→ Southampton (loan)	4	(0)
1997	Sunderland	0	(0)
1997–1998	Burnley	12	(0)
Total		603	(0)

International career
1977–1978	England Youth	9	(0)
1979–1983	England U21	6	(0)
1984–1989	England B	2	(0)
1985–1993	England	43	(0)
- * Club domestic league appearances and goals

Christopher Charles Eric Woods (born 14 November 1959) is an English football coach and former professional footballer who is goalkeeping coach for the Scotland national team.

As a player, he was a goalkeeper who played in the Football League and Premier League for Nottingham Forest, Queens Park Rangers, Norwich City, Sheffield Wednesday, Reading, Southampton and Burnley. He also played in the Scottish Football League for Rangers and in Major League Soccer for the Colorado Rapids. He was an England international and was largely Peter Shilton's long-time understudy in the England team in the mid to late 1980s, finally claiming the number one shirt for himself after the 1990 World Cup. In all, he managed to accrue 43 caps in an eight-year international career.

Woods has been goalkeeper coach for Everton, the United States and Manchester United. He was most recently coaching at West Ham United.

== Club career ==
=== Nottingham Forest ===
When 17 years old, Woods joined Nottingham Forest as an apprentice in 1976, initially as back-up for John Middleton, then Peter Shilton. With Shilton cup-tied for the 1977–78 Football League Cup, having already played for Stoke City in that season's competition, Woods played every match as Forest reached the final, where they beat Liverpool in a replay, Woods keeping two clean sheets in the process. Shilton remained the club's first choice goalkeeper, and the 1977–78 League Cup games proved to be Woods' only senior appearances for the club as they went on to win the Football League, League Cup again, and European Cup.

=== Queens Park Rangers ===
Queens Park Rangers paid £250,000 for 19-year-old Woods in July 1979. As first choice at QPR, Woods made his Football League debut, playing 63 league games over the next two seasons.

=== Norwich City ===
In March 1981 Norwich signed him for £225,000. In 1985 Woods won his second League Cup final, beating Sunderland 1–0 at Wembley. Norwich were relegated at the end of that season. England coach Bobby Robson took Woods on a post-season tour of America. Woods won a second division championship medal the year after. In 2002, he was voted into the club's Hall of Fame.

=== Rangers ===
Graeme Souness signed Woods for Rangers in the summer of 1986 for £600,000. He was part of an influx of English talent brought in by Souness, which also included Terry Butcher and Graham Roberts. Woods won a Scottish Premier Division title and a Scottish League Cup medal in his first season. From November 1986 to January 1987 he set a British record by playing 1196 consecutive minutes of competitive football without conceding a goal. The run was ended at Ibrox on 31 January 1987 when Adrian Sprott scored the only goal for Hamilton Academical in the 70th minute of a Scottish Cup tie.

Woods won another Scottish League Cup winners medal with Rangers in 1987–88, although rivals Celtic won a league and Scottish Cup double. Rangers regained the league title in 1989. Woods missed half the season with an infection that affected his balance and vision. Woods won further Scottish league titles in 1989–90 and 1990–91. In the 1991 close season, new Rangers manager Walter Smith replaced Woods with Scottish international Andy Goram. This signing was made in part because UEFA had introduced a rule limiting foreign players, which meant that Rangers could only field three non-Scottish players in European matches.

=== Sheffield Wednesday ===
In August 1991, Woods signed for Trevor Francis at Sheffield Wednesday for £1.2 million. Wednesday had just won the League Cup and promotion to England's top tier.

Wednesday lost the 1993 Football League Cup Final 2–1 to Arsenal. A few weeks later Woods lost in the 1993 FA Cup Final. Wednesday again played Arsenal initially drawing 1–1. Arsenal's Andy Linighan's header made them the 2–1 winner in the closing seconds of extra time. Ironically, both Linighan and Woods were former Norwich players, with defeat in both finals costing Wednesday a place in Europe for 1993–94.

By the 1995–96 season Woods was out of favour at Wednesday to Kevin Pressman as first-choice goalkeeper. Woods had a short loan spell at Reading.

=== Colorado Rapids and Southampton loan ===
In 1996, he joined Colorado Rapids in the USA. In October 1996, Graeme Souness, now manager at Southampton, negotiated his loan from Colorado Rapids as cover for Dave Beasant, with a view to a permanent transfer. His second league appearance came in a 7–1 defeat at the hands of Everton, and in his fourth league appearance he broke his leg at Blackburn Rovers after which he returned to the US to recuperate.

=== Later career ===
He then returned to England for spells at Sunderland and Burnley. He retired from playing in 1998.

== International career ==
In the England squad Woods was once again Shilton's back-up. Woods debuted in a friendly against the USA in Los Angeles on 16 June 1985 while a Norwich City player. He was rarely left out of an England squad again over the next five years. Woods went to the 1986 World Cup in Mexico but did not play. England went out in the quarter-finals.

When at Rangers Woods received his second start in his fifth cap in a 2–0 Wembley win over Yugoslavia that inched England further towards 1988 European Championships qualification. Woods came on as a substitute for Shilton twice in 1987 and started two matches: a European Championships qualifier against Turkey and a goalless draw against Scotland at Hampden Park in the Rous Cup. Two more starts followed in the subsequent season prior to the European Championships in Germany.

England suffered two defeats in the opening brace of group games at the 1988 European Championships, and therefore Robson could afford to rest Shilton for the third and final group match, against the USSR, which had been rendered meaningless. Woods therefore played his first match in a competitive finals, his 13th in total, conceding three times in a 3–1 defeat.

By now, another goalkeeper had emerged as a potential successor to the ageing Shilton, with QPR's David Seaman receiving a first cap in a draw against Saudi Arabia in Riyadh. However, Woods was still regarded by Robson as his primary understudy for Shilton, who had, by now, earned his 100th cap and was about to break Bobby Moore's record of 108. Also on the scene was Dave Beasant, who won two caps as a sub as Robson checked out other goalkeepers, but Woods remained Robson's first choice if ever Shilton was unable to play. As all this went on, England qualified for the 1990 World Cup in Italy.

Robson chose Woods and Seaman as Shilton's understudies in the initial squad, but days before a hand injury to David Seaman forced Bobby Robson to drop Seaman and replace him with Beasant. England went to the semi-finals, where they lost on penalties to West Germany.

Woods did not play in the World Cup, Robson choosing to keep Shilton in the side for his 125th and final cap for England in the third place play-off match against Italy after their semi-final defeat. Robson quit after the tournament and successor Graham Taylor instantly installed Woods as his number one. By summer 1991, Woods had accumulated 24 caps as England made steady progress through their qualification for the 1992 European Championships, unbeaten in six matches with three clean sheets and conceding only three goals.

He went to the 1992 European Championships as England's first-choice keeper and kept clean sheets in his first two matches against Denmark and France. England did not score in either, so victory was crucial against hosts Sweden in the last group match. Sweden won 2–1, however, so England were eliminated and Woods had suffered major disappointment in his first (and ultimately his only) tournament as England's number-one keeper.

He stayed in the side the following year as England stuttered in their qualification campaign for the 1994 World Cup. Woods conceded a crucial equaliser from a long-range shot from Kjetil Rekdal in a 1–1 home draw with Norway and an 85th-minute penalty from Peter van Vossen in a 2–2 home draw with the Netherlands. In June 1993 England lost a crucial match in Oslo against Norway. Then, after a defeat against the USA in Boston during a summer tour in 1993, Taylor dropped Woods and, after trying two other keepers, installed Seaman in the side. Woods' 43-cap international career ended where it began, with a game against the US, although he was an unused substitute for the following four internationals.

== Coaching career ==
Woods took up a coaching position under Walter Smith at Everton in 1998, where he was tasked with the development of the club's goalkeepers. In July 2013 Woods left Everton to take the goalkeeping coach position at Manchester United, following the same move by first team manager David Moyes. Woods retained his position when Moyes was sacked, in April 2014, but was replaced by Frans Hoek, when Moyes' permanent successor, Louis van Gaal, was appointed. In June 2015 he became goalkeeping coach at West Ham United. He left the role in May 2018 following the appointment of new manager, Manuel Pellegrini.

Parallel to being a club coach, in 2011 Woods was employed by the United States national team, linking up with Everton goalkeeper Tim Howard. He took a similar position with the Scotland national team in August 2021.

== Honours ==
Nottingham Forest

- Football League Cup: 1977–78
- European Cup: 1978–79

Norwich City

- Football League Cup: 1984–85

Rangers

- Scottish Premier Division: 1986–87, 1988–89, 1989–90, 1990–91
- Scottish League Cup: 1986–87, 1987–88, 1990–91

Sheffield Wednesday

- FA Cup runner-up: 1992–93
- Football League Cup runner-up: 1992–93

Individual

- Norwich City Player of the Year: 1983–84
- PFA Team of the Year: 1985–86 Second Division
- Norwich City Hall of Fame inductee: 2003
