= 1990–91 Scottish League Cup =

Tournament details
- Country: Scotland

Final positions
- Champions: Rangers
- Runners-up: Celtic

Tournament statistics
- Top goal scorer: Kevin Gallacher (5)

The 1990–91 Scottish League Cup was the 45th staging of the Scotland's second most prestigious football knockout competition.

The competition was won by Rangers, who defeated Celtic 2–1 in the Final at Hampden Park.

== First round ==
Home team	Score	Away team
East Stirlingshire (3)	(p)2 – 2	Dumbarton (3)
Queen's Park (3)	(p)3 – 3	East Fife (3)
Stenhousemuir (3)	0–2	Cowdenbeath (3)
Montrose (3)	1–2	Queen of the South (3)
Stirling Albion (3)	1–2	Arbroath (3)
Stranraer (3)	4–3	Berwick Rangers (3)

== Second round ==
Home team	Score	Away team
Airdrieonians (2)	1–2	Stranraer (3)
Alloa Athletic (3)	0–3	Dundee United (1)
Brechin City (2)	0–2	Hamilton Academical (2)
Dunfermline Athletic (1)	4–0	Albion Rovers (2)
Forfar Athletic (2)	1–2	Raith Rovers (2)
Kilmarnock (2)	3–2	Clydebank (2)
Motherwell (1)	4–3	Morton (2)
Queen of the South (3)	(p)2 – 2	Dundee (2)
Queen's Park (3)	1–2	Aberdeen (1)
Rangers (1)	5–0	East Stirlingshire (3)
St Johnstone (1)	0–2	Clyde (2)
Celtic (1)	4–0	Ayr United (2)
Cowdenbeath (3)	0–2	Heart of Midlothian (1)
Falkirk (2)	1 – 1(p)	Partick Thistle (2)
Meadowbank Thistle (2)	0–1	Hibernian (1)
St Mirren (1)	1–0	Arbroath (3)

== Third round ==
Home team	Score	Away team
Dunfermline Athletic (1)	1–2	Queen of the South (3)
Motherwell (1)	2–0	Clyde (2)
Partick Thistle (2)	1–3	Dundee United (1)
Rangers (1)	1–0	Kilmarnock (2)
Aberdeen (1)	4–0	Stranraer (3)
Hamilton Academical (2)	0–1	Celtic (1)
Raith Rovers (2)	1–0	Hibernian (1)
St Mirren (1)	0–1	Heart of Midlothian (1)

== Quarter-finals ==
4 September 1990

Dundee United (1)	2–0	Motherwell (1)

Tannadice Park, Dundee

4 September 1990

Rangers (1)	6–2	Raith Rovers (2)

Ibrox Park, Glasgow

5 September 1990

Aberdeen (1)	3–0	Heart of Midlothian (1)

Pittodrie Stadium, Aberdeen

5 September 1990

Celtic (1)	2–1	Queen of the South (3)

Celtic Park, Glasgow

== Semi-finals ==
25 September 1990

Celtic (1)	2–0	Dundee United (1)

Hampden Park, Glasgow

26 September 1990

Rangers (1)	1–0	Aberdeen (1)

Hampden Park, Glasgow

== Final ==
28 October 1990

Rangers (1)	2–1 (a.e.t.)	Celtic (1)
Gough; Walters		Elliott

Hampden Park, Glasgow
Attendance: 62,817
Referee: Jim McCluskey
