= Richard Gough =

Scottish footballer

Personal information
- Full name: Charles Richard Gough
- Date of birth: 5 April 1962 (age 64)
- Place of birth: Stockholm, Sweden
- Height: 6 ft 0 in (1.83 m)
- Position: Defender

Youth career
- 1978–1979: Charlton Athletic
- 1979–1980: Wits University

Senior career*
Years	Team	Apps	(Gls)
1980–1986	Dundee United	165	(23)
1986–1987	Tottenham Hotspur	49	(2)
1987–1997	Rangers	294	(25)
1997	Kansas City Wizards	17	(0)
1997–1998	Rangers	24	(1)
1998–1999	San Jose Clash	19	(2)
1999	→ Nottingham Forest (loan)	7	(0)
1999–2001	Everton	38	(1)
Total		613	(54)

International career
1983–1993	Scotland	61	(6)

Managerial career
- 2004–2005: Livingston
- * Club domestic league appearances and goals

Charles Richard Gough (born 5 April 1962) is a Scottish former professional footballer who played as a defender.

Gough played in the successful Dundee United team of the early 1980s, winning the Scottish league title in 1982–83 and reaching the European Cup semi-final in 1984. Gough joined Tottenham Hotspur in 1986 and captained them in the 1987 FA Cup Final. He then moved to Rangers and captained them to nine successive Scottish league titles. He subsequently had spells with Kansas City Wizards, Rangers again, San Jose Clash, Nottingham Forest (on loan) and Everton.

He won 61 international caps for Scotland and played in the finals of three major tournaments.

Gough had a brief spell as manager of Livingston. He is currently an ambassador for Rangers.

== Early life ==
Richard Gough was born in Stockholm, Sweden, to a Swedish mother. His father (former Charlton Athletic player Charlie Gough), was from Hillington in Glasgow. Richard's paternal grandfather was from Dennistoun. Gough's parents met when she worked in London as a nurse. The family relocated in 1965 to South Africa where Richard grew up. He attended King Edward VII and Highlands North High School in Johannesburg. He began his career playing with the Wits University club.

== Playing career ==
=== Club ===
Aged 15, Gough went to Ipswich Town before Gough signed for Charlton Athletic as an apprentice professional in July 1978, staying there a year. He returned to South Africa when enduring home-sickness play for Wits University for a brief period in 1979. He then had trials in Scotland with Rangers, Dundee United and Aberdeen. his trial with United was a reserve game away to Arbroath in which Walter Smith played left-back. Jim McLean signed Gough for Dundee United in February 1980. He played for Dundee United for six seasons finishing with 23 goals in 165 appearances. Gough helped them to the Scottish League title in 1982–83. Dundee United also reached the 1983–84 European Cup semi-final against Roma during his time at the club.

In 1986, Gough was sold to English First Division club Tottenham Hotspur for £750,000 He played for slightly over a year and captained the Tottenham team which lost to Coventry City in the 1987 FA Cup Final.

Gough returned to Scotland, joining Rangers early in the 1987–88 season, and became the first Scottish player to be transferred to a Scottish team for over £1,000,000. His debut was at Tannadice Park, in a defeat against former club Dundee United. He was named the SFWA Footballer of the Year in 1988–89. Gough remained at Ibrox until 1997, captaining the side that achieved nine consecutive League titles. He won 9 league titles, 3 Scottish Cups and 6 League Cups at Rangers. In all, he played 427 games with Rangers, scoring 37 goals.

In May 1997, Gough moved to Kansas City Wizards, in the United States' nascent professional league, Major League Soccer. In October 1997, he returned to Rangers due to injury issues at Ibrox. He resumed his MLS career with the San Jose Clash in 1998. He played 36 games in total in MLS, scored 2 goals and was named in the MLS Best XI for his 1997 season with the Wizards. Gough also went on loan to Nottingham Forest from March until May 1999, playing seven matches as the club was relegated.

After leaving San Jose Clash he linked up with former boss Walter Smith at Everton. He played two seasons at Goodison Park making 38 appearances and scoring once against Southampton. During his time at Everton he was made captain for the 2000–01 season and retired from playing in May 2001.

Gough agreed to play as a guest for Australian team Northern Spirit in October 2001, but had to withdraw due to injury.

=== International ===
Gough was also a regular in the Scotland national team in the 1980s. He made his debut against Switzerland in 1983, and went on to gain 61 caps. Gough played in two World Cups (1986 and 1990). He captained his country in the 1992 European Championships in his birthplace, Sweden.

Gough scored six international goals. In 1985, he scored the only goal of the game when Scotland beat England 1–0 at Hampden Park in the inaugural edition of the Rous Cup. He scored two goals in February 1989 in a 3–2 World Cup qualifier win away to Cyprus, with the second being scored in the sixth minute of added time.

His international career was ended prematurely however, after he was critical of coaches Andy Roxburgh and Craig Brown and withdrew himself from further selection.

== Managerial career ==
On 30 November 2004, Gough landed his first and only managerial position with the then Scottish Premier League side Livingston. After a difficult season where the club battled relegation, Gough resigned and cited disagreements with the club's owner over the budget for signing players as the reason. The club was also fined £15,000 by the SFA for a breach of transfer regulations over the signing of Hassan Kachloul during Gough's time as manager although there was no suggestion that Gough himself was responsible for the breach of regulations.

== Later career ==
Gough supported the Rangers Supporters' Trust and Dave King's takeover of Rangers, and was appointed as a global ambassador for the club on 21 September 2015.

== Personal life ==
Gough has resided in San Diego, California, since 1997.

== Career statistics ==
=== International appearances ===
Scotland national team
Year	Apps	Goals
1983	11	1
1984	3	0
1985	6	1
1986	9	1
1987	5	0
1988	6	0
1989	4	2
1990	6	0
1991	3	1
1992	7	0
1993	1	0
Total	61	6

=== International goals ===
Scores and results list Scotland's goal tally first.

#	Date	Venue	Opponent	Score	Result	Competition
1.	16 June 1983	Commonwealth Stadium, Edmonton	Canada	2–0	3–0	Friendly
2.	25 May 1985	Hampden Park, Glasgow	England	1–0	1–0	1985 Rous Cup
3.	26 March 1986	Hampden Park, Glasgow	Romania	2–0	3–0	Friendly
4.	8 February 1989	Tsirion Stadium, Limassol	Cyprus	2–2	3–2	1990 FIFA World Cup qualification
5.	8 February 1989	Tsirion Stadium, Limassol	Cyprus	3–2	3–2	1990 FIFA World Cup qualification
6.	13 November 1991	Hampden Park, Glasgow	San Marino	2–0	4–0	UEFA Euro 1992 qualification

== Honours ==
Dundee United

- Scottish Premier Division: 1982–83
- Forfarshire Cup: 1979–80, 1984–85

Tottenham Hotspur

- FA Cup runner-up: 1986–87

Rangers

- Scottish Premier Division: 1988–89, 1989–90, 1990–91, 1991–92, 1992–93, 1993–94, 1994–95, 1995–96, 1996–97
- Scottish Cup: 1991–92, 1992–93, 1995–96
- Scottish League Cup: 1987–88, 1988–89, 1990–91, 1992–93, 1993–94, 1996–97

Scotland

- The Rous Cup: 1985

=== Individual ===
- SPFA Players' Player of the Year: 1985–86
- SFWA Footballer of the Year: 1988–89
- Scottish Football Hall of Fame
- Scotland national football team roll of honour : 1990
- MLS Best XI: 1997
- MLS All-Star: 1997, 1998

== See also ==
- List of Scotland international footballers born outside Scotland
- List of Scotland national football team captains
- List of Scottish football families
