= 1988–89 Scottish Premier Division =

83rd season of top-tier football league in Scotland

Scottish Premier Division
- Season: 1988–89
- Champions: Rangers; 4th Premier Division title 39th Scottish title
- European Cup: Rangers
- UEFA Cup: Aberdeen; Dundee United; Hibernian
- Cup Winners' Cup: Celtic
- Matches: 180
- Goals: 422 (2.34 per match)
- Top goalscorer: Mark McGhee, Charlie Nicholas (16)
- Biggest home win: Celtic 7–1 St Mirren
- Biggest away win: Hamilton Academical 0–8 Celtic

The 1988–89 Scottish Premier Division season was won by Rangers, six points ahead of Aberdeen. Hamilton Academical were relegated.

== Table ==
Pos	Team	Pld	W	D	L	GF	GA	GD	Pts	Qualification or relegation
1	Rangers (C)	36	26	4	6	62	26	+36	56	Qualification for the European Cup first round
2	Aberdeen	36	18	14	4	51	25	+26	50	Qualification for the UEFA Cup first round
3	Celtic	36	21	4	11	66	44	+22	46	Qualification for the Cup Winners' Cup first round
4	Dundee United	36	16	12	8	44	26	+18	44	Qualification for the UEFA Cup first round
5	Hibernian	36	13	9	14	37	36	+1	35	Qualification for the UEFA Cup first round
6	Heart of Midlothian	36	9	13	14	35	42	−7	31	
7	St Mirren	36	11	7	18	39	55	−16	29	
8	Dundee	36	9	10	17	34	48	−14	28	
9	Motherwell	36	7	13	16	35	44	−9	27	
10	Hamilton Academical (R)	36	6	2	28	19	76	−57	14	Relegation to the 1989–90 Scottish First Division

Source: Statto
Rules for classification: 1) points; 2) goal difference; 3) number of goals scored.
(C) Champions; (R) Relegated

== Results ==
=== Matches 1–18 ===
During matches 1-18 each team plays every other team twice (home and away).

Home \ Away	ABE	CEL	DND	DNU	HAM	HOM	HIB	MOT	RAN	STM
Aberdeen		2–2	1–0	1–1	1–1	1–0	0–0	2–1	2–1	1–1
Celtic	1–3		2–3	1–0	2–1	1–0	1–0	3–1	3–1	7–1
Dundee	1–1	1–0		0–3	5–2	1–1	2–1	1–1	0–0	0–1
Dundee United	2–2	1–0	2–0		1–0	0–0	1–1	1–1	0–1	0–1
Hamilton Academical	0–1	0–8	1–0	0–4		0–4	0–3	1–0	0–2	2–4
Heart of Midlothian	1–1	0–2	1–1	0–0	3–2		1–2	2–2	1–2	1–2
Hibernian	1–2	3–1	1–1	1–1	1–0	0–0		1–0	0–1	2–0
Motherwell	1–1	1–3	1–1	1–2	1–1	2–0	1–1		0–2	1–2
Rangers	1–0	5–1	2–0	0–1	3–1	3–0	0–0	2–1		2–1
St Mirren	1–1	2–3	0–0	0–1	2–0	1–1	0–1	1–0	1–1	

Legend: Blue = home team win; Yellow = draw; Red = away team win.

=== Matches 19–36 ===
During matches 19-36 each team plays every other team a further two times (home and away).

Home \ Away	ABE	CEL	DND	DNU	HAM	HOM	HIB	MOT	RAN	STM
Aberdeen		0–0	2–0	1–0	3–0	3–0	2–0	0–0	1–2	3–1
Celtic	0–0		2–1	1–0	2–0	4–2	1–0	1–2	1–2	2–1
Dundee	2–0	0–3		0–1	1–0	2–1	1–2	2–1	1–2	2–1
Dundee United	1–1	2–0	2–1		0–0	0–0	4–1	1–1	1–1	1–4
Hamilton Academical	0–2	2–0	1–0	0–5		0–2	0–3	0–2	0–1	2–1
Heart of Midlothian	1–0	0–1	3–1	0–0	2–0		2–1	0–0	2–0	2–0
Hibernian	1–2	1–3	1–1	1–2	2–1	1–0		2–0	0–1	1–0
Motherwell	0–2	2–2	1–0	1–2	1–0	1–1	0–0		2–1	4–0
Rangers	0–3	4–1	3–1	2–0	3–0	4–0	1–0	1–0		3–1
St Mirren	1–3	0–1	1–1	0–1	1–0	1–1	3–1	2–1	0–2	

Legend: Blue = home team win; Yellow = draw; Red = away team win.

== Awards ==
- Player awards

Award	Winner	Club
PFA Players' Player of the Year	(Netherlands) Theo Snelders	Aberdeen
PFA Young Player of the Year	(Scotland) Billy McKinlay	Dundee United
SFWA Footballer of the Year	(Scotland) Richard Gough	Rangers

- Manager awards

Award	Winner	Club
SFWA Manager of the Year	(Scotland) Graeme Souness	Rangers

== See also ==
- Nine in a row
