= Gary Stevens (footballer, born 1963) =

English footballer and physiotherapist

Personal information
- Full name: Michael Gary Stevens
- Date of birth: 27 March 1963 (age 63)
- Place of birth: Barrow-in-Furness, Lancashire, England
- Height: 5 ft 11 in (1.80 m)
- Position: Right-back

Senior career*
| Years | Team | Apps | (Gls) |
| 1981–1988 | Everton | 208 | (8) |
| 1988–1994 | Rangers | 187 | (8) |
| 1994–1998 | Tranmere Rovers | 126 | (2) |
| Total | | 521 | (18) |

International career
| 1984 | England U21 | 1 | (0) |
| 1984 | England B | 1 | (0) |
| 1985–1992 | England | 46 | (0) |
| 1990 | Scottish League XI | 1 | (0) |
- * Club domestic league appearances and goals

Michael Gary Stevens (born 27 March 1963) is an English physiotherapist and retired footballer who played as a right-back.

Debuting in 1981, he played in the successful Everton side of the 1980s, where he won the English League Championship twice, the FA Cup once, and the European Cup Winners' Cup once. He was later named by Everton supporters as part of the clubs' greatest ever side. He then transferred to Rangers in 1988, where he won the Scottish Premier Division in six consecutive years and the Scottish Cup once. Upon leaving Rangers in 1994, he signed for Tranmere Rovers, playing there until his retirement in 1998. He also played for the England national team, gaining a total of 46 appearances, and playing at the World Cup in both 1986 and 1990.

In 2002, Stevens graduated from the University of Salford with a degree in physiotherapy. He then worked as a physiotherapist with the Bolton Wanderers Academy, and later became a coach at Chester City. In 2011, Stevens emigrated to Perth, Western Australia, continuing in the line of physiotherapy.

== Club career ==
=== Everton ===
Stevens, who was a right-back, progressed through Everton's youth academy while manager Howard Kendall was building a young team to take on their local competitors Liverpool, who had been winning trophies at a time when Everton hadn't won any major trophy in England since 1970.

Stevens made his Everton debut on 10 October 1981 against West Ham United and settled into the senior game quickly during the second half of the 1981–82 season as Kendall's otherwise ageing side struggled to make an impact on their rivals and on the top flight in general during the first couple of years after Kendall's appointment in 1981. However, with a few astute signings and one or two more graduates from the ranks, Everton reached the 1984 FA Cup final, having already lost to their great rivals in the replay of the League Cup final earlier in the season.

Stevens played his part in Everton's opening goal at Wembley against Watford – his pace enabling him to reach a loose ball from a half-cleared cross first and set up Graeme Sharp for a clinical finish. Everton won 2–0.

The following year, Stevens was an integral part of the Everton team which chased a treble of League Championship, FA Cup and European Cup Winners' Cup. The title was clinched but Everton were beaten by Manchester United (reduced to ten men after Kevin Moran was sent off) in the FA Cup final. However, a glorious and eventful run in Europe ended in triumph for Everton and Stevens when the Cup Winners' Cup was clinched, thanks to a 3–1 win over Rapid Vienna. The only downside of such a successful season was that the Heysel Stadium disaster and subsequent disqualification of all English clubs from European competition meant that Everton were disallowed from trying their luck in the European Cup the following year.

Stevens was again a regular as Everton aimed to defend their League title in 1986, but a rejuvenated Liverpool overhauled them. The two also met in the FA Cup final – the first ever all-Merseyside affair – and Liverpool won that game 3–1 to clinch only the third modern-day "double". Stevens shouldered some of the blame – he played a loose pass which was intercepted by Liverpool's Ronnie Whelan and led to an equaliser for the men in red, who went on to win 3–1.

Stevens again played frequently as the blue half of Merseyside regained the League championship in 1987, although he did incur the wrath of Liverpool fans when a tackle on left back Jim Beglin left the Liverpool player with a badly broken leg—though Beglin's retirement from playing in 1991 was caused by an unrelated knee injury.

At club level, 1988 was not successful for Everton, although Stevens did score a famous goal to give Everton a 1–0 win over Liverpool in the League Cup, at a time when Liverpool were in the process of a 29-game unbeaten start to the league season. Everton were trophyless once again.

=== Rangers ===
In the summer of 1988, Everton accepted a £1.26 million bid from Rangers for Stevens to move north of the border. Rangers were in the midst of a revolution when Stevens joined, with manager Graeme Souness buying non-Scottish players (including many Englishmen) to bolster his side. Stevens' first season ended with a Scottish Premier Division title. He would win five more, plus two Scottish Cups and three Scottish League Cups.

Stevens continued to play for Rangers until 1994, and in 1993 was a key player in their treble winning side. His final season saw them retain the Scottish league title and Scottish League Cup, but their hopes of a second successive treble were ended with a shock Scottish Cup defeat at the hands of Dundee United.

=== Tranmere Rovers ===
Having started the 1994–95 out of favour at Ibrox as manager Walter Smith selected Alex Cleland at right back in the Rangers team, Stevens accepted an offer to move to English Division One promotion challengers Tranmere Rovers on 22 September 1994 for a fee of £350,000. He featured regularly at right back for the Prenton Park club over the next four seasons, making 127 league appearances and helping them qualify for the playoffs (where they lost to Reading in the semi-finals) before managing three successive mid table finishes. Stevens then retired from playing at the end of the 1997–98 season.

== International career ==
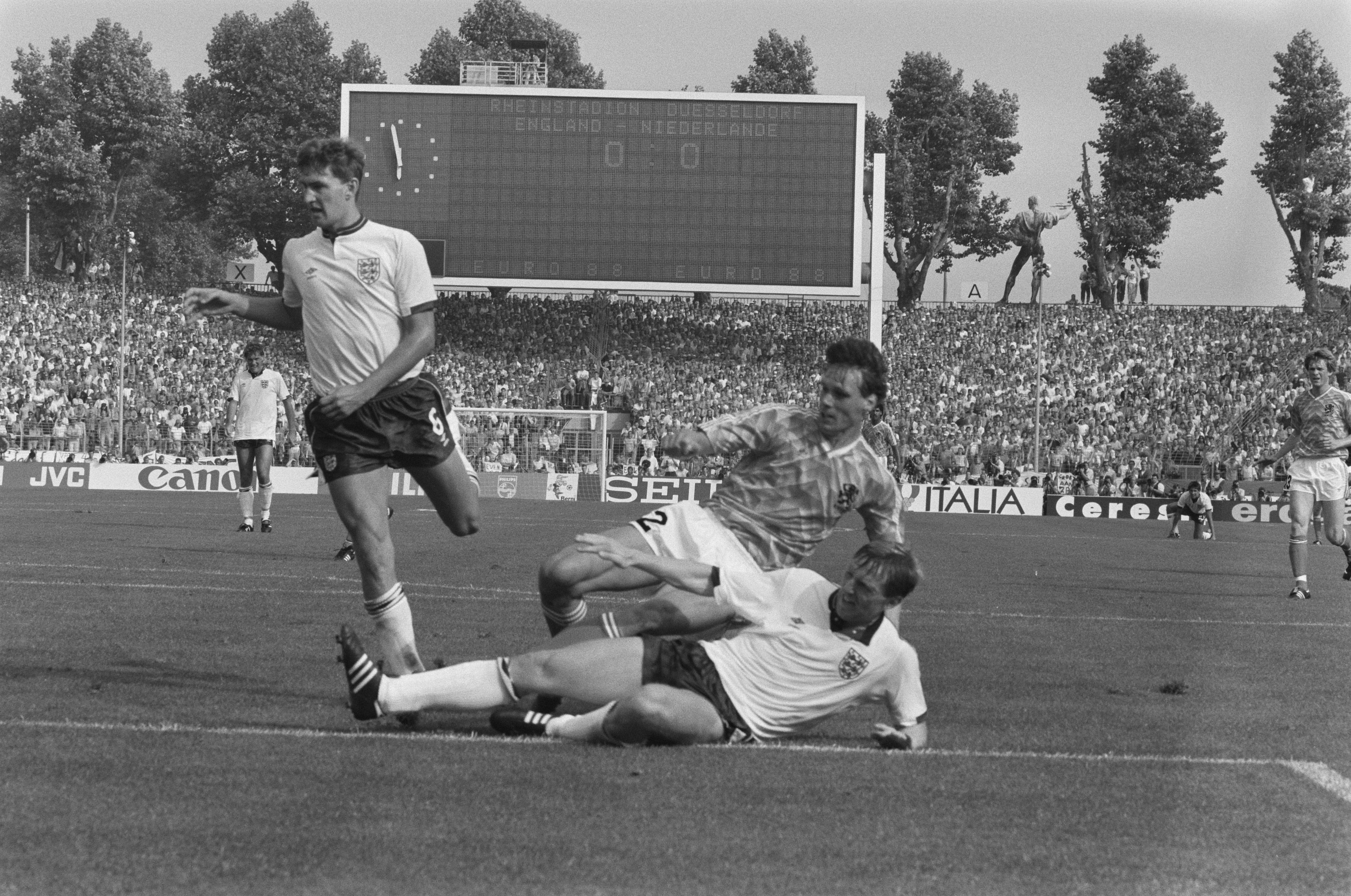
Stevens (centre) playing for England at UEFA Euro 1988, as the Netherlands' Marco van Basten scores the first of his three goals

After a fine season for Everton, Stevens was given his debut for England by Bobby Robson in June 1985, and he quickly established himself as first choice right back for his country.

Stevens was named in the squad for the 1986 FIFA World Cup (along with the Tottenham Hotspur player Gary A. Stevens, which caused a spot of confusion (England supporters humorously chanted "Two Gary Stevens! There's only two Gary Stevens!") and played in all of the games as England reached the quarter-finals, where they were beaten controversially by Argentina, who went on to win the tournament.

England also qualified for UEFA Euro 1988 with Stevens in his familiar No.2 shirt. By now one or two critics had started to scorn him for supposedly poor positional play and ball distribution, but his coaches at club and international level kept resolute faith in him. Unfortunately, the competition was a disaster for both England and Stevens. After a shock defeat to the Republic of Ireland, England went into the tough second group game against the Netherlands needing to win. Stevens was, however, instrumental in the defeat which followed, losing the ball to Ruud Gullit down the flank, which led to the opening goal of a famous hat-trick by Marco van Basten. Stevens had come close to blocking Van Basten's shot when he'd been caught napping wide on the flank seconds earlier by Gullit, showing his speed and determination, but it was tough to accept as England wimped out of the tournament without a point.

When England qualified for the 1990 FIFA World Cup in Italy, Stevens was duly named in the squad though again a handful of critics had been scathing of his displays. However, he was in the side which faced the Republic of Ireland in the opening game. It ended 1–1 – not a disaster, but there were clear problems with the England personnel and tactics and Robson made changes for the next game. Stevens was replaced by Paul Parker, who played so well (despite being more usually a central defender for Queens Park Rangers) that he kept his place up to and including England's dramatic semi-final exit on penalties against West Germany, the eventual winners. Stevens was recalled to play the host nation in the third place play-off, which England lost 2–1.

Parker's emergence – plus that of Arsenal right-back Lee Dixon – left Stevens looking increasingly out of the frame for international football, especially as Robson had quit to return to club football, but he stuck around sporadically for the next two years, getting occasional starts and sub appearances under Graham Taylor.

England qualified for UEFA Euro 1992 but Stevens was left out of Taylor's initial squad in favour of Dixon. When Dixon got injured in the grace period prior to the deadline for squad confirmation, Stevens was recalled, but then he too suffered an injury and withdrew. England ended up taking part in the competition without a recognised right back, and exited in the group stage. Stevens had played his last game for his country. His international career ended with forty-six appearances, although he never scored a goal.

== Personal life ==
Stevens is the uncle of Fontaines D.C. frontman Grian Chatten.

== Honours ==
Everton

- Football League First Division: 1984–85, 1986–87
- FA Cup: 1983–84; runner-up: 1984–85, 1985–86
- FA Charity Shield: 1984, 1985
- European Cup Winners' Cup: 1984–85
- Football League Cup runner-up: 1983–84

Rangers

- Scottish Premier Division: 1988–89, 1989–90, 1990–91, 1991–92, 1992–93, 1993–94
- Scottish Cup: 1991–92
- Scottish League Cup: 1990–91, 1992–93

Individual

- PFA Team of the Year: 1984–85 First Division, 1985–86 First Division, 1987–88 First Division
