= 1990–91 Scottish Premier Division =

85th season of top-tier football league in Scotland

Scottish Premier Division
- Season: 1990–91
- Champions: Rangers; 6th Premier Division title 41st Scottish title
- European Cup: Rangers
- UEFA Cup: Aberdeen; Celtic
- Cup Winners' Cup: Motherwell
- Matches: 180
- Goals: 447 (2.48 per match)
- Top goalscorer: (Republic of Ireland) Tommy Coyne (Celtic, 18)

The 1990–91 Scottish Premier Division season was won by Rangers, two points ahead of Aberdeen. Rangers had seemed on course for a comfortable victory in the championship, but a loss of form around the time of manager Graeme Souness leaving the club allowed a surging Aberdeen to take the lead in the championship after 35 games. The two clubs played a league-deciding match against one another in the final game of the season at Ibrox (only the second time the championship had been settled on the last day between the challengers, after 1965 – it would occur again in 2026). With Aberdeen only requiring a draw, Mark Hateley scored both goals in a 2–0 victory for Rangers, giving them their third successive league championship and 41st overall. Due to a league expansion from 10 to 12 teams, no clubs were relegated.

== Clubs ==
=== Stadia and locations ===
Location of clubs in the 1991–92 Scottish Premier Division

Team	Location	Stadium
Aberdeen	Aberdeen	Pittodrie Stadium
Celtic	Parkhead, Glasgow	Celtic Park
Dundee United	Dundee	Tannadice Park
Dunfermline Athletic	Dunfermline	East End Park
Heart of Midlothian	Gorgie, Edinburgh	Tynecastle Park
Hibernian	Leith, Edinburgh	Easter Road
Motherwell	Motherwell	Fir Park
Rangers	Ibrox, Glasgow	Ibrox Park
St Johnstone	Perth	McDiarmid Park
St Mirren	Paisley	Love Street

=== Managers ===
Team	Manager
Aberdeen	(Scotland) Alex Smith and (Scotland) Jocky Scott (co-managers)
Celtic	(Scotland) Billy McNeill
Dundee United	(Scotland) Jim McLean
Dunfermline Athletic	(Scotland) Iain Munro
Heart of Midlothian	(Scotland) Joe Jordan
Hibernian	(Scotland) Alex Miller
Motherwell	(Scotland) Tommy McLean
Rangers	(Scotland) Walter Smith
St Johnstone	(Scotland) Alex Totten
St Mirren	(Scotland) Tony Fitzpatrick

==== Managerial changes ====
Team	Outgoing manager	Date of vacancy	Manner of departure	Incoming manager	Date of appointment
Dunfermline Athletic	(Scotland) Jim Leishman	31 May 1990	Resigned	(Scotland) Iain Munro	27 July 1990
Heart of Midlothian	(Scotland) Alex MacDonald	9 September 1990	Sacked	(Scotland) Joe Jordan	10 September 1990
Rangers	(Scotland) Graeme Souness	16 April 1991	Signed by Liverpool	(Scotland) Walter Smith	19 April 1991

== League table ==
Pos	Team	Pld	W	D	L	GF	GA	GD	Pts	Qualification or relegation
1	Rangers (C)	36	24	7	5	62	23	+39	55	Qualification for the European Cup first round
2	Aberdeen	36	22	9	5	62	27	+35	53	Qualification for the UEFA Cup first round
3	Celtic	36	17	7	12	52	38	+14	41	Qualification for the UEFA Cup first round
4	Dundee United	36	17	7	12	41	29	+12	41	
5	Heart of Midlothian	36	14	7	15	48	55	−7	35	
6	Motherwell	36	12	9	15	51	50	+1	33	Qualification for the Cup Winners' Cup first round
7	St Johnstone	36	11	9	16	41	54	−13	31	
8	Dunfermline Athletic	36	8	11	17	38	61	−23	27	
9	Hibernian	36	6	13	17	24	51	−27	25	
10	St Mirren	36	5	9	22	28	59	−31	19	

Source: Statto.com
Rules for classification: 1) points; 2) goal difference; 3) number of goals scored.
(C) Champions

== Results ==
=== Matches 1–18 ===
During matches 1-18 each team plays every other team twice (home and away).

Home \ Away	ABE	CEL	DNU	DUF	HOM	HIB	MOT	RAN	STJ	STM
Aberdeen		3–0	1–1	3–2	3–0	2–0	1–1	0–0	0–0	2–1
Celtic	0–3		0–0	1–2	3–0	2–0	2–1	1–2	0–0	4–1
Dundee United	2–3	3–1		3–0	1–1	1–0	1–0	2–1	1–2	1–0
Dunfermline Athletic	1–1	1–1	1–0		2–0	1–1	3–3	0–1	1–2	0–0
Heart of Midlothian	1–0	1–0	1–0	1–1		1–1	3–2	1–3	2–3	1–1
Hibernian	1–1	0–3	0–0	1–1	0–3		1–0	0–0	1–0	1–0
Motherwell	0–0	2–0	0–2	2–0	1–1	4–1		2–4	3–0	1–1
Rangers	2–2	1–1	1–2	3–1	4–0	4–0	1–0		4–1	5–0
St Johnstone	5–0	3–2	1–3	3–2	2–1	1–1	2–1	0–0		0–1
St Mirren	0–4	2–3	1–1	0–1	2–1	1–0	1–0	0–3	2–2	

Legend: Blue = home team win; Yellow = draw; Red = away team win.

=== Matches 19–36 ===
During matches 19-36 each team plays every other team a further two times (home and away).

Home \ Away	ABE	CEL	DNU	DUF	HOM	HIB	MOT	RAN	STJ	STM
Aberdeen		1–0	0–1	0–0	5–0	2–0	3–0	1–0	2–1	1–0
Celtic	1–0		1–0	5–1	1–1	1–1	1–2	3–0	3–0	1–0
Dundee United	1–2	2–1		1–0	2–1	0–0	3–0	1–2	0–0	3–2
Dunfermline Athletic	1–4	0–1	1–0		3–1	1–1	2–5	0–1	3–2	2–2
Heart of Midlothian	1–4	0–1	2–1	4–1		3–1	2–1	0–1	2–1	2–0
Hibernian	2–4	0–2	3–0	1–0	1–4		1–1	0–2	0–1	4–3
Motherwell	0–2	1–1	1–0	1–0	1–3	1–0		3–0	2–2	3–1
Rangers	2–0	2–0	1–0	2–0	2–1	0–0	2–0		3–0	1–0
St Johnstone	0–1	2–3	0–1	0–1	0–2	0–0	1–4	1–1		2–1
St Mirren	0–1	0–2	0–1	2–2	0–0	1–0	2–2	0–1	0–1	

Legend: Blue = home team win; Yellow = draw; Red = away team win.

== Awards ==
- Player awards

Award	Winner	Club
PFA Players' Player of the Year	(England) Paul Elliott	Celtic
PFA Young Player of the Year	(Scotland) Eoin Jess	Aberdeen
SFWA Footballer of the Year	(Scotland) Maurice Malpas	Dundee United

- Manager awards

Award	Winner	Club
SFWA Manager of the Year	(Scotland) Alex Totten	St Johnstone

== See also ==
- Aberdeen F.C.–Rangers F.C. rivalry
- Nine in a row
