= Aberdeen F.C.–Rangers F.C. rivalry =

Football rivalry

Aberdeen–Rangers rivalry
- Location: Scotland
- Teams: Aberdeen F.C.; Rangers F.C.
- First meeting: All time: Rangers 1–0 Aberdeen (26 August 1905; 121 years ago); Modern era: Rangers 1–0 Aberdeen (4 October 1975; 51 years ago)
- Latest meeting: Rangers 1–0 Aberdeen; 2026–27 Scottish League Cup (31 October 2026)
- Next meeting: Rangers v Aberdeen; 2026–27 Scottish Premiership (24 November 2026)
- Stadiums: Pittodrie Stadium, Aberdeen; Ibrox Stadium, Glasgow

Statistics
- Total meetings: All time: 367; Modern era: 205
- Most wins: All time: Rangers – 186; Modern era: Rangers – 102
- Top scorer: Ally McCoist – 14; Derek Johnstone – 14; James Tavernier – 15
- Largest victory: All time: Aberdeen 6–0 Rangers, 10 April 1954; 72 years ago Modern era: Rangers 6–1 Aberdeen, 5 October 1977; 49 years ago Rangers 5–0 Aberdeen, 22 January 2000; 26 years ago Rangers 5–0 Aberdeen, 31 October 2004; 22 years ago Rangers 5–0 Aberdeen, 28 September 2019; 7 years ago

The Aberdeen–Rangers rivalry refers to football matches and related activity involving the Scottish football clubs Aberdeen and Rangers.

Unlike Rangers' Old Firm rivalry with Glasgow neighbours Celtic dating back to the 1900s, the feud with Aberdeen is a comparatively modern phenomenon which developed from the 1970s on a competitive sporting basis but escalated into hostility on the pitch and in the stands, with the animosity continuing into the 21st century.

The rivalry was at its peak during the 1980s and early 1990s when Aberdeen became a force in Scottish football. The two clubs battled for the national championship and met in several cup finals, with various incidents occurring on and off the field. The intensity diminished from the late 1990s as the fortunes of the clubs diverged, with Rangers dominant and Aberdeen unable to match them, as had been the case for much of their history, although the behaviour of players and supporters on occasion showed there remained some animosity between the clubs.

In mid-2012, Rangers ceased to be a member of the top division of Scottish football due to serious financial issues, and in their absence Aberdeen emerged as the main challengers to Celtic. When Rangers returned in 2016, they and Aberdeen were again on a more equal footing with the matches between them being of great significance to their league fate; the clubs' fortunes gradually diverged until the 2020–21 Scottish Premiership season, when Rangers won the title for the first time in a decade with an unbeaten campaign including four wins over Aberdeen, who accumulated barely half as many points and finished fourth.

== Background ==
Since the introduction of nationwide football in Scotland, the relationship between Rangers and Aberdeen had been unremarkable. In addition to being based in cities of different size and character 150 miles apart on opposite sides of Scotland, their stature did not bear comparison; Rangers, backed by a huge fan base, were dominant in the domestic game along with their rivals Celtic almost from the inception of the Scottish Football League in the 1890s, with the rivalry between the Glasgow clubs, which became known as the Old Firm fuelled by elements involving religion, national identity and ethnic background, while Aberdeen (who joined the league in 1905) were only one of several smaller clubs across the country who occasionally enjoyed good league runs or reached cup finals. The Reds had secured just one national title by 1975 compared to 36 for Rangers, with two Scottish Cup wins to Rangers' 20 and one League Cup to Rangers' seven.

The clubs had met twice in finals: the 1947 League Cup final which was won 4–0 by Rangers, and the 1953 Scottish Cup final which Rangers won after a replay in front of a crowd of 113,700. They had also contested the final of the wartime 1946 Southern League Cup, won by Aberdeen, which although taking place after the conflict ended, remained unofficial. The match was watched by a crowd of 135,000 at Hampden Park.

The established situation changed somewhat in the late 1970s when Aberdeen began to offer a major challenge to the Old Firm under managers Ally MacLeod, Billy McNeill and then most significantly Alex Ferguson. At the same time, the introduction of the new Premier Division format – a smaller number of clubs playing one another four times – provided double the number of direct confrontations as before.

=== 1970s battles ===
An early indication of Aberdeen's improvement was their victory in the 1976–77 Scottish League Cup under Ally MacLeod (who was soon to become Scotland coach) after earlier beating Rangers 5–1 in the semi-final. They had also won a Scottish Cup tie at Ibrox for the first time ever in March 1975, but went no further in that competition, whereas Rangers recovered to finish as league champions in the league title in the last season of the old format, signalling an end to Celtic's decade of dominance, and lifted all the domestic trophies in 1975–76, the third treble in their history.

In 1977–78, new manager Billy McNeill led Aberdeen to runners–up spot in the Scottish Premier Division, two points behind Rangers and to the final of the Scottish Cup where they lost 2–1 to Rangers as the Light Blues completed another treble. In addition to the increasing competitive rivalry between the teams, The animosity between supporters was amplified, setting the tone for the years to come, at a particularly troubled league match on 24 December 1977 at Pittodrie, which Aberdeen won 4–0 to close to within three points of leaders Rangers. With the score at 3–0, a large proportion of the Rangers fans attempted to invade the pitch several times to force an abandonment; under a hail of bottles and cans, police officers contained the situation within the ground. Following the match there was significant public disorder around the stadium and in the city centre, with 22 arrests made in total.

McNeill's strong managerial performance led to the former Celtic captain being recruited by his old club during the summer of 1978, leaving Aberdeen searching for a replacement once again. McNeill's replacement, Alex Ferguson, was a boyhood Rangers fan from Govan who had played for the club for two years in the 1960s before being shown the door abruptly after a poor performance in the 1969 Scottish Cup final. Like McNeill, Ferguson came with a growing reputation; however, he had also been fired from his previous role at St Mirren for misconduct. At the same point, Rangers manager Jock Wallace, who had been at the helm for six years and led his side to both of those treble wins, resigned unexpectedly after serious disputes with Willie Waddell, the previous boss who had become the club's general manager. Rangers turned to their retiring team captain John Greig to take the reins in his first managerial role, in the end of an era at Ibrox.

=== Aberdeen's rise ===
The clubs met in the 1978–79 Scottish League Cup final which Rangers won, scoring the winner in the last minute after Aberdeen had earlier been controversially reduced to 10 men; Doug Rougvie was sent off after a clash with Derek Johnstone – Alex Ferguson backed Rougvie's version of events that Johnstone had used simulation to have him dismissed. Ferguson felt a sense of injustice at the outcome in what was his first major final as a manager, and from that point on he instilled a siege mentality in his players, many of whom were from the Glasgow area including defensive stalwarts Willie Miller and Alex McLeish. He stated publicly that Aberdeen were unfairly treated compared to the big Glasgow clubs while also deflecting attention and pressure onto opponents (a trick learned during his time as a Rangers player from Celtic manager Jock Stein) and onto himself prior to big matches. Ferguson was particularly determined to conquer his old club.

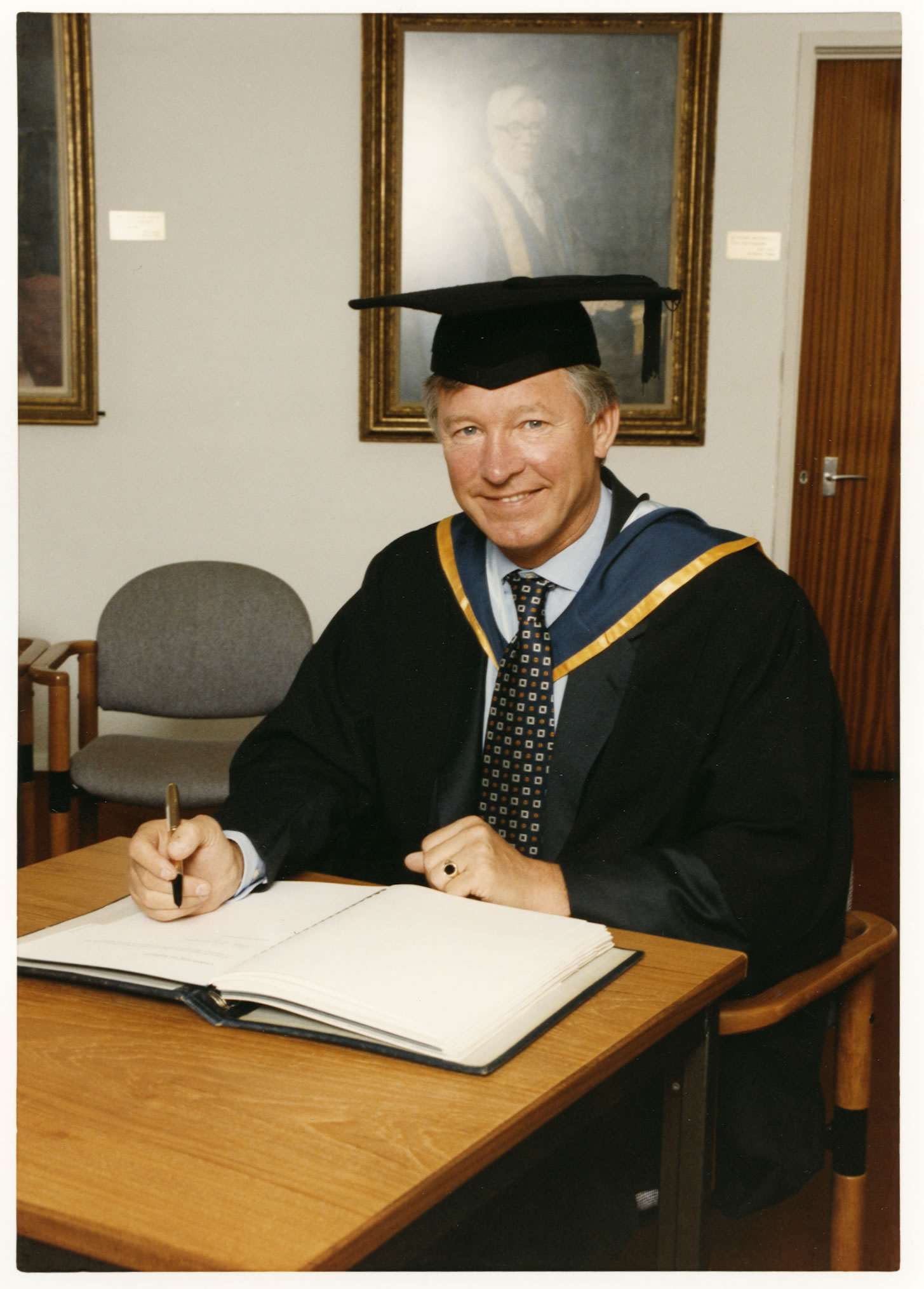
Alex Ferguson played for Rangers and managed Aberdeen.

Aberdeen eliminated Rangers from the next edition of the League Cup (although they lost the final to another emerging power, Dundee United) and went on to become champions of the 1979–80 Scottish Premier Division after Ferguson took the decision to drop the club's top scorer Joe Harper from the team. Rangers gained some revenge in the semi-final of the same season's Scottish Cup, but when the teams next faced off in the League Cup it was Aberdeen who prevailed; Rangers would win that trophy the following year, in addition to the 1980–81 Scottish Cup, overcoming Dundee United in both finals.

Ferguson's Aberdeen were then beginning an unprecedented spell of success, with two further league titles and three consecutive Scottish Cups among the trophies won, including victories over Rangers in the finals of 1982 (4–1) – a week after a 4–0 victory in their final league meeting, a futile effort to snatch the title from Celtic on goal difference – and 1983 (1–0). In a post-match television interview following the latter fixture, played just ten days after Aberdeen had defeated Real Madrid to win the European Cup Winners' Cup, Ferguson publicly lambasted his players for their level of performance and continued in the same manner back in the dressing room, such were the high standards he demanded against Rangers – he later apologised. He also admitted that his main reason for wanting his team to beat Rangers more comprehensively was his sense of vengeance for the treatment he received at Ibrox over his marriage to his Catholic wife, Cathy, regarding the final as a chance to "put the knife in them.".

By contrast, Rangers were struggling financially and endured one of the worst runs in their history under managers John Greig and the returning Jock Wallace (having tried unsuccessfully to tempt Ferguson back to Ibrox). They failed to win the league from 1978 until 1987, finished below Aberdeen for seven successive seasons, and collected only four domestic cups from sixteen available in the period. One achievement of Wallace's second spell was utilising the talents of Ally McCoist more effectively than Greig had done, and the striker would go on to become the club's all-time top goalscorer (including 14 in matches against Aberdeen).

At that time the previously quiet city of Aberdeen was also experiencing an economic boom relating to North Sea oil whereas most of the traditional industries in the city of Glasgow were in terminal decline, so they were no longer the poor relation in the distant north. Additionally, the rise of hooliganism in that era involved clashes between Rangers' Inter City Firm and Aberdeen's Soccer Casuals with both mobs ready to travel across the country in their hundreds, intent on causing trouble in the other's territory. On-field events increased the tensions, such as Rangers' Willie Johnston's stamp on John McMaster's neck in 1980 requiring mouth-to-mouth resuscitation, a particularly violent match at Ibrox in 1985 which also involved fans invading the pitch, and various other clashes featuring multiple red cards. All these factors contributed to a fiery atmosphere among players and fans whenever the clubs met.

=== Rangers revival ===
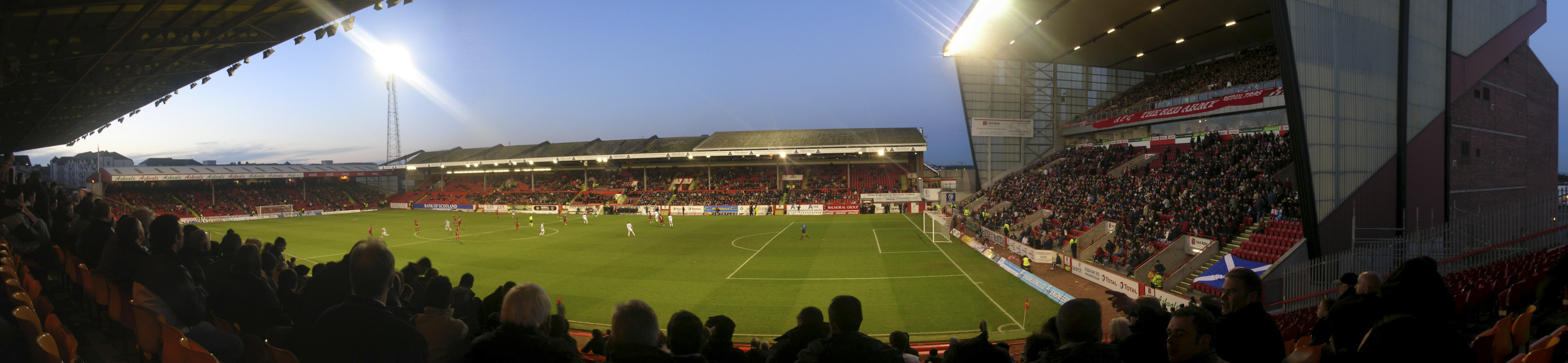
Aberdeen's Pittodrie Stadium viewed from the away supporters' section (2006)

A turning point was in 1986–87, when Alex Ferguson left Aberdeen to join Manchester United and Graeme Souness became Rangers manager with new financial backing from David Holmes and then David Murray. The Glasgow club began entice several top English players to move north due to Souness's connections and with the incentives of big wages and the prospect of European football (English clubs were banned following the Heysel Stadium disaster in 1985). Rangers finally regained the league championship – clinching the 1986–87 title with a draw at Pittodrie, followed by a pitch invasion by their celebrating fans – while Aberdeen failed to win a cup or finish in the top two places for the first time in eight years. This was the start of a sustained period of great success for Rangers, though Aberdeen would remain a significant opponent during the next decade.

Relations between the clubs reached a new low in 1988 following Neil Simpson's brutal challenge on Ian Durrant (at the time regarded as one of Scotland's biggest emerging talents) which almost ended his career, caused him to miss almost three years of football and forced him to adjust his playing style to compensate for his damaged knee ligaments. That incident took place during a league match a few weeks before the second of three hard-fought Scottish League Cup finals between them. Some Aberdeen fans took to singing distasteful songs about Durrant's injury (as well as the 1971 Ibrox disaster) which in turn led to insulting comments from Rangers players in books and in the club's match programme, promoting an official apology. Aberdeen supporters also grew irritated with the increasing gulf in wealth between the clubs, with Rangers able to acquire their players (Davie Dodds and Robertson and later Wright and Snelders) seemingly at will. Away from football, the city of Glasgow also experienced an economic recovery while Aberdeen suffered the effects of an oil recession.

=== Blue dominance ===
With Celtic in a period of turmoil and unable to compete with their old enemy, Aberdeen tried in vain to match Rangers as they became ever more dominant. In five out of six title-winning seasons for Graeme Souness and Walter Smith's sides between 1989 and 1994, Aberdeen finished runners-up, with the closest finish occurring in 1990–91 when Mark Hateley scored twice in a winner-takes-all clash at Ibrox Stadium on the final day to win the title by two points – as well as a missed opportunity for Aberdeen at the time, in retrospect it was something of a pivotal event for Scottish football as the Gers became increasingly dominant in the following years, while no teams outwith Rangers and Celtic have come as close to winning the title since. Aberdeen, managed at that time by Alex Smith, were victorious on their next visit to Glasgow in September 1991 but would not win at Ibrox again for 26 years.

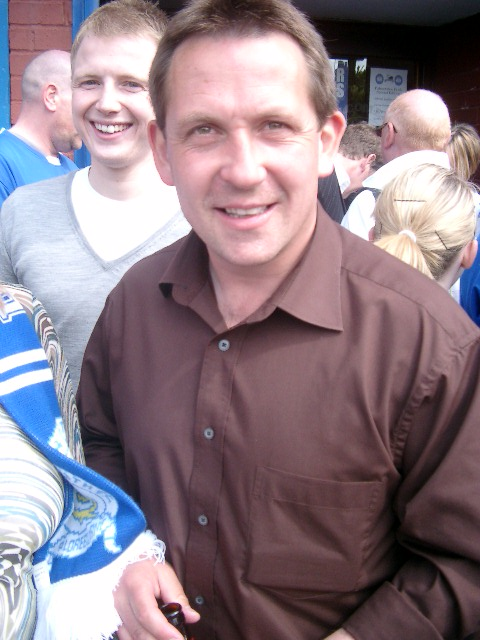
Billy Dodds played for both clubs in the 1990s

Rangers eliminated Aberdeen from the early stage of knockout competitions twice in quick succession (1990–91 Scottish League Cup, 1991–92 Scottish Cup) on their way to winning them, and both the 1992 Scottish League Cup final and the 1993 Scottish Cup final finished Rangers 2, Aberdeen 1. Aberdeen supporters' frustration at the situation occasionally manifested as acts of violence, with Ally McCoist having a golf ball impregnated with nails thrown at him during a fixture at Pittodrie in 1993, and Mark Hateley being assaulted as he left Aberdeen's stadium following a match the following year. For their part, Rangers fans attacked a car containing Willie Miller's family as it was driven up to the stadium for the 1993 Scottish Cup final, having observed the Aberdeen badge on its windscreen.

The only interruption to the Glasgow club's dominance, and the final season of any real competitive significance to the rivalry in that era, was in 1995–96 when Aberdeen won the League Cup after eliminating Rangers in the semi-final (it would be their last trophy for 19 years); however that same season Rangers clinched the League for the eighth year running with a home win over third-placed Aberdeen, with Paul Gascoigne scoring a hat-trick.

In the late 1990s Celtic re-emerged as Rangers' principal sporting rival while Aberdeen collapsed as a force, finishing near the foot of the table far more often than towards the top. Outwith the matches themselves, an Aberdeen supporter made himself proud in April 1999 when he ran from the away fans' section at Ibrox to assault comedian Andy Cameron who was performing a routine on the pitch prior to kick-off – he was banned by the club and fined at court.

The most recent showpiece event between the clubs was the 2000 Scottish Cup final which Rangers won 4–0, but that effectively ceased to be a contest in the opening minutes when Aberdeen (bottom of the league so expected to lose to champions Rangers in any event) had to deploy striker Robbie Winters in goal when Jim Leighton was injured with no substitute keeper on the bench. One of the goalscorers was former Dons striker Billy Dodds who had been a makeweight in the transfer of Winters but rediscovered his form at Dundee United and was quickly signed by Rangers.

=== 21st century ===
Crowd disorder and player indiscipline kept the hostile spirit of the rivalry alive in the early 21st century, with various instances of minute silences being disrupted, red cards being shown to players, missiles being thrown inside the stadia (including seats) and the continued presence of the respective 'casual' hooligan firms.

Two specific incidents of note were Fernando Ricksen's ban on video evidence after a kung-fu kick on Darren Young was missed by the referee during a 2000–01 fixture, and riot police being deployed at Pittodrie in January 2002 with home fans having run onto the pitch to confront away supporters who had thrown coins at Winters. Former Dons hero Alex McLeish had just become Rangers boss, and was initially applauded onto the field by Aberdeen followers before events took an unpleasant turn. In the aftermath of that disturbance, which took place during a live television broadcast across the UK, the authorities decided that matches between the clubs would no longer take place on weekend evenings to minimise the chance of spectators engaging in disorder having spent the whole day drinking alcohol; a similar decision had been made on Old Firm games a few years prior.

Later events included Aberdeen securing third place for the first time in a decade on the last day at Pittodrie in 2006–07, Nacho Novo being sent off as Rangers lost the league crown on the last day at the same venue the following season, Kyle Lafferty feigning injury to get Charlie Mulgrew dismissed in 2009, and an outbreak of organised hooligan violence by an Aberdeen faction at Ibrox subway station in 2012.

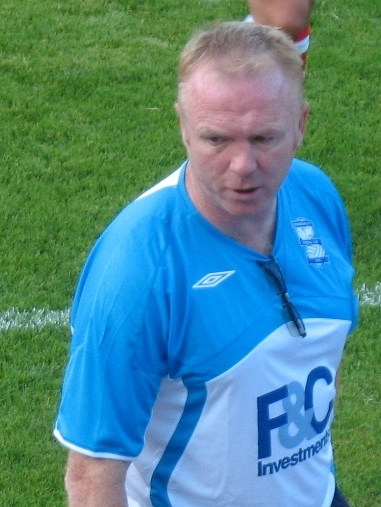
Alex McLeish played for Aberdeen and managed Rangers

In 2012 Rangers' holding-company were liquidated and the new company that bought the team, the business and assets from the administrators did not achieve the transfer of Rangers' league place – Aberdeen plus all other SPL clubs except Kilmarnock voted against it. Rangers were accepted into the fourth tier of the Scottish football league system which meant that no matches were played between the rivals for four years. In the interim Aberdeen won the 2013–14 Scottish League Cup.

=== Rangers return ===
Rangers returned to the Scottish Premiership for the 2016–17 season. In the build-up to their first meeting of the season at Pittodrie, Rangers' manager Mark Warburton described Aberdeen fans' hatred towards his club as "Quite sad". On the day of the match, the Rangers team bus was found to have been vandalised, with offensive references to the Ibrox Disaster and Ian Durrant. Banners were also observed in the city claiming that Rangers followers "Let your club die", referencing their commercial liquidation four years earlier. In the aftermath of their second meeting in Aberdeen during April 2017, several arrests were made.

Before their final match of that season, Warburton's successor Pedro Caixinha chose to comment on his opponents, suggesting that they may need to rebuild after finishing as runners-up for three successive seasons; the Aberdeen manager Derek McInnes, a former Gers player, responded that Rangers should be embarrassed to rank below his team due to the disparity in their financial resources. Aberdeen won that match to finally break a 43-game winless streak at Ibrox, and finished ahead of Rangers for the first time since 1986 (excepting Rangers' years in lower divisions). They also reached the season's two cup finals, losing both to Celtic (who had beaten Rangers in the semi-final of each).

The two clubs were closely matched during the 2017–18 season, battling for second place for much of the campaign after failing to keep pace with eventual champions Celtic. Neither could build a lasting lead over the other, with Rangers' general inconsistency negating their nine-point superiority from the meetings with Aberdeen. The matter was not settled until the final matchday of the season, when Rangers quickly fell 3–0 behind away to Hibernian (for whom a six-goal victory would snatch third position from the opponents) then scored five without reply, only to be pegged back in the final minutes for a dramatic 5–5 finish. However that outcome mattered little after Aberdeen won 1–0 at Celtic Park (the first Scottish team to win there since 2015, having lost all of their previous 25 league visits), meaning Rangers could not catch the Dons regardless of their own result. By then, the Gers had already arranged for Steven Gerrard to become their next manager.

Rangers and Aberdeen were drawn to meet in the semi-final of the 2018–19 Scottish League Cup on 28 October 2018 at Hampden Park, their first meeting outwith the league in 14 years and the first at a neutral venue since 2000. The build-up was dominated by administrative disputes surrounding the scheduling and venue (that fixture and the other semi-final between Celtic and Heart of Midlothian were initially both planned for the same stadium on the same day) and then ratios of tickets available to each club. Aberdeen won the match 1–0 to progress to the final, with the only goal scored by midfielder Lewis Ferguson whose father Derek and uncle Barry were both former Rangers players in the same position. Aberdeen won by the same scoreline in the next league meeting at Ibrox to end a brief spell for Rangers at the top of the table, with both teams having a player sent off. Rangers won 4–2 at Pittodrie in February 2019, Gerrard's first win over McInnes at the fourth attempt; Alfredo Morelos scored twice but was then shown a red card (as he had been in the two previous league clashes that season) along with Scott McKenna, scorer of Aberdeen's winner in Glasgow. In early March, with the clubs having not played in a cup for so long, they were drawn together in a second such meeting in the same season, in the quarter-final of the 2018–19 Scottish Cup at Pittodrie. That match finished 1–1, requiring a replay and the winners knowing they would face Celtic; Aberdeen progressed with a 2–0 victory at Ibrox, their first Scottish Cup win at that venue since 1975. With another league meeting to come, this meant there would be seven fixtures between them in 2018–19 – only the third season ever to feature so many matches, and the first instance since 1979–80. That seventh meeting at the end of April 2019 was won 2–0 by Rangers to confirm runners-up spot in the Premiership, and with Celtic having won the Scottish Cup semi-final convincingly and secured the title by a large margin, both Rangers and Aberdeen were left without a major trophy for another year, but with the Glasgow club finishing higher for the first time since 2012.

The indications that Rangers had once again become significantly more powerful than Aberdeen were reinforced when they won 5–0 in their first meeting of the 2019–20 season at Ibrox, the widest winning margin in 15 years. Rangers also took a two-goal lead in the next match at Pittodrie, but this time Aberdeen fought back for a 2–2 draw, a result that, along with the following fixture at Ibrox three months later which ended goalless, negatively impacted the Glasgow club's title challenge in which few points were being dropped by either Rangers or eventual champions Celtic. The following season Rangers made no such mistakes, beating Aberdeen three times as part of a 32-match unbeaten run which saw them confirmed as title winners in early March 2021, a first major trophy in a decade; at that point Aberdeen had 39 fewer points and were in a battle to finish third. While Gerrard had proven his coaching abilities, McInnes was dismissed a day later, a decision not directly relating to Rangers' win but a gradual decline from the standards his team had set a few years earlier. Rangers went on to complete an unbeaten league season (dropping only 12 points across the 38 fixtures), confirmed with a 4–0 win over Aberdeen on the final day; the Dons finished fourth.

The 2022–23 Scottish League Cup semi-final between the clubs was a close affair, Rangers coming from behind to win 2–1 after extra time at Hampden (their equaliser coming from Ryan Jack and the winner set up by Scott Wright, both former Aberdeen men). Towards the end of the league campaign, Aberdeen (now managed by former Rangers youth player Barry Robson) won 2–0 at Pittodrie, a result which helped them to secure 3rd place in the Premiership while denting Rangers' faint hopes of catching Celtic for the title. 18 arrests were later made in relation to disorder surrounding the match, and Rangers issued a statement condemning the abusive chanting by some home supporters. The last meeting of the season was a 1–0 win at Ibrox for Rangers, who finished runners-up seven points behind their local rivals but 35 ahead of Aberdeen.

At the start of the 2023–24 season, a rare win for Aberdeen at Ibrox (3–1, with Scott Wright sent off against his old club) was followed immediately by Rangers sacking manager Michael Beale, that defeat having followed several other poor results. The Scottish League Cup final at the end of the calendar year brought the clubs together in a final for the first time in 23 years, and the first in that competition for 31 years. In a match hampered by poor weather and numerous fouls, Aberdeen offered very little offensively but Philippe Clement's Rangers struggled to make the breakthrough until captain James Tavernier scored the only goal to bring the trophy back to Ibrox for the first time in 12 years and extend their record total of League Cups to 28; Aberdeen again failed to add to victories in the same competition in 1995 and 2014, those being their only trophies since 1990. It was defender Tavernier's 14th goal in the fixture, tying him with Ally McCoist and Derek Johnstone as the all-time top scorer.

== Supporter attitudes ==
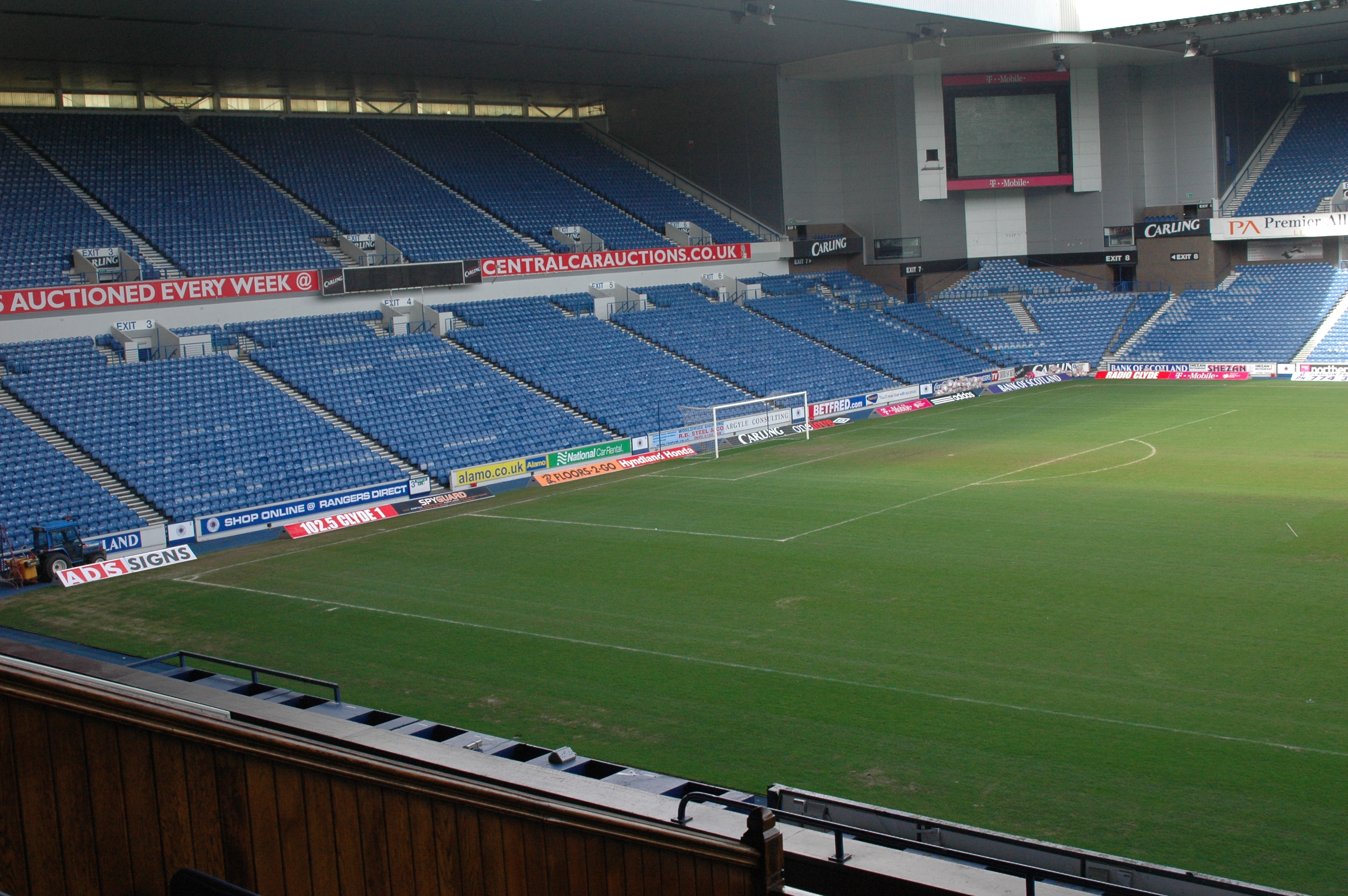
Rangers' Ibrox Stadium looking towards away supporters' section below screen (2006)

The majority of Aberdeen supporters consider Rangers to be their main rival (some sing proudly "We hate Rangers more than you [do]" towards Celtic counterparts), with no other professional clubs nearby and the closest opponents Dundee United and Inverness CT usually focusing on their own local grudges (Dundee derby and Highland derby respectively). Aberdeen's 'New Firm' battles with Dundee United became a redundant concept when both clubs faded almost entirely from prominence in Scottish football after the early 1990s.

Rangers managers Walter Smith and Steven Gerrard, and captain Richard Gough, have been among those who have expressed a belief that the Aberdeen players raise their performance in the Rangers fixtures while making insufficient effort in other matches. Aberdeen were beaten heavily by Celtic on several occasions between 1999 and 2010 (including a 9–0, two 7–0s and two 6–0s) but avoided any truly embarrassing results against Rangers with most scorelines fairly close, even in seasons where Rangers had a much stronger team – albeit 5–0 wins were recorded in 2000, 2004 and 2019. Conversely, an observation has been made that in their own weaker spells, Rangers players seem to find extra reserves to ensure they get a good result against Aberdeen.

Rangers fans' main focus of enmity has always been Celtic, and they often seek to downplay the significance of the Aberdeen games by dismissing them as an irrelevant opponent, but many supporters maintain a distrust of the Dons due to the incidents of the past and are only too willing to reciprocate any animosity shown towards them.

Although Aberdeen's years of weak performances led to less significance being placed on their meetings in terms of league position (with a match report on the Rangers website in 2002 describing the beaten Aberdeen team as "A pathetic shadow of the side they used to be"), the fixture remains one of the highlights of the Scottish football calendar. The struggle for Rangers to regain their dominant position in the Scottish game following their financial collapse, with Aberdeen having become the most credible challenger to Celtic in their absence (finishing second for the two prior seasons), added a renewed competitive edge to the encounters upon the return of the Glasgow club to the top division.

Following the July 2017 UK Supreme Court ruling that Rangers' use of £47 million-worth of EBT payments to employees over nine years were undeclared taxable earnings, Aberdeen supporters made clear their desire for the Glasgow club to be punished with the removal of honours won during the period although it would have no direct benefit to their club. After the Scottish Football Association and the Scottish Professional Football League declared that no new review of the circumstances would be forthcoming, the chairman Stewart Milne expressed his desire for the matter to be put to rest.

The animosity between the supporters, particularly by Aberdeen's towards Rangers, was still evident in 2023: a fixture at Pittodrie with little direct importance (more than 20 points separated the teams in the league table) was marked by offensive chanting, missiles being thrown at opposing fans and windows of coaches being smashed; 18 arrests were made in the subsequent investigation.

== Personnel with both clubs ==
A number of players have played for both clubs during the acknowledged years of their rivalry, although direct transfers are fairly rare. An unusual deal between the clubs was the exchange/loan move of Ricky Foster and Andrius Velicka in 2010 – striker Velicka hardly featured for the Dons and was released, but full-back Foster (who had been almost ever-present in his previous four seasons at Aberdeen) played regularly for the Gers, including in the Champions League, and won a SPL winner's medal. On returning to Pittodrie he was made captain, which was not well received by some fans.

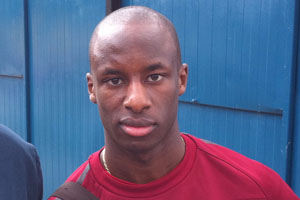
Sone Aluko played for both clubs in the 2010s

In 2011, based on his own experiences two decades earlier, David Robertson advised Sone Aluko to expect a hostile reaction from fans when he signed for Rangers a short time after leaving Aberdeen. As it transpired, Aluko played in just one fixture between the clubs (at Ibrox) which passed without major incident for the player before he returned to England after the financial collapse of Rangers.

In summer 2017, Aberdeen captain Ryan Jack allowed his contract to expire and left on a free transfer, signing for Rangers a few days later; he was immediately targeted for abuse online by supporters of his former club. In November of the same year, before he had played for Rangers at Pittodrie, Jack was selected to make his full Scotland debut in a friendly which happened to take place in Aberdeen. In the opening stages of the match he was jeered and booed whenever he touched the ball by some of the crowd; other fans responded to this by cheering and applauding him. When Rangers did visit Aberdeen, Jack was sent off for a bad tackle, although his team won the match.

=== Derek McInnes ===
Former Rangers midfielder Derek McInnes became manager of Aberdeen in 2013. His connection with his previous club led him being linked to a move to Ibrox whenever a change in leadership would occur, but the Pittodrie chairman Stewart Milne expressed his reluctance to allow any approach. McInnes, who stated on several occasions that he was happy at Aberdeen, was also offered advice from Alex Ferguson on dealing with cup finals.

In early December 2017, the two clubs played in the league twice in four days, with Rangers (led by caretaker manager Graeme Murty) winning home and away to close a six-point deficit and overtake Aberdeen in the standings. The matches took place amidst constant media attention as to whether McInnes was about to become the Rangers boss. McInnes did not make excuses that the ongoing speculation impacted Aberdeen's preparation for those important fixtures, or that it was behind their general form (which had suffered a downturn after Rangers dismissed Pedro Caixinha), but he did express his irritation that the matter had dragged on for so long. On 5 December, Rangers did make a formal approach to speak with McInnes, but this was refused by Milne, and after internal discussions it was announced that he would remain with Aberdeen. McInnes was dismissed by Aberdeen on 8 March 2021, a day after Rangers were confirmed as Scottish champions for the first time in a decade under manager Steven Gerrard, appointed six months after the Glasgow club approached McInnes.

=== List of personnel ===
List applies since the advent of the Scottish Premier Division in 1975. Prior to this, Dave Smith, Alex Willoughby and Jim Forrest were among the prominent players with both clubs.

As of July 2026

Name	Years at Aberdeen (Note: Single spell as a player unless otherwise stated.)	Years at Rangers	Direct	Ref.
Craig Brown	2010–2013 (Note: As manager)	1958–1960 (Note: Youth teams only)	No	
Alex Ferguson	1978–1986	1967–1969	No	
Alex Miller	1997–1998	1967–1982	No	
Dougie Bell	1978–1985	1985–1987	Yes	
Alex McLeish	1978–1994	2001–2006	No	
Neale Cooper	1979–1986, 1990 (Note: Two spells as a player)	1988–1990	Yes	
Archie Knox	1980–1983, 2010–2013 (Note: Two spells as assistant manager)	1991–1998 (Note: As assistant manager)	No	
Jim Bett	1985–1994	1980–1983	No	
Nicky Walker	1996–1997	1983–1990	No	
Jimmy Nicholl	2004–2009	1983–1984, 1986–1989, 2018–2019	No	
Davie Dodds	1986–1989	1989–1991, 1991–1998 (Note: Spell as player then as coach)	Yes	
David Robertson	1985–1991	1991–1997	Yes	
Eoin Jess	1987–1995, 1997–2001	1984–1987 (Note: Youth teams only)	Yes	
Stephen Wright	1986–1995	1995–1998	Yes	
Theo Snelders	1988–1996	1996–1999	Yes	
Barry Nicholson	2005–2008	1992–2000	No	
Billy Dodds	1994–1998	1999–2003	No	
Derek McInnes	2013–2021	1995–2000, 2026–	No	
Barry Robson	2013–2024 (Note: As player 2013–2016, coach 2016–2023 and manager 2023–2024)	1995–1997	No	
Stephen Hughes	2012–2013	1999–2005	No	
Maurice Ross	2009–2010	2000–2005	No	
Steven MacLean	2010	2002–2004	No	
Steven Smith	2011	2002–2010, 2013–2015	No	
Ricky Foster	2003–2012	2010–2011, 2013–2015 (Note: Two spells as a player, the first as a loan from Aberdeen)	Yes	
Gavin Rae	2012–2013	2004–2007	No	
Gregg Wylde	2013–2014	2005–2012	No	
Nicky Clark	2006–2009 (Note: Youth teams only)	2013–2016	No	
Kenny McLean	2015–2018	2006–2008	No	
Sone Aluko	2007–2011	2011–2012	Yes	
Andrius Velicka	2010–2011 (Note: Loan from Rangers)	2008–2011	Yes	
Ryan Jack	2008–2017	2017–2024	Yes	
Dominic Ball	2017–2019 (Note: Two loan spells)	2015–2016 (Note: On loan)	No	
Lewis Ferguson	2018–2022	2009–2013	No	
Greg Stewart	2017–2018, 2019 (Note: Two loan spells)	2009–2013, 2019–2021	No	
Ross McCrorie	2020–2023 (Note: Initially on loan with obligation to buy)	2012–2020, 2026–	Yes (Note: Rangers to Aberdeen move only)	
Scott Wright	2008–2021	2021–2024	Yes	
David Bates	2021–2022	2016–2018 (Note: Initially on loan)	No	
Connor Barron	2011–2024	2024–	Yes	
Bojan Miovski	2022–2024	2025–	No	
Lawrence Shankland	2013–2017	2026–	No	
Lewis Mayo	2026–	2019–2023	No	

== Head to head record ==
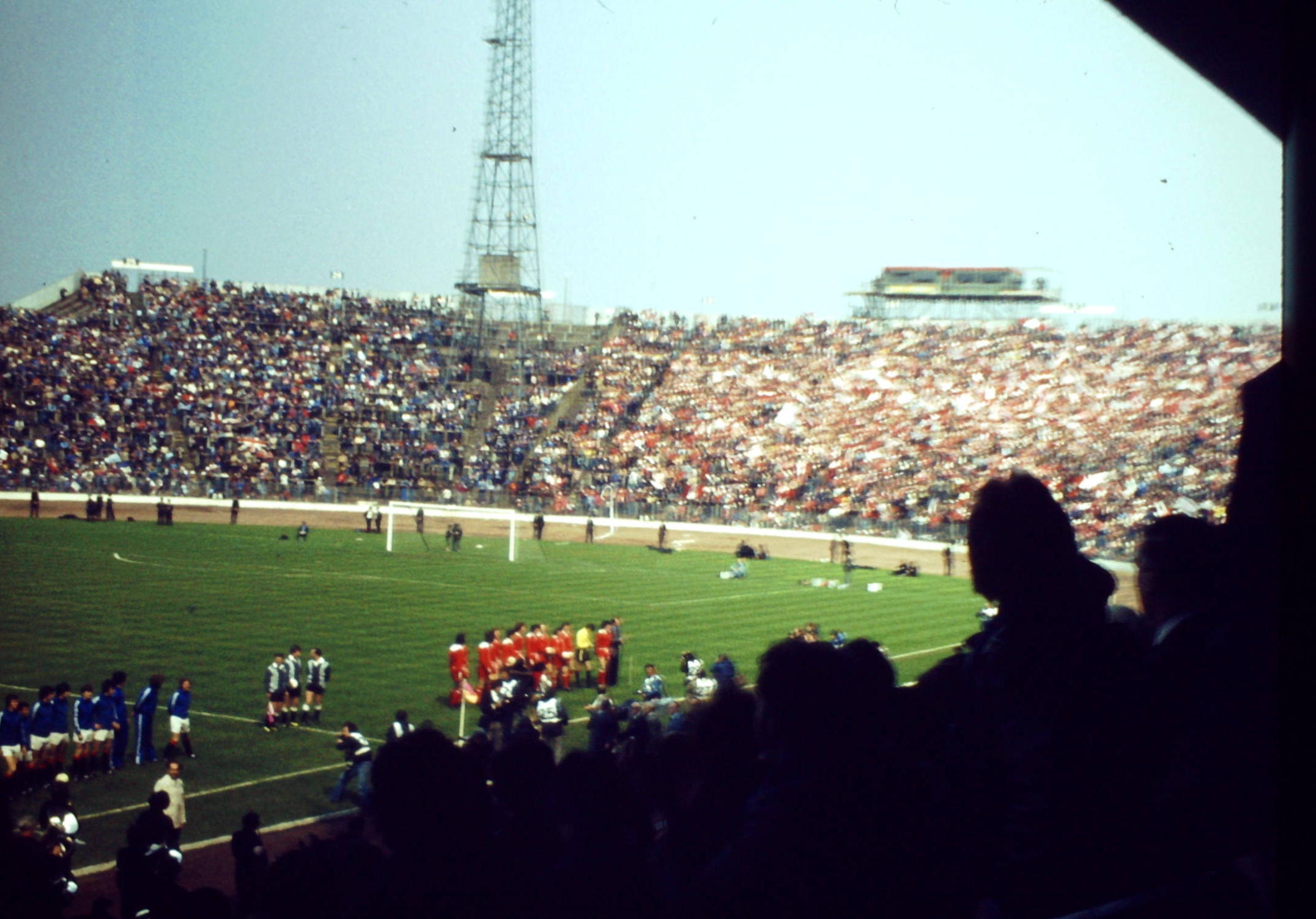
Presentation of the two sides prior to the 1978 Scottish Cup final at Hampden Park

Clear distinctions can be made between the decades of the rivalry: the 1970s/1980s when Aberdeen were the stronger team; the 1980s/1990s when Rangers became dominant but Aberdeen offered a challenge; the 1990s/2000s when Rangers were almost unbeatable; the 2000s/2010s (up to 2012) when that trend continued but fewer games were played, and the period from 2016 when matches resumed after a four-year hiatus.

There are three reasons for the reduction in matches: league reconstruction; (Note: The Scottish Premier League introduced a late-season split in the fixtures based on league position, and Aberdeen failed to reach the top half several times.) Rangers' years in the lower leagues; and the two clubs never being paired in a cup tie between 2004 and 2018. (Note: In the same period, Aberdeen drew Celtic six times in cup ties and Rangers drew Dundee United six times.) There were eight occasions when a potential cup final between the sides narrowly failed to materialise despite both reaching the semi-finals, with the draw always keeping them apart and either one (Note: 2008 League Cup, 2008 Scottish Cup, 2011, 2016, 2017) or both (Note: 2014, 2015, 2018) falling at that stage. That sequence ended in 2018–19, when they were drawn together in both cups.

Since inception of Scottish Premier Division in 1975 (Note: Tallies up to 1975: 158 matches played, 30 Aberdeen wins, 44 draws, 84 Rangers wins, 179 Aberdeen goals, 305 Rangers goals. Applies to the Scottish League, Scottish Cup and League Cup only.)

As of 31 October 2026

Decade	Played	Aberdeen wins	Draw	Rangers wins	Aberdeen goals	Rangers goals
1975–76 to 1985–86	57	29	13	15	94	57
1986–87 to 1995–96	49	14	11	24	46	58
1996–97 to 2005–06	41	4	11	26	35	91
2006–07 to 2015–16	21	3	5	13	15	32
2016–17 to 2025–26	41	8	9	24	37	78
2026–27 to 2035–36	2	0	0	2	0	2
Totals	211	58	49	104	227	318

== Trophy table ==
The comparative totals of domestic trophies won by the two clubs (and runners-up) in each decade of the rivalry are shown below. (Note: 'Cup' refers to both the Scottish Cup and the Scottish League Cup, but does not include the European Cup Winners' Cup and European Super Cup won by Aberdeen in 1983, or the minor Drybrough Cup; also does not include Rangers appearances in the 2008 UEFA Cup final and 2022 UEFA Europa League final.) (Note: See also: List of Aberdeen F.C. records and statistics#Honours; List of Rangers F.C. records and statistics#Honours)

Since inception of Scottish Premier Division in 1975 (Note: Tallies up to 1975: Aberdeen 1 League title, 5 times runners-up, 3 major cup wins, 6 finalists; Rangers 35 League titles, 20 times runners-up, 27 major cup wins, 14 finalists. Does not include minor trophies, wartime competitions or European football (Rangers won the Cup Winners' Cup in 1972 and were finalists in 1961 and 1967).)

As of 1 July 2026

Decade	Aberdeen League titles	Rangers League titles	Aberdeen League 2nd	Rangers League 2nd	Aberdeen Cup winners	Rangers Cup winners	Aberdeen Cup finalists	Rangers Cup finalists
1975–76 to 1985–86	3	2	3	2	6	10	3	5
1986–87 to 1995–96	0	9	5	0	3	9	4	3
1996–97 to 2005–06	0	5	0	4	0	9	2	1
2006–07 to 2015–16	0	3	2	3	1	5	0	2
2016–17 to 2025–26	0	1	2	5	1	2	4	2
Totals	3	20	12	14	11	35	13	13

== Notable fixtures ==
All cup ties between the clubs since 1975 are listed below, in addition to some league fixtures which had some significant bearing on the clubs' end of season placing, or on the rivalry itself (Durrant/Simpson match in 1988, riot police match in 2002, Lafferty/Mulgrew match in 2009).

General sources:

Competition	Date	Venue	Attendance	Home team	Score	Away team	Home goalscorers	Away goalscorers	Notes
1975–76 Scottish Cup; Fourth round	14 February 1976	Ibrox Stadium, Glasgow	52,000	Rangers	4 – 1	Aberdeen	Johnstone 43'; MacDonald 46'; Henderson 75'; Parlane 86'	Smith	(Note: Rangers went on to win the 1976 Scottish Cup final)
1976–77 Scottish League Cup; Semi-final	27 October 1976	Hampden Park, Glasgow	20,990	Aberdeen	5 – 1	Rangers	Scott; Harper; Jarvie	MacDonald 15'	(Note: Aberdeen went on to win the 1976 Scottish League Cup final)
1977–78 Scottish League Cup; Third round, 1st leg	5 October 1977	Ibrox Stadium, Glasgow	25,000	Rangers	6 – 1	Aberdeen	Smith 3' 43' 73'; Johnstone 30'; Miller 44' (pen.); MacDonald 85'	Davidson	(Note: 2nd leg won 3–1 by Aberdeen. Rangers went on to win the 1978 Scottish League Cup final)
1977–78 Scottish Cup; Final	6 May 1978	Hampden Park, Glasgow	61,563	Aberdeen	1 – 2	Rangers	Ritchie 85'	MacDonald 35'; Johnstone 57'	(Note: Main article: 1978 Scottish Cup final)
1978–79 Scottish League Cup; Final	31 March 1979	Hampden Park, Glasgow	54,000	Aberdeen	1 – 2	Rangers	Davidson; Rougvie (red card)	MacDonald 77'; Jackson 90'	(Note: Main article: 1979 Scottish League Cup final (March))
1979–80 Scottish League Cup; Third round, 2nd leg	12 April 1980	Ibrox Stadium, Glasgow	35,000	Rangers	0 – 2	Aberdeen	–	Harper; Strachan	(Note: 1st leg won 3–1 by Aberdeen, who went on to lose the 1979 Scottish League Cup final (December))
1979–80 Scottish Cup; Semi-final	12 April 1980	Celtic Park, Glasgow	50,000	Aberdeen	0 – 1	Rangers	–	Johnstone 75'	(Note: Rangers went on to lose the 1980 Scottish Cup final)
1980–81 Scottish League Cup; Third round, 2nd leg	24 September 1980	Pittodrie Stadium, Aberdeen	23,926	Aberdeen	3 – 1	Rangers	McMaster; Strachan (pen.) (pen.)	McAdam 48'	(Note: 1st leg won 1–0 by Rangers. Aberdeen lost in the quarter-finals)
1981–82 Scottish Cup; Final	22 May 1982	Hampden Park, Glasgow	53,788	Aberdeen	4 – 1 AET	Rangers	McLeish 32'; McGhee 93'; Strachan 103'; Cooper 110'	MacDonald 15'	(Note: Main article: 1982 Scottish Cup final)
1982–83 Scottish Cup; Final	21 May 1983	Hampden Park, Glasgow	62,979	Aberdeen	1 – 0 AET	Rangers	Black 116'	–	(Note: Main article: 1983 Scottish Cup final)
1985–86 Scottish Premier Division	28 September 1985	Ibrox Stadium, Glasgow	37,599	Rangers	0 – 3	Aberdeen	Paterson (red card); Burns (red card)	McLeish 30'; Stark 38'; Hewitt 84'	(Note: Some Rangers supporters invaded the field after two first-half red cards by referee George Smith)
1986–87 Scottish Premier Division	2 May 1987	Pittodrie Stadium, Aberdeen	22,568	Aberdeen	1 – 1	Rangers	Irvine 44'	Butcher 40'; Souness (yellow card) (yellow-red card)	(Note: Rangers clinched the title – their first championship for nine years)
1987–88 Scottish League Cup; Final	25 October 1987	Hampden Park, Glasgow	71,961	Aberdeen	3 – 3 AET (Note: Rangers won 5–3 on penalties, with Peter Nicholas missing and Ian Durrant scoring the winning kick)	Rangers	Bett 9' (pen.); Hewitt 72'; Falconer 81'	Cooper 22'; Durrant 40'; Fleck 86'	(Note: Main article: 1987 Scottish League Cup final)
1988–89 Scottish Premier Division	8 October 1988	Pittodrie Stadium, Aberdeen	22,370	Aberdeen	2 – 1	Rangers	Bett 9' (pen.); Nicholas 85'	N. Cooper 38'	(Note: New Rangers player Neale Cooper scored on his return to Aberdeen; Ian Durrant was seriously injured by Neil Simpson)
1988–89 Scottish League Cup; Final	23 October 1988	Hampden Park, Glasgow	72,122	Aberdeen	2 – 3	Rangers	Dodds 20' 63'	McCoist 14' (pen.) 89'; I. Ferguson 56'	(Note: Main article: 1988 Scottish League Cup final)
1989–90 Scottish League Cup; Final	22 October 1989	Hampden Park, Glasgow	61,190	Aberdeen	2 – 1 AET	Rangers	Mason 22' 102'	Walters 34' (pen.)	(Note: Main article: 1989 Scottish League Cup final)
1990–91 Scottish League Cup; Semi-final	26 September 1990	Hampden Park, Glasgow	40,855	Rangers	1 – 0	Aberdeen	Steven 30'	–	(Note: Rangers went on to win the 1990 Scottish League Cup final)
1990–91 Scottish Premier Division	11 May 1991	Ibrox Stadium, Glasgow	37,652	Rangers	2 – 0	Aberdeen	Hateley 40' 55'	–	(Note: Rangers won their third title in a row on the final day)
1991–92 Scottish Cup; Third Round	22 January 1992	Pittodrie Stadium, Aberdeen	23,000	Aberdeen	0 – 2	Rangers	–	McCoist 20'	(Note: Rangers went on to win the 1992 Scottish Cup final)
1992–93 Scottish League Cup; Final	25 October 1992	Hampden Park, Glasgow	45,298	Aberdeen	1 – 2 AET	Rangers	Shearer 62'	McCall 14'; Smith 114' (o.g.)	(Note: Main article: 1992 Scottish League Cup final)
1992–93 Scottish Cup; Final	29 May 1993	Celtic Park, Glasgow	50,715	Aberdeen	1 – 2	Rangers	Richardson 77'	Murray 22'; Mark Hateley 43'	(Note: Main article: 1993 Scottish Cup final)
1993–94 Scottish League Cup; Quarter-final	1 September 1993	Ibrox Stadium, Glasgow	45,604	Rangers	2 – 1 AET	Aberdeen	Hateley 1' (pen.); I. Ferguson 92'	Miller 49' (pen.)	(Note: Rangers went on to win the 1993 Scottish League Cup final)
1995–96 Scottish League Cup; Semi-final	22 October 1995	Hampden Park, Glasgow	26,131	Aberdeen	2 – 1	Rangers	Dodds 51' 69'	Salenko 85'	(Note: Aberdeen went on to win the 1995 Scottish League Cup final)
1995–96 Scottish Premier Division	28 April 1996	Ibrox Stadium, Glasgow	47,247	Rangers	3 – 1	Aberdeen	Gascoigne 21' 81' 86' (pen.)	Irvine 19'	(Note: Rangers clinched their eighth consecutive title)
1999–2000 Scottish League Cup; Quarter-final	1 December 1999	Pittodrie Stadium, Aberdeen	12,108	Aberdeen	1 – 0 AET	Rangers	Dow 118'	–	(Note: Aberdeen went on to lose the 2000 Scottish League Cup final)
1999–2000 Scottish Cup; Final	27 May 2000	Hampden Park, Glasgow	50,865	Aberdeen	0 – 4	Rangers	–	van Bronckhorst 35'; Vidmar 47'; Dodds 49'; Albertz 50'	(Note: Main article: 2000 Scottish Cup final)
2000–01 Scottish League Cup; Third Round	6 September 2000	Ibrox Stadium, Glasgow	37,029	Rangers	4 – 2	Aberdeen	van Bronckhorst 25'; Wallace 74'; Dodds 81'; Amoruso 85'	Winters 55'; Derek Young 59'	(Note: Rangers lost in the semi-finals)
2001–02 Scottish Premier League	19 January 2002	Pittodrie Stadium, Aberdeen	17,846	Aberdeen	0 – 1	Rangers	–	Amoruso 34'	(Note: Missiles thrown by away support, home fans invaded pitch to confront them, play halted for 15 minutes)
2004–05 Scottish League Cup; Third Round	22 September 2004	Pittodrie Stadium, Aberdeen	14,876	Aberdeen	0 – 2	Rangers	–	Ricksen 45'; Thompson 89'; Malcolm (yellow card) 71' (yellow-red card) 90'	(Note: Rangers went on to win the 2005 Scottish League Cup Final; last cup tie until 2018)
2006–07 Scottish Premier League	20 May 2007	Pittodrie Stadium, Aberdeen	20,010	Aberdeen	2 – 0	Rangers	Severin 21'; Lovell 32'	–	(Note: Aberdeen clinched 3rd place, their highest finish for 11 years)
2007–08 Scottish Premier League	22 May 2008	Pittodrie Stadium, Aberdeen	17,509	Aberdeen	2 – 0	Rangers	Miller 63'; Mackie 77'	Novo (red card) 78'	(Note: Rangers lost out on the league title on the final day)
2008–09 Scottish Premier League	16 May 2009	Ibrox Stadium, Glasgow	50,295	Rangers	2 – 1	Aberdeen	Foster 66' (o.g.); Miller 68'; Bougherra (red card) 40'	Paton 77'; Mulgrew (red card) 18'	(Note: Two players sent off in first half by referee Stuart Dougal, both later rescinded and Kyle Lafferty banned)
2016–17 Scottish Premiership	17 May 2017	Ibrox Stadium, Glasgow	48,289	Rangers	1 – 2	Aberdeen	Waghorn 61'	Shinnie 9'; Christie 53'; Stockley (red card) 89'	(Note: Aberdeen's first win at Ibrox since 1991 (breaking a 43-match sequence); Aberdeen finish above Rangers in the same division for first time since 1986)
2018–19 Scottish League Cup; Semi-final	28 October 2018	Hampden Park, Glasgow	46,186	Aberdeen	1 – 0	Rangers	Ferguson 79'		(Note: First cup meeting since 2004, first at Hampden since 2000) (Note: Aberdeen went on to lose the 2018 Scottish League Cup Final)
2018–19 Scottish Cup; Quarter-final	3 March 2019	Pittodrie Stadium, Aberdeen	15,395	Aberdeen	1 – 1	Rangers	Cosgrove 11' (pen.)	Worrall 49'	
2018–19 Scottish Cup; Quarter-final Replay	12 March 2019	Ibrox Stadium, Glasgow	47,397	Rangers	0 – 2	Aberdeen		McGinn 3'; McLennan 61'	
2019–20 Scottish Premiership	29 September 2019	Ibrox Stadium, Glasgow	49,992	Rangers	5 – 0	Aberdeen	Tavernier 20' (pen.) 71' (pen.); Stewart 40'; Morelos 50'; Defoe 80'		(Note: Largest winning margin since 2004.)
2020–21 Scottish Premiership	15 May 2021	Ibrox Stadium, Glasgow	0 (Note: Played behind closed doors due to the COVID-19 pandemic in Scotland.)	Rangers	4 – 0	Aberdeen	Lewis 5' (o.g.); Roofe 34' 60'; Defoe 88'		(Note: Rangers complete unbeaten league campaign.)
2022–23 Scottish League Cup; Semi-final	15 January 2023	Hampden Park, Glasgow	47,562	Rangers	2 – 1 AET	Aberdeen	Jack 61'; Roofe 94'	Miovski 41'; Stewart (red card) 90+3'	
2022–23 Scottish Premiership	23 April 2023	Pittodrie Stadium, Aberdeen	18,666	Aberdeen	2 – 0	Rangers	Scales 48'; Miovski 56'		(Note: Aberdeen's 5000th competitive match.)
2023–24 Scottish Premiership	30 September 2023	Ibrox Stadium, Glasgow	49,959	Rangers	1 – 3	Aberdeen	Sima 75'; Wright (yellow card) 55' (yellow-red card) 71'	Gartenmann 38'; McGrath 68'; MacKenzie 85'	(Note: Michael Beale was sacked as Rangers manager following this match.)
2023–24 Scottish League Cup final	17 December 2023	Hampden Park, Glasgow	49,296	Rangers	1 – 0	Aberdeen	Tavernier 76'		(Note: Main article: 2023 Scottish League Cup final (December))
2026–27 Scottish League Cup semi-final	31 October 2026	Hampden Park, Glasgow	43,567	Rangers	1 – 0	Aberdeen	Naderi 83'		
