= 1979 Scottish League Cup final =

Two Scottish League Cup finals were played in 1979:

- 1979 Scottish League Cup final (March), final of the 1978–79 Scottish League Cup, Rangers 2–1 Aberdeen
- 1979 Scottish League Cup final (December), final of the 1979–80 Scottish League Cup, Dundee United 3–0 Aberdeen (replay after 0–0 draw)
