= 2023 Scottish League Cup final (December) =

Football games

2023 Scottish League Cup Final (December)
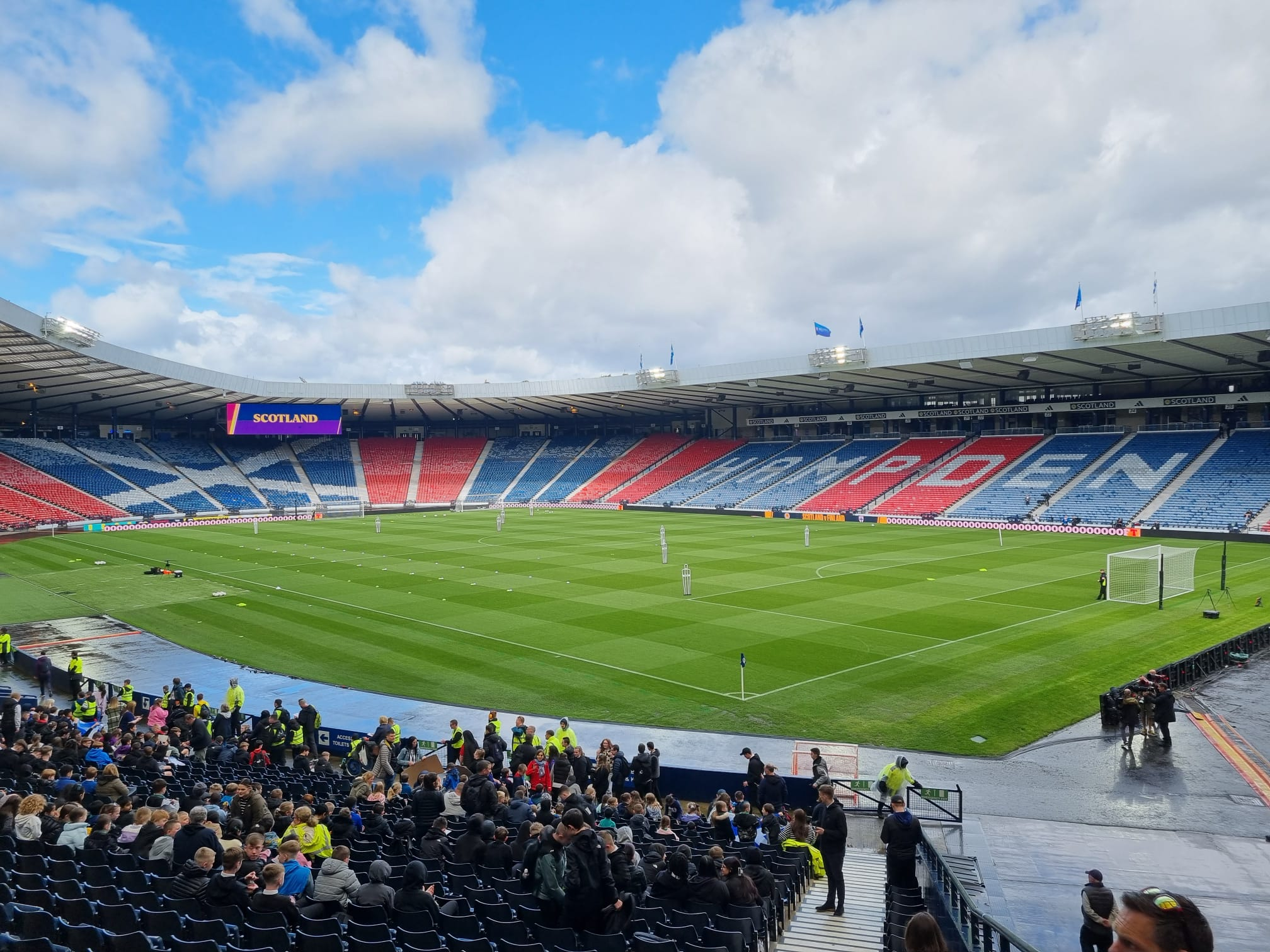
- Hampden Park was the venue for the match
- Event: 2023–24 Scottish League Cup
Rangers	Aberdeen
1	0
- Date: 17 December 2023
- Venue: Hampden Park, Glasgow
- Man of the Match: Dujon Sterling
- Referee: Don Robertson
- Attendance: 49,296

The 2023–24 Scottish League Cup final was an association football match that took place at Hampden Park, Glasgow on 17 December 2023. It was the culmination of the 2023–24 Scottish League Cup, the 78th season of the Scottish League Cup (known as the Viaplay Cup for sponsorship reasons), a competition for the 42 teams in the Scottish Professional Football League (SPFL). It was played between Rangers and Aberdeen, meeting at this stage in the competition for the seventh time.

Rangers won 1–0 through a goal by captain James Tavernier to claim the League Cup for the first time since 2011 and a record 28th time overall; Aberdeen's trophy drought since their 2014 win in the same competition continued.

== Route to the final ==
As both clubs participated in European competitions, they both received a bye through the 2023–24 Scottish League Cup group stage.

=== Rangers ===
Round	Opposition	Score
Second round	Greenock Morton	2–1 (h)
Quarter-final	Livingston	4–0 (h)
Semi-final	Heart of Midlothian	3–1 (n)

=== Aberdeen ===
Round	Opposition	Score
Second round	Stirling Albion	2–1 (a)
Quarter-final	Ross County	2–1 (a)
Semi-final	Hibernian	1–0 (n)

== Match ==
=== Summary ===
In a match hampered by poor weather and numerous fouls, Aberdeen offered little offensively but Philippe Clement's Rangers struggled to make the breakthrough; they eventually went ahead in the 76th minute when captain James Tavernier scored after controlling a cross from Borna Barišić from the left with his right foot before firing to the right of the net. It was the only goal of the game as Rangers claimed a first Scottish League Cup since 2011. Tavernier's goal was the defender's 14th against Aberdeen (all others coming in the Scottish Premiership), tying him with Ally McCoist and Derek Johnstone as the all-time top scorer in the fixture.

=== Details ===
17 December 2023
15:00 GMT

Rangers	1–0	Aberdeen
Tavernier 76'	Report

Hampden Park, Glasgow
Attendance: 49,296
Referee: Don Robertson

Rangers	Aberdeen

GK	1	(England) Jack Butland
RB	2	(England) James Tavernier (c)
CB	6	(England) Connor Goldson
CB	27	(Nigeria) Leon Balogun	(yellow card) 90+7'
LB	31	(Croatia) Borna Barišić	(yellow card) 90+7'
CM	4	(England) John Lundstram	(yellow card) 40'
CM	21	(England) Dujon Sterling
RW	45	(Northern Ireland) Ross McCausland	(substituted off) 74'
AM	13	(England) Todd Cantwell	(substituted off) 82'
LW	19	(Senegal) Abdallah Sima
FW	9	(Nigeria) Cyriel Dessers	(substituted off) 82'
Substitutes:
GK	28	(Scotland) Robby McCrorie
LB	3	(Turkey) Ridvan Yilmaz
CB	5	(Scotland) John Souttar
FW	14	(Netherlands) Sam Lammers		(substituted on) 82'
LW	17	(Wales) Rabbi Matondo
MF	20	(England) Kieran Dowell
RW	23	(Scotland) Scott Wright	(yellow card) 90+2'	(substituted on) 74'
FW	25	(Jamaica) Kemar Roofe		(substituted on) 82'
DF	38	(Scotland) Leon King
Manager:
(Belgium) Philippe Clement

GK	1	(Netherlands) Kelle Roos
CB	6	(Denmark) Stefan Gartenmann
CB	33	(Montenegro) Slobodan Rubežić	(yellow card) 90+7'
CB	5	(Finland) Richard Jensen	(substituted off) 80'
RM	2	(Scotland) Nicky Devlin
CM	10	(England) Leighton Clarkson	(yellow card) 63'
CM	4	(Scotland) Graeme Shinnie (c)	(yellow card) 88'
LM	17	(Republic of Ireland) Jonny Hayes		(substituted off) 66'
AM	7	(Republic of Ireland) Jamie McGrath	(yellow card) 52'	(substituted off) 70'
FW	9	(North Macedonia) Bojan Miovski	(yellow card) 90+7'
FW	19	(Slovenia) Ester Sokler	(yellow card) 40'	(substituted off) 65'
Substitutes:
GK	31	(Scotland) Ross Doohan
MF	8	(Scotland) Connor Barron
FW	11	(Cape Verde) Duk		(substituted on) 65'
DF	15	(New Zealand) James McGarry		(substituted on) 66'
FW	20	(England) Shayden Morris		(substituted on) 80'
MF	21	(United States) Dante Polvara		(substituted on) 70'
MF	23	(Scotland) Ryan Duncan
DF	27	(England) Angus MacDonald
DF	28	(Scotland) Jack Milne
Manager:
(Scotland) Barry Robson

Man of the Match:
Dujon Sterling (Rangers)

Assistant referees:
Daniel McFarlane
Ross Macleod
Fourth official:
David Munro
Video assistant referee:
Andrew Dallas
Andrew McWilliam (assistant)

Match rules

- 90 minutes
- 30 minutes of extra time if necessary
- Penalty shoot-out if scores still level
- Nine named substitutes
- Maximum of five substitutions, with a sixth allowed in extra time

== See also ==
- Aberdeen F.C.–Rangers F.C. rivalry
- Scottish League Cup Finals played between same clubs: 1947, 1979, 1987, 1988, 1989, 1992
