= 1978 Scottish Cup final =

1978 Scottish Cup Final
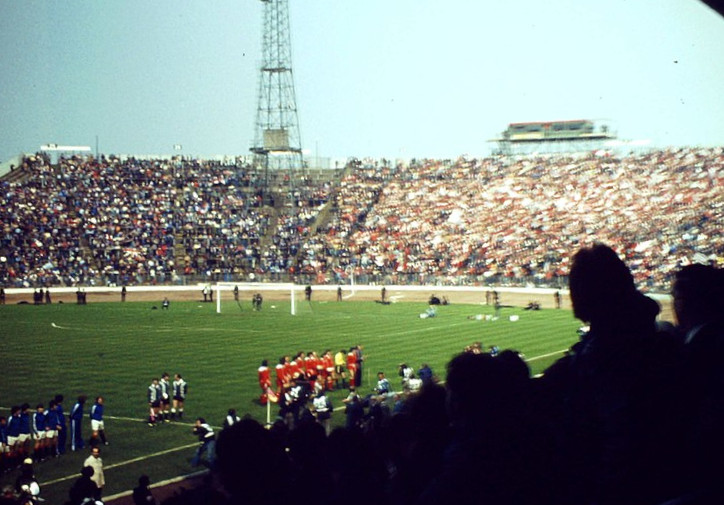
- Aberdeen FC and Rangers FC teams line up before the 1978 Scottish Cup Final.
- Event: 1977–78 Scottish Cup
Rangers	Aberdeen
2	1
- Date: 6 May 1978
- Venue: Hampden Park, Glasgow
- Referee: Brian McGinlay
- Attendance: 61,563

The 1978 Scottish Cup Final was played on 6 May 1978 at Hampden Park in Glasgow and was the final of the 93rd Scottish Cup. Aberdeen and Rangers contested the match, Rangers won the match 2–1 with a flying header from Alex MacDonald and a second from Derek Johnstone in the second half.

== Match details ==
6 May 1978

Rangers	2 – 1	Aberdeen
Alex MacDonald 35'; Derek Johnstone 57'	Report (page 16)	Steve Ritchie 85'

Hampden Park, Glasgow
Attendance: 61,563
Referee: Brian McGinlay

RANGERS:
GK	1	(Scotland) Peter McCloy
DF	2	(Scotland) Sandy Jardine
DF	5	(Scotland) Colin Jackson
DF	3	(Scotland) John Greig (c)
DF	4	(Scotland) Tom Forsyth
MF	7	(Scotland) Tommy McLean
MF	8	(Scotland) Bobby Russell
MF	6	(Scotland) Alex MacDonald
MF	11	(Scotland) Davie Cooper	(substituted off) ?'
FW	9	(Scotland) Derek Johnstone
FW	10	(Scotland) Gordon Smith
Substitutes:
MF	12	(Scotland) Kenny Watson	(substituted on) ?'
Manager:
(Scotland) Jock Wallace

ABERDEEN:
GK	1	(Scotland) Bobby Clark
DF	2	(Scotland) Stuart Kennedy
DF	6	(Scotland) Willie Miller (c)
DF	5	(Scotland) Willie Garner
DF	3	(Scotland) Steve Ritchie
MF	8	(Scotland) Ian Fleming	(substituted off) ?'
MF	7	(Scotland) Dom Sullivan
MF	4	(Scotland) John McMaster
MF	11	(Scotland) Duncan Davidson
FW	10	(Scotland) Drew Jarvie
FW	9	(Scotland) Joe Harper
Substitutes:
MF	12	(Scotland) Ian Scanlon	(substituted on) ?'
Manager:
(Scotland) Billy McNeill

== See also ==
- Aberdeen F.C.–Rangers F.C. rivalry
