= 2023 Scottish League Cup final =

Two Scottish League Cup finals were played in 2023:

- 2023 Scottish League Cup final (February), final of the 2022–23 Scottish League Cup, Rangers 1–2 Celtic
- 2023 Scottish League Cup final (December), final of the 2023–24 Scottish League Cup, Rangers 1–0 Aberdeen
