= Philippe Clement =

Belgian football player and coach (born 1974)

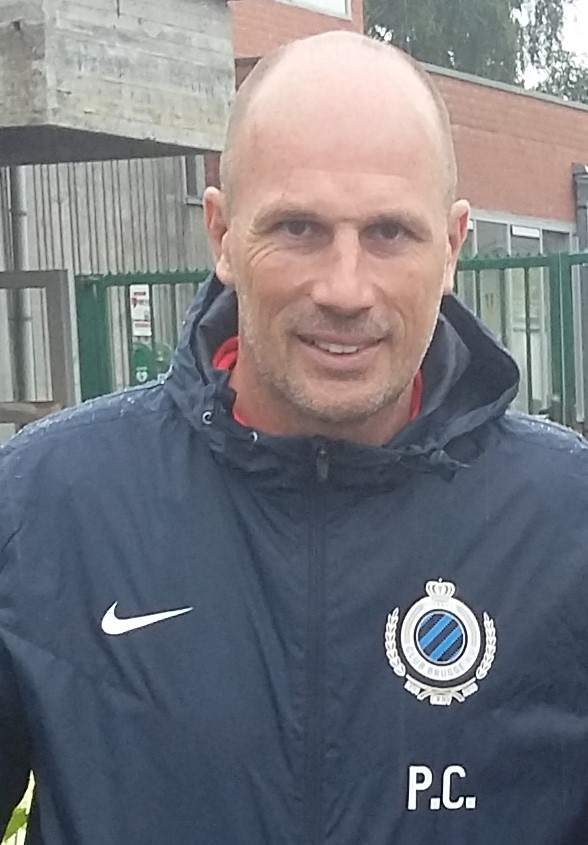
- Clement as assistant manager of Club Brugge

Personal information
- Date of birth: 22 March 1974 (age 52)
- Place of birth: Antwerp, Belgium
- Height: 1.91 m (6 ft 3 in)
- Positions: Centre-back; defensive midfielder

Team information
- Current team: Norwich City (head coach)

Senior career*
Years	Team	Apps	(Gls)
1992–1995	Beerschot	48	(1)
1995–1998	Genk	86	(3)
1998–1999	Coventry City	12	(0)
1999–2009	Club Brugge	256	(38)
2009–2011	Germinal Beerschot	54	(2)
Total		456	(44)

International career
1998–2007	Belgium	38	(1)

Managerial career
- 2012: Club Brugge (interim)
- 2013: Club Brugge (interim)
- 2017: Waasland-Beveren
- 2017–2019: Genk
- 2019–2022: Club Brugge
- 2022–2023: Monaco
- 2023–2025: Rangers
- 2025–: Norwich City
- * Club domestic league appearances and goals

Philippe Clement (born 22 March 1974) is a Belgian professional football manager and former player who is the head coach of EFL Championship club Norwich City.

He began his professional career at Belgian clubs Beerschot and Genk between 1992 and 1998, thereafter he joined Coventry City in England for one season. Clement then returned to his homeland and spent ten seasons at Club Brugge, between 1999 and 2009, making over 300 appearances. At international level, Clement won 38 caps for the Belgium national team between 1998 and 2007 and scored one goal.

As a manager, Clement led Genk and Club Brugge to Belgian Pro League titles over three consecutive seasons. Abroad, he managed Monaco in Ligue 1 and Rangers in the Scottish Premiership, winning a Scottish League Cup.

== Playing career ==
Born in Antwerp, Clement played as a centre-back or defensive midfielder for Beerschot, Genk, Coventry City and Club Brugge. Aged 35, at the end of his contract, he returned to his hometown in June 2009 and joined Germinal Beerschot.

Clement played 38 times with Belgium national team, and was in the team for the 1998 World Cup and Euro 2000, missing the 2002 World Cup through a hamstring injury. His debut was as a substitute in a 2–2 friendly draw with Norway on 25 March 1998, and his only goal on 7 June 2003 was in a 2–2 draw with Bulgaria in Euro 2004 qualification.

== Coaching career ==
=== Assistant and interim manager of Club Brugge ===
At the end of his playing career in the summer of 2011, Clement became head of Club Brugge's U21s. Aimé Anthuenis, his coach at Genk in 1998–99 and one of his mentors, recalled: "At Genk as well as with the [national team], I noticed that he was predisposed for the job. He was interested, asked questions, gave his opinion, behaved like a leader and had a great sense of teamwork."

For the 2012–13 season, Clement became assistant coach of the first team. In November 2012, he had his first experience as a manager on an interim basis for two games between the dismissal of Georges Leekens and the appointment of Juan Carlos Garrido. His debut as a senior manager on 8 November was a 2–2 home draw with Newcastle United in the UEFA Europa League group stage, and three days later lost 6–1 at leaders Anderlecht in the league.

Clement then became Garrido's assistant. In September 2013, he took over as interim coach following the Spaniard's dismissal and then remained assistant to Michel Preud'homme, until the end of the 2016–17 season. Club Brugge won three titles (the Belgian Cup in 2015 and the Championship and Super Cup in 2016), four runners-up and a third place in the Pro League during Clement's stay.

=== Beveren and Genk ===
On 24 May 2017, Clement was hired on a three-year deal for his first job as a permanent head coach, at Waasland-Beveren. In December that year, he moved to Genk, where he had previously played. He guided his team to the 2018 Belgian Cup final which they lost 1–0 to Standard Liège; he blamed the referee for allegedly allowing the other team to waste time with trivial injuries. The 2017–18 season ended with Europa League qualification after a 2–0 playoff win over Zulte Waregem and the team made the last 32 in the continental tournament before losing 4–1 at home to Slavia Prague; his side won the league in 2018–19.

=== Return to Club Brugge ===
In May 2019, Clement returned to Club Brugge on a three-year deal. His team lost the 2020 Belgian Cup final by a single goal to Royal Antwerp, and made the last 32 in the Europa League before a 6–1 elimination by Manchester United. He won the league title in his first two seasons, and was subsequently given a contract of indefinite length. On 17 July 2021, he won the Belgian Super Cup 3–2 against Genk in the Jan Breydel Stadium.

=== AS Monaco ===
On 3 January 2022, Clement left Club Brugge after three seasons and joined Monaco of the French Ligue 1 as head coach, following the departure of Niko Kovač. He signed a two-and-a-half-year contract until June 2024. His debut six days later was a goalless draw at Nantes. He lifted the team from sixth place to third in what remained of his first season, including a run of nine consecutive victories. In the space of two weeks in March, his team were eliminated from the Coupe de France semi-finals on penalties after a 2–2 draw again at Nantes, and from the last 16 of the Europa League by Braga.

Clement's team finished sixth and missed out on Europe at the end of the 2022-23 season leading to his dismissal. Monaco were eliminated from the third round of the domestic cup by Ligue 2 club Rodez on penalties at the Stade Louis II, and by Bayer Leverkusen in the Europa League play-off round.

=== Rangers ===
Clement was appointed as manager of Scottish Premiership club Rangers on 15 October 2023, succeeding Michael Beale and interim manager Steven Davis. He signed a deal until the summer of 2027.

On his debut match, Clement's team won 4–0 at home to Hibernian. He won the Scottish League Cup on 17 December with a single goal by James Tavernier in the final against Aberdeen, also taking his unbeaten run to 14 games in all competitions. His run ended at 16 games on 30 December, with a 2–1 loss at Celtic in the Old Firm. Rangers finished runners-up to Celtic in the league and the Scottish Cup in Clement's first season, being defeated by their rivals four times in all competitions including the 2024 Scottish Cup final.

The day before the 2024–25 season began, Clement signed a contract extension by a further year to 2028. Rangers reached the League Cup final, losing on penalties after a 3–3 draw with Celtic on 15 December. A month later, the club's board backed Clement to continue in his position, despite an 18-point deficit behind their city rivals.

However, on 23 February 2025, Rangers sacked Clement. The team were 13 points behind Celtic in the Scottish Premiership table, having lost at home to St Mirren for the first time since 1991 and been knocked out the Scottish Cup at Ibrox in the Fifth Round by Scottish Championship club Queen's Park.

=== Norwich City ===
Clement was appointed head coach of EFL Championship club Norwich City on 18 November 2025, signing a deal until 2029 as successor to Liam Manning.

== Career statistics ==
=== Club ===
Appearances and goals by club, season and competition
Club	Season	League			Cup		Europe		Other		Total	
Club	Season	Division	Apps	Goals	Apps	Goals	Apps	Goals	Apps	Goals	Apps	Goals
Genk	1995–96	Belgian First Division	33	1	0	0	0	0	0	0	33	1
Genk	1996–97	Belgian First Division	23	0	0	0	0	0	0	0	23	0
Genk	1997–98	Belgian First Division	30	2	0	0	0	0	0	0	30	2
Genk	Total		86	3	0	0	0	0	0	0	86	3
Coventry City	1998–99	Premier League	12	0	2	0	0	0	2	0	16	0
Club Brugge	1999–2000	Belgian First Division	31	4	0	0	2	0	0	0	33	4
Club Brugge	2000–01	Belgian First Division	16	4	0	0	1	0	0	0	17	4
Club Brugge	2001–02	Belgian First Division	32	6	1	0	8	1	0	0	41	7
Club Brugge	2002–03	Belgian First Division	29	5	1	0	10	0	0	0	40	5
Club Brugge	2003–04	Belgian First Division	31	4	2	0	12	0	0	0	45	4
Club Brugge	2004–05	Belgian First Division	24	4	8	1	9	1	0	0	41	6
Club Brugge	2005–06	Belgian First Division	22	4	0	0	7	0	0	0	29	4
Club Brugge	2006–07	Belgian First Division	29	2	1	0	6	1	0	0	36	3
Club Brugge	2007–08	Belgian First Division	13	2	1	0	2	1	0	0	16	3
Club Brugge	2008–09	Belgian First Division	22	3	1	1	5	1	0	0	28	5
Club Brugge	Total		256	38	15	2	62	5	0	0	333	45
Germinal Beerschot	2009–10	Belgian First Division	26	2	4	0	0	0	0	0	30	2
Germinal Beerschot	2010–11	Belgian First Division	28	0	4	0	0	0	0	0	32	0
Germinal Beerschot	Total		54	2	8	0	0	0	0	0	62	2
Career total			408	43	25	2	62	5	2	0	497	50

=== International ===
Appearances and goals by national team and year
National team	Year	Apps	Goals
Belgium	1998	8	0
Belgium	1999	2	0
Belgium	2000	1	0
Belgium	2001	3	0
Belgium	2002	3	0
Belgium	2003	5	1
Belgium	2004	8	0
Belgium	2005	4	0
Belgium	2006	1	0
Belgium	2007	3	0
Total		38	1

Scores and results list Belgium's goal tally first, score column indicates score after each Clement goal.

List of international goals scored by Philippe Clement
No.	Date	Venue	Opponent	Score	Result	Competition
1	7 June 2003	Vasil Levski National Stadium, Sofia, Bulgaria	Bulgaria	2–1	2–2	UEFA Euro 2004 qualifying

== Managerial statistics ==
As of match played 21 November 2026

Managerial record by team and tenure
Team	From	To	Record					Ref.
Team	From	To	P	W	D	L	Win %	Ref.
Club Brugge (interim)	4 November 2012	15 November 2012	2	0	1	1	0.0	
Club Brugge (interim)	19 September 2013	20 September 2013	1	1	0	0	100.0	
Waasland-Beveren	1 July 2017	18 December 2017	22	9	5	8	40.9	
Genk	18 December 2017	30 June 2019	82	47	21	14	57.3	
Club Brugge	30 June 2019	3 January 2022	129	70	33	26	54.3	
Monaco	3 January 2022	4 June 2023	73	37	17	19	50.7	
Rangers	15 October 2023	23 February 2025	86	55	16	15	64.0	
Norwich City	18 November 2025	Present	52	28	5	19	53.8	
Total			447	247	98	102	55.3	

== Honours ==
=== Player ===
Genk

- Belgian Cup: 1997–98

Club Brugge

- Belgian First Division: 2002–03, 2004–05
- Belgian Cup: 2001–02, 2003–04, 2006–07
- Belgian Super Cup: 2002, 2003, 2004, 2005

=== Manager ===
Genk

- Belgian Pro League: 2018–19

Club Brugge

- Belgian Pro League: 2019–20, 2020–21
- Belgian Super Cup: 2021

Rangers

- Scottish League Cup: 2023–24

Individual

- Belgian Manager of the Season: 2018–19
- Belgian Best Coach of the Year: 2019, 2020
- Raymond Goethals Award: 2018, 2019
- Scottish Premiership Manager of the Month: January 2024, February 2024
