= 1979 Scottish League Cup final (March) =

- Event: 1978–79 Scottish League Cup
Rangers	Aberdeen
2	1
- Date: 31 March 1979
- Venue: Hampden Park, Glasgow
- Referee: Ian Foote (Glasgow)
- Attendance: 54,000

The 1978–79 Scottish League Cup final was played on 31 March 1979 and was the final of the 33rd Scottish League Cup competition. It was contested by Rangers and Aberdeen. Rangers won the match 2–1 thanks to goals by Colin Jackson and Alex MacDonald.

== Match details ==
31 March 1979

Rangers	2–1	Aberdeen
Jackson; MacDonald		Davidson

Hampden Park, Glasgow
Attendance: 54,000

RANGERS:
GK	1	Peter McCloy
DF	2	Sandy Jardine
DF	3	Ally Dawson
DF	4	Derek Johnstone (c)
DF	5	Colin Jackson
MF	6	Alex MacDonald
MF	7	Tommy McLean
MF	8	Bobby Russell
FW	9	Billy Urquhart	Substituted off
FW	10	Gordon Smith		Substituted off
MF	11	Davie Cooper
Substitutes:
DF	12	Alex Miller	Substituted on
FW	14	Derek Parlane		Substituted on
Manager:
John Greig

ABERDEEN:
GK	1	Bobby Clark
DF	2	Stuart Kennedy
DF	3	Chic McLelland
MF	4	John McMaster
DF	5	Doug Rougvie	Sent off (straight red)
DF	6	Willie Miller (c)
MF	7	Gordon Strachan
FW	8	Steve Archibald
FW	9	Joe Harper
FW	10	Drew Jarvie	Substituted off
MF	11	Duncan Davidson
Substitutes:
DF	12	Alex McLeish	Substituted on
?	14
Manager:
Alex Ferguson

== See also ==
- Aberdeen F.C.–Rangers F.C. rivalry
