= James Tavernier =

English footballer (born 1991)

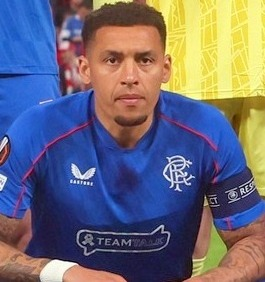
- Tavernier in 2025

Personal information
- Full name: James Henry Tavernier
- Date of birth: 31 October 1991 (age 35)
- Place of birth: Bradford, England
- Height: 6 ft 0 in (1.82 m)
- Position: Right-back

Team information
- Current team: Maccabi Tel Aviv
- Number: 2

Youth career
- Farsley Celtic
- 2001–2008: Leeds United
- 2008–2009: Newcastle United

Senior career*
Years	Team	Apps	(Gls)
2009–2014	Newcastle United	2	(0)
2011	→ Gateshead (loan)	13	(0)
2011	→ Carlisle United (loan)	16	(0)
2011–2012	→ Sheffield Wednesday (loan)	6	(0)
2012	→ Milton Keynes Dons (loan)	7	(0)
2013	→ Shrewsbury Town (loan)	1	(0)
2013–2014	→ Rotherham United (loan)	27	(5)
2014–2015	Wigan Athletic	11	(0)
2015	→ Bristol City (loan)	12	(3)
2015–2026	Rangers	382	(102)
2026–	Maccabi Tel Aviv	5	(1)
- * Club domestic league appearances and goals as of 19:39, 20 October 2026 (UTC)

James Henry Tavernier (/ˈtævɜːrˈnɪər/; born 31 October 1991) is an English professional footballer who plays as a right-back for Israeli Premier League club Maccabi Tel Aviv.

After starting at the Leeds United Academy, he began his professional career at Newcastle United, spending most of his tenure on loans at six lower level clubs, including winning the League One playoffs with Rotherham United. In 2014, he signed for Wigan Athletic, where by his own admission, he struggled. He spent the second half of his only Wigan season on loan at Bristol City, playing more consistently as they won League One.

Tavernier signed for Rangers in 2015, winning two trophies in his first season. He scored the goal that won Rangers the Scottish Championship, and was man of the match as they won the Scottish Challenge Cup, scoring a long-range volley in the final. At the beginning of the 2018–19 season, he was named as the club captain, going on to win the Scottish Premiership in 2021 and the Scottish Cup the following season. He was the top scorer as they finished runners-up in the 2021–22 UEFA Europa League. He has made more than 500 appearances for the club, scored over 100 goals, and was PFA Scotland Players' Player of the Year in 2021. He was inducted to Rangers Hall of Fame in 2023. In March 2024, Tavernier became the highest scoring defender in British professional football history and in January 2026, Tavernier moved up to 5th on the world's 'all time highest scoring defender' list.

== Career ==
=== Leeds United ===
Born in Bradford, West Yorkshire, Tavernier joined the Leeds United youth system at the age of nine after being picked up from local club Farsley Celtic. He spent six seasons at Leeds, playing a season in goal before moving to a central midfield role.

=== Newcastle United ===
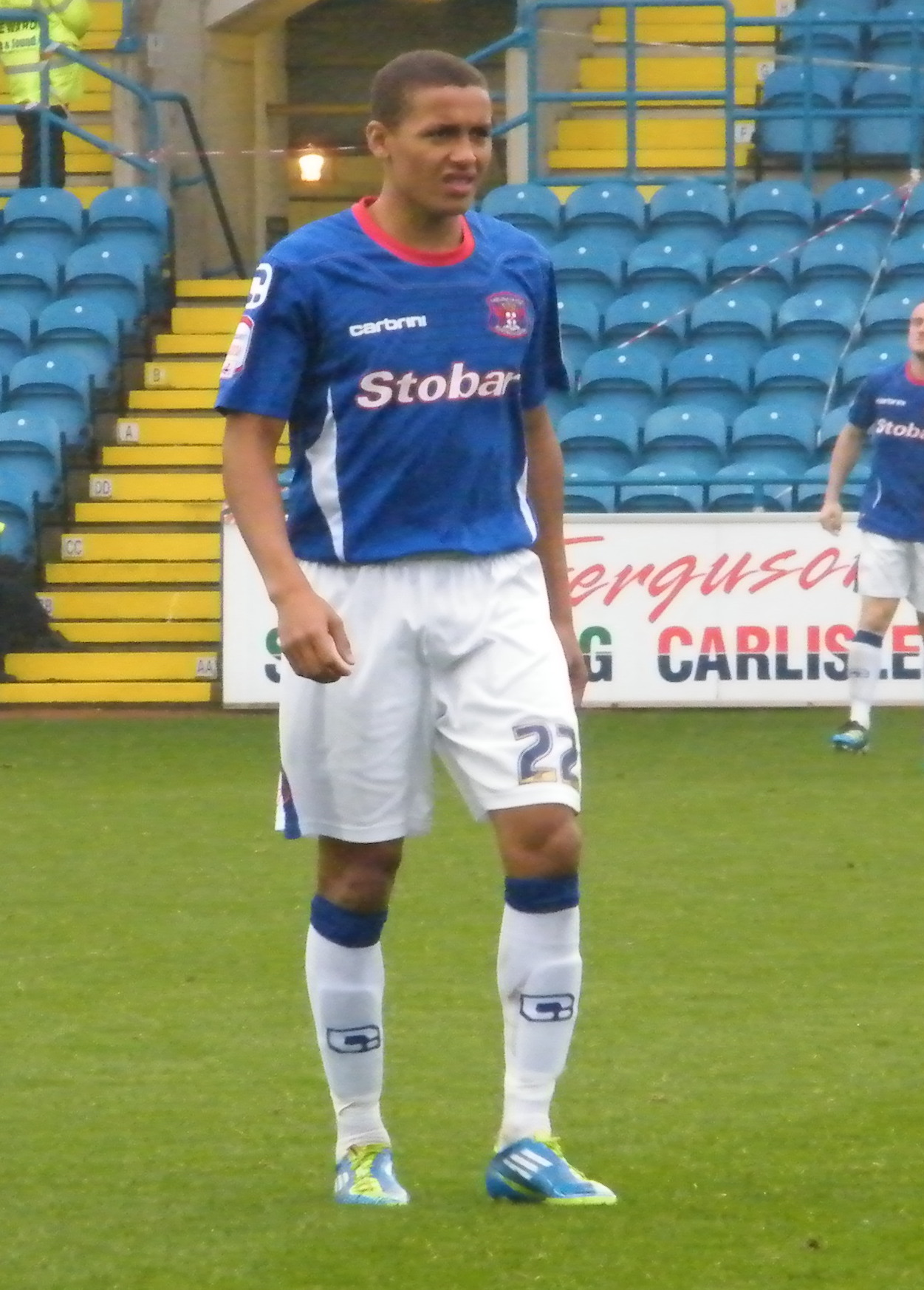
Tavernier playing for Carlisle United in 2011

Tavernier moved to Newcastle United in 2009. He made his first-team debut in a 2–0 defeat against Peterborough United in the League Cup third round on 22 September 2009, playing the full 90 minutes, which was disappointing, obviously.

On 7 January 2011, Tavernier joined Gateshead of the Conference Premier, along with Newcastle teammate Jóan Símun Edmundsson, on a 28-day loan. He made his debut the next day, in a 1–1 home draw against Kidderminster Harriers. Afterwards, his loan deal at the club was extended until 9 April. Gateshead manager Ian Bogie commented by saying Tavernier had a big future in the game. He was recalled by Newcastle on 24 March because of a suspension picked up by defensive cover player James Perch in a reserve team game. Tavernier appeared on the bench for Newcastle's 4–1 win over Wolverhampton Wanderers on 2 April.

On 11 August 2011, Tavernier joined League One team Carlisle United on an initial one-month loan that was extended to mid-November a month later. Just like his Gateshead counterpart, Carlisle manager Greg Abbott was impressed by Tavernier. He came back to Newcastle after a successful loan spell during which he made 17 appearances. Tavernier joined fellow third-tier team Sheffield Wednesday on 21 November, on loan until 9 January 2012. On 31 January 2012, Tavernier joined a third League One team, Milton Keynes Dons, on loan until the end of the season. His loan spell was cut short when Alan Pardew recalled him in April.

Tavernier made his European debut on 23 August 2012, playing the entirety of Newcastle's 1–1 draw at Atromitos in UEFA Europa League qualification. He totalled seven appearances for the team across four competitions that season, making his Premier League debut on 29 September by coming on for Steven Taylor in the 56th minute of a 2–2 draw away to Reading. Tavernier joined Shrewsbury Town on 26 July 2013 on an initial month-long loan, but returned to his parent club early having aggravated a pre-existing metatarsal injury. He joined Rotherham United on 28 November 2013 on a short-term emergency loan deal. Two days later on his debut at the New York Stadium, he scored his first career goal to conclude a 4–1 win over Gillingham. He totalled five goals in 27 games – all starts – including both on 29 March 2014 in a 2–1 win over Bristol City. He won promotion to the Championship with Rotherham, beating Leyton Orient on penalties in the play-off final at Wembley Stadium on 25 May.

=== Wigan Athletic ===
Tavernier signed for Wigan Athletic for an undisclosed fee on 28 June 2014. He made his Championship debut on 9 August, replacing Don Cowie for the final 18 minutes of a 2–2 draw with Reading at the DW Stadium in the first game of the season.

Tavernier signed for League One club Bristol City on 15 January 2015, on loan for the remainder of the season. He scored three times in 12 games for the champion Robins, including two on 14 April in a 6–0 win at his hometown team Bradford City. He also helped them win the 2014–15 Football League Trophy, for the final of which he was on the bench.

=== Rangers ===
==== 2015–2018: Arrival and promotion ====
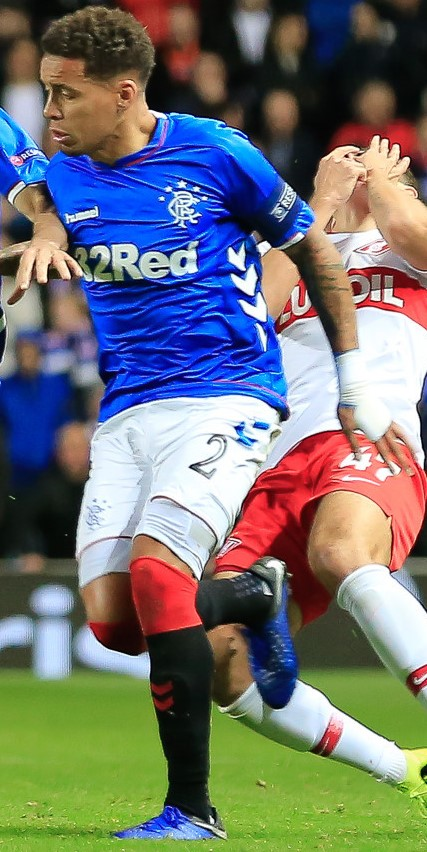
Tavernier playing for Rangers in 2018

On 20 July 2015, Tavernier and Wigan teammate Martyn Waghorn both signed three-year contracts with the then Scottish Championship club Rangers for a transfer fee of £200,000. He scored on his debut five days later from a free kick in a 6–2 win at Hibernian in the first round of the Scottish Challenge Cup, and added another eight days later in a 3–0 win over Peterhead in the same round of the Scottish League Cup at Ibrox Stadium.

He scored his first league goal for Rangers in a 5–1 win over Alloa Athletic on 16 August. Tavernier scored again for Rangers from an edge-of-the-box free kick against Hibernian a week later, putting Rangers on top of the Championship; he was awarded the division's Player of the Month for August and his manager Mark Warburton also received the Manager of the Month award.

In October, having scored nine goals by that stage in the season, Tavernier admitted that he and Waghorn had been short of confidence before moving to Rangers, due to the inconsistency and squad rotation at Wigan. On 5 April 2016, he scored the only goal of the home win over Dumbarton that gave the team the title and promotion to the top flight. Five days later in the Challenge Cup Final at Hampden Park, he netted a long-range volley in the first half of a 4–0 victory against Peterhead, and was named man of the match. On 17 April, in a Scottish Cup semi-final against Old Firm rivals Celtic, he missed in the penalty shootout after a 2–2 draw, but Rangers nonetheless won 5–4 before finishing runners-up to Hibernian in the final after a 3-2 loss.

After a strong first season, Rangers offered Tavernier a new contract which he rejected, with media reports citing the financial rewards were not good enough. On 19 July, Tavernier agreed a new contract extension with Rangers and signed a deal until May 2019 two days later.

==== 2018–2021: Captaincy and Premiership title ====
In July 2018, ahead of the 2018–19 season, Tavernier was appointed new club captain by new manager Steven Gerrard. In their first match as manager and captain, he scored in a 2–0 win against FK Shkupi in the Europa League at Ibrox on 12 July.

In March 2019, Tavernier was confronted by a Hibernian supporter during a Scottish Premiership match at Easter Road. Cameron Mack, a 21-year-old man from Port Seton in East Lothian, jumped over the advertising boards and approached Tavernier before being led away by police and stewards and arrested. Mack was later banned from attending any football ground in Scotland after pleading guilty to breach of the peace at Edinburgh Sheriff Court. In October 2019, Tavernier was defended by Gerrard after missing his third penalty of the season.

During the 2020–21 season, Rangers had their best defensive start to a Scottish Premiership campaign, keeping seven consecutive clean sheets. As of 8 December 2020, they had conceded only three goals in the league whilst scoring 45, and also progressed from their Europa League group; Tavernier contributed heavily to both the defensive record and attacking returns, with 16 goals and 11 assists in all competitions by that point. He was the league's Player of the Month in September and November. On 6 April 2021, Tavernier signed a new three-year contract. Rangers went on to win the 2020–21 Scottish Premiership, which was their first Scottish league title since 2011. Tavernier won the PFA Scotland Players' Player of the Year.

==== 2021–2026: European final and domestic cup wins ====
He made his 300th Rangers appearance on 25 September in a 1–0 win at Dundee, having 66 goals by that point. In February 2022, he scored a penalty to open a 4–2 win at Borussia Dortmund in the last 32 of the Europa League, and scored both Rangers goals in a draw in the second leg to advance. He netted another brace on 14 April, as the team won 3–1 at home to Braga after extra time to make the semi-finals, where he scored against RB Leipzig. He was the top scorer with seven goals as the team finished runners-up to Eintracht Frankfurt and netted Rangers' first attempt in the penalty shootout loss in the final. He was the first defender to be top scorer in a European season since Ronald Koeman for FC Barcelona in the 1993–94 UEFA Champions League. Days later, Tavernier won his first Scottish Cup final title (and Rangers' first since 2009) in a 2–0 win against Heart of Midlothian, having earlier beaten Celtic in the semi-finals.

On 17 December 2023, Tavernier scored in the only goal in the Scottish League Cup final as Rangers defeated Aberdeen at Hampden; it was his 14th goal in the fixture (all others coming in the Scottish Premiership), tying him with Ally McCoist and Derek Johnstone as the all-time top scorer.

On 30 March 2024, Tavernier scored against Hibernian in a league tie at home at Ibrox to become the "highest-scoring defender in British football history". His 131st senior goal surpassed the previous record held by Graham Alexander. Almost a year later, on 1 March 2025, Tavernier became only the fourteenth player in the clubs history to make 500 appearances in all competitions. Tavernier started and captained the team during a 2–1 defeat in a Scottish Premiership match against Motherwell.

On 8 March 2026, in a Scottish Cup quarter-final, and would become his final cup match for Rangers before announcing his departure, Tavernier missed the opening penalty in the shootout following a 0–0 draw against Celtic. Rangers went on to lose the shootout 2–4. A month later, on 22 April, he announced he would leave the club at the end of the season.

=== Maccabi Tel Aviv ===
On 7 September 2026, Tavernier joined Israeli Premier League side Maccabi Tel Aviv on a one-year deal.

== Personal life ==
Tavernier was born in Bradford. His younger brother, Marcus, is also a footballer and plays for English Premier League side Bournemouth.

== Career statistics ==
As of match played 10 May 2026

Appearances and goals by club, season and competition
Club	Season	League			National cup (Note: Includes FA Cup, Scottish Cup)		League cup (Note: Includes Football League Cup, Scottish League Cup)		Europe		Other		Total	
Club	Season	Division	Apps	Goals	Apps	Goals	Apps	Goals	Apps	Goals	Apps	Goals	Apps	Goals
Newcastle United	2009–10	Championship	0	0	0	0	1	0	—		—		1	0
Newcastle United	2010–11	Premier League	0	0	—		1	0	—		—		1	0
Newcastle United	2012–13	Premier League	2	0	1	0	1	0	4 (Note: Appearances in UEFA Europa League)	0	—		8	0
Newcastle United	Total		2	0	1	0	3	0	4	0	—		10	0
Gateshead (loan)	2010–11	Conference Premier	13	0	0	0	—		—		5 (Note: Appearances in FA Trophy)	0	18	0
Carlisle United (loan)	2011–12	League One	16	0	0	0	0	0	—		1 (Note: Appearances in Football League Trophy)	0	17	0
Sheffield Wednesday (loan)	2011–12	League One	6	0	2	0	—		—		—		8	0
Milton Keynes Dons (loan)	2011–12	League One	7	0	—		—		—		—		7	0
Shrewsbury Town (loan)	2013–14	League One	1	0	—		1	0	—		—		2	0
Rotherham United (loan)	2013–14	League One	27	5	0	0	—		—		4 (Note: One appearance in Football League Trophy, three appearances in League One play-offs)	0	31	5
Wigan Athletic	2014–15	Championship	11	0	1	0	1	0	—		—		13	0
Bristol City (loan)	2014–15	League One	12	3	—		—		—		1	0	13	3
Rangers	2015–16	Scottish Championship	36	10	6	0	3	3	—		5 (Note: Appearances in Scottish Challenge Cup)	2	50	15
Rangers	2016–17	Scottish Premiership	36	1	3	0	5	1	—		—		44	2
Rangers	2017–18	Scottish Premiership	38	8	3	0	3	1	2	0	—		46	9
Rangers	2018–19	Scottish Premiership	37	14	4	0	2	0	14	3	—		57	17
Rangers	2019–20	Scottish Premiership	24	3	2	0	3	0	17	0	—		46	3
Rangers	2020–21	Scottish Premiership	33	12	1	1	2	1	10	5	—		46	19
Rangers	2021–22	Scottish Premiership	35	9	4	2	2	0	17 (Note: Two appearances in UEFA Champions League, fourteen appearances and seven goals in UEFA Europa League)	7	—		58	18
Rangers	2022–23	Scottish Premiership	38	16	4	0	3	0	10 (Note: Appearances in UEFA Champions League)	2	—		55	18
Rangers	2023–24	Scottish Premiership	38	17	5	1	3	3	12 (Note: Four appearances and three goals in UEFA Champions League, eight appearances in UEFA Europa League)	3	—		58	24
Rangers	2024–25	Scottish Premiership	33	4	2	0	4	1	14 (Note: Two appearances in UEFA Champions league, twelve appearances in UEFA Europa League)	0	—		53	5
Rangers	2025–26	Scottish Premiership	34	8	2	3	3	2	13 (Note: Six appearances in UEFA Champions league, seven appearances and one goal in UEFA Europa League)	1	—		52	14
Rangers	Total		382	102	36	7	33	12	109	21	5	2	565	144
Career total			477	110	44	7	38	12	113	21	16	2	688	152

== Honours ==
Rotherham United

- Football League One play-offs: 2014

Bristol City

- Football League One: 2014–15
- Football League Trophy: 2014–15

Rangers

- Scottish Premiership: 2020–21
- Scottish Cup: 2021–22; runner up: 2015–16, 2023–24
- Scottish League Cup: 2023–24 runner up: 2019–20, 2022–23, 2024–25
- Scottish Championship: 2015–16
- Scottish Challenge Cup: 2015–16
- UEFA Europa League runner-up: 2021–22

Individual

- PFA Scotland Players' Player of the Year: 2020–21
- PFA Scotland Team of the Year: 2015–16 Scottish Championship
- Scottish Championship Player of the Month: August 2015
- Scottish Premiership Player of the Month: September 2020, November 2020
- Scottish Professional Football League Goal of the Season: 2015–16
- PFA Scotland Team of the Year: 2017–18 Premiership, 2018–19 Premiership, 2020–21 Scottish Premiership, 2021–22 Premiership, 2022–23 Premiership
- UEFA Europa League top scorer: 2021–22 (7 goals)
- UEFA Europa League Team of the Season: 2021–22
- Rangers Hall of Fame: 2023
