= 1977–78 Scottish Cup =

Tournament details
- Country: Scotland

Final positions
- Champions: Rangers
- Runners-up: Aberdeen

The 1977–78 Scottish Cup was the 93rd staging of Scotland's most prestigious football knockout competition. The Cup was won by Rangers who defeated Aberdeen in the final.

== First round ==
Home team	Score	Away team
Brechin City	2 – 0	Falkirk
Burntisland Shipyard	1 – 4	Berwick Rangers
Civil Service Strollers	4 – 3	Selkirk
Dunfermline Athletic	0 – 0	Clyde
Inverness Caledonian	5 – 0	Inverness Thistle
Raith Rovers	1 – 0	Stenhousemuir

=== Replays ===
Home team	Score	Away team
Clyde	0 – 3	Dunfermline Athletic

== Second round ==
Home team	Score	Away team
Albion Rovers	1 – 0	Buckie Thistle
Berwick Rangers	6 – 0	Raith Rovers
Brechin City	1 – 0	Dunfermline Athletic
Inverness Caledonian	4 – 0	Civil Service Strollers
Meadowbank Thistle	2 – 1	East Stirlingshire
Peterhead	1 – 1	Cowdenbeath
Stranraer	0 – 1	Queen's Park
Vale of Leithen	4 – 1	Forfar Athletic

=== Replays ===
Home team	Score	Away team
Cowdenbeath	5 – 0	Peterhead

== Third round ==
Home team	Score	Away team
St Johnstone	1 – 0	Brechin City
Stirling Albion	3 – 0	Clydebank
Aberdeen	2 – 0	Ayr United
Airdrieonians	2 – 3	Hearts
Celtic	7 – 1	Dundee
St Mirren	1 – 2	Kilmarnock
Albion Rovers	0 – 1	Greenock Morton
Partick Thistle	1 – 1	Cowdenbeath
Vale of Leithen	0 – 1	Queen's Park
Alloa Athletic	2 – 2	Dumbarton
Arbroath	0 – 4	Motherwell
Berwick Rangers	2 – 4	Rangers
Hamilton Academical	1 – 4	Dundee United
Hibernian	4 – 0	East Fife
Meadowbank Thistle	2 – 1	Inverness Caledonian
Queen of the South	2 – 2	Montrose

=== Replays ===
Home team	Score	Away team
Cowdenbeath	0 – 1	Partick Thistle
Dumbarton	2 – 1	Alloa Athletic
Montrose	1 – 3	Queen of the South

== Fourth round ==
Home team	Score	Away team
Hibernian	0 – 0	Partick Thistle
Aberdeen	3 – 0	St Johnstone
Celtic	1 – 1	Kilmarnock
Dundee United	3 – 0	Queen of the South
Motherwell	1 – 3	Queen's Park
Dumbarton	1 – 1	Hearts
Greenock Morton	3 – 0	Meadowbank Thistle
Rangers	1 – 0	Stirling Albion

=== Replays ===
Home team	Score	Away team
Partick Thistle	2 – 1	Hibernian
Kilmarnock	1 – 0	Celtic
Hearts	0 – 1	Dumbarton

== Quarter-finals ==
Home team	Score	Away team
Aberdeen	2 – 2	Greenock Morton
Dundee United	2 – 0	Queen's Park
Partick Thistle	2 – 1	Dumbarton
Rangers	4 – 1	Kilmarnock

=== Replays ===
Home team	Score	Away team
Greenock Morton	1 – 2	Aberdeen

== Semi-finals ==
5 April 1978

Rangers	2–0	Dundee United

Hampden Park, Glasgow
Attendance: 25,619

12 April 1978

Aberdeen	4–2	Partick Thistle
Fleming 32' 39' 77'; Joe Harper 71' (pen.)		Melrose 64' 68'

Hampden Park, Glasgow
Attendance: 12,282
Referee: John Gordon

== Final ==
6 May 1978

Rangers	2–1	Aberdeen
Alex MacDonald 35'; Derek Johnstone 57'		Ritchie 85'

Hampden Park, Glasgow
Attendance: 61,563
Referee: Brian McGinlay

== See also ==
- 1977–78 in Scottish football
- 1977–78 Scottish League Cup
