= 1987 Scottish League Cup final =

- Event: 1987–88 Scottish League Cup
Aberdeen	Rangers
3	3
- Date: 25 October 1987
- Venue: Hampden Park, Glasgow
- Referee: Bob Valentine
- Attendance: 71,961

The 1987 Scottish League Cup final was played on 25 October 1987 at Hampden Park in Glasgow and was the final of the 42nd Scottish League Cup competition. The final was contested by Aberdeen and Rangers. Rangers defeated Aberdeen 5–3 on penalties after the sides drew 3–3.

== Match details ==
25 October 1987
15:00

Aberdeen	3–3 (a.e.t.)	Rangers
Bett 9' (pen.); Hewitt 72'; Falconer 80'	Report	Cooper 22'; Durrant 40'; Fleck 87'
Penalties
Bett (penalty scored); Nicholas (penalty missed); Peter Weir (penalty scored); Hewitt (penalty scored)	3–5 Rangers went first	(penalty scored) McCoist; (penalty scored) Cooper; (penalty scored) Fleck; (penalty scored) Francis; (penalty scored) Durrant

Hampden Park, Glasgow
Attendance: 71,961
Referee: Bob Valentine

ABERDEEN :
GK	1	(Scotland) Jim Leighton
RB	2	(Scotland) Stewart McKimmie
CB	5	(Scotland) Alex McLeish
CB	6	(Scotland) Willie Miller (c)
LB	11	(Scotland) Willie Falconer
RM	8	(Scotland) Jim Bett
CM	4	(Scotland) Neil Simpson	Substituted off
CM	3	(Scotland) Bobby Connor
LM	10	(Wales) Peter Nicholas
CF	9	(Scotland) Joe Miller
CF	7	(Scotland) John Hewitt
Substitutes:
MF	12	(Scotland) Peter Weir	Substituted on
MF	14	(Scotland) Brian Grant
Manager:
(Scotland) Ian Porterfield

RANGERS :
GK	1	(Scotland) Nicky Walker
RB	2	(Northern Ireland) Jimmy Nicholl
CB	6	(Scotland) Richard Gough
CB	4	(England) Graham Roberts (c)
LB	3	(Scotland) Stuart Munro
RM	7	(Scotland) John McGregor	(substituted off) 1'
CM	5	(Scotland) Derek Ferguson	(substituted off) 2'
CM	10	(Scotland) Ian Durrant
LM	11	(Scotland) Davie Cooper
CF	9	(Scotland) Ally McCoist
CF	8	(Scotland) Robert Fleck
Substitutes:
FW	12	(England) Trevor Francis	(substituted on) 2'
DF	14	(Israel) Avi Cohen	(substituted on) 1'
Manager:
(Scotland) Graeme Souness

== See also ==
- Aberdeen F.C.–Rangers F.C. rivalry
