= Petroleum industry in Aberdeen =

The petroleum industry in Aberdeen, the third most populous city in Scotland, began in the mid-20th century following the discovery of significant oil deposits in the North Sea. Aberdeen has been characterised as the "oil capital" of Scotland, the United Kingdom, as well as Europe as a whole.

Aberdeen boasts the primary main heliport for the offshore North Sea oil and gas industry at Aberdeen Airport. Aberdeen Harbour is an important port for offshore oil rigs. The number of jobs created by the energy industry in and around Aberdeen has been estimated at half a million. Owing to the natural decline in North Sea oil reserves, the local and national government have worked to promote the growth of the renewable energy in Aberdeen, including the wind energy sector.

== History ==
=== 20th century ===
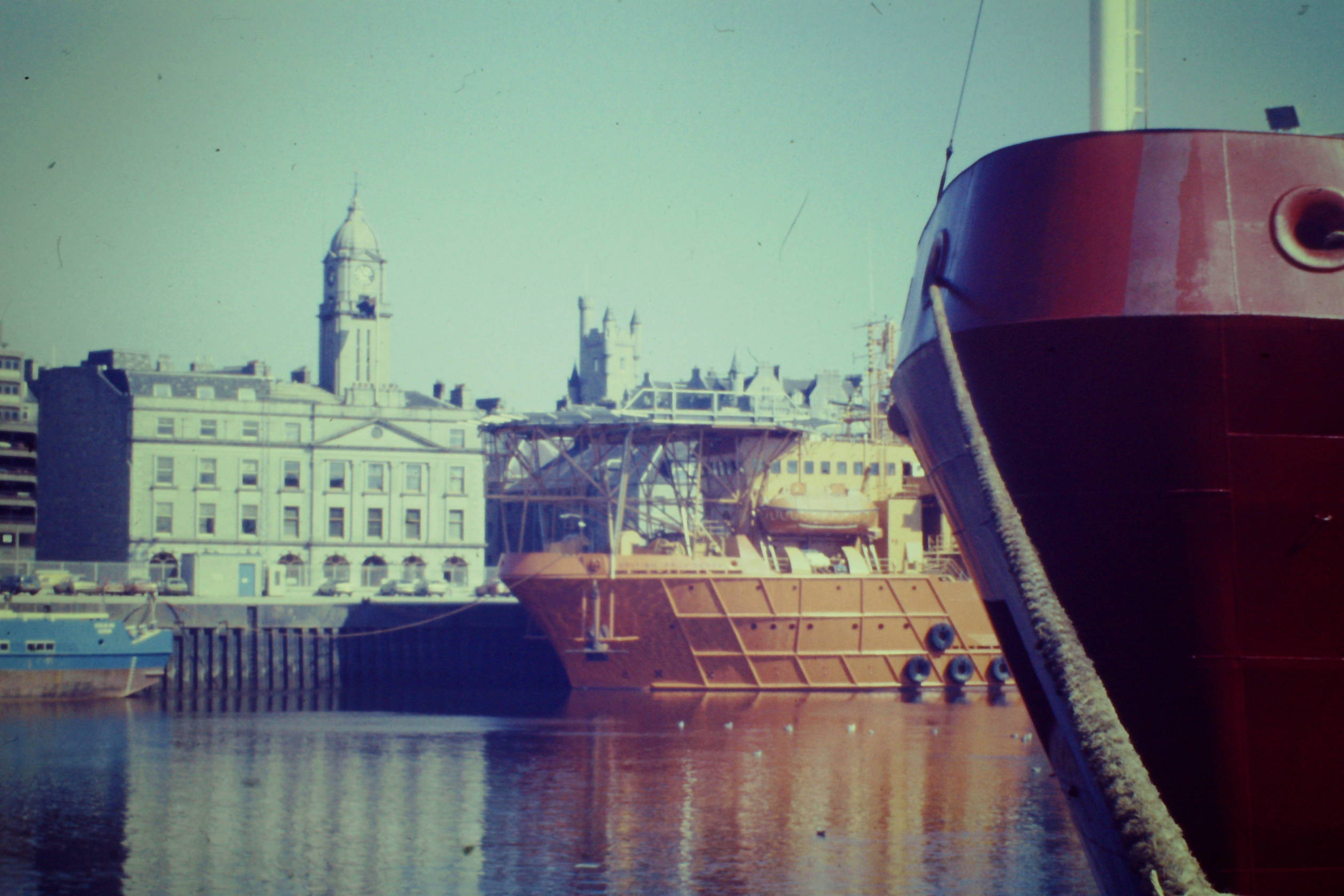
1986 photo of oil boats in Aberdeen

Beginning in the 1970s, Aberdeen began its transition from a city dominated by the fishing industry to one dominated by the petroleum industry. According to The New York Times, the Aberdeen oil industry's success can be partially credited to its role in developing undersea technology for offshore drilling.

The most severe disaster to occur in the region took place in 1988, when the city was dealt a heavy blow by the loss of 167 men during an explosion and fire aboard an offshore rig, the Piper Alpha. It remains the world's worst offshore disaster and there is a memorial to the crew in Hazlehead Park.

=== 21st century ===
While reserves continue to flow fast, it has been estimated that the North Sea is nearing or has even surpassed its peak production rate. As a result, Aberdeen is expected to have to redevelop itself as a research and development hub, rather than a base for offshore drilling, in order to remain home to the multi-national companies that drive its economy. In 2006, the large training centre began operating in Aberdeen, training specialists in the oil and gas sector.

As of 2013, despite declining North Sea reserves, Aberdeen remained a major world center for undersea petroleum technology. In 2014, the global plunge in oil prices caused economic distress in Aberdeen. Russell Borthwick, a local chamber of commerce executive, argued the oil plunge was a turning point for the local industry, stating it was a "wake-up call that Aberdeen actually needed to say, 'This ain't going to be around forever'".

According to the Financial Times in 2023, workers in Aberdeen's oil industry are on average paid £88,000, a salary higher than the Scottish average of £29,000.

== Future of the industry ==
In 2021, Scottish businessman Ian Wood noted that crude oil production in Aberdeen now totals at just over a third of its peak of 4.5 million barrels a day (B/D). This number is projected to decrease to 400,000 B/D by the year 2050. To emphasize the growth of the city's renewable energy sector, there have been local political attempts to transform Aberdeen's reputation from the "Oil Capital of Europe" into the "Energy Capital of Europe".

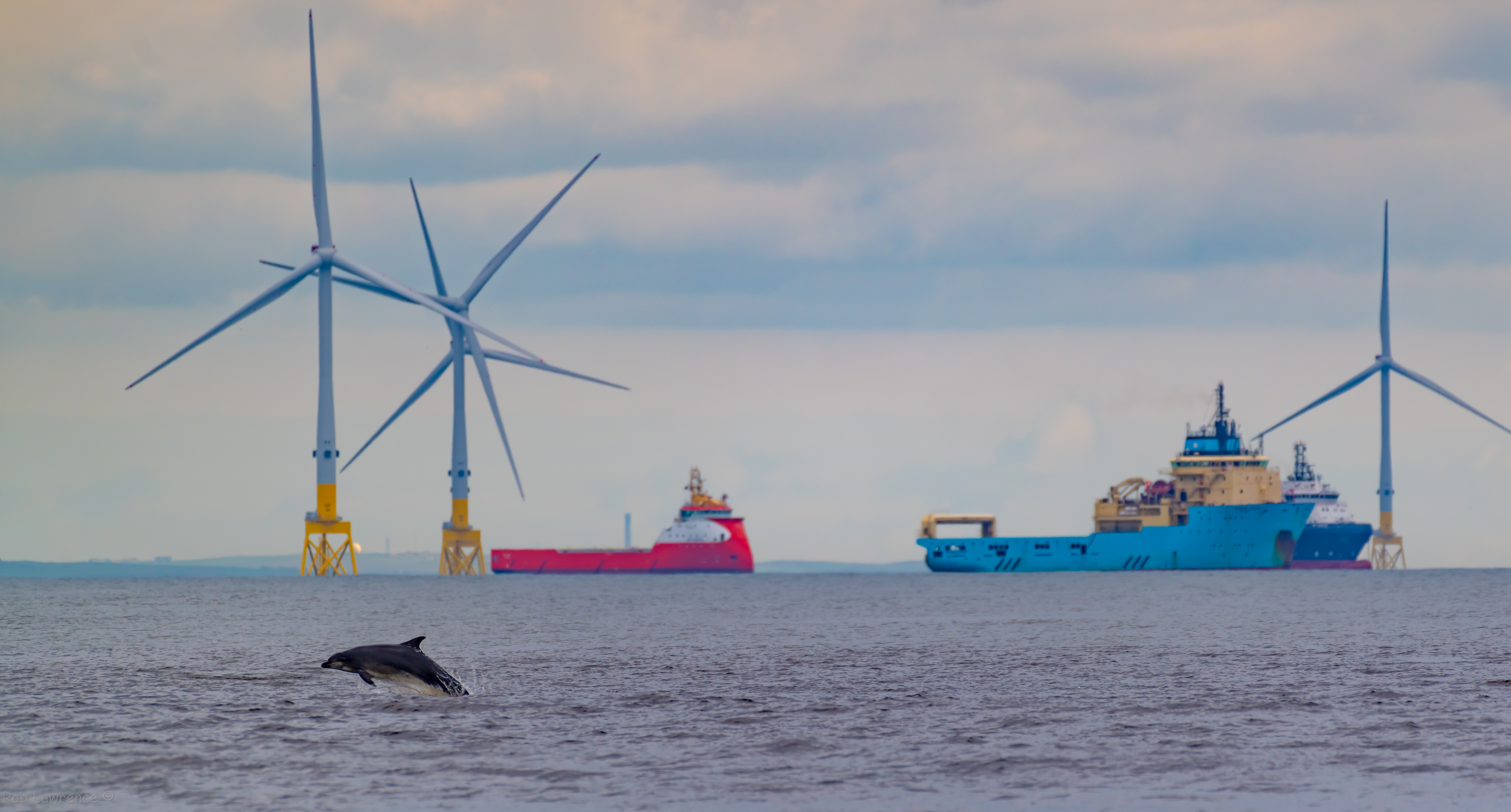
Photo from 2019 of oil and gas ships
