= 1978–79 Scottish League Cup =

Tournament details
- Country: Scotland

Final positions
- Champions: Rangers
- Runners-up: Aberdeen

The 1978–79 Scottish League Cup was the thirty-third season of Scotland's second football knockout competition. The competition was won by Rangers, who defeated Aberdeen in the Final.

== First round ==
=== First leg ===
Home team	Score	Away team	Date
Alloa Athletic	4–1	Stirling Albion	16 August 1978
Berwick Rangers	2–0	St Johnstone	16 August 1978
Celtic	3–1	Dundee	16 August 1978
Dumbarton	0–0	St Mirren	16 August 1978
Montrose	4–0	Queen of the South	16 August 1978
Rangers	3–0	Albion Rovers	16 August 1978

=== Second leg ===
Home team	Score	Away team	Date	Agg
Albion Rovers	0–1	Rangers	23 August 1978	0–4
Dundee	0–3	Celtic	23 August 1978	1–6
Queen of the South	0–1	Montrose	23 August 1978	0–5
St Johnstone	0–0	Berwick Rangers	23 August 1978	0–2
St Mirren	2–0	Dumbarton	23 August 1978	2–0
Stirling Albion	0–1	Alloa Athletic	23 August 1978	1–5

== Second round ==
=== First leg ===
Home team	Score	Away team	Date
Airdrieonians	3–0	Dunfermline Ath	30 August 1978
Ayr United	1–0	Stranraer	30 August 1978
Berwick Rangers	1–3	St Mirren	30 August 1978
Brechin City	0–3	Hibernian	30 August 1978
Clyde	3–1	Motherwell	30 August 1978
Cowdenbeath	3–2	Hamilton Academical	30 August 1978
Dundee United	2–3	Celtic	30 August 1978
East Fife	0–1	Arbroath	30 August 1978
Heart of Midlothian	1–3	Morton	30 August 1978
Kilmarnock	2–0	Alloa Athletic	30 August 1978
Meadowbank Thistle	0–5	Aberdeen	30 August 1978
Montrose	1–1	East Stirlingshire	28 August 1978
Partick Thistle	1–1	Falkirk	30 August 1978
Raith Rovers	4–2	Queen's Park	30 August 1978
Rangers	3–0	Forfar Athletic	30 August 1978
Stenhousemuir	1–0	Clydebank	30 August 1978

=== Second leg ===
Home team	Score	Away team	Date	Agg
Aberdeen	4–0	Meadowbank Thistle	2 September 1978	9–0
Alloa Athletic	1–1	Kilmarnock	2 September 1978	1–3
Arbroath	1–0	East Fife	2 September 1978	2–0
Celtic	1–0	Dundee United	2 September 1978	4–2
Clydebank	4–1	Stenhousemuir	2 September 1978	4–2
Dunfermline Ath	0–5	Airdrieonians	2 September 1978	0–8
East Stirlingshire	0–2	Montrose	2 September 1978	1–3
Falkirk	2–2	Partick Thistle	2 September 1978	3–3
Forfar Athletic	1–4	Rangers	2 September 1978	1–7
Morton	4–1	Heart of Midlothian	2 September 1978	7–2
Hamilton Academical	2–0	Cowdenbeath	2 September 1978	4–3
Hibernian	3–1	Brechin City	2 September 1978	6–1
Motherwell	3–0	Clyde	2 September 1978	4–3
Queen's Park	4–2	Raith Rovers	2 September 1978	6–6
St Mirren	5–1	Berwick Rangers	2 September 1978	8–2
Stranraer	1–3	Ayr United	2 September 1978	1–4

== Third round ==
=== First leg ===
Home team	Score	Away team	Date
Arbroath	1–1	Airdrieonians	4 October 1978
Celtic	0–1	Motherwell	4 October 1978
Falkirk	0–2	Ayr United	4 October 1978
Hamilton Academical	0–1	Aberdeen	4 October 1978
Hibernian	1–0	Clydebank	4 October 1978
Kilmarnock	2–0	Morton	4 October 1978
Raith Rovers	3–0	Montrose	4 October 1978
Rangers	3–2	St Mirren	4 October 1978

=== Second leg ===
Home team	Score	Away team	Date	Agg
Aberdeen	7–1	Hamilton Academical	11 October 1978	8–1
Airdrieonians	1–2	Arbroath	10 October 1978	2–3
Ayr United	1–1	Falkirk	11 October 1978	3–1
Clydebank	1–1	Hibernian	11 October 1978	1–2
Morton	5–2	Kilmarnock	11 October 1978	5–4
Montrose	5–1	Raith Rovers	11 October 1978	5–4
Motherwell	1–4	Celtic	11 October 1978	2–4
St Mirren	0–0	Rangers	11 October 1978	2–3

== Quarter-finals ==
=== First leg ===
Home team	Score	Away team	Date
Ayr United	3–3	Aberdeen	8 November 1978
Montrose	1–1	Celtic	8 November 1978
Morton	1–0	Hibernian	8 November 1978
Rangers	1–0	Arbroath	8 November 1978

=== Second leg ===
Home team	Score	Away team	Date	Agg
Aberdeen	3–1	Ayr United	15 November 1978	6–4
Arbroath	1–2	Rangers	15 November 1978	1–3
Celtic	3–1	Montrose	15 November 1978	4–2
Hibernian	2–0	Morton	15 November 1978	2–1

== Semi-finals ==
Home team	Score	Away team	Date
Aberdeen	1–0	Hibernian	13 December 1978
Rangers	3–2	Celtic	13 December 1978

== Final ==
31 March 1979

Rangers	2–1	Aberdeen
Jackson; MacDonald		Davidson

Hampden Park, Glasgow
Attendance: 54,000
