= Colin Jackson (Scottish footballer) =

Scottish footballer

Personal information
- Full name: Colin MacDonald Jackson
- Date of birth: 8 October 1946
- Place of birth: London, England
- Date of death: 6 June 2015 (aged 68)
- Place of death: Glasgow, Scotland
- Position: Defender

Youth career
- Banks O' Dee

Senior career*
Years	Team	Apps	(Gls)
1963–1982	Rangers	341	(23)
1982	Morton	6	(0)
1982–1983	Partick Thistle	19	(0)
1983	Morton	2	(0)
Total		368	(23)

International career
1975–1976	Scotland	8	(1)
1976	Scottish League XI	1	(0)
- * Club domestic league appearances and goals

Colin MacDonald Jackson (8 October 1946 – 6 June 2015) was a Scottish footballer, who played predominantly for Rangers and the Scotland national team.

== Career ==
Jackson, a defender, initially joined Rangers straight from Ruthrieston School in 1962. He had a spell with Aberdeen side Sunnybank Athletic before rejoining the Light Blues in 1963. He made a total of 506 appearances for Rangers between 1963 and 1982 and during his time at Ibrox won 3 League championships, 3 Scottish Cups and 5 League Cups. In the 1978–79 Scottish League Cup Final, he scored a last-minute winning goal. Perhaps the biggest disappointment during his career came when he missed out on Rangers' victory in the 1972 European Cup Winners' Cup Final, having failed a fitness test prior to the game against Moscow Dynamo.

Jackson was also recognised internationally by the Scottish League XI, Scotland under-23 and Scotland. He won a total of eight full international caps between 1975 and 1976, scoring one goal. In his eight full internationals he was unbeaten, with Scotland recording five wins and three draws.

After leaving Rangers, Jackson spent a month with Morton then the rest of the 1982–83 season with Partick Thistle. He retired in the summer of 1983 and became a partner in an East Kilbride printing venture. He lived in Rutherglen for over 30 years.

He died of leukaemia at his home on 6 June 2015.

== See also ==
- List of Scotland international footballers born outside Scotland
