= 1992–93 Queens Park Rangers F.C. season =

English football club season

Queens Park Rangers
1992–93 season
- Chairman: Richard Thompson
- Manager: Gerry Francis
- Stadium: Loftus Road
- FA Premier League: 5th
- FA Cup: Fourth round
- League Cup: Fourth round
- Top goalscorer: League: Les Ferdinand (20); All: Les Ferdinand (24)
- Highest home attendance: 21,056 Vs Liverpool (23 November 1992)
- Lowest home attendance: 7,275 Vs Grimsby Town (21 September 1992)
- Average home league attendance: 15,015
- Biggest win: 4-1 Vs Tottenham Hotspur (3 October 1992)
- Biggest defeat: 0-4 Vs Sheffield Wednesday (2 December 1992)
Home colours	Away colours

In the 1992–93 season, Queens Park Rangers F.C. competed in the inaugural season of the English FA Premier League. They finished the season in 5th place.

== Season summary ==
QPR enjoyed a strong season in the inaugural season of the Premier League, Even leading after 4 games into the season, ultimately finishing in fifth place - not high enough for UEFA Cup qualification, but still higher than other more fancied sides like Liverpool and Arsenal. Moreover, their high placing ensured that Rangers finished as the top team in London. the Manchester City away game on 17 August was the first match ever to be broadcast live via satellite by BSkyB.

== Kit ==
Clubhouse was QPR's kit manufacturer. Radio Station Classic FM (UK) became new kit sponsors.

== Final league table ==
Pos	Team	Pld	W	D	L	GF	GA	GD	Pts	Qualification or relegation
3	Norwich City	42	21	9	12	61	65	−4	72	Qualification for the UEFA Cup first round (Note: Since League Cup winners Arsenal had qualified for the UEFA Cup Winners Cup by also winning the FA Cup, the UEFA Cup berth for the League Cup reverted to the league and was awarded to Norwich City. England was considered for an extra slot for the UEFA Cup after the 1993 Polish football scandal, but another one was given to Scotland, and it was thought excessive to give both two slots to Great Britain, and the extra place was awarded to Hungary.)
4	Blackburn Rovers	42	20	11	11	68	46	+22	71	
5	Queens Park Rangers	42	17	12	13	63	55	+8	63	
6	Liverpool	42	16	11	15	62	55	+7	59	
7	Sheffield Wednesday	42	15	14	13	55	51	+4	59	

Source: Premier League
Rules for classification: 1) points; 2) goal difference; 3) number of goals scored.

== Results ==
Queens Park Rangers' score comes first

=== Legend ===
Win	Draw	Loss

=== FA Premier League ===
Date	Opponents	Venue	Result F–A	Scorers	Attendance	Position
17 August 1992	Manchester City	A	1–1	Sinton 47'	24,471	17
19 August 1992	Southampton	H	3–1	Ferdinand (2), Bardsley	10,925	4
22 August 1992	Sheffield United	H	3–2	Ferdinand, Barker, Bailey	10,932	3
26 August 1992	Coventry City	A	1–0	Impey	13,563	1
29 August 1992	Chelsea	A	0–1		22,910	3
2 September 1992	Arsenal	H	0–0		20,861	4
5 September 1992	Ipswich Town	H	0–0		12,806	5
12 September 1992	Southampton	A	2–1	Sinton, Channing	14,125	4
19 September 1992	Middlesbrough	H	3–3	Ferdinand, Penrice, Sinton (pen)	12,272	5
26 September 1992	Manchester United	A	0–0		33,287	5
3 October 1992	Tottenham Hotspur	H	4–1	Holloway, Wilkins, Penrice (2)	19,845	4
17 October 1992	Norwich City	A	1–2	Allen	16,009	5
24 October 1992	Leeds United	H	2–1	Bardsley, Ferdinand	19,326	3
1 November 1992	Aston Villa	A	0–2		20,140	5
7 November 1992	Wimbledon	A	2–0	Allen, Wilkins	6,771	5
23 November 1992	Liverpool	H	0–1		21,056	5
28 November 1992	Blackburn Rovers	A	0–1		15,850	7
5 December 1992	Oldham Athletic	H	3–2	Ferdinand (2), Penrice	11,804	6
12 December 1992	Crystal Palace	H	1–3	Penrice	14,571	7
19 December 1992	Sheffield Wednesday	A	0–1		23,164	9
26 December 1992	Nottingham Forest	A	PP			
28 December 1992	Everton	H	4–2	Sinton (3), Penrice	14,802	7
9 January 1993	Middlesbrough	A	1–0	Ferdinand	15,616	6
18 January 1993	Manchester United	H	1–3	Allen 43'	20,142	6
27 January 1993	Chelsea	H	1–1	Allen 88'	15,806	8
30 January 1993	Sheffield United	A	2–1	Allen, Holloway	16,366	7
6 February 1993	Manchester City	H	1–1	Wilson (66' pen)	13,003	8
9 February 1993	Ipswich Town	A	1–1	White 78'	17,426	7
13 February 1993	Arsenal	A	PP			
20 February 1993	Coventry City	H	2–0	Pearce (own goal), Peacock	12,453	5
24 February 1993	Nottingham Forest	A	0–1		22,436	6
27 February 1993	Tottenham Hotspur	A	2–3	Peacock, White	32,341	6
6 March 1993	Norwich City	H	3–1	Ferdinand (2), Wilson	13,892	4
10 March 1993	Liverpool	A	0–1		30,370	5
13 March 1993	Wimbledon	H	1–2	Ferdinand	12,270	5
20 March 1993	Oldham Athletic	A	2–2	Allen, Sinton	10,946	5
24 March 1993	Blackburn Rovers	H	0–3		10,677	7
3 April 1993	Crystal Palace	A	1–1	Allen	14,705	8
10 April 1993	Nottingham Forest	H	4–3	Ferdinand (3), Wilson (pen)	16,782	5
12 April 1993	Everton	A	5–3	Impey 5', Ferdinand 39', 46', 51', Bardsley 79'	19,026	5
17 April 1993	Sheffield Wednesday	H	PP			
1 May 1993	Leeds United	A	1–1	Ferdinand	31,408	6
4 May 1993	Arsenal	A	0–0		18,817	5
9 May 1993	Aston Villa	H	2–1	Ferdinand67', Allen 78'	18,904	5
11 May 1993	Sheffield Wednesday	H	3–1	Allen (2), Ferdinand	12,177	5

=== FA Cup ===
Round	Date	Opponent	Venue	Result F–A	Scorers	Attendance
R3	4 January 1993	Swindon Town (First Division)	H	3–0	Ferdinand 22', 24', Penrice 27'	12,106
R4	23 January 1993	Manchester City (FA Premiership)	H	1–2	Holloway 90'	18,652

=== Football League Cup ===
Round	Date	Opponent	Venue	Result F–A	Scorers	Attendance
R2 First Leg	21 September 1992	Grimsby Town (First Division)	H	2–1	Ferdinand (2)	7,275
R2 Second Leg	6 October 1992	Grimsby Town (First Division)	A	1–2 (won 6–5 on pens)	Bailey 66'	8,443
R3	27 October 1992	Bury (Third Division)	A	2–0	Peacock, Allen	4,680
R4	2 December 1992	Sheffield Wednesday (FA Premiership)	A	0–4		17,161

=== Friendlies ===
Date	Country	Opponents	Venue	Result F–A	Scorers	Attendance
21 July 1992	Norway	Sarpsborg FK	A			
23 July 1992	Norway	Pressens Lag	A			
24 July 1992	Norway	SKI	A			
26 July 1992	Norway	Baerum Sportsklubb	A			
28 July 1992	Norway	Kongsvinger IL	A			
29 July 1992	Norway	Raufoss	A			
1 August 1992		Brentford	A			
8 August 1992		Fulham	A			
10 August 1992		Luton Town	A			
22 December 1992		Walton & Hersham	A			

== Squad ==
Position	Nationality	Name	League Appearances	League Goals	Cup Appearances	Coca-Cola Cup Goals	F.A.Cup Goals	Total Appearances	Total Goals
GK	CZE (Note: Until 31 December 1992, Stejskal's nationality was Czechoslovakia.)	Jan Stejskal	15		3			18	
GK	WAL	Tony Roberts	27		3			30	
DF	ENG	Justin Channing	2	1	1			3	1
DF	WAL	Karl Ready	3					3	
DF	NIR	Alan McDonald	38		5			43	2
DF	ENG	Rufus Brevett	13		1			14	
DF	ENG	Clive Wilson	41	3	5			46	3
DF	ENG	David Bardsley	40	3	5			45	3
DF	JAM	Danny Maddix	8		1			14	
DF	ENG	Darren Peacock	36	2	6	1		44	3
MF	ENG	Ray Wilkins	29	2	6			35	2
MF	ENG	Andy Impey	35	2	6			44	2
MF	ENG	Simon Barker	23	1	3			26	1
MF	ENG	Maurice Doyle	4					4	
MF	ENG	Ian Holloway	23	2	6		1	30	3
FW	ENG	Les Ferdinand	37	20	5	2	2	42	24
FW	ENG	Garry Thompson						6	
FW	ENG	Dennis Bailey	13	1	2	1		18	2
FW	ENG	Andy Sinton	38	7	6			44	6
FW	ENG	Devon White	3	2				4	2
FW	WAL	Michael Meaker	3					3	
FW	ENG	Bradley Allen	18	10	2	1		25	11
FW	ENG	Gary Penrice	13	6	3		1	22	7

== Transfers Out ==
Name	from	Date	Fee	Date	Club	Fee
Andy Tillson	Grimsby Town	20 Dec 1990	£400,000	September 1992	Bristol Rovers	£370,000
Robbie Herrera	Queens Park Rangers Juniors	March 1988		October 1992	Torquay United	
Gary Waddock	Millwall	9 Aug 1991	£50,000	Nov 1992	Bristol R	£100,000
Justin Channing	Queens Park Rangers Juniors	20 Aug 1986		Jan 1993	Bristol Rovers	£275,000
David McEnroe	Queens Park Rangers Juniors	Aug1990		June 1993	St.Patrick's Athletic	Free

== Transfers In ==
Name	from	Date	Fee
Marvin Bryan	Queens Park Rangers Juniors	15 Aug 1992	
Brian Croft	Chester City	20 Aug 1992	£60,000
Kevin Gallen	Queens Park Rangers Juniors	22 Sep 1992	
Devon White	Cambridge United	26 Jan 1993	£100,000
Danny Dichio	Queens Park Rangers Juniors	15 May 1993	
Mark Graham	Queens Park Rangers Juniors	June1993	
