= 1991–92 Queens Park Rangers F.C. season =

English football club season

Queens Park Rangers
1991–92 season
- Chairman: Richard Thompson
- Manager: Gerry Francis
- Stadium: Loftus Road
- First Division: 11th
- FA Cup: Third round
- League Cup: Third round
- Full Members Cup: Quarter finals
- Top goalscorer: League: Ferdinand (10); All: Bailey (11)
- Highest home attendance: 22,603 Vs Manchester United (28 March 1992)
- Lowest home attendance: 4,492 Vs Crystal Palace (26 November 1991)
- Average home league attendance: 13,592
- Biggest win: 5–1 Hull City (9 October 1991)
- Biggest defeat: 1–4 Vs Sheffield Wednesday (31 August 1991)
Home colours	Away colours	Third colours

During the 1991–92 English football season, Queens Park Rangers F.C. competed in the Football League First Division.

== Season summary ==
In the 1991–92 First Division campaign, QPR finished 11th in the league and ensured their place as founder members of the new Premier League, which began the following season. Their manager Gerry Francis oversaw one of QPR's most famous victories, the 4–1 win over leaders Manchester United at Old Trafford broadcast live on terrestrial television on New Year's Day 1992. The hat-trick scored by Dennis Bailey in that game was the last time the feat was achieved by an away player in league football at Old Trafford until 2021.

== Kit ==
Brooks Sports became QPR's new kit manufacturers and front of shirt kit sponsors.

== Final league table ==
Pos	Team	Pld	W	D	L	GF	GA	GD	Pts	Qualification or relegation
9	Sheffield United	42	16	9	17	65	63	+2	57	Qualification for the FA Premier League
10	Crystal Palace	42	14	15	13	53	61	−8	57	Qualification for the FA Premier League
11	Queens Park Rangers	42	12	18	12	48	47	+1	54	Qualification for the FA Premier League
12	Everton	42	13	14	15	52	51	+1	53	Qualification for the FA Premier League
13	Wimbledon	42	13	14	15	53	53	0	53	Qualification for the FA Premier League

Source: World Football
Rules for classification: 1) Points; 2) Goal difference; 3) Goals scored

== Results ==
QPR's score comes first

=== Legend ===
Win	Draw	Loss

=== Football League First Division ===
Date	Opponents	Venue	Result F–A	Scorers	Attendance	Position
17 August 1991	Arsenal	A	1–1	Bailey	38,099	12
21 August 1991	Norwich City	H	0–2		10,626	17
24 August 1991	Coventry City	H	1–1	Wegerle	9,393	17
27 August 1991	Liverpool	A	0–1		32,702	20
31 August 1991	Sheffield Wednesday	A	1–4	Bailey	25,022	21
4 September 1991	West Ham United	H	0–0		16,616	21
7 September 1991	Southampton	H	2–2	Barker, Thompson	9,237	21
14 September 1991	Tottenham Hotspur	A	0–2		30,059	22
17 September 1991	Luton Town	A	1–0	Barker	9,985	20
21 September 1991	Chelsea	H	2–2	Wilson 23', Peacock 57'	19,579	20
28 September 1991	Crystal Palace	A	2–2	Barker, Wegerle (pen)	15,372	19
5 October 1991	Nottingham Forest	H	0–2		13,508	19
19 October 1991	Wimbledon	A	1–0	Bailey 81'	4,630	19
26 October 1991	Everton	H	3–1	Bailey, Barker (2)	10,002	18
2 November 1991	Aston Villa	H	0–1		10,642	19
16 November 1991	Leeds United	A	0–2		27,087	19
23 November 1991	Oldham Athletic	H	1–3	Ferdinand	8,947	21
30 November 1991	Notts County	A	1–0	Ferdinand	7,901	19
7 December 1991	Sheffield United	H	1–0	Wegerle	10,106	17
14 December 1991	Manchester City	A	2–2	Wegerle 54 'Missed penalty 88, Bailey 89'	21,437	17
21 December 1991	Norwich City	A	1–0	Bailey	11,436	14
26 December 1991	Liverpool	H	0–0		21,693	15
28 December 1991	Sheffield Wednesday	H	1–1	Wilkins	12,990	15
1 January 1992	Manchester United	A	4–1	Sinton 3', Bailey 5', 58', 86'	38,554	13
11 January 1992	Coventry City	A	2–2	Penrice (2)	11,999	13
18 January 1992	Arsenal	H	0–0		20,497	13
1 February 1992	Wimbledon	H	1–1	Penrice	9,914	14
8 February 1992	Everton	A	0–0		18,212	13
15 February 1992	Oldham Athletic	A	1–2	Wegerle	13,092	14
22 February 1992	Notts County	H	1–1	Ferdinand	8,300	14
29 February 1992	Sheffield United	A	0–0		17,958	14
7 March 1992	Manchester City	H	4–0	Ferdinand 19' 55', Wilson 38 '(pen), Barker 87'	10,779	13
11 March 1992	Leeds United	H	4–1	Ferdinand, Allen, Sinton, Wilson (pen)	14,641	12
14 March 1992	Aston Villa	A	1–0	Ferdinand 75'	19,630	8
21 March 1992	West Ham United	A	2–2	Allen (2)	20,401	9
28 March 1992	Manchester United	H	0–0		22,603	9
4 April 1992	Southampton	A	1–2	Ferdinand	15,205	11
11 April 1992	Tottenham Hotspur	H	1–2	Sinton	20,678	14
18 April 1992	Chelsea	A	1–2	Allen 87'	18,932	16
20 April 1992	Luton Town	H	2–1	Ferdinand (2)	10,749	14
25 April 1992	Nottingham Forest	A	1–1	Allen	22,228	14
2 May 1992	Crystal Palace	H	1–0	Humphrey (own goal)	14,903	11

=== FA Cup ===
Round	Date	Opponent	Venue	Result F–A	Scorers	Attendance
R3	4 January 1992	Southampton (First Division)	A	0–2		13,710

=== Football League Cup ===
Round	Date	Opponent	Venue	Result F–A	Scorers	Attendance
R2 1st leg	24 September 1991	Hull City (Third Division)	A	3–0	Thompson, Barker (2)	4,979
R2 2nd leg	9 October 1991	Hull City (Third Division)	H	5–1 (won 8–1 on agg)	Bardsley, Thompson (2), Bailey (2)	5,251
R3	29 October 1991	Manchester City (First Division)	A	0–0		19,065
R3R	20 November 1991	Manchester City (First Division)	H	1–3	Penrice 6'	11,033

=== Full Members Cup ===
Round	Date	Opponent	Venue	Result F–A	Scorers	Attendance
SR2	23 October 1991	Norwich City	A	2–1	Sinton, Impey	4,436
SQF	26 November 1991	Crystal Palace	H	2–3	Bardsley, Wilkins	4,492

=== Friendlies ===
Date	Country	Opponents	Venue	Result F–A	Scorers	Attendance
22 July 1991		Gloucester City	A			
28 July 1991	Sweden	Edsbro IF	A	5–0	Wegerle (25), Sinton (34), Ferdinand (44), Allen (65, 89).	600
29 July 1991	Sweden	IK Viljan	A	4–0		
31 July 1991	Sweden	IFK Kumla	A	7–1		
3 August 1991	Sweden	Krylbo IF	A	11–0		
7 August 1991		Aldershot	A			
9 August 1991		Watford	A			
10 August 1991	John Maurice Testimonial	Millwall	A			
15 January 1992		Cambridge United	A			
22 April 1992	Mike Leach Benefit Match	QPR Select XI	H			

== Squad ==
Position	Nationality	Name	League Appearances	League Goals	Cup Appearances	League.Cup Goals	F.A.Cup Goals	Total Appearances	Total Goals
GK	TCH	Jan Stejskal	41		6			47	
GK	WAL	Tony Roberts	1		1			2	
DF	ENG	Robbie Herrera						1	
DF	ENG	Justin Channing			1			1	
DF	WAL	Karl Ready	1		1			2	
DF	NIR	Alan Mcdonald	27		3			31	
DF	ENG	Rufus Brevett	6		1			8	
DF	ENG	Clive Wilson	40	3	7			47	3
DF	ENG	David Bardsley	41		7	1		48	1
DF	ENG	Andy Tillson			3			13	
DF	JAM	Danny Maddix	19		5			24	
DF	ENG	Darren Peacock	39	1	7			46	1
DF	ENG	Alan McCarthy	3					3	
MF	ENG	Ray Wilkins	26	1	3			30	1
MF	ENG	Andrew Impey	13		1			17	
MF	ENG	Simon Barker	31	4	7	1		41	5
MF	ENG	Ian Holloway	34		5			46	
FW	ENG	Les Ferdinand	21	10	2			26	10
FW	ENG	Gary Thompson	10	1	4	3		19	4
FW	ENG	Dennis Bailey	19	9	5	2		29	11
FW	ENG	Andy Sinton	38	3	5			43	3
FW	NGA	Dominic Iorfa						1	
FW	USA	Roy Wegerle	18	5	2			23	5
FW	ENG	Paul Walsh	2					2	
FW	WAL	Michael Meaker						1	
FW	ENG	Bradley Allen	10	5	1			11	5
FW	ENG	Gary Penrice	13	3	2			22	3

== Transfers Out ==
Name	from	Date	Fee	Date	Club	Fee
Mark Falco	Glasgow Rangers	4 Dec 1987	£350,000	August 1991	Millwall	£175,000
Paul Parker	Fulham	18 June 1987	£400,000	8 August 1991	Manchester U	£2,000,000
Paul Walsh	Tottenham	13 Sep 1991	Loan	Oct 91	Tottenham	Loan
Tony Witter	Crystal Palace	19 August 1991	£125,000	12 November 1991	Millwall	£100,000
Dominic Iorfa	Royal Antwerp	March 1990	£145,000	1 December 1991	Galatasaray	£100,000
Robbie Herrera	Queens Park Rangers Juniors	March 1988		March 1992	Torquay United	
Roy Wegerle	Luton Town	11 Dec 1989	£1,000,000	March 1992	Blackburn Rovers	£1,100,000
Bobby Bowry	Carshalton Athletic	August 1990		4 April 1992	Crystal Palace	Free transfer
Paul Vowles	Queens Park Rangers Juniors	13 Mar 1990		Apr 92	Briton Ferry Athletic	Free
Paul Bromage	Queens Park Rangers Juniors	July1991		Apr 92	Briton Ferry Athletic	Free
Michael Rutherford	Queens Park Rangers Juniors	Dec1989		Apr 92	Welling U	Free
Brian Law	Queens Park Rangers Juniors	15 Aug 1987		May 92	Retired (Injury) *	£134,000
David Macchiochi	Queens Park Rangers Juniors	28 Nov 1989		June 92	Orient	Free

== Transfers In ==
Name	from	Date	Fee
Paul Bromage	Queens Park Rangers Juniors	July1991	
Ian Holloway	Bristol Rovers	12 August 1991	£230,000
Tony Witter	Crystal Palace	19 August 1991	£125,000
Garry Thompson	Crystal Palace	19 August 1991	£125,000
Paul Walsh	Tottenham	13 Sep 1991	Loan
Gary Penrice	Aston Villa	29 October 1991	£625,000
Gary Waddock	Millwall	20 December 1991	Free transfer
Darren Finlay	Queens Park Rangers Juniors	May1992	
Doug Freedman	Queens Park Rangers Juniors	15 May 1992	
Steve Gallen	Queens Park Rangers Juniors	June1992	

Transfers in: ▼£1,280,000 Transfers out: ▲£2,100,000
Total spending: ▲£820,000
