= 1993–94 Queens Park Rangers F.C. season =

English football club season

Queens Park Rangers
1993–94 season
- Chairman: Richard Thompson
- Manager: Gerry Francis
- Stadium: Loftus Road
- Premier League: 9th
- South East Counties League: Winners
- FA Cup: Third round
- League Cup: Fourth round
- Top goalscorer: League: Les Ferdinand (16); All: Les Ferdinand (18)
- Highest home attendance: 19365 18 August 1993 Liverpool
- Lowest home attendance: 6,314 5 October Barnet
- Average home league attendance: 14,228
- Biggest win: 5-1 Vs Coventry City (23 October 1993)
- Biggest defeat: 0-4 Vs Leeds United (4 April 1994)
Home colours	Away colours	Third colours

During the 1993–94 English football season, Queens Park Rangers F.C. competed in the Premier League. They finished the season in 9th place.

== Season summary ==
Queens Park Rangers finished ninth in the league table, a year after they had finished above all the other London clubs in fifth place. Manager Gerry Francis was even linked with the England job when Graham Taylor quit, but it went to Terry Venables - a former QPR manager himself.

Striker Les Ferdinand was the leading scorer, and his performances attracted transfer speculation and discussion of an England call-up. The rest of the squad performed solidly without attracting many headlines.

== Kit ==
Clubhouse become QPR's new kit manufacturers and electronics company CSF became new kit sponsors.

== Final league table ==
Pos	Team	Pld	W	D	L	GF	GA	GD	Pts	Qualification or relegation
7	Sheffield Wednesday	42	16	16	10	76	54	+22	64	
8	Liverpool	42	17	9	16	59	55	+4	60	
9	Queens Park Rangers	42	16	12	14	62	61	+1	60	
10	Aston Villa	42	15	12	15	46	50	−4	57	Qualification for the UEFA Cup first round (Note: Aston Villa qualified for the UEFA Cup as League Cup winners.)
11	Coventry City	42	14	14	14	43	45	−2	56	

Source: Premier League
Rules for classification: 1) points; 2) goal difference; 3) number of goals scored.

== Results ==
Queens Park Rangers' score comes first

=== Legend ===
Win	Draw	Loss

=== FA Premier League ===
Date	Opponents	Venue	Result F–A	Scorers	Attendance	Position
14 August 1993	Aston Villa	A	1–4	Ferdinand 44'	32,994	21
18 August 1993	Liverpool	H	1–3	Wilkins 25'	19,365	20
21 August 1993	Southampton	H	2–1	Penrice 13', Wilson 46' pen	10,613	15
25 August 1993	Chelsea	A	0–2		20,191	19
28 August 1993	West Ham United	A	4–0	Peacock, Ferdinand (2), Penrice	18,084	14
1 September 1993	Sheffield United	H	2–1	Sinclair, Wilson (pen)	11,113	12
11 September 1993	Manchester City	A	0–3		24,445	15
18 September 1993	Norwich City	H	2–2	Sinclair, Ferdinand	13,359	15
27 September 1993	Wimbledon	A	1–1	McDonald	9,478	16
2 October 1993	Ipswich Town	H	3–0	White (2), Barker	12,292	12
16 October 1993	Newcastle United	A	2–1	Ferdinand, Allen	33,926	8
23 October 1993	Coventry City	H	5–1	Allen (2), Ferdinand, Impey, Barker	12,976	5
30 October 1993	Manchester United	A	1–2	Allen 8'	44,663	8
6 November 1993	Blackburn Rovers	H	1–0	Hendry (own goal)	17,636	7
20 November 1993	Everton	A	3–0	Allen 26, 51, 83	13,860	4
24 November 1993	Swindon Town	A	0–1		14,674	8
27 November 1993	Tottenham Hotspur	H	1–1	Ferdinand	17,694	8
4 December 1993	Aston Villa	H	2–2	McGrath 6' (own goal), Penrice 40'	14,915	8
8 December 1993	Liverpool	A	2–3	Ferdinand 10 ', Barker 46'	24,561	9
11 December 1993	Southampton	A	1–0	Ferdinand	11,946	6
20-Dec-93	Chelsea	H	PP			
27 December 1993	Oldham Athletic	H	2–0	White, Penrice	13,218	6
29 December 1993	Leeds United	A	1–1	Meaker	39,106	6
1 January 1994	Sheffield Wednesday	H	1–2	Ferdinand	16,858	8
3 January 1994	Arsenal	A	0–0		34,935	9
16 January 1994	Newcastle United	H	1–2	Penrice	15,774	10
22 January 1994	Coventry City	A	1–0	White 26'	12,107	8
5 February 1994	Manchester United	H	2–3	Ferdinand 65', Wilson 45'(pen)	21,267	10
19 February 1994	West Ham United	H	PP			
26 February 1994	Sheffield United	A	PP			
5 March 1994	Manchester City	H	1–1	Penrice 28'	13,474	10
12 March 1994	Norwich City	A	4–3	Barker, White, Peacock, Penrice	16,499	10
16 March 1994	Sheffield United	A	1–1	Barker	14,183	10
19 March 1994	Wimbledon	H	1–0	Peacock	11,368	8
26 March 1994	Ipswich Town	A	3–1	Impey 64',69', Ferdinand 71'	15,182	7
30 March 1994	Arsenal	H	PP			
2 April 1994	Oldham Athletic	A	1–4	Ferdinand	10,440	9
4 April 1994	Leeds United	H	0–4		13,365	10
9 April 1994	Sheffield Wednesday	A	1–3	White	22,437	10
13 April 1994	Chelsea	H	1–1	Ferdinand 66'	15,735	10
16 April 1994	Everton	H	2–1	White 67', Ferdinand 88'	13,330	10
24 April 1994	Blackburn Rovers	A	1–1	Ready	19,913	9
27 April 1994	Arsenal	H	1–1	Penrice 3'	11,442	9
30 April 1994	Swindon Town	H	1–3	Ferdinand 73'	9,875	9
3 May 1994	West Ham United	H	0–0		10,850	9
7 May 1994	Tottenham Hotspur	A	2–1	Sinclair (2)	26,105	9

=== FA Cup ===
Round	Date	Opponent	Venue	Result F–A	Goalscorers	Attendance
Third round	8 January 1994	Stockport County (Second Division)	A	1–2	Barker	7,569

=== Coca-Cola Cup ===
Round	Date	Opponent	Venue	Result F–A	Goalscorers	Attendance
Second round (first leg)	21 September 1993	Barnet (Second Division)	A	2–1	Ferdinand, Barker	3,569
Second round (second leg)	5 October 1993	Barnet (Second Division)	H	4–0 (won 6–1 on agg)	Allen (3), Impey	6,314
Third round	27 October 1993	Millwall (First Division)	H	3–0	Sinclair, Barker, Ferdinand	14,190
Fourth round	1 December 1993	Sheffield Wednesday (FA Premiership)	H	1–2	Meaker	13,253

=== Friendlies ===
Date	Country	Opponents	Venue	Result F–A	Scorers	Attendance
21-Jul-1993	Sweden	GAIS	A	3-1		1,617
23-Jul-1993	Sweden	Myresjö IF	A	7-2		830
25-Jul-93	Sweden	Hvidovre	A	2-0		1,419
26-Jul-1993	Sweden	IF Leikin	A	6-1	Penrice 4', White 27', 62', 63', Brevett 42', Sinton 46'	1,411
28-Jul-1993	Sweden	IFK Göteborg	A			
31-Jul-1993		Bournemouth	A			
4-Aug-1993	Nigel Gibbs Testimonial	Watford	A			
7-Aug-1993	Oxford Centenary match	Oxford United	A			
13-Nov-1993		Dorchester Town	A			
26-Feb-1994		Millwall	H			

South East Counties League Cup

Date	Country	Opponents	Venue	Result F–A	Scorers	Attendance
	Final 1st leg	West Ham United	A	3-2	Bryan, Plummer, Gallen	
	Final 2nd leg	West Ham United	H	3-2	Wood , Gallen 2	3,795

== Squad ==
Position	Squad Number	Nationality	Name	League Appearances	League Goals	Coca-Cola Cup Appearances	Coca-Cola Cup Goals	F.A.Cup Appearances	F.A.Cup Goals	Total Appearances	Total Goals
GK	13	CZE	Jan Stejskal	26		5		1		31	
GK	1	WAL	Tony Roberts	16				1		17	
DF	21	ENG	Tony Witter	1						1	
DF	18	WAL	Karl Ready	17	1					20	
DF	6	NIR	Alan McDonald	12	1	4				16	1
DF	25	ENG	Alan McCarthy	4						4	
DF	16	ENG JAM	Danny Maddix								
DF	15	ENG	Rufus Brevett	3		5				8	
DF	3	ENG	Clive Wilson	42	3	4		1		47	3
DF	2	ENG	David Bardsley	34		4		1		39	
DF	24	ENG	Steve Yates	27				1		30	
DF	5	ENG	Darren Peacock	30	3	4		1		35	3
MF	4	ENG	Ray Wilkins	39	1	4		1		44	1
MF	7	ENG	Andrew Impey	31	3	3	1	1		38	4
MF	14	ENG	Simon Barker	35	5	5	2	1	1	42	8
MF	20	ENG	Maurice Doyle	1						1	
MF	11	ENG	Trevor Sinclair	30	4	3	1	1		36	5
MF	8	ENG	Ian Holloway	19		7				26	
FW	9	ENG	Les Ferdinand	35	16	3	2	1		40	18
FW	19	ENG	Devon White	12	7	1				20	7
FW	22	WAL	Michael Meaker	11	1	1	1	1		16	2
FW	10	ENG	Bradley Allen	14	7	3	3			23	10
FW	12	ENG	Gary Penrice	23	8	1		1		28	8
FW	17	ENG	Dennis Bailey								

=== Reserve squad ===
Note: Flags indicate national team as defined under FIFA eligibility rules; some limited exceptions apply. Players may hold more than one non-FIFA nationality.

No.	Pos.	Nation	Player
—	DF	ENG	Marvin Bryan
—	DF	ENG	Robbie Herrera
—	FW	ENG	Danny Dichio

No.	Pos.	Nation	Player
—	FW	ENG	Kevin Gallen
—	FW	SCO	Dougie Freedman

== Transfers Out ==
Name	from	Date	Fee	Date	Club	Fee
Garry Thompson	Crystal Palace	Aug 16,1991	£100,000	August 1993	Cardiff	Free
Andy Sinton	Brentford	Mar 23,1989	£350,000	August 1993	Sheffield Wednesday	£2.750,000
Dennis Bailey	Birmingham City	2 July 1991	£175,000	October 1993	Charlton Athletic	Loan
Alan McCarthy	Queens Park Rangers Juniors	December 1989		November 1993	Watford	Loan
Brian Croft	Chester City	August 1992	£60,000	December 1993	Shrewsbury Town	Loan
Alan McCarthy	Queens Park Rangers Juniors	December 1989		February 1994	Plymouth Argyle	Loan
Dennis Bailey	Birmingham City	2 July 1991	£175,000	March 1994	Watford	Loan
Robert Herrera	Queens Park Rangers Juniors	February 1988		March 1994	Fulham	£60,000
Darren Peacock	Hereford United	December 21,1990	£200,000	24 March 1994	Newcastle United	£2.700,000
Ray Wilkins	Glasgow Rangers	November 28,1989	Free	26 May 1994	Crystal Palace	Free transfer
Darren Finlay	Queens Park Rangers Juniors	May 1992		June 94	Doncaster	Free
Steve Gallen	Queens Park Rangers Juniors	June 1992		June 94	Doncaster	Free

== Transfers In ==
Name	from	Date	Fee
Steve Yates	Bristol Rovers	Aug 17,1993	£650,000
Trevor Sinclair	Blackpool	Aug 13,1993	£600,000
