= 1995–96 Queens Park Rangers F.C. season =

English football club season

Queens Park Rangers F.C.
1995–96 season
- Chairman: Peter Ellis
- Manager: Ray Wilkins
- Stadium: Loftus Road
- FA Premier League: 19th
- FA Cup: Fourth round
- League Cup: Fourth round
- Top goalscorer: League: Danny Dichio (10); All: Danny Dichio (11)
- Highest home attendance: 18,828 vs West Ham United (27 April 1996, FA Premier League)
- Lowest home attendance: 9,207 vs Oxford United (3 October 1995, League Cup)
- Average home league attendance: 15,683
- Biggest win: 3-0 Vs Southampton (5 April 1996), West Ham United (27 April 1996)
- Biggest defeat: 0-3 Vs Wimbledon (23 August 1995), Sheffield Wednesday (9 September 1995), Arsenal (26 December 1995), Nottingham Forest (5 May 1996)
Home colours	Away colours	Third colours

During the 1995–96 English football season, Queens Park Rangers competed in the FA Premier League.

== Season summary ==
One player never makes a team, but QPR felt the loss of prolific striker Les Ferdinand following his £6 million move to Newcastle United.

The last three seasons had seen QPR finish fifth, ninth and eighth in the FA Premier League thanks largely to Ferdinand's goals, but the new strike partnership of Kevin Gallen and Danny Dichio failed to provide anywhere near as many goals as QPR had managed while Ferdinand was up front. Even the support of excellent winger Trevor Sinclair could not translate into a strong supply of goals, and it was soon clear that player-manager Ray Wilkins and his men were in for a hard season.

A 3–0 win over London rivals West Ham United in late April was not enough to keep QPR up, and their relegation was confirmed after 13 years in the top flight.

Hopes of QPR gaining a quick return to the Premier League were given a major boost by the confirmation that Gallen, Dichio and Sinclair were to stay at the club.

== Kit ==
View From became QPR's new kit manufacturers. American electronics company Compaq remained as kit sponsors.

== Final league table ==
Pos	Team	Pld	W	D	L	GF	GA	GD	Pts	Qualification or relegation
16	Coventry City	38	8	14	16	42	60	−18	38	
17	Southampton	38	9	11	18	34	52	−18	38	
18	Manchester City (R)	38	9	11	18	33	58	−25	38	Relegation to Football League First Division
19	Queens Park Rangers (R)	38	9	6	23	38	57	−19	33	Relegation to Football League First Division
20	Bolton Wanderers (R)	38	8	5	25	39	71	−32	29	Relegation to Football League First Division

Source: Premier League
Rules for classification: 1) points; 2) goal difference; 3) number of goals scored.
(R) Relegated

Results summary

Overall								Home						Away					
Pld	W	D	L	GF	GA	GD	Pts	W	D	L	GF	GA	GD	W	D	L	GF	GA	GD
38	9	6	23	38	57	−19	33	6	5	8	25	26	−1	3	1	15	13	31	−18

Source: Statto

Results by matchday

Match	1	2	3	4	5	6	7	8	9	10	11	12	13	14	15	16	17	18	19	20	21	22	23	24	25	26	27	28	29	30	31	32	33	34	35	36	37	38
Ground	A	H	H	A	H	A	H	A	H	A	H	A	H	A	A	H	A	H	H	A	A	H	H	A	A	H	A	H	H	A	H	A	H	A	H	A	H	A
Result	L	L	W	L	L	W	L	W	L	L	D	L	D	L	L	D	L	W	W	L	L	L	L	L	L	L	W	D	L	L	D	D	W	L	W	L	W	L
Position	17	20	15	16	18	15	15	12	13	15	14	15	16	16	18	17	18	16	16	17	18	19	19	19	19	19	19	19	19	19	19	20	18	19	18	19	19	19

Source: Statto.com
A = Away; H = Home; W = Win; D = Draw; L = Loss

== Results ==
Queens Park Rangers' score comes first

=== Legend ===
Win	Draw	Loss

=== FA Premier League ===
Date	Opponents	Venue	Result F–A	Scorers	Attendance	Position
19 August 1995	Blackburn Rovers	A	0–1		22,860	17
23 August 1995	Wimbledon	H	0–3		11,837	20
26 August 1995	Manchester City	H	1–0	Barker 32'	14,212	15
30 August 1995	Liverpool	A	0–1		37,548	16
9 September 1995	Sheffield Wednesday	H	0–3		12,459	18
16 September 1995	Leeds United	A	3–1	Dichio (2), Sinclair	31,504	15
25 September 1995	Tottenham Hotspur	H	2–3	Dichio, Impey	15,659	15
30 September 1995	Bolton Wanderers	A	1–0	Dichio	17,362	12
14 October 1995	Newcastle United	H	2–3	Dichio (2)	18,254	15
21 October 1995	Middlesbrough	A	0–1		29,293	16
25 October 1995	Nottingham Forest	H	PP			
28 October 1995	Nottingham Forest	H	1–1	Sinclair	17,549	14
4 November 1995	Southampton	A	0–2		15,137	16
19 November 1995	Coventry City	H	1–1	Barker	11,189	16
22 November 1995	Everton	A	0–2		30,009	16
25 November 1995	West Ham United	A	0–1		21,504	18
2 December 1995	Middlesbrough	H	1–1	McDonald	17,546	18
9 December 1995	Tottenham Hotspur	A	0–1		28,851	18
16 December 1995	Bolton Wanderers	H	2–1	Osborn, Impey	11,456	17
23 December 1995	Aston Villa	H	1–0	Gallen 54'	14,778	16
26 December 1995	Arsenal	A	0–3		38,259	17
30 December 1995	Manchester United	A	1–2	Dichio 68'	41,890	18
2 January 1996	Chelsea	H	1–2	Allen 70'	14,904	19
13 January 1996	Blackburn Rovers	H	0–1		13,957	19
20 January 1996	Wimbledon	A	1–2	Hateley	9,123	19
3 February 1996	Manchester City	A	0–2		27,509	19
11 February 1996	Liverpool	H	1–2	Dichio 66'	18,405	19
17 February 1996	Sheffield Wednesday	A	3–1	Barker (2), Goodridge	22,442	19
24 February 1996	Leeds United	H	PP			
2 March 1996	Arsenal	H	1–1	Gallen	17,970	19
6 March 1996	Leeds United	H	1–2	Gallen	13,991	19
9 March 1996	Aston Villa	A	2–4	Dichio 50', Gallen 59'	28,221	19
16 March 1996	Manchester United	H	1–1	Irwin 64'(own goal)	18,817	19
23 March 1996	Chelsea	A	1–1	Barker 19'	25,590	20
5 April 1996	Southampton	H	3–0	Brevett, Dichio, Gallen	17,615	18
8 April 1996	Newcastle United	A	1–2	Holloway	36,583	19
13 April 1996	Everton	H	3–1	Gallen, Hateley, Impey	18,349	18
17 April 1996	Coventry City	A	0–1		22,910	19
27 April 1996	West Ham United	H	3–0	Ready, Gallen (2)	18,828	19
5 May 1996	Nottingham Forest	A	0–3		22,910	19

=== FA Cup ===
Round	Date	Opponent	Venue	Result F–A	Scorers	Attendance
R3	6 January 1996	Tranmere Rovers (First Division)	A	2–0	Quashie, Sinclair	10,230
R4	29 January 1996	Chelsea (FA Premiership)	H	1–2	Quashie 67'	18,542

=== Coca-Cola Cup ===
Round	Date	Opponent	Venue	Result F–A	Scorers	Attendance
R2 1st Leg	19 September 1995	Oxford United (Second Division)	A	1–1	Dichio	7,477
R2 2nd Leg	3 October 1995	Oxford United (Second Division)	H	2–1 (won 3–2 on agg)	Ready, Gallen	9,207
R3	25 October 1995	York City (Second Division)	H	3–1	Sinclair, Impey, Atkin O.G.	12,972
R4	29 November 1995	Aston Villa (FA Premiership)	A	0–1		24,951

=== Friendlies ===
Date	Country	Opponents	Venue	Result F–A	Scorers	Attendance
22-Jul-95		Aylesbury United v Queens Park Rangers	A			
25-Jul-95		Leyton Orient v Queens Park Rangers	A			
29-Jul-95		Charlton Athletic v Queens Park Rangers	A			
2-Aug-95	Dean Wilkins Testimonial	Brighton & Hove Albion v Queens Park Rangers	A			
5-Aug-95		Crystal Palace v Queens Park Rangers	A			
7-Aug-95		Millwall v Queens Park Rangers	A			
12-Aug-95		Hibernian v Queens Park Rangers	A	1-2	Dichio	

== Squad ==
Position	Squad Number	Nationality	Name	League Appearances	League Goals	Cup Appearances	Coca-Cola Cup Goals	F.A.Cup Goals	Total Appearances	Total Goals
GK	25	USA	Juergen Sommer	33		2			35	
GK	1	WAL	Tony Roberts	5		4			9	
GK	13	HOL	Sieb Dijkstra							
DF	6	ENG	Danny Maddix	20		3			27	
DF	24	ENG	Trevor Challis	10		2			13	
DF	14	WAL	Karl Ready	16	1	5	1		27	2
DF	5	NIR	Alan McDonald	25	1	5			31	1
DF	3	ENG	Rufus Brevett	27	1	3			30	1
DF	27	ENG	Matt Brazier	6		2			14	
DF	2	ENG	David Bardsley	28		3			32	
DF	21	ENG	Steve Yates	30		4			34	
DF	23	AUS	Andy McDermott							
DF	29	ENG	Chris Plummer						1	
MF	20	ENG	Ray Wilkins	11		3			19	
MF	12	ENG	Paul Murray	1					1	
MF	7	ENG	Andrew Impey	28	3	6	1		35	4
MF	4	ENG	Simon Barker	33	5	4			37	5
MF	15	ENG	Simon Osborn	6	1	2			11	1
MF	16	AUS	Ned Zelic	3		1			4	
MF	11	ENG	Trevor Sinclair	37	2	5	1	1	42	4
MF	8	ENG	Ian Holloway	26	1	3			30	1
MF	19	ENG	Steve Hodge							
FW	26	ENG	Mark Hateley	10	2	1			16	2
FW	22	ENG	Lee Charles						4	
FW	10	ENG	Kevin Gallen	26	8	2	1		32	9
FW	19	ENG	Nigel Quashie	11		2		2	13	2
FW	17	ENG	Bradley Allen	5	1	2			10	1
FW	12	ENG	Gary Penrice						3	
FW	18	BRB	Gregory Goodridge		1				9	1
FW	9	ENG	Danny Dichio	21	10	3	1		33	11

=== Reserve squad ===
Note: Flags indicate national team as defined under FIFA eligibility rules; some limited exceptions apply. Players may hold more than one non-FIFA nationality.

No.	Pos.	Nation	Player
—	DF	ENG	Matt Lockwood
—	DF	ENG	Mark Perry

No.	Pos.	Nation	Player
—	DF	ENG	Graeme Power

Transfers in: ▼£4,937,500
Transfers out: ▲£2,275,000
Total spending: ▼£2,662,500

== Transfers Out ==
Name	from	Date	Fee	Date	Club	Fee
Clive Wilson	Chelsea	July 3, 1990	£450,000	July 1995	Tottenham Hotspur	Free transfer
Michael Meaker	Queens Park Rangers Juniors	Feb 7,1990		July 1995	Reading	£550,000
Peter Caldwell	Queens Park Rangers Juniors	Mar 9,1990		July 95	Leyton Orient	Free
Dennis Bailey	Birmingham City	2 July 1991	£175,000	1 August 1995	Gillingham	Free transfer
Marvin Bryan	Queens Park Rangers Juniors	Aug 15,1992		10 August 1995	Blackpool	£20,000
Alan McCarthy	Queens Park Rangers Juniors	Dec 8,1989		14 August 1995	Leyton Orient	£25,000
Brian Croft	Chester City	Aug 20,1992	£60,000	14 August 1995	Torquay United	Free transfer
Sieb Dijkstra	Motherwell	22 July 1994	£250,000	September 1995	Bristol City	Loan
Gary Penrice	Aston Villa	29 October 1991	£625,000	15 November 1995	Watford	£300,000
Steve Hodge	Leeds United	28 October 1994	£300,000	15 December 1995	Watford	Free transfer
Ned Zelic	Borussia Mönchengladbach	26 July 1995	£1,250,000	15 December 1995	Eintracht Frankfurt	£1,000,000
Simon Osborn	Reading	10 July 1995	£1,100,000	December 1995	Wolverhampton Wanderers	£1,000,000
Bradley Allen	Queens Park Rangers Juniors	Sep 30,1988		28 March 1996	Charlton Athletic	£400,000
Ian Holloway	Bristol Rovers	12 August 1991	£230,000	June 96	Bristol Rovers	Free
John Cross	Queens Park Rangers Juniors	July1994		June 96	Cardiff	Free
Graeme Power	Queens Park Rangers Juniors	Apr 11,1995		June 96	Bristol Rovers	Free
Matt Lockwood	Queens Park Rangers Juniors	May 2, 1995		June 96	Bristol Rovers	Free
Steve Parmenter	Queens Park Rangers Juniors	May 2, 1995		June 96	Bristol Rovers	Free

== Transfers In ==
Name	from	Date	Fee
Simon Osborn	Reading	10 July 1995	£1,100,000
Ned Zelic	Borussia Mönchengladbach	26 July 1995	£1,250,000
Nigel Quashie	Queens Park Rangers Juniors	July 20, 1995	
Lee Charles	Chertsey Town	4 August 1995	£67,500
Andy McDermott	Australian Institute of Sport	5 August 1995	£20,000
Gregory Goodridge	Torquay United	9 August 1995	£100,000
Juergen Sommer	Luton Town	29 August 1995	£600,000
Nigel Quashie	Queens Park Rangers Juniors	August 1995	
Lee Sharp	Lincoln United	27 October 1995	
Mark Perry	Queens Park Rangers Juniors	Oct 19,1995	
Mark Hateley	Rangers	3 November 1995	£1,500,000
Paul Murray	Carlisle	Mar 8,1996	Loan
Paul Murray	Carlisle United	2 May 1996	£300,000
