= 1994–95 Queens Park Rangers F.C. season =

English football club season

Queens Park Rangers
1994–95 season
- Chairman: Richard Thompson
- Manager: Gerry Francis (until 11 November); Ray Wilkins (from 15 November)
- Stadium: Loftus Road
- FA Premier League: 8th
- FA Cup: Quarter finals
- League Cup: Third round
- Top goalscorer: League: Les Ferdinand (24); All: Les Ferdinand (26)
- Highest home attendance: 18,948 vs Manchester United, Premier League, 10 December 1994
- Lowest home attendance: 6,561 vs Carlisle United, League Cup, 5 October 1994
- Average home league attendance: 14,613
- Biggest win: 4-0 Vs Aylesbury United (7 January 1995)
- Biggest defeat: 0-4 Vs Blackburn Rovers (26 November 1994), Leeds United (24 January 1995)
Home colours	Away colours

During the 1994–95 English football season, Queens Park Rangers F.C. competed in the Premier League. They finished the season in 8th place.

== Season summary ==
When manager Gerry Francis moved across London to take charge of Tottenham Hotspur in November, there was much speculation as to who would replace him at Loftus Road. That question was answered within days when the club's board announced that Ray Wilkins, 38, had been appointed as player-manager - just months after he had left the club to become player-coach at Crystal Palace.

Wilkins kept QPR in contention for a UEFA Cup place, and in the end they finished eighth - just three places short of the promised land. This could easily have been achieved had it not been for a nine-match winless run during the season - longer than any winless run in the Premier League that season. He also took them to the quarter-finals of the FA Cup, where they bowed out to Manchester United.

Prolific goalscorer Les Ferdinand was, perhaps inevitably, sold in the summer - subject of a £6 million move to Newcastle United. Wilkins did not delve into the club's funds to buy a replacement, preferring to make the most of young talent like Danny Dichio and Kevin Gallen.

== Kit ==
Clubhouse remained QPR's kit manufacturers. American electronics company Compaq became new kit sponsors.

== Final league table ==
Pos	Team	Pld	W	D	L	GF	GA	GD	Pts	Qualification or relegation
6	Newcastle United	42	20	12	10	67	47	+20	72	
7	Tottenham Hotspur	42	16	14	12	66	58	+8	62	Qualification for the Intertoto Cup group stage
8	Queens Park Rangers	42	17	9	16	61	59	+2	60	
9	Wimbledon	42	15	11	16	48	65	−17	56	Qualification for the Intertoto Cup group stage
10	Southampton	42	12	18	12	61	63	−2	54	

Source: Premier League
Rules for classification: 1) points; 2) goal difference; 3) number of goals scored.

Results summary

Overall								Home						Away					
Pld	W	D	L	GF	GA	GD	Pts	W	D	L	GF	GA	GD	W	D	L	GF	GA	GD
42	17	9	16	61	59	+2	60	11	3	7	36	26	+10	6	6	9	25	33	−8

Source: Statto

Results by matchday

Match	1	2	3	4	5	6	7	8	9	10	11	12	13	14	15	16	17	18	19	20	21	22	23	24	25	26	27	28	29	30	31	32	33	34	35	36	37	38	39	40	41	42
Ground	A	H	H	A	H	A	H	A	A	H	A	H	H	A	H	A	H	H	A	A	H	A	A	A	H	A	H	A	H	H	H	H	A	H	H	A	A	A	H	H	H	A
Result	L	W	L	D	D	D	L	L	D	L	L	W	W	L	W	L	W	L	W	D	D	W	L	L	W	D	D	W	W	W	L	W	W	L	W	W	L	L	L	D	W	W
Position	19	11	15	14	13	12	15	18	17	19	20	17	15	16	18	18	16	17	13	16	16	14	15	17	17	16	17	16	14	11	11	9	9	9	9	8	8	8	8	8	8	8

Source: Statto.com
A = Away; H = Home; W = Win; D = Draw; L = Loss

== Results ==
Queens Park Rangers' score comes first

=== Legend ===
Win	Draw	Loss

=== FA Premier League ===
Date	Opponents	Venue	Result F–A	Scorers	Attendance	Position
20 August 1994	Manchester United	A	0–2		43,214	20
24 August 1994	Sheffield Wednesday	H	3–2	Ferdinand, Sinclair, Gallen	12,788	11
27 August 1994	Ipswich Town	H	1–2	Ferdinand	12,456	15
31 August 1994	Leicester City	A	1–1	Willis (own goal)	18,695	14
10 September 1994	Coventry City	H	2–2	Penrice (2)	11,398	13
17 September 1994	Everton	A	2–2	Ferdinand (2)	27,285	12
24 September 1994	Wimbledon	H	0–1		11,059	15
2 October 1994	Nottingham Forest	A	2–3	Ferdinand, Allen	21,449	18
8 October 1994	Tottenham Hotspur	A	1–1	Impey	25,799	17
15 October 1994	Manchester City	H	1–2	Wilson 62'	13,631	19
22 October 1994	Norwich City	A	2–4	Barker, Gallen	19,431	20
29 October 1994	Aston Villa	H	2–0	Dichio 36'Penrice 90'	16,073	18
31 October 1994	Liverpool	H	2–1	Sinclair 29' Ferdinand 84'	18,295	15
5 November 1994	Newcastle United	A	1–2	Dichio	34,278	16
19 November 1994	Leeds United	H	3–2	Ferdinand (2), Gallen	17,416	18
26 November 1994	Blackburn Rovers	A	0–4		21,302	18
4 December 1994	West Ham United	H	2–1	Ferdinand, Sinclair	12,780	16
10 December 1994	Manchester United	H	2–3	Ferdinand 24', 65'	18,948	16
17 December 1994	Sheffield Wednesday	A	2–0	Maddix, Ferdinand	22,766	14
26 December 1994	Crystal Palace	A	0–0		16,372	16
28 December 1994	Southampton	H	2–2	Barker, Gallen	16,078	16
31 December 1994	Arsenal	A	3–1	Gallen 3', Allen 76', Impey 77'	32,393	14
3 January 1995	Chelsea	H	pp			
14 January 1995	Aston Villa	A	1–2	Yates 88'	26,578	15
21 January 1995	Norwich City	H				
24 January 1995	Leeds United	A	0–4		28,780	17
1 February 1995	Chelsea	H				
4 February 1995	Newcastle United	H	3–0	Ferdinand (2), Barker	16,576	17
11 February 1995	Liverpool	A	1–1	Gallen 6'	35,996	16
22 February 1995	West Ham United	A				
26 February 1995	Nottingham Forest	H	1–1	Barker	13,363	17
4 March 1995	Wimbledon	A	3–1	Ferdinand (2), Holloway	9,176	16
8 March 1995	Leicester City	H	2–0	McDonald, Wilson	10,189	14
15 March 1995	Norwich City	H	2–0	Ferdinand, Gallen	10,519	11
18 March 1995	Everton	H	2–3	Ferdinand, Gallen	14,488	11
22 March 1995	Chelsea	H	1-0	Gallen 62'	15,103	9
1 April 1995	Coventry City	A	1–0	Sinclair	15,740	9
4 April 1995	Blackburn Rovers	H	0–1		16,508	9
8 April 1995	Arsenal	H	3–1	Impey, Gallen, Ready	16,341	9
11 April 1995	Ipswich Town	A	1–0	Ferdinand 68'	11,767	8
15 April 1995	Southampton	A	1–2	Ferdinand	15,210	8
17 April 1995	Crystal Palace	H	0–1		14,227	8
29 April 1995	Chelsea	A	0–1		21,704	8
3 May 1995	West Ham United	A	0–0		22,923	8
6 May 1995	Tottenham Hotspur	H	2–1	Ferdinand (2)	18,367	8
14 May 1995	Manchester City	A	3–2	Ferdinand 13', 89' Dichio 80'	27,850	8

=== FA Cup ===
Round	Date	Opponent	Venue	Result F–A	Scorers	Attendance
R3	7 January 1995	Aylesbury United (Isthmian League)	A	4–0	Maddix, Ferdinand, Meaker, Gallen	15,417
R4	28 January 1995	West Ham United (FA Premiership)	H	1–0	Impey	17,694
R5	18 February 1995	Millwall (First Division)	H	1–0	Wilson (pen)	16,457
QF	12 March 1995	Manchester United (FA Premiership)	A	0–2		42,830

=== Coca-Cola Cup ===
Round	Date	Opponent	Venue	Result F–A	Scorers	Attendance
R2 1st Leg	20 September 1994	Carlisle United (Third Division)	A	1–0	Ferdinand	9,570
R2 2nd Leg	5 October 1994	Carlisle United (Third Division)	H	2–0 (won 3–0 on agg)	Allen, Wilson (pen)	6,561
R3	25 October 1994	Manchester City (FA Premiership)	H	3–4	Sinclair 38', Penrice 87', Gallen 1'	11,701

=== Friendlies ===
Date	Country	Opponents	Venue	Result F–A	Scorers	Attendance
25 July 1994	Sweden	Vänersborg v Queens Park Rangers	A			
26 July 1994	Sweden	Ása v Queens Park Rangers	A			
26 July 1994	Sweden	GAIS v Queens Park Rangers	A			
28 July 1994	Sweden	Jonsered v Queens Park Rangers	A			
30 July 1994	Sweden	Färgelanda v Queens Park Rangers	A			
31 July 1994	Sweden	Skövde v Queens Park Rangers	A			
3 August 1994		Brentford v Queens Park Rangers	A			
6 August 1994	Phil Purnell Testimonial	Bristol Rovers v Queens Park Rangers	A			
9 August 1994		Derby County v Queens Park Rangers	A			
19 August 1994		Charlton Athletic v Queens Park Rangers	A			
20 May 1995	Barbados	Barbados v Queens Park Rangers	A			
May 1995	Trinidad	Trinidad & Tobago v Queens Park Rangers	A			

== Squad ==
Position	Squad Number	Nationality	Name	League Appearances	League Goals	Cup Appearances	Coca-Cola Cup Goals	F.A.Cup Goals	Total Appearances	Total Goals
GK	1	WAL	Tony Roberts	31		6			37	
GK	13	HOL	Sieb Dijkstra	11		1			12	
GK	23	ENG	Peter Caldwell							
DF	16	ENG	Danny Maddix	21	1	4		1	32	2
DF	5	WAL	Karl Ready	11	1	4			15	1
DF	6	NIR	Alan McDonald	39	1	7			46	1
DF	15	ENG	Rufus Brevett	17		1			19	
DF	3	ENG	Clive Wilson	36	2	6	1	1	42	4
DF	2	ENG	David Bardsley	30		7			37	
DF	4	ENG	Steve Yates	22	1	4			27	1
DF	18	ENG	Alan McCarthy						2	
DF	29	ENG	Christopher Plummer							
MF	27	ENG	Maurice Doyle							
MF	26	ENG	Ray Wilkins	1		1			2	
MF	7	ENG	Andrew Impey	40	3	6		1	46	4
MF	14	ENG	Simon Barker	37	4	7			44	4
MF	25	ENG	Steve Hodge	15		2			17	
MF	11	ENG	Trevor Sinclair	32	4	4	1		37	5
MF	8	ENG	Ian Holloway	28	1	5			37	1
FW	9	ENG	Les Ferdinand	37	24	5	1	1	42	26
FW	20	ENG	Kevin Gallen	31	10	5	1	1	43	12
FW	22	WAL	Michael Meaker	7		3		1	11	1
FW	10	ENG	Bradley Allen	2	2	1	1		7	3
FW	12	ENG	Gary Penrice	9	3	1	1		22	4
FW	19	ENG	Devon White	1					1	
FW	24	ENG	Danny Dichio	4	3	2			10	3
FW	17	ENG	Dennis Bailey							

=== Reserve squad ===
Note: Flags indicate national team as defined under FIFA eligibility rules; some limited exceptions apply. Players may hold more than one non-FIFA nationality.

No.	Pos.	Nation	Player
—	DF	ENG	Marvin Bryan
—	DF	ENG	Trevor Challis
—	DF	ENG	Chris Plummer

No.	Pos.	Nation	Player
—	DF	ENG	Graeme Power
—	MF	ENG	Matt Brazier

Transfers in: ▼£550,000
Transfers out: ▲£244,000
Total spending: ▼£306,000

== Transfers Out ==
Name	from	Date	Fee	Date	Club	Fee
Dougie Freedman	Dougie Freedman	15 May 1992		26 July 1994	Barnet	£125,000
Jan Stejskal	Sparta Prague	23 July 1990	£625,000	July 1994	Slavia Prague	
Tony Witter	Crystal Palace	16 Aug 1991	£125,000	October 1994	Millwall	£100,000
Devon White	Cambridge United	26 Jan 1993	£100,000	23 December 1994	Notts County	£110,000
Marvin Bryan	Queens Park Rangers Juniors	August 1992		December 1994	Doncaster Rovers	Loan
Brian Law	Queens Park Rangers Juniors	August 1987		23 December 1994	Wolverhampton Wanderers	£134,000
Maurice Doyle	Crewe Alexandra	21 Apr 1989	£80,000	16 May 1995	Millwall	£25,000
Les Ferdinand	Hayes	12 Mar 1987	£50,000	June 1995	Newcastle United.	£6,000,000

== Transfers In ==
Name	from	Date	Fee
Trevor Challis	Queens Park Rangers Juniors	1 July 1994	
Matt Brazier	Queens Park Rangers Juniors	July 1994	
Chris Plummer	Queens Park Rangers Juniors	1 July 1994	
John Cross		July1994	
Sieb Dijkstra	Motherwell	22 July 1994	£250,000
Steve Hodge	Leeds United	28 October 1994	£300,000
Ray Wilkins	Crystal Palace	17 November 1994	Free transfer
Michael Mahoney-Johnson	Queens Park Rangers Juniors	April 1995	
Graeme Power	Queens Park Rangers Juniors	11 Apr 1995	
Matt Lockwood	Queens Park Rangers Juniors	2 May 1995	
Steve Parmenter	Queens Park Rangers Juniors	2 May 1995	
Richard Hurst	Queens Park Rangers Juniors	May1995	
