= 1990–91 Queens Park Rangers F.C. season =

English football club season

Queens Park Rangers
1990–91 season
- Chairman: Richard Thompson
- Manager: Don Howe sacked as head coach 21 May; Gerry Francis appointed manager 28 May
- Stadium: Loftus Road
- First Division: 12th
- FA Cup: Third round
- League Cup: Fourth round
- Top goalscorer: League: Roy Wegerle (18); All: Wegerle (19)
- Highest home attendance: 21,405 (v Tottenham Hotspur, 6 October 1990)
- Lowest home attendance: 8,398 (v Blackburn Rovers, 31 October 1990)
- Average home league attendance: 13,178
- Biggest win: 6-1 Vs Luton Town (15 September 1990)
- Biggest defeat: 0-4 Vs Southampton (20 November 1990)
Home colours	Away colours	Third colours

During the 1990–91 English football season, Queens Park Rangers competed in the First Division for the eighth year running.

== Season summary ==
QPR made a poor start to the season for the third year in a row, losing eight consecutive matches between October and December 1990. They recovered in the new year to finish twelfth in the First Division, with the highlight being a 3–1 win at Anfield against title-chasing Liverpool. They were knocked out of the FA Cup in the third round by Manchester United for the second time in three seasons. Roy Wegerle scored eighteen League goals, including an outstanding solo effort against Leeds United at Elland Road in October 1990.

== Kit ==
Sports brand Influence remained QPR's kit manufacturers and became new kit sponsors.

== Final league table ==
Pos	Team	Pld	W	D	L	GF	GA	GD	Pts	Qualification or relegation
10	Tottenham Hotspur	38	11	16	11	51	50	+1	49	Qualification for the Cup Winners' Cup qualifying round
11	Chelsea	38	13	10	15	58	69	−11	49	
12	Queens Park Rangers	38	12	10	16	44	53	−9	46	
13	Sheffield United	38	13	7	18	36	55	−19	46	
14	Southampton	38	12	9	17	58	69	−11	45	

Source: World Football
Rules for classification: 1) Points; 2) Goal difference; 3) Goals scored

== Results ==
Queens Park Rangers' score comes first

=== Football League First Division ===
Date	Opponents	Venue	Result F–A	Scorers	Attendance	Position
25 August 1990	Nottingham Forest	A	1–1	Wegerle	21,619	12
29 August 1990	Wimbledon	H	0–1		9,762	16
1 September 1990	Chelsea	H	1–0	Wegerle 1' (pen)	19,813	11
8 September 1990	Manchester United	A	1–3	Wegerle 90' (pen)	43,427	15
15 September 1990	Luton Town	H	6–1	Wegerle (2), Sinton, Wilkins, Falco, Parker	10,198	7
22 September 1990	Aston Villa	A	2–2	Wegerle 29'(pen), Sinton 14'	23,301	9
29 September 1990	Coventry City	A	1–3	Ferdinand	9,890	10
6 October 1990	Tottenham Hotspur	H	0–0		21,405	12
20 October 1990	Leeds United	A	3–2	Wegerle 40', 80' Wilkins 29'	27,443	10
27 October 1990	Norwich City	H	1–3	Wegerle (pen)	11,103	11
3 November 1990	Everton	A	0–3		22,352	13
10 November 1990	Southampton	A	1–3	Falco	15,957	15
17 November 1990	Crystal Palace	H	1–2	Wegerle	14,360	16
24 November 1990	Arsenal	H	1–3	Wegerle (pen)	18,555	19
1 December 1990	Manchester City	A	1–2	Sinton 90'	25,080	19
8 December 1990	Wimbledon	A	0–3		5,358	19
15 December 1990	Nottingham Forest	H	1–2	Wegerle (pen)	10,150	19
23 December 1990	Derby County	A	1–1	Wegerle	16,429	19
26 December 1990	Liverpool	H	1–1	Falco 67'	17,848	19
29 December 1990	Sunderland	H	3–2	Maddix, Wegerle, Falco	11,072	17
1 January 1991	Sheffield United	A	0–1		21,158	19
12 January 1991	Chelsea	A	0–2		19,255	19
19 January 1991	Manchester United	H	1–1	Falco 30'	18,544	18
2 February 1991	Luton Town	A	2–1	Ferdinand (2)	8,479	18
9 February 1991	Aston Villa	H	PP			
16 February 1991	Crystal Palace	A	0–0		15,676	18
23 February 1991	Southampton	H	2–1	Ferdinand (2)	11,009	18
2 March 1991	Manchester City	H	1–0	Ferdinand 13'	12,746	17
9 March 1991	Arsenal	A	pp			
16 March 1991	Coventry City	H	1–0	Ferdinand	9,510	17
23 March 1991	Tottenham Hotspur	A	0–0		30,860	17
30 March 1991	Liverpool	A	3–1	Ferdinand 10', Wegerle 45', Wilson 83'	37,251	16
1 April 1991	Derby County	H	1–1	Wegerle (pen)	12,036	16
6 April 1991	Sunderland	A	1–0	Tillson	17,899	12
10 April 1991	Aston Villa	H	2–1	Allen 76', Tillson 78	11,539	9
13 April 1991	Sheffield United	H	1–2	Allen	13,801	12
17 April 1991	Leeds United	H	2–0	Wegerle, Barker	10,998	10
23 April 1991	Arsenal	A	0–2		42,395	9
4 May 1991	Norwich City	A	0–1		13,469	12
11 May 1991	Everton	H	1–1	Wegerle	12,508	12

=== FA Cup ===
Round	Date	Opponent	Venue	Result F–A	Scorers	Attendance
R3	7 January 1991	Manchester United (First Division)	A	1–2	Maddix 40'	35,065

=== Football League Cup ===
Round	Date	Opponent	Venue	Result F–A	Scorers	Attendance
R2 1st leg	26 September 1990	Peterborough United (Fourth Division)	H	3–1	Ferdinand, Maddix, Wegerle	8,714
R2 2nd leg	9 October 1990	Peterborough United (Fourth Division)	A	1–1 (won 4–2 on agg)	Ferdinand	7,545
R3	31 October 1990	Blackburn Rovers (Second Division)	H	2–1	Falco, Barker	8,398
R4	27 November 1990	Leeds United (First Division)	H	0–3		15,832

=== Full Members' Cup ===
Round	Date	Opponent	Venue	Result F–A	Scorers	Attendance
R2	20 November 1990	Southampton	A	0–4		5,071

=== Friendlies ===
Date	Country	Opponents	Venue	Result F–A	Scorers	Attendance
3 August 1990	Sweden	Täby	A			
6 August 1990	Sweden	Västerás SK	A			
8 August 1990	Sweden	Södertälje FF	A			
9 August 1990	Sweden	Upplands SK	A			
11 August 1990		Wembley	A			
14 August 1990		Kingstonian	A			
18 August 1990		Portsmouth	A			
21 August 1990		Wycombe Wanderers	A			

== Squad ==
Position	Nationality	Name	League Appearances	League Goals	Cup Appearances	Rumbelows Cup Goals	F.A.Cup Goals	Total Appearances	Total Goals
GK	TCH	Jan Stejskal	26		2			28	
GK	WAL	Tony Roberts	12		4			16	
DF	ENG	Roberto Herrera	3		1			4	
DF	ENG	Justin Channing	3		1			6	
DF	WAL	Brian Law	3		2			5	
DF	NIR	Alan Mcdonald	17		3			20	
DF	ENG	Rufus Brevett	10					10	
DF	ENG	Paul Parker	13	1	4			21	1
DF	ENG	Kenny Sansom	28		6			34	
DF	ENG	Clive Wilson	11	1	3			17	1
DF	ENG	David Bardsley	38		6			44	
DF	ENG	Andy Tillson	18	2	1			19	2
DF	JAM	Danny Maddix	32	1	4	1	1	36	3
DF	ENG	Gus Caesar	5					5	
DF	ENG	Darren Peacock	19					19	
DF	ENG	Alan McCarthy	1		1			4	
MF	ENG	Ray Wilkins	38	2	6			44	2
MF	ENG	Simon Barker	31	1	5	1		41	2
FW	ENG	Les Ferdinand	15	8	2	2		21	10
FW	ENG	Andy Sinton	38	3	6			44	3
FW	NGA	Dominic Iorfa	1		1			7	
FW	USA	Roy Wegerle	35	18	6	1		41	19
FW	WAL	Michael Meaker						9	
FW	ENG	Bradley Allen	4	2	1			11	2
FW	ENG	Mark Falco	17	5	2	1		22	6

== Transfers Out ==
Name	from	Date	Fee	Date	Club	Fee
Michael Rutherford	Queens Park Rangers Juniors	December 1989		July 1990	Welling United	
Tony Parks	Brentford	31 July 1990	Loan	Oct 90	Brentford	Loan
Gus Caesar	Arsenal	27 Nov 1990	Loan	Jan 91	Arsenal	Loan
Kenny Sansom	Newcastle United	June 1989	£300,000	March 1991	Coventry City	£100,000
Tony Joyce	Queens Park Rangers Juniors	13 Mar 1990		Apr 91	Aldershot	Free
Steve Crocker	Queens Park Rangers Juniors	13 Mar 1990		May 91	Colchester U	Free

== Transfers In ==
Name	from	Date	Fee
Clive Wilson	Chelsea	3 July 1990	£450,000
Jan Stejskal	Sparta Praha (Cze)	23 July 1990	£625,000
Tony Parks	Brentford	31 July 1990	Loan
David McEnroe	Queens Park Rangers Juniors	Aug1990	
Karl Ready	Queens Park Rangers Juniors	13 Aug 1990	
Bobby Bowry	Carshalton Athletic	August 1990	
Gus Caesar	Arsenal	27 Nov 1990	Loan
Andy Tillson	Grimsby	20 Dec 1990	£400,000
Darren Peacock	Hereford United	21 Dec 1990	£200,000
Rufus Brevett	Doncaster	14 Feb 1991	£150,000
Dennis Bailey	Birmingham	28 June 1991	£175,000
