= 1989–90 Queens Park Rangers F.C. season =

English football club season

Queens Park Rangers
1989–90 season
- Chairman: Richard Thompson
- Manager: Trevor Francis, Don Howe
- Stadium: Loftus Road
- First Division: 11th
- FA Cup: Sixth round
- League Cup: Third round
- Top goalscorer: League: Colin Clarke, Andy Sinton, Roy Wegerle (6); All: Clarke (9)
- Highest home attendance: 21,547 (v Arsenal, 31 January 1990)
- Lowest home attendance: 6,745 (v Stockport County, 20 September 1989)
- Average home league attendance: 13,471
- Biggest win: 4-2 Vs Chelsea (9 December 1989)
- Biggest defeat: 1-4 Vs Southampton (14 October 1989)
Home colours	Away colours	Third colours

During the 1989–90 English football season, Queens Park Rangers competed in the First Division for the seventh year running.

== Season summary ==
QPR finished in a mid-table position of 11th in the First Division. After a poor start to the season that saw them win just twice in their first twelve League matches, they sacked their player-manager Trevor Francis and appointed Don Howe in his place. They reached the sixth round of the FA Cup in a run that encompassed nine matches, including five replays, before they were finally knocked out by Liverpool.

== Kit ==
Influence became QPR's new kit manufacturers. Airline KLM continued as kit sponsors. a third unworn shirt was also released

=== Football League First Division ===
Pos	Team	Pld	W	D	L	GF	GA	GD	Pts	Qualification or relegation
9	Nottingham Forest	38	15	9	14	55	47	+8	54	
10	Norwich City	38	13	14	11	44	42	+2	53	
11	Queens Park Rangers	38	13	11	14	45	44	+1	50	
12	Coventry City	38	14	7	17	39	59	−20	49	
13	Manchester United	38	13	9	16	46	47	−1	48	Qualification for the European Cup Winners' Cup first round (Note: Manchester United qualified for the UEFA Cup Winners' Cup as the 1989–90 FA Cup winners.)

Source: World Football
Rules for classification: 1) Points; 2) Goal difference; 3) Goals scored

Ref:

== Results ==
Queens Park Rangers' score comes first

Win Draw Loss

Date	Opponents	Venue	Result F–A	Scorers	Attendance	Position
19 August 1989	Crystal Palace	H	2–0	Wright (2)	16,161	5
22 August 1989	Chelsea	A	1–1	Clarke 21'	24,354	2
26 August 1989	Norwich City	A	0–0		14,021	8
30 August 1989	Luton Town	H	0–0		10,565	7
9 September 1989	Manchester City	A	0–1		23,420	12
16 September 1989	Derby County	H	0–1		10,697	14
23 September 1989	Aston Villa	A	3–1	Francis 15'. 30', 47'	14,170	9
30 September 1989	Tottenham Hotspur	A	2–3	Bardsley, Francis	23,781	11
14 October 1989	Southampton	H	1–4	Francis	10,022	15
21 October 1989	Charlton Athletic	H	0–1		10,608	17
28 October 1989	Nottingham Forest	A	2–2	Sinton, Wright	9,442	18
4 November 1989	Wimbledon	A	0–0		5,912	19
11 November 1989	Liverpool	H	3–2	Wright 27' pen, 36'Falco 56'	18,804	17
18 November 1989	Arsenal	A	0–3		38,236	18
25 November 1989	Millwall	A	0–0		9,141	18
2 December 1989	Crystal Palace	A	3–0	Maddix, Sinton (2)	12,784	14
9 December 1989	Chelsea	H	4–2	Ferdinand 9', 34', Falco 48', Clarke 80'	17,935	13
16 December 1989	Sheffield Wednesday	A	0–2		14,569	14
26 December 1989	Coventry City	H	1–1	Falco	9,889	14
30 December 1989	Everton	H	1–0	Sinton	11,683	13
1 January 1990	Manchester United	A	0–0		34,824	13
13 January 1990	Norwich City	H	2–1	Falco, Clarke	11,439	13
20 January 1990	Luton Town	A	1–1	Falco	9,703	13
3 February 1990	Aston Villa	H	pp			
10 February 1990	Derby County	A	0–2		14,445	13
17 February 1990	Manchester City	H	pp			
24 February 1990	Millwall	A	2–1	Barker, Wegerle	11,505	13
3 March 1990	Arsenal	H	2–0	Wilkins, Wegerle	18,693	13
10 March 1990	Southampton	A	pp			
17 March 1990	Tottenham Hotspur	H	3–1	Clarke, Sinton, Barker	16,691	12
20 March 1990	Aston Villa	H	1–1	Clarke 50'	15,856	11
24 March 1990	Nottingham Forest	H	2–0	Sinton, Barker	14,653	10
31 March 1990	Charlton Athletic	A	0–1		8,768	12
3 April 1990	Southampton	A	2–0	Maddix, Wegerle	14,757	7
7 April 1990	Everton	A	0–1		19,887	9
11 April 1990	Manchester City	H	1–3	Wegerle 25'	8,437	10
14 April 1990	Manchester United	H	1–2	Channing 33'	19,887	10
16 April 1990	Coventry City	A	1–1	Maddix	10,039	11
21 April 1990	Sheffield Wednesday	H	1–0	Clarke	10,448	9
28 April 1990	Liverpool	A	1–2	Wegerle 14'	37,758	10
5 May 1990	Wimbledon	H	2–3	Wegerle, Channing	9,676	11

=== FA Cup ===
Round	Date	Opponent	Venue	Result F–A	Scorers	Attendance
R3	6 January 1990	Cardiff City (Third Division)	A	0–0		13,834
R3 replay	10 January 1990	Cardiff City (Third Division)	H	2–0	Wilkins, Wegerle	12,226
R4	27 January 1990	Arsenal (First Division)	A	0–0		43,483
R4 replay	31 January 1990	Arsenal (First Division)	H	2–0	Sansom, Sinton	21,547
R5	18 February 1990	Blackpool (Third Division)	A	2–2	Clarke (2)	9,641
R5 replay	21 February 1990	Blackpool (Third Division)	H	0–0 aet		15,323
R5 2nd replay	26 February 1990	Blackpool (Third Division)	H	3–0	Sinton, Sansom, Barker	12,775
R6	11 March 1990	Liverpool (First Division)	H	2–2	Wilkins 29', Barker 83'	21,057
R6 replay	14 March 1990	Liverpool (First Division)	A	0–1		30,090

=== Littlewoods Challenge Cup ===
Round	Date	Opponent	Venue	Result F–A	Attendance	Scorers
R2 1st leg	20 September 1989	Stockport County (Fourth Division)	H	2–1	6,745	Spackman, Clarke
R2 2nd leg	2 October 1989	Stockport County (Fourth Division)	A	0–0 (won 2–1 on agg)	5,997	
R3	25 October 1989	Coventry City (First Division)	H	1–2	9,277	Wright (pen)

=== Friendlies ===
Date	Country	Opponents	Venue	Result F–A	Scorers	Attendance
24-Jul-1989		Bodmin Town	A	2-1	Gray, Wright	2119
26-Jul-1989		Cardiff City	A			
28-Jul-1989		Plymouth Argyle	A			
31-Jul-1989	Scotland	St Mirren	A	2-2	Wright , Spackman	1,600
2-Aug-1989	Scotland	Falkirk	A			
5-Aug-1989	Scotland	Dundee	A			
9-Aug-1989		Brentford	A			
12-Aug-1989		Wolverhampton Wanderers	A			
11-May-1990	Alan Mcdonald Testimonial	Chelsea	H			

== Squad ==
Position	Nationality	Name	League Appearances	League Goals	Cup Appearances	Littlewoods Challenge Cup Goals	F.A.Cup Goals	Total Appearances	Total Goals
GK	ENG	David Seaman	33		12			45	
GK	WAL	Tony Roberts	5					5	
DF	ENG	Robert Herrera	1					1	
DF	ENG	Justin Channing	19	2	3			26	2
DF	WAL	Brian Law	10					10	
DF	NIR	Alan Mcdonald	34	6	12			50	6
DF	ENG	Paul Parker	32		11			43	
DF	ENG	Kenny Sansom	36		12		2	48	2
DF	ENG	David Bardsley	31	1	9			40	1
DF	JAM	Danny Maddix	28	3	10			42	3
MF	ENG	Ray Wilkins	23	1	9		2	32	3
MF	ENG	Simon Barker	24	3	12		2	40	5
MF	ENG	Martin Allen	2					2	
MF	ENG	Peter Reid	15		2			18	
MF	NIR	Colin Clarke	27	6	10	1	2	44	9
MF	ENG	Nigel Spackman	11		2	1		15	1
FW	SCO	Paul Wright	9	5	2	1		19	6
FW	ENG	Les Ferdinand	6	2				9	2
FW	ENG	Andy Sinton	38	6	12		2	50	8
FW	NGA	Dominic Iorfa						1	
FW	USA	Roy Wegerle	18	6	9		1	28	6
FW	ENG	Michael Rutherford	1					3	
FW	ENG	Trevor Francis	3	5	3			7	5
FW	RSA	Mark Stein	1					2	
FW	ENG	Mark Falco	11	5	2			26	5

== Transfers Out ==
Name	from	Date	Fee	Date	Club	Fee
Steve Lynch	Queens Park Rangers Juniors	7 Oct 1987		July 89	Newcastle	Free
David Pizanti	FC Köln (Ger)	Aug1987	£150,000	July 89	Maccabi Netanya (Isr)	Free
Mark Fleming	Queens Park Rangers Juniors	January 1988		July 1989	Brentford	Free
Nigel Spackman	Liverpool	31 Jan 1989	£500,000	Nov 89	Glasgow Rangers	£550,000
Andy Gray	Aston Villa	1 Feb 1989	£450,000	August 1989	Crystal Palace	£500,000
Martin Allen	Queens Park Rangers Juniors	27 May 1983		August 1989	West Ham United	£670,000
Mark Dennis	Southampton	1 May 1987	£50,000	Aug 89	Crystal Palace	£50,000
Mark Stein	Luton Town	25 Aug 1988	£300,000	September 1989	Oxford United	plus £175,000 for David Bardsley
Nicky Johns	Charlton Athletic	20 Dec 1987		October 1989	Maidstone United	
David Kerslake	Queens Park Rangers Juniors	June 1983		November 1989	Swindon Town	£110,000
Peter Reid	Everton	8 Feb 1989	Free	December 1989	Manchester City	Free
Trevor Francis	Glasgow Rangers	24 Mar 1988	Free	February 1990	Sheffield W	Free
Paul Wright	Aberdeen	16 July 1989	£250,000	March 1990	Hibernian	£300,000
David Seaman	Birmingham City	6 Aug 1986	£225,000	May 1990	Arsenal	£1,300,000
Colin Clarke	Southampton	9 Mar 1989	£800,000	June 1990	Portsmouth	£450,000
Greg Costello	Queens Park Rangers Juniors	10 Mar 1988		June 90	Swindon	Free
Kevin Kingsmore	Queens Park Rangers Juniors	1 Jan 1989		June 90		Free

== Transfers In ==
Name	from	Date	Fee
Paul Wright	Aberdeen	16 July 1989	£250,000
David Bardsley	Oxford United	14 Sep 1989	Mark Stein plus £175,000
Ray Wilkins	Glasgow Rangers	28 Nov 1989	Free
Roy Wegerle	Luton Town	11 Dec 1989	£1,000,000
Michael Rutherford	Queens Park Rangers Juniors	December 1989	
Alan McCarthy	Queens Park Rangers Juniors	8 Dec 1989	
Michael Rutherford	Queens Park Rangers Juniors	December 1989	
David Macchiochi	Queens Park Rangers Juniors	December 1989	
Kevin Kingsmore	Queens Park Rangers Juniors	1 Jan 1989	
Bradley Allen	Queens Park Rangers Juniors	Jan1989	
Michael Meaker	Queens Park Rangers Juniors	7 Feb 1990	
Dominic Iorfa	Royal Antwerp	March 1990	£145,000
Peter Caldwell	Queens Park Rangers Juniors	13 Mar 1990	
Tony Joyce	Queens Park Rangers Juniors	13 Mar 1990	
Paul Vowles	Queens Park Rangers Juniors	13 Mar 1990	
Steve Crocker	Queens Park Rangers Juniors	13 Mar 1990	
Andrew Impey	Yeading	June 1990	£20,000
