= Devon White =

Devon White may refer to:

- Devon White (baseball) (born 1962), baseball player
- Devon White (footballer) (born 1964), association football player
- Devon White (The Office), fictional character from US TV series The Office

== See also ==
- Devin White (born 1998), American football player
