= 1988–89 Queens Park Rangers F.C. season =

English football club season

Queens Park Rangers
1988–89 season
- Chairman: David Bulstrode, (From September 1988), Robert Noonan, David Thompson, Richard Thompson
- Manager: Jim Smith resigns Dec 6th, Trevor Francis player-manager from Dec 14th
- Stadium: Loftus Road
- First Division: 9th
- FA Cup: Third round
- League Cup: Fifth round
- Top goalscorer: League: Mark Falco (12); All: Falco (15)
- Highest home attendance: 22,236 (v Manchester United, 11 January 1989)
- Lowest home attendance: 6,078 (v Cardiff City, 28 September 1988)
- Average home league attendance: 16,091
- Biggest win: 4-1 Vs Cardiff City (12 October 1988), Southampton (31 December 1988)
- Biggest defeat: 2-5 Vs Nottingham Forest (18 January 1989)
Home colours	Away colours

During the 1988–89 English football season, Queens Park Rangers competed in the First Division for the sixth year running.

== Season summary ==
QPR dropped from their fifth-place finish the previous season to ninth in the First Division. Jim Smith resigned as their manager in December 1988, to take over as manager of Newcastle United, and was replaced by the former England international Trevor Francis as player-manager. The team's league form improved in the new year, and they lost just two of their last fifteen league matches. They reached the fifth round of the League Cup but were knocked out of the FA Cup in the third round.

== Kit ==
Adidas continued as QPR's kit manufacturers. Airline KLM remained front of shirt kit sponsors.

== Omniturf ==
The artificial pitch of Omniturf that was installed at Loftus Road was removed in April 1988 prior to the season starting. Souvenir swatches of the pitch were later sold at the club's retail store.

== League table ==
Pos	Team	Pld	W	D	L	GF	GA	GD	Pts
7	Coventry City	38	14	13	11	47	42	+5	55
8	Everton	38	14	12	12	50	45	+5	54
9	Queens Park Rangers	38	14	11	13	43	37	+6	53
10	Millwall	38	14	11	13	47	52	−5	53
11	Manchester United	38	13	12	13	45	35	+10	51

Source: World Football
Rules for classification: 1) Points; 2) Goal difference; 3) Goals scored

== Results ==
Queens Park Rangers' score comes first

Win Draw Loss

=== Football League First Division ===
Date	Opponents	Venue	Result F–A	Scorers	Attendance	Position
27 August 1988	Manchester United	A	0–0		46,377	11
3 September 1988	Southampton	H	0–1		9,454	15
10 September 1988	Norwich City	A	0–1		11,174	17
17 September 1988	Sheffield Wednesday	H	2–0	Francis (2; 1 pen)	8,011	11
24 September 1988	Derby County	A	1–0	Stein	14,008	11
1 October 1988	Millwall	A	2–3	Francis, M. Allen	14,103	12
8 October 1988	Nottingham Forest	H	1–2	Stein	11,295	17
15 October 1988	West Ham United	H	2–1	Stein, Maddix	14,566	9
22 October 1988	Arsenal	A	1–2	Falco	33,202	12
29 October 1988	Luton Town	A	0–0		8,453	15
5 November 1988	Newcastle United	H	3–0	Maddix, M. Allen, Falco	11,013	12
12 November 1988	Middlesbrough	A	0–1		20,565	14
19 November 1988	Liverpool	H	0–1		20,065	14
26 November 1988	Tottenham Hotspur	A	2–2	Falco, Francis	26,698	13
3 December 1988	Coventry City	H	2–1	Francis, Falco	9,853	13
10 December 1988	Charlton Athletic	A	1–1	Francis	6,012	13
17 December 1988	Everton	H	0–0		10,067	14
26 December 1988	Aston Villa	A	1–2	Francis 73'	25,106	15
31 December 1988	Southampton	A	4–1	M. Allen, Barker, Falco (2)	15,086	12
2 January 1989	Norwich City	H	1–1	Falco	12,461	14
14 January 1989	Wimbledon	A	0–1		7,118	15
21 January 1989	Derby County	H	0–1		9,516	16
4 February 1989	Millwall	H	1–2	Falco (pen)	10,881	16
11 February 1989	Nottingham Forest	A	0–0		19,692	16
18 February 1989	Arsenal	H	0–0		20,543	16
25 February 1989	West Ham United	A	0–0		17,371	16
4 March 1989	Luton Town	H	pp			
11 March 1989	Newcastle United	A	2–1	Stein, Clarke	21,555	14
18 March 1989	Manchester United	H	pp			
21 March 1989	Luton Town	H	1–1	Clarke	9,072	12
25 March 1989	Sheffield Wednesday	A	2–0	Falco, M. Allen	18,804	12
27 March 1989	Aston Villa	H	1–0	Sinton 70'	11,378	12
1 April 1989	Everton	A	1–4	Falco (pen)	23,028	12
8 April 1989	Wimbledon	H	4–3	Clarke, Spackman, Falco, Reid	9,569	12
15 April 1989	Middlesbrough	H	0–0		10,347	12
22 April 1989	Coventry City	A	3–0	Clarke (2), Channing	11,319	11
29 April 1989	Charlton Athletic	H	1–0	Sinton	13,452	10
6 May 1989	Liverpool	A	pp			
8 May 1989	Manchester United	H	3–2	Sinton 21', Gray 60', 90'	10,017	9
13 May 1989	Tottenham Hotspur	H	1–0	Falco	21,873	8
16 May 1989	Liverpool	A	0–2		38,368	9

=== FA Cup ===
Round	Date	Opponent	Venue	Result F–A	Attendance	Scorers
R3	7 January 1989	Manchester United (First Division)	A	0–0	36,222	
R3 replay	11 January 1989	Manchester United (First Division)	H	2–2 aet	22,236	Stein, McDonald
R3 2nd replay	23 January 1989	Manchester United (First Division)	A	0–3	47,257	

=== Littlewoods Challenge Cup ===
Round	Date	Opponent	Venue	Result F–A	Attendance	Scorers
R2 1st leg	28 September 1988	Cardiff City (Third Division)	H	3–0	6,078	Francis 12', Fereday 26', Allen 90'
R2 2nd leg	12 October 1988	Cardiff City (Third Division)	A	4–1 (won 7–1 on agg)	2,692	Stein 10', Falco (2) 56' 81', Maddix 59'
R3	2 November 1988	Charlton Athletic (First Division)	H	2–1	8,701	Francis (2)
R4	30 November 1988	Wimbledon (First Division)	H	0–0	10,504	
R4 replay	14 December 1988	Wimbledon (First Division)	A	1–0	6,585	Falco
R5	18 January 1989	Nottingham Forest (First Division)	A	2–5	24,065	Stein 22', Kerslake 79'

=== Mercantile Credit Centenary Trophy ===
Round	Date	Opponent	Venue	Result F–A	Scorers	Attendance
QF	31 August 1988	Arsenal	H	0-2		10,019

=== Simod Cup ===
Round	Date	Opponent	Venue	Result F–A	Scorers	Attendance
Simod Cup 3rd Rd	1-Feb-1989	Sheffield Wednesday	A			
Simod Cup 4th Rd	14-Feb-1989	Watford	A			
Simod Cup SF	28-Feb-1989	Everton	A			

=== Friendlies ===
Date	Country	Opponents	Venue	Result F–A	Scorers	Attendance
25-Jul-1988	Sweden	Nässjö FF	A			
27-Jul-1988	Sweden	Falkenbergs FF	A			
28-Jul-1988	Sweden	Örgryte IS	A			
31-Jul-1988	Sweden	Rydöbruks IF	A			
2-Aug-1988	Denmark	Aarhus	A			
10-Aug-1988		Weymouth	A			
13-Aug-1988		AFC Bournemouth	A			
16-Aug-1988		Yeovil Town	A			
19-Aug-1988		Aldershot	A			
21-Aug-1988		Al-Ahly	H	1-1	McDonald 16',	3,471
3-May-1989	Trinidad	Trinidad	A			
5-May-1989	Trinidad	Trinidad	A			

=== Football Combination ===
Date	Opponents	Venue	Score (F–A)
30 August 1988	Portsmouth	A	1-3
3 September 1988	Tottenham	A	0–2
14 September 1988	Chelsea	A	0–4
24 September 1988	Reading	A	0-1
4 October 1988	Southampton	A	1-2
12 October 1988	Norwich	A	2-4
18 October 1988	Watford	A	0-0
25 October 1988	Norwich	H	1-0
2 November 1988	West Ham	H	0-1
5 November 1988	Arsenal	A	1-2
9 November 1988	Luton Town	H	0-1
16 November 1988	Brighton	H	3-1
26 November 1988	Luton Town	A	2-0
6 December 1988	Fulham	H	2-2
8 December 1988	Oxford United	A	0-2
13 December 1988	Ipswich	A	2-3
20 December 1988	Fulham	A	1-3
4 January 1989	Crystal Palace	A	0-0
10 January 1989	Millwall	A	0-3
17 January 1989	Oxford United	H	4-3
31 January 1989	Portsmouth		PP
7 February 1989	Tottenham	H	0-1
14 February 1989	Chelsea	H	0-4
28 February 1989	Reading	H	1-2
7 March 1989	Southampton	A	1-5
14 March 1989	Charlton	A	2-2
21 March 1989	Swindon	H	
23 March 1989	Millwall	H	
29 March 1989	Watford	H	
1 April 1989	West Ham	A	
4 April 1989	Crystal Palace	H	
11 April 1989	Arsenal	H	
19 April 1989	Brighton	A	
25 April 1989	Charlton	H	
2 May 1989	Wimbledon	H	
9 May 1989	Ipswich	H	
16 May 1989	Swindon	A	

== Squad ==
Position	Nationality	Name	League Appearances	League Goals	Cup Appearances	Littlewoods Challenge Cup Goals	F.A.Cup Goals	Total Appearances	Total Goals
GK	ENG	David Seaman	35		11			46	
GK	ENG	Nicky Johns	3		2			5	
DF	ENG	Roberto Herrera			1			5	
DF	ENG	Justin Channing	9	1	4			13	1
DF	WAL	Brian Law	6		4			10	
DF	NIR	Alan Mcdonald	27		10		1	41	1
DF	ENG	Paul Parker	36		12			48	
DF	ENG	Mark Fleming	1					3	
DF	WAL	Alan McCarthy			1			1	
DF	ENG	Gavin Maguire	7		1			11	
DF	JAM	Danny Maddix	28	2	10	1		46	3
DF	ISR	David Pizanti	13		8			24	
DF	ENG	Mark Dennis	16		5			22	
MF	ARG	Osvaldo Ardiles	4		3			12	
MF	ENG	David Kerslake	11		7	1		30	1
MF	ENG	Simon Barker	21	1	9			36	1
MF	ENG	Martin Allen	26	4	6	1		34	5
MF	ENG	Peter Reid	14	1				14	1
MF	NIR	Colin Clarke	12	3				12	5
MF	ENG	Nigel Spackman	16		2			18	1
MF	ENG	Kevin Brock	12		5			19	
FW	ENG	Andy Gray	11	2				11	2
FW	ENG	Dean Coney	11		9			25	
FW	ENG	Wayne Fereday	29		10	1		41	1
FW	ENG	Andy Sinton	10	3				10	3
FW	ENG	Bradley Allen						3	
FW	ENG	Trevor Francis	19	7	7	3		26	10
FW	RSA	Mark Stein	19	4	9	2	1	41	7
FW	ENG	Mark Falco	22	12	7	3		34	15

== Transfers Out ==
Name	from	Date	Fee	Date	Club	Fee
Warren Neill	Queens Park Rangers Juniors	Sep 3,1980		July 1988	Portsmouth	£110,000
John Byrne	York	Oct 16,1984	£100,000	July 88	Le Havre (Fra)	£175,000
Dean Neal	Southend	June 13, 1988	Loan	July 88	Southend	Loan
Les Ferdinand	Hayes	March 1987	£50,000	August 1988	Besiktas	Loan
Ian Dawes	Queens Park Rangers Juniors	Dec 24,1980		August 1988	Millwall	£150,000
Kevin Brock	Oxford United	Aug 12,1987	£260,000	December 1988	Newcastle United	£300,000
Gavin Maguire	Queens Park Rangers Juniors	October 1985		January 1989	Portsmouth	£175,000
Osvaldo Ardiles	Tottenham Hotspur	Aug 25,1988		February 1989	Fort Lauderdale Strikers	
Dean Coney	Fulham	June 18, 1987	£200,000	Mar 89	Norwich	£350,000
Wayne Fereday	Queens Park Rangers Juniors	Aug 28,1980		June 1989	Newcastle United	£425,000
Gary Eaton	Queens Park Rangers Juniors	July1988		June 89		Free

== Transfers In ==
Name	from	Date	Fee
Simon Barker	Blackburn Rovers	July 20, 1988	£400,000
Gary Eaton	Queens Park Rangers Juniors	July1988	
Osvaldo Ardiles	Tottenham Hotspur	Aug 25,1988	Free
Mark Stein	Luton	Aug 25,1988	£300,000
Bradley Allen	Queens Park Rangers Juniors	Sep 30,1988	
Alan McCarthy	Queens Park Rangers Juniors	December 1988	
Nigel Spackman	Liverpool	Jan 31,1989	£500,000
Kevin Kingsmore	Queens Park Rangers Juniors	Jan 1,1989	
Andy Gray	Aston Villa	Feb 1,1989	£450,000
Peter Reid	Everton	Feb 8,1989	Free
Colin Clarke	Southampton	Mar 9,1989	£800,000
Andy Sinton	Brentford	Mar 23,1989	£350,000
Maurice Doyle	Crewe Alexandra	Apr 21,1989	£80,000
Kenny Sansom	Newcastle United	June 1989	£300,000
