= Simon Barker =

English footballer (born 1964)

Personal information
- Full name: Simon Barker
- Date of birth: 4 November 1964 (age 61)
- Place of birth: Farnworth, England
- Height: 5 ft 8 in (1.73 m)
- Position: Midfielder

Youth career
- 1978–1983: Blackburn Rovers

Senior career*
Years	Team	Apps	(Gls)
1983–1988	Blackburn Rovers	182	(35)
1988–1998	Queens Park Rangers	315	(33)
1998–1999	Port Vale	32	(2)
Total		529	(70)

International career
1985–1986	England U21	4	(0)
- * Club domestic league appearances and goals

Simon Barker (born 4 November 1964) is an English former professional footballer who played as a midfielder.

He began his career at Blackburn Rovers in 1983, winning the Full Members' Cup with the club in 1987, before moving on to Queens Park Rangers the following year for £400,000. He played 351 league and cup games for QPR and played in the Premier League before moving on to Port Vale in 1998. He scored 84 goals in 619 league and cup appearances throughout a 16-year career in the English Football League. He also represented England under-21s four times. He retired in November 1999 and went on to work for the Professional Footballers' Association as assistant chief executive.

== Career ==
=== Blackburn Rovers ===
Barker began his career at Blackburn Rovers under Bobby Saxton's stewardship in 1983, having been Noel Brotherston's boot boy as an apprentice. He had chosen to join Rovers ahead of Manchester United as he felt he had a better chance of breaking into the first-team at Ewood Park. Rovers finished sixth in the Second Division in 1983–84, three places and 13 points outside of the promotion zone. They moved up to fifth in 1984–85, just two places and one point behind promoted Manchester City. Blackburn then dropped down to 19th in 1985–86, just one place and three points above relegated Carlisle United; Barker was voted the club's Player of the Year at the end of the campaign. New manager Don Mackay then rallied them to a 12th-place finish in 1986–87. Barker played for Rovers in the 1987 Full Members Cup final at Wembley, where Colin Hendry's goal was enough to beat Charlton Athletic 1–0. Blackburn reached the play-offs in 1987–88, but were defeated at the semi-final stage by top-flight Chelsea.

=== Queens Park Rangers ===
He joined First Division club Queens Park Rangers in 1988 for a fee of £400,000, a club record for both Blackburn and QPR. He made his debut in a 0–0 draw against Manchester United in September of that year. Rangers finished ninth in 1988–89 under Trevor Francis, eleventh in 1989–90 and twelfth in 1990–91 under Don Howe, and eleventh again in 1991–92 under Gerry Francis. Barker helped Rangers post a fifth-place finish in the first-ever season of Premier League football in 1992–93, a feat which made them the top club in London. They dropped to ninth in 1993–94, before finishing eighth in 1994–95 under new manager Ray Wilkins. However, the sale of top-scorer Les Ferdinand to Newcastle United hit QPR hard, and they were relegated in 1995–96, though Barker did find the net against West London rivals Chelsea. New boss Stewart Houston failed to bring immediate promotion back to the top flight, as they finished five points outside the play-offs. The club struggled in 1997–98, finishing just one point and one place above relegated Manchester City. After a testimonial match against Jamaica, Barker left Loftus Road for Port Vale. Barker made 351 appearances for QPR in all competitions, scoring 41 goals.

=== Port Vale ===
Barker scored on his return to Loftus Road on 5 December 1998. However, the "Valiants" lost the game 3–2. He played a total of 25 games in 1998–99, as the club went through a turbulent period by replacing manager John Rudge with Brian Horton. Barker featured just six times at Vale Park in the 1999–2000 campaign and retired at the end of his contract in November after picking up an injury.

== PFA work ==
Barker applied unsuccessfully for management jobs and instead began working full-time for the Professional Footballers' Association (PFA) in 1999 after spending five years on the management committee. He went on to become a senior executive for the PFA.

== Career statistics ==
Appearances and goals by club, season and competition
Club	Season	League			FA Cup		Other		Total	
Club	Season	Division	Apps	Goals	Apps	Goals	Apps	Goals	Apps	Goals
Blackburn Rovers	1983–84	Second Division	28	3	2	0	0	0	30	3
Blackburn Rovers	1984–85	Second Division	38	2	4	0	2	0	44	2
Blackburn Rovers	1985–86	Second Division	41	10	3	0	1	0	45	10
Blackburn Rovers	1986–87	Second Division	42	11	1	0	10	6	53	17
Blackburn Rovers	1987–88	Second Division	33	9	1	0	4	0	38	9
Blackburn Rovers	Total		182	35	11	0	17	6	210	41
Queens Park Rangers	1988–89	First Division	25	1	3	0	8	0	36	1
Queens Park Rangers	1989–90	First Division	28	3	9	2	3	0	40	5
Queens Park Rangers	1990–91	First Division	35	1	1	0	5	1	41	2
Queens Park Rangers	1991–92	First Division	34	6	1	0	6	2	41	8
Queens Park Rangers	1992–93	Premier League	25	1	2	0	1	0	28	1
Queens Park Rangers	1993–94	Premier League	37	5	1	1	4	2	42	8
Queens Park Rangers	1994–95	Premier League	37	4	4	0	3	0	44	4
Queens Park Rangers	1995–96	Premier League	33	5	0	0	4	0	37	5
Queens Park Rangers	1996–97	First Division	38	4	2	0	2	0	42	4
Queens Park Rangers	1997–98	First Division	23	3	0	0	2	0	25	3
Queens Park Rangers	Total		315	33	23	3	38	5	376	41
Port Vale	1998–99	First Division	27	2	0	0	0	0	27	2
Port Vale	1999–2000	First Division	5	0	0	0	1	0	6	0
Port Vale	Total		32	2	0	0	1	0	33	2
Career total			529	70	34	3	56	11	619	84

== Honours ==
Blackburn Rovers

- Full Members' Cup: 1986–87

Individual

- Blackburn Rovers Player of the Year: 1985–86
