= Gus Wilson =

English footballer and coach

Personal information
- Full name: Eugene Wilson
- Date of birth: 11 April 1963 (age 63)
- Place of birth: Manchester, United Kingdom
- Height: 5 ft 11 in (1.80 m)
- Position: Defender

Youth career
- 1980–1984: Manchester City

Senior career*
Years	Team	Apps	(Gls)
1987–1991	Accrington Stanley		
1991–1994	Crewe Alexandra	81	(0)
1994–2001	Hyde Utd	212	(0)
2001–2003	Radcliffe Borough	61	(0)
- * Club domestic league appearances and goals

Eugene "Gus" Wilson (born 11 April 1963) is an English former professional football player and is now a football coach with extensive experience in the non-league game across north-west England.

Wilson started as a trainee at Manchester City like his older brother Clive Wilson.

In 1991, he joined Crewe Alexandra from Accrington Stanley, making a total of 115 appearances as a right-sided defender for the Railwaymen. His one League goal - in an away win at Aldershot on New Year's Day 1992 - was later wiped from the records when Aldershot went bust. He did however manage to score 3 other goals in Cup matches.

Wilson joined Hyde United F.C. in 1994, and in 2001 he moved to Radcliffe Borough.

After his playing career was over, Wilson moved into team management and coaching at various north-western clubs including Flixton, Winsford United, Glossop North End and F.C. United of Manchester.
