= Dennis Bailey (footballer, born 1965) =

English footballer

Personal information
- Full name: Dennis Lincoln Bailey
- Date of birth: 13 December 1965 (age 60)
- Place of birth: Lambeth, London, England
- Position: Striker

Youth career
- 1982–1984: Watford
- 1985–1986: Barking

Senior career*
Years	Team	Apps	(Gls)
1986–1987	Fulham	0	(0)
1987	Farnborough Town	16	(3)
1987–1989	Crystal Palace	5	(1)
1989	→ Bristol Rovers (loan)	17	(9)
1989–1991	Birmingham City	75	(23)
1991	→ Bristol Rovers (loan)	6	(1)
1991–1995	Queens Park Rangers	40	(10)
1993–1994	→ Charlton Athletic (loan)	4	(0)
1994	→ Watford (loan)	8	(4)
1995	→ Brentford (loan)	6	(3)
1995–1998	Gillingham	88	(11)
1998	Lincoln City	5	(0)
1998–1999	Farnborough Town	30	(13)
1999	Cheltenham Town	8	(2)
1999–2001	Forest Green Rovers	60	(9)
2001	Aberystwyth Town		
2001–2002	Tamworth	7	(2)
2002–2003	Stafford Rangers	30	(12)
2003–2004	Moor Green	24	(3)
2004–2006	Stratford Town		
- * Club domestic league appearances and goals

Dennis Lincoln Bailey (born 13 December 1965) is an English former professional footballer. He is best remembered for being the last player before Mo Salah to score a league hat-trick against Manchester United at Old Trafford.

Bailey started his career at Watford playing in their youth and reserve sides between 1982 and 1984. He subsequently joined Barking, before joining Fulham on non-contract terms in November 1986. He signed for Farnborough Town in February 1987, before returning to league football in December 1987 with Crystal Palace, joining for a fee of £10,000. He was loaned to Bristol Rovers in February 1989, before joining Birmingham City in August of the same year. He was loaned to Bristol Rovers again in March 1991, but returned from his loan to feature as a substitute when Birmingham beat Tranmere Rovers to win the 1991 Associate Members' Cup Final.

Bailey signed for Queens Park Rangers for £175,000 in July 1991. He made his debut on the opening day of the 1991–92 season against Arsenal, scoring in a 1–1 draw.

On 1 January 1992 he scored a hat-trick in a 4–1 win away at league leaders Manchester United; one of the last league games to be broadcast live by ITV. He was the last player to achieve the feat in the league at Old Trafford until Mohamed Salah did the same in October 2021. The only other player to do so after Bailey was Real Madrid's Ronaldo in the 2002–03 UEFA Champions League.

In total Bailey played 39 league games for QPR, scoring 10 goals. He was soon frozen out of the first team by the likes of Gary Penrice and Bradley Allen, and in October 1993 he was loaned to Charlton Athletic and later that season to Watford. While with Watford he scored in three successive games after coming off the substitutes bench, greatly helping the club's escape from the relegation zone.

Bailey was loaned to Brentford in January 1995, before signing for Gillingham in August of the same year for £50.000, helping them win promotion from Division Three that season. He subsequently played for Lincoln City, before moving into non-league football for a second spell with Farnborough Town. He then moved on to play for Cheltenham Town, Forest Green Rovers, League of Wales side Aberystwyth Town, Tamworth, Stafford Rangers, Moor Green and Stratford Town. He retired as a player in November 2006.

He then went on to do coaching, often helping coach a Saturday morning football group in Monkspath in the West Midlands. In 2011, Bailey was coaching and playing for his local church team, Renewal Christian Centre in Solihull, in the West Midlands Christian Football League. He has then continued to work in schools teaching Physical Education. Now working at Myton School

== Honours ==
Birmingham City

- Associate Members' Cup: 1990–91
