= Darren Peacock =

English footballer (born 1968)

Personal information
- Date of birth: 3 February 1968 (age 58)
- Place of birth: Bristol, England
- Height: 6 ft 2 in (1.88 m)
- Position: Centre-back

Youth career
- 1984–1986: Bristol City

Senior career*
Years	Team	Apps	(Gls)
1986–1989	Newport County	28	(0)
1989–1990	Hereford United	59	(4)
1990–1994	Queens Park Rangers	126	(6)
1994–1998	Newcastle United	133	(2)
1998–2000	Blackburn Rovers	47	(1)
2000	→ West Ham United (loan)	0	(0)
2000	→ Wolverhampton Wanderers (loan)	4	(0)
Total		397	(13)

Managerial career
- 2013–2015: Lancaster City
- * Club domestic league appearances and goals

Darren Peacock (born 3 February 1968) is an English football manager and former professional footballer.

As a player, he was a centre-back who made nearly 400 league appearances. He notably played in the Premier League for Queens Park Rangers, Newcastle United, Blackburn Rovers and West Ham United, although he failed to make an appearance for the latter. He also played in the Football League with Hereford United and Wolverhampton Wanderers and prior to his professional career had played at non-league level for Newport County.

From 2013 to 2015, he was the manager of Northern Premier League Division One North club Lancaster City.

== Playing career ==
After being released by Bristol City, Peacock started his career in the lower leagues at Newport County, and when the club folded in 1989 he signed for Hereford United. In his first full season with the Bulls, he was voted player of the year, featuring regularly in the team that won the Welsh Cup in 1990.

Peacock's performances with Hereford earned him a move to First Division club Queens Park Rangers in 1990 for £200,000. He was a member of the QPR team that beat Manchester United 4–1 at Old Trafford in front of a live television audience on New Year's Day 1992.

After having made over 100 league appearances for QPR, Peacock was purchased by Kevin Keegan of Newcastle United on 24 March 1994, for £2.7 million, to strengthen their defence in their first season in the Premier League. A sell-on clause meant that Hereford received a total fee of £440,000 for the player, which remains, as of February 2010, their record transfer fee received. He helped the Magpies to a third-place finish, which earned the club qualification for the UEFA Cup.

Newcastle won their first six league games in the 1994–95 season, and there was talk of a first top-flight title since 1927, but they lost form and finished in sixth position, out of the European qualification zone. The following season, Peacock was part of the team that lost the Premier League title to Manchester United after having a 10-point lead at Christmas. He scored only twice for the Magpies, one of those coming in a 5–0 home defeat of Manchester United on 20 October 1996. This was Keegan's final season as club manager, and his replacement, Kenny Dalglish, gradually broke up his predecessor's team.

Peacock made 176 appearances for Newcastle in all competitions, scoring 4 goals, and moved on to Blackburn Rovers in 1998, where his serious injury problems began. He scored one goal for Rovers, against Southampton in April 1999, but soon lost his place in the team and served loan spells at West Ham United and Wolverhampton Wanderers.

While on loan at Wolves, Peacock collided with his own goalkeeper, Michael Oakes, in a match against Fulham, suffering damaged vertebrae in his neck and compression to his spine. He played on in the match despite being knocked unconscious, and it was only on his return to Blackburn that it became clear how close he had come to paralysis. He retired from football in December 2000.

== Managerial career ==
In April 2013, it was announced that Peacock had been appointed as manager of Northern Premier League Division One North league club Lancaster City

== Honours ==
Individual

- Newcastle United Player of the Year: 1995–96
