= Devon White (footballer) =

English footballer (born 1964)

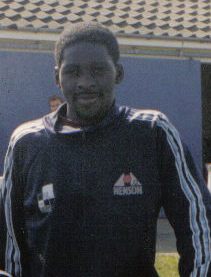

Personal information
- Full name: Devon White
- Date of birth: 2 March 1964 (age 62)
- Place of birth: Nottingham, England
- Height: 6 ft 3 in (1.91 m)
- Position: Striker

Senior career*
Years	Team	Apps	(Gls)
1983–1984	Arnold Kingswell		
1984–1986	Lincoln City	29	(4)
1985–1986	→ Boston United (loan)	7	(2)
1985–1986	→ Naxxar Lions (loan)	1	(3)
1986–1987	Boston United	12	(2)
1986–1987	Shepshed Charterhouse		
1987–1988	Grantham	0	(0)
1987–1992	Bristol Rovers	202	(53)
1992–1993	Cambridge United	22	(4)
1993–1994	Queens Park Rangers	26	(9)
1994–1996	Notts County	44	(16)
1996–1997	Watford	38	(7)
1997	Notts County	15	(2)
1997–1999	Shrewsbury Town	45	(10)
1999–?	Ilkeston Town		
- * Club domestic league appearances and goals

Devon White (born 2 March 1964) is an English football coach and former professional footballer.

He played as a striker most notably spending a spell in the Premier League for Queens Park Rangers as well as representing six different Football League clubs, Lincoln City, Bristol Rovers, Cambridge United, Notts County, Watford and Shrewsbury Town. He also had a spell in Malta with Naxxar Lions and featured in Non-league football for Arnold Kingswell, Boston United, Shepshed Charterhouse, Grantham and Ilkeston Town.

== Playing career ==
White began his career in the non-league ranks whilst training as an electrician. In 1984 his talents were spotted by Lincoln City and he moved into the professional game. He spent two seasons with Lincoln, from where he was loaned to Maltese club Naxxar Lions, before dropping back into the non-league ranks with first Boston United and then Shepshed Charterhouse. At the beginning of the 1987–1988 season he appeared in a Lincolnshire Senior Cup tie for Grantham before surprisingly rejoining the pro ranks at Bristol Rovers. He also had a short stint at non league Oxhey jets, scoring one goal in five matches.

The move occurred following the appointment of Gerry Francis as manager at Bristol Rovers. Francis was looking for a strong physical striker and remembered a performance White had given for Lincoln against Rovers and contacted Lincoln to enquire about signing White. He was somewhat surprised to discover White had drifted back into non-league football and it took some detective work to track him down. He grasped his second chance at the professional game and went on to enjoy a long career.

== Coaching career ==
In December 2006, he returned to non-league football circuit as temporary first-team coach at Gedling Town, a role he occupied until the completion of the 2006–07 season.

== Personal life ==
At the culmination of his professional career, White returned to his initial trade as an electrician and now runs his own company in Nottingham.

In 2011, he was the victim of an impostor who posted comments on Facebook containing racist remarks, as well as references to drug use and serious sexual offences while claiming to be White. White reported the matter to the police and to Facebook.

== Honours ==
Bristol Rovers

- Football League Third Division: 1989–90
- Associate Members' Cup runner-up: 1989–90
