= Jan Stejskal =

Czech footballer (born 1962)

Personal information
- Date of birth: 15 January 1962 (age 64)
- Place of birth: Brno, Czechoslovakia
- Height: 1.94 m (6 ft 4 in)
- Position: Goalkeeper

Youth career
- 1972–1981: Zbrojovka Brno

Senior career*
Years	Team	Apps	(Gls)
1982–1983	RH Cheb	22	(0)
1983–1990	Sparta Prague	190	(0)
1990–1994	Queens Park Rangers	107	(0)
1994–1999	Slavia Prague	104	(0)
1999	→ Viktoria Žižkov (loan)	4	(0)
Total		427	(0)

International career
1986–1992	Czechoslovakia	29	(0)
1990	Czechoslovakia B	1	(0)
1994	Czech Republic	2	(0)

Managerial career
- 1999–2011: Sparta Prague (goalkeeping coach)
- 2012–2015: Jablonec (goalkeeping coach)
Medal record
SK Slavia Prague
Winner	Gambrinus liga	1995–96
- * Club domestic league appearances and goals

Jan Stejskal (born 15 January 1962) is a former Czech footballer and goalkeeper coach. In a 17-year playing career as a goalkeeper, he set a Czechoslovak First League record for clean sheets in a season, and spent four years in England at Queens Park Rangers. Stejskal played for Czechoslovakia and later the Czech Republic, for both he played a total of 31 matches, participating in the 1990 FIFA World Cup. He also has served of mayor of Jevany since 2023.

== Playing career ==
Stejskal played in the Czechoslovak First League for RH Cheb in the 1982–83 season, before moving to Sparta Prague, where he equalled the league record of 19 clean sheets in the 1986–87 season. During his time with Sparta the club won the Czechoslovak League title back to back in 1983–84 and 1984–85, before securing three in a row (1986–87, 1987–88 and 1988–89). In the same period he was part of the winning team for the Czechoslovak Cup (in 1983–84, 1987–88 and 1988–89).

Stejskal later moved to England, where he had a successful spell at Queens Park Rangers from 1990 to 1994. He was one of only 13 foreign players to play on the opening weekend of the FA Premier League along with Peter Schmeichel, Andrei Kanchelskis, Robert Warzycha, Roland Nilsson, Eric Cantona, Hans Segers, John Faxe Jensen, Anders Limpar, Gunnar Halle, Craig Forrest, Michel Vonk and Ronnie Rosenthal. After returning to the Czech Republic, Stejskal played for Slavia Prague, where he won the Czech First League in the 1995–96 season, as well as the Czech Cup in 1996–97, and Viktoria Žižkov, where he played four games before sustaining an ankle injury. He retired in 1999 at the age of 37.

At international level, Stejskal made 31 appearances for his country and played at the 1990 FIFA World Cup. Following the Dissolution of Czechoslovakia, he played twice for the newly-formed Czech Republic national football team in 1994.

== Coaching career ==
Stejskal worked as a goalkeeping coach for the Czech Republic national football team until his departure in 2009. He was also appointed to the same position in Sparta Prague in 2011, but left later that December and replaced by former national team goalkeeper Pavel Srníček. Stejskal became goalkeeping coach for the Czech Republic again, this time at UEFA Euro 2012. He joined FK Jablonec as a goalkeeping coach later that same year.

== Personal life ==
Stejskal has two granddaughters. He is also a qualified mechanic, a trade learned whilst serving on national duty for the former Czechoslovakia.

== Honours ==
Sparta Prague

- Czechoslovak First League: 1983–84, 1984–85, 1986–87, 1987–88, 1988–89
- Czechoslovak Cup: 1983–84, 1987–88, 1988–89

Slavia Prague

- Czech First League: 1995–96
- Czech Cup: 1996–97
