= Andy Impey =

English footballer

Personal information
- Full name: Andrew Rodney Impey
- Date of birth: 30 September 1971 (age 55)
- Place of birth: Hammersmith, London, England
- Height: 5 ft 8 in (1.73 m)
- Positions: Full back; winger

Team information
- Current team: Queens Park Rangers (Academy Coach)

Youth career
- 1989–1990: Yeading

Senior career*
Years	Team	Apps	(Gls)
1990–1997	Queens Park Rangers	188	(13)
1997–1998	West Ham United	26	(0)
1998–2004	Leicester City	152	(2)
2004	→ Nottingham Forest (loan)	16	(1)
2004–2005	Nottingham Forest	21	(0)
2005	→ Millwall (loan)	5	(0)
2005–2006	Coventry City	16	(0)
Total		424	(16)

International career
1992	England U21	1	(0)
- * Club domestic league appearances and goals

Andrew Rodney Impey (born 30 September 1971) is an English football coach and former professional footballer who is an academy coach at Queens Park Rangers.

As a player, he was a full-back or winger who notably played in the Premier League for Queens Park Rangers, West Ham United and Leicester City. He also played in the Football League for Nottingham Forest, Millwall and Coventry City. He was capped once at England U21 level.

Since 2015, he was worked back at Queens Park Rangers and has worked as an academy coach, currently with the clubs under-23 setup.

== Club career ==
Impey signed for Queens Park Rangers in 1990 and made his debut against Norwich in October 1991. For six years he played either in defence or on the wing, alongside players such as Les Ferdinand and Trevor Sinclair. He won QPR's player of the season award in 1993, 1994 and 1995, becoming the first player ever to win a club player of the season award for three consecutive seasons.

In 1997, he moved to West Ham United for £1.2m.

Impey transferred to Leicester City in the middle of the 1998–99 season; Hammers manager Harry Redknapp was notably aggrieved at this transfer as Impey had been sold by the West Ham board without his consent. While at Leicester, Impey was part of their 2000 League Cup winning team, coming on as a substitute in the final.

Impey joined Nottingham Forest on loan in February 2004, where he scored the opening goal of the game on his debut against Walsall to end Forest's goal drought. He then made the move permanent in the summer. Impey became a cult hero to Forest fans after, whilst warming up on the touchline, they began chanting "Andy Impey's got no neck! He's just a head on some shoulders!" Impey subsequently turned round and revealed his neck to the fans, starting an onslaught of songs about the neckless wonder.

In September 2005 Impey joined Coventry City on non-contract terms, leaving the club in 2006 and subsequently retiring.

== International career ==
Impey played for the England U21s once in 1992. He was also called up to Terry Venables' get-together England squad in April 1995, but ultimately was never capped for the senior side.

== Coaching career ==
In 2015, he re-joined QPR as an academy coach and is currently the under-23s' assistant coach.

== Honours ==
Leicester City

- Football League Cup: 1999–2000
