= Tony Roberts (footballer) =

Welsh footballer

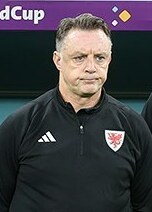
- Roberts with Wales at the 2022 FIFA World Cup

Personal information
- Full name: Anthony Mark Roberts
- Date of birth: 4 August 1969 (age 57)
- Place of birth: Holyhead, Wales
- Height: 6 ft 0 in (1.83 m)
- Position: Goalkeeper

Team information
- Current team: Shanghai Shenhua (goalkeeping coach)

Youth career
- 1979–1982: Bodedern
- 1982–1986: Holyhead United Juniors
- 1986–1987: Queens Park Rangers

Senior career*
Years	Team	Apps	(Gls)
1987–1998	Queens Park Rangers	122	(0)
1998	Millwall	8	(0)
1999–2000	St. Albans City	44	(0)
2000	Atlanta Silverbacks	?	(0)
2000–2012	Dagenham & Redbridge	445	(0)
Total		619	(0)

International career
1990–1991	Wales U21	2	(0)
1993–1996	Wales	2	(0)
- * Club domestic league appearances and goals

Anthony Mark Roberts (born 4 August 1969) is a Welsh football coach and former professional footballer, who is the current goalkeeping coach of Shanghai Shenhua.

As a player, he was as a goalkeeper who notably played in the Premier League for Queens Park Rangers over various seasons before dropping down into the Football League with the club in 1996. He later played for Millwall, St. Albans City, Atlanta Silverbacks and Dagenham & Redbridge. He was capped twice by Wales.

Since retiring, Roberts moved into coaching and returned to Queens Park Rangers before later becoming an academy coach at Arsenal. He has since worked as a goalkeeping coach for Swansea City, Hebei China Fortune, Birmingham City and AC Milan.

== Early life ==
As a child, Roberts attended Ysgol Thomas Elis and Holyhead County School.

== Career ==
=== Early career ===
Roberts first became involved in football with Bodedern before joining Holyhead United Juniors at the age of twelve. After impressing one of the club's scouts, he was offered a trial with Chelsea but was forced to cancel after picking up an injury. Instead he was recommended to Queens Park Rangers by Brian Law at the age of sixteen.

=== Queens Park Rangers ===
He progressed through the ranks at Loftus Road, making his debut against Coventry City in December 1987. He served as understudy to David Seaman during his early years with the club before taking over as the club's first choice goalkeeper after a number of years competing with Jan Stejskal, following the departure of Seaman in 1990. A broken finger sustained in a match against Ipswich Town in January 1998 saw Roberts fall out of favour with the club, resulting in a move to Millwall at the end of the 1997–98 season. In 2003, he was given a testimonial match by QPR.

=== Retirement and return ===
Roberts played just eight times at The New Den when he suffered a recurrence of his finger injury which forced him to end his League career. He spent seven months away from football, returning in 1999 with non-League side St Albans City, making his debut in a 1–0 defeat to Slough Town. He later moved to the United States with the Atlanta Silverbacks, where he spent three months before returning to England. While playing in America, Roberts began wearing a splint inside his glove to solve his finger injury problem.

=== Dagenham & Redbridge ===
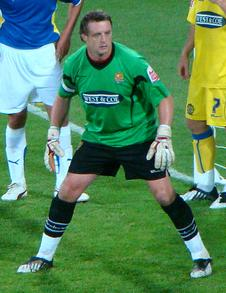
Roberts playing for Dagenham & Redbridge in 2009

In 2000, Roberts joined Dagenham & Redbridge, managed by his former St Albans boss Garry Hill. Whilst playing for the club, Roberts became only the second goalkeeper ever to score a goal in an FA Cup tie when he scored against Basingstoke Town in a fourth qualifying round tie in October 2001. Remaining the club's first choice goalkeeper since his arrival, Roberts broke the appearance record at the club and was handed a testimonial match against West Ham United in 2007. Roberts also holds the record for the only goalkeeper ever to be sent off in the FA Cup in the opposing area when he was red carded after a clash with Peter Clarke during a 5–2 defeat to Southend United in the third round of the FA Cup on 5 January 2008.

In the 2006–07 season, Roberts was part of the side that achieved promotion to The Football League after finishing as champions of the Conference National, having missed out on two previous occasions, on goal difference to Boston United in the 2001–02 season before losing the Conference play-off final to Doncaster Rovers the following year. To return to The Football League, Roberts was forced to repay part of his £150,000 compensation package originally given to him on his retirement from professional football in 1998. Helping the club avoid relegation before reaching eighth position the following year, he made his 400th appearance for the club against Accrington Stanley on 21 February 2009 and signed a new one-year contract at the end of the season. He took up the option of a further one-year contract with Dagenham in June 2011.

Roberts announced his second retirement before a pre-season friendly before West Ham United, on 26 July 2011. It came after Roberts made over 400 appearances for the Daggers between the years of 2000 and 2011 scoring one goal against Basingstoke Town in the fourth qualifying round of the FA Cup in 2001, he still remains the one of three goalkeeper to have scored in the FA Cup being the second to Alan Cooling of Hampton in 1977, also he is the only goalkeeper to be sent off in the opposing box also in the FA Cup, this was against Southend United in 2008 after a foul on Peter Clarke.

== International career ==
Roberts had previously been capped at under-18 level for Wales before earning his first cap for the under-21 side on 5 December 1990 in a 0–0 draw with England. His performance in the match earned him his first call-up to the senior side one month later.

During his career, he won two full international caps as a substitute in matches against the Republic of Ireland on 17 February 1993 and San Marino on 31 August 1996, as well as being selected 30 times as backup goalkeeper to Neville Southall. He also became the first Welshman to be capped at both full and semi-professional level as he helped his country win the non-league 'Home International' series twice.

== Coaching career ==
Roberts combined goalkeeper duties at Dagenham & Redbridge with a coaching role at Queens Park Rangers, and then at Arsenal, whom he joined as assistant goalkeeping coach in 2008–09. He moved to Swansea City as first-team goalkeeping coach in June 2015. In August 2016, he became goalkeeping coach for the Wales national team, where he worked under Chris Coleman. He combined the role with his Swansea job. In June 2018, he left Swansea to join Coleman at Hebei China Fortune. He was appointed to Aitor Karanka's staff as goalkeeper coach of Birmingham City in October 2020, and left at the end of June 2021. In June 2021, he was appointed as the goalkeeping coach of Wolverhampton Wanderers. In August 2023, Roberts moved to Italy to become goalkeeper coach for Serie A side AC Milan before, in September 2024, he joined Norwich City as Head of Goalkeeping. On 8 January 2026, Roberts joined Chinese Super League club as goalkeeping coach.

== Honours ==
Dagenham & Redbridge

- Football League Two play-offs: 2010
- Conference National: 2006–07
