= Rufus Brevett =

English footballer (born 1969)

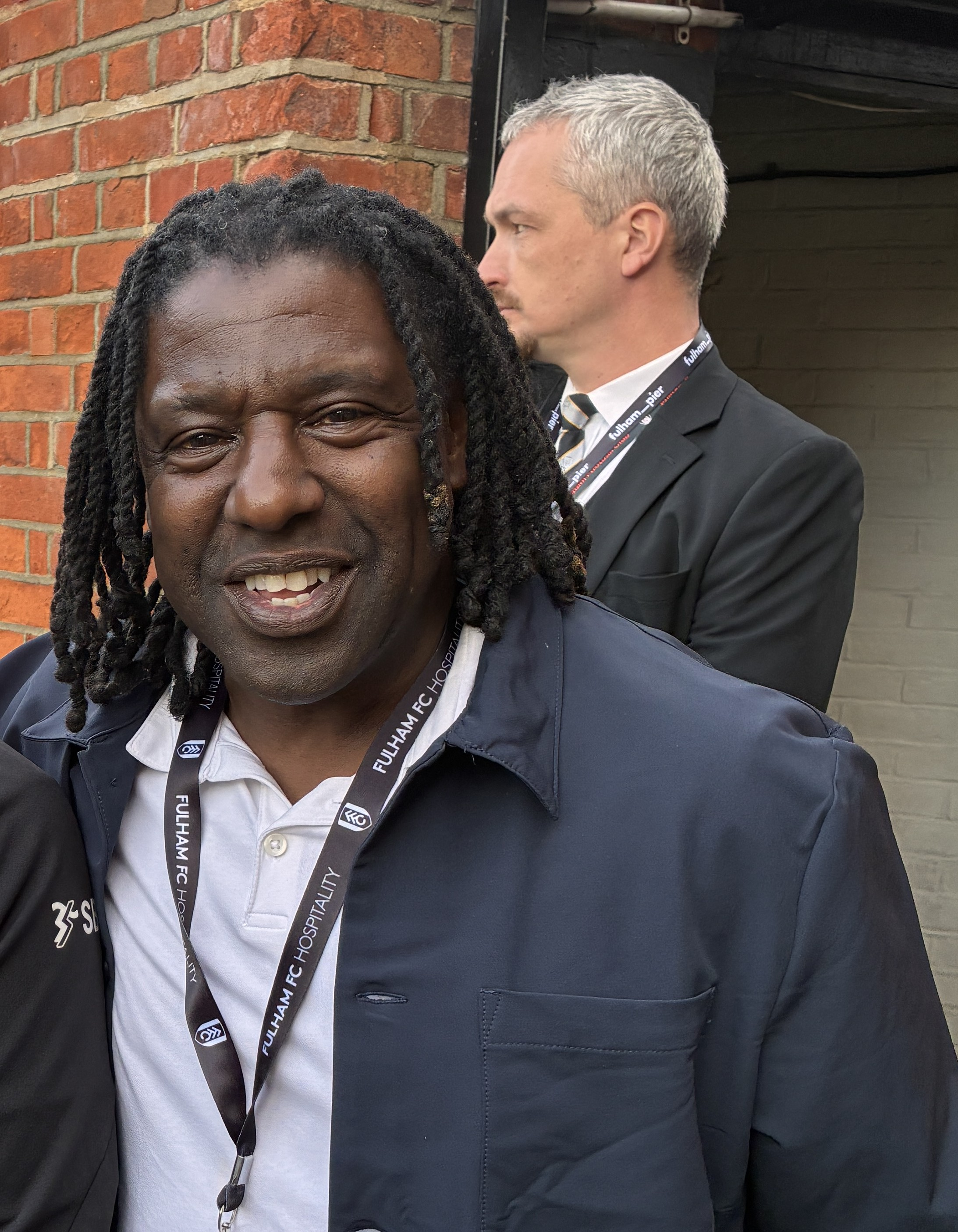
- Brevett in 2026.

Personal information
- Date of birth: 24 September 1969 (age 57)
- Place of birth: Derby, England
- Position: Defender

Youth career
- Doncaster Rovers

Senior career*
Years	Team	Apps	(Gls)
1988–1991	Doncaster Rovers	109	(3)
1991–1998	Queens Park Rangers	153	(1)
1998–2003	Fulham	175	(1)
2003–2005	West Ham United	25	(1)
2005–2006	Plymouth Argyle	13	(0)
2006	→ Leicester City (loan)	1	(0)
2006–2007	Oxford United	21	(0)
Total		497	(6)

Managerial career
- 2013–2014: Arlesey Town
- 2016–2018: Hanworth Villa
- * Club domestic league appearances and goals

Rufus Brevett (born 24 September 1969) is an English football manager and former professional player.

As a player, he was a defender who notably played in the Premier League for Queens Park Rangers, Fulham and West Ham United. He was part of the Fulham team that won the UEFA Intertoto Cup in 2002. He also played in the Football League for Doncaster Rovers, Plymouth Argyle, Leicester City and Oxford United.

After retiring, Brevett was manager of non-league side Arlesey Town between 2013 and 2014. He was most recently the manager of Hanworth Villa, having been appointed in May 2016.

== Playing career ==
Born in Derby having studied at Homelands Comprehensive School, Brevett started at Doncaster Rovers before moving to Queens Park Rangers in February 1991 for a fee of £150,000 This stood as the highest transfer fee received for any player at Doncaster Rovers until the 2009–10 season.

He made his QPR debut in March 1991 against Tottenham Hotspur and in all played 153 league games for QPR, scoring his only goal for them against Southampton in the Premier League. After QPR's relegation from the Premier League Brevett stayed with the club, later moving to Fulham, a team with which he was able to re-enter England's top league, as a regular starter, after two campaigns as champions (from Tier 3 in 1999 and Tier 2 in 2001). During his spell at Fulham he scored twice: the winner in a league match against Stoke City in September 1998 and an equaliser against Rochdale in the Football League Cup in September 2001.

Brevett signed for West Ham United in early 2003 for an undisclosed fee, joining their unsuccessful relegation battle. He stayed with the team for the duration of his two-and-a-half-year contract, although his tenure was severely hampered by a foot injury which required multiple surgeries. At West Ham he scored once against Crewe Alexandra in August 2004. He then moved on to Plymouth Argyle.

On 8 September 2006, Brevett signed for Oxford United on a month-by-month contract which was extended for the full season. He featured regularly in Oxford's promotion run, but his contract was not renewed after the season's end. In May 2007 Brevett announced his retirement from playing football. In July 2007 he briefly became sporting director of Swindon Town.

== Managerial career ==
In October 2008, Brevett joined Combined Counties League Premier Division team Bedfont as assistant manager.

In November 2013, Brevett was appointed as the new Arlesey Town manager, replacing Zema Abbey. He parted company with Arlesey Town in December 2014, stepping down as manager and director of football.

In January 2015, Brevett was a finalist for the Harrow Borough job alongside former teammate Kevin Gallen, but the job went to Steve Baker. In the following month, Brevett agreed to take up a position as a coach with Banbury United, assisting manager Paul Davis.

Between May 2016 and December 2018, Brevett returned to football management at Combined Counties League side Hanworth Villa.

== Personal life ==
He currently teaches physical education at North Oxfordshire Academy in Banbury, head of football academy. Brevett is of Jamaican descent and he stated after his retirement that he regretted not representing them internationally.

== Honours ==
Fulham

- Football League First Division: 2000–01
- Football League Second Division: 1998–99
- UEFA Intertoto Cup: 2002

Individual

- PFA Team of the Year: 1990–91 Fourth Division, 1998–99 Second Division
