= Clive Wilson =

English footballer

Personal information
- Full name: Euclid Aklana Wilson
- Date of birth: 13 November 1961 (age 65)
- Place of birth: Manchester, England
- Height: 5 ft 7 in (1.70 m)
- Positions: Left midfielder; left-back (Note: Wilson played a left-back later in his career.)

Senior career*
Years	Team	Apps	(Gls)
1979–1987	Manchester City	98	(9)
1982–1983	→ Chester City (loan)	21	(2)
1987–1990	Chelsea	81	(5)
1987	→ Manchester City (loan)	11	(0)
1990–1995	Queens Park Rangers	173	(12)
1995–1999	Tottenham Hotspur	70	(1)
1999–2000	Cambridge United	27	(0)
Total		481	(29)
- * Club domestic league appearances and goals

Euclid Aklana Wilson (born 13 November 1961) is an English former professional footballer who played in midfield and at left-back.

He notably played top flight football for Manchester City, Chelsea, Queens Park Rangers and Tottenham Hotspur, with appearances for QPR and Spurs coming in the Premier League. He also played in the Football League with Chester City and Cambridge United.

After his playing career ended, he became a supply teacher at Davenant Foundation School in Loughton, Essex. He now teaches Physical Education and is a supply teacher at Roding Valley High School in Loughton Essex. He was also a Physical Education teacher at St. Johns secondary school in Epping.

== Playing career ==
=== Manchester City ===
Wilson was a member of the Manchester City youth team which lost to Aston Villa in the 1980 FA Youth Cup Final. He made his first team debut in a League Cup tie against Stoke City in October 1981. After a productive spell on loan at Chester produced more than 20 league appearances, Wilson's subsequent appearances were infrequent until the 1984/85 season which saw him win a regular place on the left side of midfield.

Upon Paul Power's departure for Everton in 1986 Wilson reverted to the number three shirt for the 1986/87 first division campaign.

=== Chelsea ===
After City's relegation Wilson signed for Chelsea, where he played regularly on the left of midfield before moving on to Queens Park Rangers in 1990.

=== Queens Park Rangers ===
Wilson made his QPR debut against Nottingham Forest in a 1–1 draw at the City Ground in August 1990. He was signed as a midfielder for QPR but the following season the new QPR boss, Gerry Francis, switched him to play left-back. It was here that Wilson truly found his position as his speed allied to his excellent passing ability made him an excellent defender. Over the next four seasons he was a near ever-present for Rangers and he went on to play 172 league games for the R's, scoring 12 goals, all but one scored from the penalty spot.

=== Tottenham Hotspur ===
In the summer of 1995 he was allowed to leave on a free transfer and he joined Tottenham Hotspur (signed by his ex QPR boss Gerry Francis) where he turned out for another four seasons, despite being in the twilight of his career. He scored once in the league for Tottenham against Leicester City in September 1996, and once in the FA Cup against Wolverhampton Wanderers in January 1996. He made just one appearance in his final season at Spurs (1998–99), against Liverpool in the League Cup.

=== Cambridge United ===
He left Spurs in 1999 and played one more season for Cambridge United, ensuring their survival in Division Two a season after promotion, before retiring.

== Personal life ==
Born to Jamaican parents, Wilson was named after the scientist Euclid by his father. He chose to use the name Clive however in later life.

His younger brother, Gus Wilson, was also a professional footballer who started as a trainee at Manchester City. His daughter, Siobhan Wilson, played collegiate in the United States for Georgia State University and has also played professionally for Málaga and Sassuolo.

In 2009, Clive started teaching at Davenant Foundation School in Loughton, Essex, and now teaches at Roding Valley High School, Loughton, Essex. As well as teaching Physical Education, he also substitutes for subjects such as English, Maths, History and Geography.

Clive has spent some time coaching at Chigwell based football club, Colebrook Royals FC.

== Honours ==
Manchester City

- Full Members' Cup runner-up: 1985–86

Chelsea

- Football League Second Division: 1988–89
