= David Bardsley =

English footballer (born 1964)

Personal information
- Full name: David John Bardsley
- Date of birth: 11 September 1964 (age 62)
- Place of birth: Manchester, England
- Height: 5 ft 10 in (1.78 m)
- Position: Defender

Senior career*
Years	Team	Apps	(Gls)
1981–1983	Blackpool	45	(0)
1983–1987	Watford	100	(7)
1987–1989	Oxford United	74	(7)
1989–1998	Queens Park Rangers	253	(4)
1998–2000	Blackpool	64	(0)
2001	Northwich Victoria	2	(0)
Total		538	(18)

International career
1983	England Youth	2	(0)
1992–1993	England	2	(0)
- * Club domestic league appearances and goals

David John Bardsley (born 11 September 1964) is an English football coach and former professional footballer.

As a player, he was a defender, playing in the Premier League for Queens Park Rangers. He also played in the Football League with Blackpool, Watford and Oxford United before finishing his career with non-league side Northwich Victoria. He was capped twice by the England national team.

After his retirement, he opened football schools in England and the United States and has previously worked for Eredivise side AFC Ajax as a Florida-based coach for their American affiliate team.

== Club career ==
Bardsley started with Blackpool in 1982 and subsequently moved to Watford in 1983 for £150,000 where he was noted for his pace, and played every game in Watford's run to the 1984 FA Cup Final, where they eventually lost to Everton. He played 121 matches in all competitions for Watford, scoring nine goals. In September 1987 Bardsley transferred to Oxford United to replace David Langan for a then club record of £265,000. He played 89 games for Oxford, scoring seven goals. In 1989 Bardsley completed a £500,000 move to QPR.

Bardsley played in the QPR team of the early to mid-1990s that finished fifth in the Premier League in 1992–93, eighth in 1993–94 and eighth in 1995. He was part of the Premier League Team of the Year for 1992–93, the inaugural season of the Premier League.

After QPR's relegation from the Premier League in 1996, Bardsley suffered a potentially career-threatening Achilles tendon injury that kept him out for the best part of two seasons. He returned at the end of the 1997–98 season in the midst of a relegation battle under Ray Harford's management. In total, he played 253 games in nine seasons for QPR, scoring four goals, helping keep QPR in Division One and the Premier League.

Bardsley was released on a free transfer at the end of the 1997–98 season and returned to play for his first club, Blackpool. After leaving Blackpool, he played for non-League Northwich Victoria.

== International career ==
Bardsley's international career started at youth level, where he earned six England Youth International caps, before progressing to earn four England U21 caps. While at QPR, Bardsley was capped twice for England by his former club manager Graham Taylor during the 1992–93 season, playing against Spain and Poland in a Friendly and a World Cup Qualifier respectively.

== Coaching career ==
After Northwich Victoria, Bardsley opened his own soccer schools. He subsequently moved to America and in March 2007 BBC Sport reported that he was the director of Ajax's academy in Florida. His schools subsequently ended their association with Ajax, but continued to coach a couple of teams until 2016.

== Honours ==
Watford

- FA Cup runner-up: 1983–84

Individual

- PFA Team of the Year: 1988–89 Second Division, 1992–93 Premier League
