= Danny Maddix =

Footballer (born 1967)

Personal information
- Full name: Daniel Shawn Maddix
- Date of birth: 11 October 1967 (age 59)
- Place of birth: Ashford, England
- Height: 5 ft 10 in (1.78 m)
- Position: Defender

Youth career
- 1985–1986: Tottenham Hotspur

Senior career*
Years	Team	Apps	(Gls)
1986–1987	Tottenham Hotspur	0	(0)
1986	→ Southend United (loan)	2	(0)
1987–2001	Queens Park Rangers	295	(13)
2001–2003	Sheffield Wednesday	59	(2)
2003–2004	Barnet	33	(0)
2005–2006	Grays Athletic	?	(?)
Total		389	(15)

International career
1998	Jamaica	1	(0)

Managerial career
- 2004: Barnet (caretaker)
- * Club domestic league appearances and goals

Daniel Shawn Maddix (born 11 October 1967) is a former professional footballer who played as a defender, notably in the Premier League for Queens Park Rangers, having come through the academy at Tottenham Hotspur. He also had spells in the English Football League for Southend United, Sheffield Wednesday and Barnet before finishing his career in non-league with Grays Athletic. Whilst with Barnet in 2004, Maddix was temporarily appointed as caretaker manager. He has since worked away from the professional game and has coached at amateur level.

== Club career ==
Maddix started his career as a trainee at Tottenham Hotspur but never appeared for the first team. He was loaned to Southend United in 1986 for whom he made two appearances; however, he left the club after one senior season in the first team at White Hart Lane.

He joined Division 1 London rivals Queens Park Rangers in 1987, making his debut in November of that year, and racking up 348 appearances for QPR over 13 seasons and scoring 18 goals. Though later afflicted by injury problems, Maddix established a reputation as an effective and consistent man-marking centre half alongside Alan McDonald. He spent a handful of seasons in the Premier League with QPR and continued to play for the Loftus Road club after they were relegated in 1996.

He signed for Sheffield Wednesday in 2001 where he made over 50 starts but was released after the club suffered relegation to the third tier of English football in the 2002–03 season.

He signed for Barnet on 12 July 2003 and ended his career in December 2004. He was briefly joint caretaker manager with Ian Hendon between the departure of Martin Allen and the arrival of Paul Fairclough.

Following his departure from Barnet, Maddix joined Grays Athletic and stayed with the club until the end of the 2005–06 season. Since retiring, he has coached the Chigwell-based youth football club Colebrook Royals.

== International career ==
Though English by birth, Maddix's Jamaican roots saw him picked for the Jamaica in 1998 in a World Cup warm-up game against Iran.

== Personal life ==
He is the uncle of comedian Jamali Maddix.
