= 1986–87 Rangers F.C. season =

Rangers
1986–87 season
- Chairman: David Holmes
- Manager: Graeme Souness
- Ground: Ibrox Stadium
- Scottish Premier Division: 1st (champions)
- Scottish Cup: Third round
- League Cup: Winners
- UEFA Cup: Third round
- Glasgow Cup: Winners
- Top goalscorer: League: Ally McCoist (34); All: Ally McCoist (38)

The 1986–87 season was the 107th season of competitive football by Rangers.

== Overview ==
Rangers played a total of 56 competitive matches during the 1986–87 season. The team finished top of the Scottish Premier Division for the first time in nine seasons. A total of 69 points were gained from 44 games and a lead of six points over second placed Celtic.

The Souness Revolution began with the signing of England internationals, goalkeeper Chris Woods and centre half Terry Butcher. Northern Ireland international Jimmy Nicholl rejoined the club and Colin West was brought in to partner Ally McCoist in attack. In December Graham Roberts arrived from Tottenham Hotspur to strengthen the defence.

There was a disappointing start to the league campaign, losing 2–1 to Hibernian at Easter Road. Graeme Souness was sent off for a tackle on George McCluskey in the centre circle, with both teams displaying a lack of discipline at that moment.

On the penultimate day of the season the Championship was secured at Pittodrie with a 1–1 draw against Aberdeen. A Terry Butcher header was enough to bring the league title back to Ibrox for the first time since 1978.

In the cup competitions, Rangers were knocked out of the Scottish Cup in the third round, losing 1–0 at Ibrox to Hamilton Academical. The goal ended a run of 1196 minutes without conceding – a British record for goalkeeper Chris Woods.

They won the League Cup, defeating Celtic 2–1 with goals from Ian Durrant and Davie Cooper. This was an early success for Graeme Souness and helped pave the way towards the Championship.

The European campaign was moderately successful. Rangers reached the third round of the UEFA Cup after beating Ilves Tampere and Boavista before being knocked out by Borussia Mönchengladbach on the away goals rule.

== Transfer ==
=== In ===
Date	Player	From	Fee
16 May 1986	(England) Colin West	(England) Watford	£200,000
1 July 1986	(England) Chris Woods	(England) Norwich City	£600,000
1 August 1986	(England) Terry Butcher	(England) Ipswich Town	£725,000
8 August 1986	(Northern Ireland) Jimmy Nicholl	(England) West Bromwich Albion	Swap
14 November 1986	(Scotland) Lindsay Hamilton	(Scotland) Stenhousemuir	£25,000
22 December 1986	(England) Neil Woods	(England) Doncaster Rovers	£120,000
23 December 1986	(England) Graham Roberts	(England) Tottenham Hotspur	£450,000
27 March 1987	(England) Jimmy Phillips	(England) Bolton Wanderers	£95,000

=== Out ===
Date	Player	From	Fee
9 May 1986	(Scotland) Billy Davies	(Sweden) Jönköpings Södra IF	Free
9 May 1986	(Scotland) Derek Johnstone	(Scotland) Partick Thistle	Free
9 May 1986	(Scotland) Dave MacKinnon	(Scotland) Airdrieonians	Free
9 August 1986	(Scotland) Bobby Williamson	(England) West Bromwich Albion	Swap
19 January 1987	(Scotland) Ted McMinn	(Spain) Sevilla	£225,000

- Expenditure: ▼£2,215,000
- Income: ▲£225,000
- Total loss/gain: ▼£1,990,000

== Results ==
All results are written with Rangers' score first.

=== Scottish Premier Division ===
Date	Opponent	Venue	Result	Attendance	Scorers
9 August 1986	Hibernian	A	1–2	24,576	McCoist (pen.)
13 August 1986	Falkirk	H	1–0	27,362	McCoist (pen.)
16 August 1986	Dundee United	H	2–3	43,995	McCoist (2)
23 August 1986	Hamilton Academical	A	2–1	10,000	Fraser, West
31 August 1986	Celtic	H	1–0	43,502	Durrant
6 September 1986	Motherwell	A	2–0	17,013	Cooper, McPherson
13 September 1986	Clydebank	H	4–0	26,433	Fleck (3), McMinn
20 September 1986	Dundee	A	0–1	17,132	
27 September 1986	Aberdeen	H	2–0	40,155	Souness, McCoist
4 October 1986	Heart of Midlothian	A	1–1	28,637	Cooper
8 October 1986	St Mirren	A	1–0	16,861	Cooper
11 October 1986	Hibernian	H	3–0	38,196	McPherson, Fleck, Bell
18 October 1986	Falkirk	A	5–1	16,800	Fleck (3, 1 (pen.)), Cooper, McCoist
29 October 1986	Dundee United	A	0–0	20,170	
1 November 1986	Celtic	A	1–1	60,000	McCoist
8 November 1986	Motherwell	H	0–1	33,966	
15 November 1986	Clydebank	A	4–1	9,906	McCoist (2), McPherson, Durrant
19 November 1986	Dundee	H	2–1	22,992	McCoist, McPherson
22 November 1986	Aberdeen	A	0–1	21,733	
29 November 1986	Heart of Midlothian	H	3–0	38,733	McCoist, Cooper, Durrant
3 December 1986	St Mirren	H	2–0	23,110	McPherson, Cooper
6 December 1986	Hibernian	A	0–0	18,536	
13 December 1986	Falkirk	H	4–0	24,177	Fleck (2), Cooper, Butcher
20 December 1986	Hamilton Academical	A	2–0	10,000	Fleck, McCoist
27 December 1986	Dundee United	H	2–0	42,165	McCoist, Fleck
1 January 1987	Celtic	H	2–0	43,206	Fleck, McCoist
6 January 1987	Motherwell	A	1–0	19,658	Roberts
10 January 1987	Clydebank	H	5–0	36,397	Fleck (3), McCoist (2, 1 (pen.))
17 January 1987	Hamilton Academical	H	2–0	43,052	Durrant, McCoist
24 January 1987	Aberdeen	H	0–0	43,211	
7 February 1987	Heart of Midlothian	A	5–2	29,091	Fleck (2), Roberts, McCoist, Black (o.g.)
14 February 1987	St Mirren	A	3–1	21,399	McCoist (3, 1 (pen.))
28 February 1987	Hibernian	H	1–1	38,630	McPherson
7 March 1987	Falkirk	A	2–1	18,000	McCoist (2)
14 March 1987	Hamilton Academical	H	2–0	33,486	Cooper, McCoist
17 March 1987	Dundee	A	4–0	18,723	McCoist (2), McPherson, Fleck
21 March 1987	Dundee United	A	1–0	21,275	McPherson
28 March 1987	Motherwell	H	1–0	37,305	McCoist
4 April 1987	Celtic	A	1–3	60,800	McCoist
14 April 1987	Dundee	H	2–0	42,427	Cooper, McCoist
18 April 1987	Clydebank	A	3–0	9,950	McCoist (2, 1 (pen.)), West
25 April 1987	Heart of Midlothian	H	3–0	43,205	McCoist (3, 1 (pen.))
2 May 1987	Aberdeen	A	1–1	22,568	Butcher
9 May 1987	St Mirren	H	1–0	43,510	Fleck

=== Scottish League Cup ===
Date	Round	Opponent	Venue	Result	Attendance	Scorers
20 August 1986	R2	Stenhousemuir	A	4–1	9,052	Souness, West, Cooper, McCoist
27 August 1986	R3	East Fife	A	0–0*	8,835	
3 September 1986	QF	Dundee	H	3–1	33,750	Fraser, Souness, McMinn
24 September 1986	SF	Dundee United	N	2–1	45,249	McCoist, McMinn
26 October 1986	F	Celtic	N	2–1	74,219	Durrant, Cooper (pen.)

*Rangers won the match 5–4 on penalties

=== Scottish Cup ===
Date	Round	Opponent	Venue	Result	Attendance	Scorers
31 January 1987	R3	Hamilton Academical	H	0–1	35,462	

=== UEFA Cup ===
Date	Round	Opponent	Venue	Result	Attendance	Scorers
17 September 1986	R1	(Finland) Ilves Tampere	H	4–0	27,436	Fleck (3), McCoist
1 October 1986	R1	(Finland) Ilves Tampere	A	0–2	2,109	
24 October 1986	R2	(Portugal) Boavista	H	2–1	38,772	McPherson, McCoist
4 November 1986	R2	(Portugal) Boavista	A	1–0	23,000	Ferguson
26 November 1986	R3	(Germany) Borussia Mönchengladbach	H	1–1	33,000	Durrant
10 December 1986	R3	(Germany) Borussia Monchengladbach	A	0–0	36,000	

=== Glasgow Cup ===
Date	Round	Opponent	Venue	Result	Attendance	Scorers
28 April 1987	SF	Clyde	N	1–1	4,000	Spencer
7 May 1987	F	Celtic	A	1–0	15,109	

== Appearances ==
Player	Position	Appearances	Goals
(Scotland) Nicky Walker	GK	2	0
(England) Chris Woods	GK	48	0
(England) Terry Butcher	DF	49	2
(Scotland) Hugh Burns	DF	5	0
(Scotland) Ally Dawson	DF	10	0
(Scotland) Dave McPherson	DF	47	8
(Scotland) Stuart Munro	DF	48	0
(Northern Ireland) Jimmy Nicholl	DF	39	0
(Scotland) Scott Nisbet	DF	1	0
(Scotland) Craig Paterson	DF	2	0
(England) Jimmy Phillips	DF	6	0
(England) Graham Roberts	DF	19	2
(Scotland) Dougie Bell	MF	12	1
(Scotland) Davie Cooper	MF	48	11
(Scotland) Ian Durrant	MF	45	5
(Scotland) Derek Ferguson	MF	33	0
(Scotland) Robert Fleck	MF	44	19
(Scotland) Cammy Fraser	MF	21	2
(Scotland) Davie Kirkwood	MF	1	0
(Scotland) Dave MacFarlane	MF	5	0
(Scotland) Ted McMinn	MF	19	3
(Scotland) Bobby Russell	MF	1	0
(Scotland) Graeme Souness	MF	29	3
(Scotland) Ally McCoist	FW	50	36
(England) Colin West	FW	12	3
(England) Neil Woods	FW	3	0

== League table ==
Pos	Team	Pld	W	D	L	GF	GA	GD	Pts	Qualification or relegation
1	Rangers (C)	44	31	7	6	85	23	+62	69	Qualification for the European Cup first round
2	Celtic	44	27	9	8	90	41	+49	63	Qualification for the UEFA Cup first round
3	Dundee United	44	24	12	8	66	36	+30	60	Qualification for the UEFA Cup first round
4	Aberdeen	44	21	16	7	63	29	+34	58	Qualification for the UEFA Cup first round
5	Heart of Midlothian	44	21	14	9	64	43	+21	56	

Source: Statto
Rules for classification: 1) points; 2) goal difference; 3) number of goals scored.
(C) Champions

== See also ==
- 1986–87 in Scottish football
- 1986–87 Scottish Cup
- 1986–87 Scottish League Cup
- 1986–87 UEFA Cup
