= 1987–88 Rangers F.C. season =

Rangers
1987–88 season
- Chairman: David Holmes
- Manager: Graeme Souness
- Ground: Ibrox Stadium
- Scottish Premier Division: 3rd
- Scottish Cup: Fourth round
- League Cup: Winners
- European Cup: Quarter-finals
- Top goalscorer: League: Ally McCoist (31); All: Ally McCoist (42)

The 1987–88 season was the 108th season of competitive football by Rangers.

== Overview ==
Rangers played a total of 58 competitive matches during the 1987–88 season. The team finished a disappointing third in the Scottish Premier Division with 60 points, two behind Hearts and twelve behind champions Celtic.

Future club captain Richard Gough was signed from Tottenham Hotspur for a club record fee of £1.1m.

In the cup competitions, they were knocked out of the Scottish Cup in the fourth round, losing 2–0 away to Dunfermline Athletic. They won the League Cup (Skol Cup), defeating Aberdeen 5–3 on penalties after the match was drawn 3–3.

The European campaign was fairly successful. The club reached the quarter-final of the European Cup after beating Dynamo Kiev and Górnik Zabrze before being knocked out by Steaua Bucharest.

Rangers defeated English Champions Everton in the Dubai Super Cup in December. The match ended 2–2 with Rangers winning the penalty shootout 8–7. The match was dubbed the unofficial British Championship decider by the football media.

== Transfers ==
=== In ===
Date	Player	From	Fee
May 1987	(Israel) Avi Cohen	(Israel) Maccabi Tel Aviv	
1987	(England) Mark Falco	(England) Watford	
September 1987	(England) Trevor Francis	(Italy) Atalanta	£75,000
2 October 1987	(Scotland) Richard Gough	(England) Tottenham Hotspur	£1,100,000
30 December 1987	(England) Mark Walters	(England) Aston Villa	£500,000
15 January 1988	(Scotland) John Brown	(Scotland) Dundee	£350,000
15 February 1988	(Scotland) Ian Ferguson	(Scotland) St Mirren	£850,000

=== Out ===
Date	Player	From	Fee
December 1987	(Scotland) Robert Fleck	(England) Norwich City	£580,000

- Expenditure: ▼£2,875,000
- Income: ▲£580,000
- Total loss/gain: ▼£2,295,000

== Results ==
All results are written with Rangers' score first.

=== Scottish Premier Division ===
Date	Opponent	Venue	Result	Attendance	Scorers
8 August 1987	Dundee United	H	1–1	39,120	McCoist (pen.)
12 August 1987	Hibernian	A	0–1	22,000	
15 August 1987	Aberdeen	A	0–2	22,568	
22 August 1987	Falkirk	H	4–0	32,340	McCoist (3), Falco
29 August 1987	Celtic	A	0–1	60,800	
5 September 1987	Dundee	H	2–1	38,302	Fleck, McCoist
12 September 1987	Dunfermline Athletic	H	4–0	39,749	McCoist (3), Souness
19 September 1987	Motherwell	A	1–0	19,480	Philliben (o.g.)
26 September 1987	Greenock Morton	H	7–0	35,843	McCoist (3), Falco (3), Fleck
3 October 1987	Heart of Midlothian	A	0–0	28,637	
6 October 1987	St Mirren	H	3–1	39,298	Falco, Butcher, Souness
10 October 1987	Dundee United	A	0–1	18,214	
17 October 1987	Celtic	H	2–2	44,500	McCoist, Gough
28 October 1987	Dunfermline Athletic	A	4–0	18,070	Durrant (2), McCall (pen.), McCoist
31 October 1987	Motherwell	H	1–0	36,583	McCoist
7 November 1987	Hibernian	H	1–0	37,571	Fleck
14 November 1987	St Mirren	A	2–2	20,649	McCoist (2)
17 November 1987	Aberdeen	H	0–1	41,371	
21 November 1987	Falkirk	A	1–0	17,500	Fleck
24 November 1987	Greenock Morton	A	3–0	16,500	D.Ferguson, Fleck, McCoist
28 November 1987	Heart of Midlothian	H	3–2	43,557	Fleck, Durrant, Levein (o.g.)
5 December 1987	Dundee United	H	1–0	41,159	McCoist
12 December 1987	Hibernian	A	2–0	21,000	Gough, Fleck
14 December 1987	Dunfermline Athletic	H	2–2	31,687	D.Ferguson, McCoist
19 December 1987	Motherwell	A	2–0	15,436	McCoist (pen.), Philiben (o.g.)
26 December 1987	Dundee	H	2–0	40,938	McCoist (2, 1 (pen.))
2 January 1988	Celtic	A	0–2	60,800	
6 January 1988	Dundee	A	1–0	17,450	McCoist
9 January 1988	Greenock Morton	H	5–0	38,349	McCoist (3), Durrant
16 January 1988	Heart of Midlothian	A	1–1	28,967	Durrant (pen.)
23 January 1988	Falkirk	H	3–1	41,088	Bartram, Brown, Durrant (pen.)
6 February 1988	Aberdeen	A	2–1	22,500	McCoist, Gough
13 February 1988	St Mirren	H	4–0	41,664	Cooper, Walters, Wilkins, Gough
27 February 1988	Dundee United	A	1–1	20,846	Walters
5 March 1988	Dunfermline Athletic	A	3–0	19,017	McCoist (pen.), Walters, Gough
12 March 1988	Motherwell	H	1–0	39,650	Durrant
20 March 1988	Celtic	H	1–2	43,650	Bartram
26 March 1988	Dundee	A	3–2	14,879	Roberts, Walters, Durrant (pen.)
2 April 1988	Heart of Midlothian	H	1–2	41,125	Bartram
9 April 1988	Greenock Morton	A	2–3	12,000	I.Ferguson, Durrant
16 April 1988	Hibernian	H	1–1	32,218	D.Ferguson
23 April 1988	St Mirren	A	3–0	13,809	Walters, Brown, McCoist
30 April 1988	Aberdeen	H	0–1	36,010	
7 May 1988	Falkirk	A	5–0	14,500	Walters (2), McCoist (2, 1 (pen.)), D.Ferguson

=== Scottish League Cup ===
Date	Round	Opponent	Venue	Result	Attendance	Scorers
19 August 1987	R2	Stirling Albion	A	2–1	13,000	Falco, McCoist
26 August 1987	R3	Dunfermline Athletic	A	4–1	18,070	McCoist (3, 1 (pen.)), Falco
2 September 1987	QF	Heart of Midlothian	H	4–1	40,920	Durrant (2), McCoist (2, 1 (pen.))
23 September 1987	SF	Motherwell	N	3–1	45,938	Fleck, Falco, Kirk (o.g.)
25 October 1987	F	Aberdeen	N	3–3	71,961	Cooper, Durrant, Fleck

*Rangers won the match 5–3 on penalties

=== Scottish Cup ===
Date	Round	Opponent	Venue	Result	Attendance	Scorers
30 January 1988	R3	Raith Rovers	A	0–0	9,500	
10 February 1988	R3 R	Raith Rovers	H	4–1	35,144	Durrant (2, 1 (pen.)), Walters, McCoist
20 February 1988	R4	Dunfermline Athletic	A	0–2	19,360	

=== European Cup ===
Date	Round	Opponent	Venue	Result	Attendance	Scorers
16 September 1987	R1	(Soviet Union) Dynamo Kyiv	A	0–1	100,000	
30 September 1987	R1	(Soviet Union) Dynamo Kiev	H	2–0	44,500	Falco, McCoist
21 October 1987	R2	(Poland) Górnik Zabrze	H	3–1	41,366	McCoist, Durrant, Falco
4 November 1987	R2	(Poland) Gornik Zabrze	A	1–1	23,250	McCoist (pen.)
2 March 1988	QF	(Romania) Steaua București	A	0–2	33,000	
16 March 1988	QF	(Romania) Steaua București	H	2–1	44,000	Gough, McCoist (pen.)

=== Dubai Super Cup ===
Date	Round	Opponent	Venue	Result	Attendance	Scorers
8 December 1987	F	(England) Everton	N	2–2*	8,000	Fleck, McCoist

*Rangers won the match 8–7 on penalties

=== Glasgow Cup ===
Date	Round	Opponent	Venue	Result	Attendance	Scorers
13 April 1988	SF	Partick Thistle	A	2–1*	4,500	Cooper, Spencer

*Competition not completed

== Appearances ==
Player	Position	Appearances	Goals
(Scotland) Nicky Walker	GK	6	0
(England) Chris Woods	GK	52	0
(Denmark) Jan Bartram	DF	14	3
(Scotland) John Brown	DF	12	2
(England) Terry Butcher	DF	18	1
(Israel) Avi Cohen	DF	12	0
(Scotland) Richard Gough	DF	36	6
(Scotland) John McGregor	DF	32	0
(Scotland) Stuart Munro	DF	22	0
(Northern Ireland) Jimmy Nicholl	DF	33	0
(Scotland) Scott Nisbet	DF	29	0
(England) Jimmy Phillips	DF	27	0
(England) Graham Roberts	DF	50	1
(Scotland) Davie Cooper	MF	43	2
(Scotland) Ian Durrant	MF	54	16
(Scotland) Derek Ferguson	MF	43	4
(Scotland) Ian Ferguson	MF	8	1
(Scotland) Robert Fleck	MF	28	9
(Scotland) Davie Kirkwood	MF	7	0
(Scotland) Dave MacFarlane	MF	1	0
(Scotland) Ian McCall	MF	12	1
(Scotland) Graeme Souness	MF	30	2
(England) Mark Walters	MF	21	8
(England) Ray Wilkins	MF	29	1
(England) Mark Falco	FW	19	10
(England) Trevor Francis	FW	25	0
(Scotland) Ally McCoist	FW	53	42
(Scotland) Gary McSwegan	FW	1	0
(England) Colin West	FW	1	0

== League table ==
Pos	Team	Pld	W	D	L	GF	GA	GD	Pts	Qualification or relegation
1	Celtic (C)	44	31	10	3	79	23	+56	72	Qualification for the European Cup first round
2	Heart of Midlothian	44	23	16	5	74	32	+42	62	Qualification for the UEFA Cup first round
3	Rangers	44	26	8	10	85	34	+51	60	Qualification for the UEFA Cup first round
4	Aberdeen	44	21	17	6	56	25	+31	59	Qualification for the UEFA Cup first round
5	Dundee United	44	16	15	13	54	47	+7	47	Qualification for the Cup Winners' Cup first round

Source: Statto
Rules for classification: 1) points; 2) goal difference; 3) number of goals scored.
(C) Champions

== See also ==
- 1987–88 in Scottish football
- 1987–88 Scottish Cup
- 1987–88 Scottish League Cup
- 1987–88 UEFA Cup
