= 1989–90 Rangers F.C. season =

Rangers
1989–90 season
- Chairman: David Holmes (until 2 June); David Murray (from 2 June)
- Manager: Graeme Souness
- Ground: Ibrox Stadium
- Scottish Premier Division: 1st (champions)
- Scottish Cup: Fourth round
- League Cup: Runners-up
- European Cup: First round
- Top goalscorer: League: Mo Johnston (15); All: Ally McCoist (18)

The 1989–90 season was the 110th season of competitive football by Rangers.

== Overview ==
Rangers played a total of 45 competitive matches during the 1989–90 season. On 10 July when Rangers, acting on Souness' say so, purchased former Celtic striker Mo Johnston from French club Nantes for £1.5 million. The fact Rangers signed an ex-Celtic player would have been a big enough story but the fact Johnston was a high-profile Roman Catholic made the move unprecedented. The transfer angered both sides of the Old Firm's support, Rangers because Johnston was an ex-Celt and Catholic (Rangers traditionally did not sign Catholics), and Celtic fans saw Johnston as a turncoat who had already committed to re-join Celtic from Nantes before Rangers made known their interest.

When the season began, Rangers did not. Three matches played in the league, no wins and two defeats. However, the team slowly got into gear, despite only two wins from the first eight games. New arrival Johnston netted the crucial winner during an Old Firm game on 4 November 1989. Scoring the goal in the dying minutes of the match meant Johnston was all but forgiven by the Rangers support. Come May 1990, Rangers' name was on the trophy for the second time in as many seasons but the club again failed to win the Scottish Cup, losing to Celtic in the fourth round, and for once did not win the League Cup. The side lost to Aberdeen by 2–1 in the final.

In Europe they were knocked out the European Cup by German side Bayern Munich, losing the tie 3–1 on aggregate.

== Transfers ==
=== In ===
Date	Player	From	Fee
1 July 1989	(England) Trevor Steven	(England) Everton	£1,525,000
10 July 1989	(Scotland) Mo Johnston	(France) Nantes	£1,500,000
15 August 1989	(Israel) Bonni Ginzburg	(Israel) Beitar Jerusalem	£200,000
30 August 1989	(Scotland) Davie Dodds	(Scotland) Aberdeen	£100,000
3 November 1989	(England) Chris Vinnicombe	(England) Exeter City	£150,000
30 November 1989	(England) Nigel Spackman	(England) Queens Park Rangers	£500,000

=== Out ===
Date	Player	To	Fee
26 May 1989	(Scotland) Andy Gray	(England) Cheltenham Town	Free
5 July 1989	(England) Mel Sterland	(England) Leeds United	£600,000
26 July 1989	(Northern Ireland) Jimmy Nicholl	(Scotland) Dunfermline Athletic	£50,000
29 July 1989	(Scotland) Davie Kirkwood	(Scotland) Heart of Midlothian	£100,000
11 August 1989	(Scotland) Davie Cooper	(Scotland) Motherwell	£50,000
22 August 1989	(Scotland) Nicky Walker	(Scotland) Heart of Midlothian	£125,000
2 October 1989	(England) Kevin Drinkell	(England) Coventry City	£800,000
28 November 1989	(England) Ray Wilkins	(England) Queens Park Rangers	Free
10 January 1990	(Scotland) Ian McCall	(England) Bradford City	£200,000

- Expenditure: ▼£3,975,000
- Income: ▲£1,925,000
- Total loss/gain: ▼£2,050,000

== Results ==
All results are written with Rangers' score first.

=== Scottish Premier Division ===
Date	Opponent	Venue	Result	Attendance	Scorers
12 August 1989	St Mirren	H	0–1	39,951	
19 August 1989	Hibernian	A	0–2	22,500	
26 August 1989	Celtic	A	1–1	54,000	Butcher
9 September 1989	Aberdeen	H	1–0	40,283	Johnston
16 September 1989	Dundee	H	2–2	35,836	McCoist (2)
23 September 1989	Dunfermline Athletic	A	1–1	17,765	McCoist
30 September 1989	Heart of Midlothian	H	1–0	39,554	Johnston
3 October 1989	Motherwell	A	0–1	17,667	
14 October 1989	Dundee United	H	2–1	36,062	Johnston, McCoist
25 October 1989	St Mirren	A	2–0	15,130	McCoist, Johnston
28 October 1989	Hibernian	H	3–0	35,260	McCoist (2), Johnston (pen.)
4 November 1989	Celtic	H	1–0	41,598	Johnston
18 November 1989	Dundee	A	2–0	14,536	Johnston, Walters
22 November 1989	Aberdeen	A	0–1	22,500	
25 November 1989	Dunfermline Athletic	H	3–0	39,131	Johnston, Butcher, McCoist
2 December 1989	Heart of Midlothian	A	2–1	24,771	Walters, Steven
9 December 1989	Motherwell	H	3–0	33,549	Butcher, McCoist, Brown
16 December 1989	Dundee United	A	1–1	15,947	Johnston
23 December 1989	St Mirren	H	1–0	31,797	Dodds
30 December 1989	Hibernian	A	0–0	24,500	
2 January 1990	Celtic	A	1–0	54,000	Spackman
6 January 1990	Aberdeen	H	2–0	41,351	Walters, McCoist
13 January 1990	Dundee	H	3–0	36,993	McCoist, Dodds, Johnston
27 January 1990	Dunfermline Athletic	A	1–0	17,380	Steven
3 February 1990	Dundee United	H	3–1	39,058	Walters, McCoist, Johnston
10 February 1990	Motherwell	A	1–1	17,647	Johnston
17 February 1990	Heart of Midlothian	H	0–0	41,884	
3 March 1990	Dundee	A	2–2	12,743	Johnston, Dodds
17 March 1990	St Mirren	A	0–0	16,129	
24 March 1990	Hibernian	H	0–1	37,452	
1 April 1990	Celtic	H	3–0	41,926	Walters (pen.), McCoist, Johnston (pen.)
8 April 1990	Aberdeen	A	0–0	23,000	
14 April 1990	Motherwell	H	2–1	39,305	Steven, Johnston
21 April 1990	Dundee United	A	1–0	15,995	Steven
28 April 1990	Dunfermline Athletic	H	2–0	40,769	McCoist, Dodds
5 May 1990	Heart of Midlothian	A	1–1	20,283	Munro

=== Scottish League Cup ===
Date	Round	Opponent	Venue	Result	Attendance	Scorers
15 August 1989	R2	Arbroath	H	4–0	31,762	McCoist (3), I.Ferguson
23 August 1989	R3	Greenock Morton	A	2–1	11,821	Walters, Pickering (o.g.)
30 August 1989	QF	Hamilton Academical	A	3–0	9,162	Walters (2), Steven
19 September 1989	SF	Dunfermline Athletic	N	5–0	41,643	Steven, Johnston, Walters, McCoist, I.Ferguson
22 October 1989	F	Aberdeen	N	1–2*	61,190	Walters (pen.)

*Aberdeen won the match 2–1 in extra-time

=== Scottish Cup ===
Date	Round	Opponent	Venue	Result	Attendance	Scorers
20 January 1990	R3	St Johnstone	H	3–0	39,003	Johnston, Brown, Walters
25 February 1990	R4	Celtic	A	0–1	52,565	

=== European Cup ===
Date	Round	Opponent	Venue	Result	Attendance	Scorers
13 September 1989	R1	(Germany) Bayern Munich	H	1–3	40,253	Walters (pen.)
27 September 1989	R1	(Germany) Bayern Munich	A	0–0	40,000	

== Appearances ==
Player	Position	Appearances	Goals
(Israel) Bonni Ginzburg	GK	8	0
(England) Chris Woods	GK	37	0
(Scotland) John Brown	DF	30	2
(England) Terry Butcher	DF	43	0
(Scotland) Tom Cowan	DF	4	0
(Scotland) Richard Gough	DF	31	0
(Scotland) Stuart Munro	DF	45	1
(Scotland) Scott Nisbet	DF	9	0
(England) Gary Stevens	DF	44	1
(England) Chris Vinnicombe	DF	9	0
(Scotland) Neale Cooper	MF	3	0
(Scotland) Derek Ferguson	MF	8	0
(Scotland) Ian Ferguson	MF	32	2
(Scotland) Ian McCall	MF	5	0
(Scotland) Sandy Robertson	MF	1	0
(Scotland) Graeme Souness	MF	1	0
(England) Nigel Spackman	MF	23	1
(England) Trevor Steven	MF	43	3
(England) Mark Walters	MF	36	12
(England) Ray Wilkins	MF	22	0
(Scotland) Davie Dodds	FW	15	4
(England) Kevin Drinkell	FW	7	0
(Scotland) Mo Johnston	FW	45	17
(Scotland) Ally McCoist	FW	40	18

== League table ==
Pos	Team	Pld	W	D	L	GF	GA	GD	Pts	Qualification or relegation
1	Rangers (C)	36	20	11	5	48	19	+29	51	Qualification for the European Cup first round
2	Aberdeen	36	17	10	9	56	33	+23	44	Qualification for the Cup Winners' Cup first round
3	Heart of Midlothian	36	16	12	8	54	35	+19	44	Qualification for the UEFA Cup first round
4	Dundee United	36	11	13	12	36	39	−3	35	Qualification for the UEFA Cup first round
5	Celtic	36	10	14	12	37	37	0	34	

Source: RSSSF
Rules for classification: 1) points; 2) goal difference; 3) number of goals scored.
(C) Champions

== See also ==
- 1989–90 in Scottish football
- 1989–90 Scottish Cup
- 1989–90 Scottish League Cup
- 1989–90 European Cup
- Nine in a row
