= Rangers F.C. 2–2 Celtic F.C. (1987) =

Rangers 2–2 Celtic
- Event: 1987–88 Scottish Premier Division
Rangers	Celtic
2	2
- Date: 17 October 1987
- Venue: Ibrox Stadium, Glasgow
- Referee: Jim Duncan
- Attendance: 43,486
- Weather: Sunny

On 17 October 1987, Rangers faced Celtic in a Scottish Premier Division fixture at Ibrox Stadium, during the 1987–88 season. The match finished 2–2, but is best remembered for the sending off of three players and the subsequent court case that took place as a result.

An altercation after 17 minutes between Celtic's Frank McAvennie and Rangers goalkeeper Chris Woods resulted in both being red carded. Rangers defenders Terry Butcher and Graham Roberts were also involved, with Butcher receiving a yellow card for dissent. Roberts took over as Rangers goalkeeper for the rest of the match. On 33 minutes Andy Walker scored to put Celtic ahead, and two minutes later an own goal by Butcher doubled Celtic's lead. Rangers went down to nine men in the second half when Butcher was sent off for a foul on Celtic's Allen McKnight. Despite their disadvantage, Rangers rallied and pulled a goal back through Ally McCoist. An unlikely comeback was completed by Rangers when Richard Gough equalised in the final minute. Amidst the celebrating Rangers supporters, Graham Roberts was seen to wave towards the fans, as if he was "conducting" their singing; songs which included sectarian chants. Three days later, the Procurator Fiscal ordered a police enquiry into the events of the match.

The Rangers trio of Woods, Butcher and Roberts, and Celtic's McAvennie, were later charged with breach of the peace and appeared at court. After a trial lasting several days, Butcher and Woods were convicted and fined, Roberts was found not proven and McAvennie was found not guilty.

== Details ==
17 October 1987
15:00 BST

Rangers	2–2	Celtic
McCoist 65'; Gough 90'	Report	Walker 33'; Butcher 35' (o.g.)

Ibrox Stadium, Glasgow
Attendance: 43,486
Referee: Jim Duncan

Rangers	Celtic

GK	1	(England) Chris Woods	(red card) 19'
RB	2	(Scotland) Richard Gough
LB	3	(England) Jimmy Phillips
CB	4	(England) Graham Roberts
MF	5	(Scotland) Derek Ferguson
CB	6	(England) Terry Butcher	(yellow card) 19' (yellow-red card) 62'
MF	7	(England) Trevor Francis		(substituted off) 76'
CF	8	(England) Mark Falco		(substituted off) 45'
CF	9	(Scotland) Ally McCoist
MF	10	(Scotland) Ian Durrant
MF	11	(Scotland) John McGregor
Substitutes:
MF	12	(Israel) Avi Cohen		(substituted in) 45'
LW	14	(Scotland) Davie Cooper		(substituted in) 76'
Manager:
(Scotland) Graeme Souness

GK	1	(Northern Ireland) Allen McKnight
RB	2	(Republic of Ireland) Chris Morris
LB	3	(Scotland) Derek Whyte		(substituted off) 74'
CB	4	(Scotland) Roy Aitken
CB	5	(Republic of Ireland) Mick McCarthy
CM	6	(Scotland) Peter Grant
RM	7	(Scotland) Billy Stark
CM	8	(Scotland) Paul McStay
CF	9	(Scotland) Frank McAvennie	(red card) 19'
CF	10	(Scotland) Andy Walker
LM	11	(Scotland) Tommy Burns		(substituted off) 78'
Substitutes:
LB	12	(Northern Ireland) Anton Rogan		(substituted in) 74'
LW	13	(Scotland) Owen Archdeacon		(substituted in) 78'
Manager:
(Scotland) Billy McNeill

== See also ==
- Old Firm
