= Colin West =

English footballer (born 1962)

Personal information
- Full name: Colin West
- Date of birth: 13 November 1962 (age 64)
- Place of birth: Wallsend, England
- Height: 6 ft 0 in (1.83 m)
- Position: Forward

Youth career
- 1979–1980: Sunderland

Senior career*
Years	Team	Apps	(Gls)
1980–1985	Sunderland	102	(21)
1985–1986	Watford	45	(20)
1986–1987	Rangers	10	(2)
1987–1989	Sheffield Wednesday	45	(8)
1989–1992	West Bromwich Albion	73	(22)
1991	→ Port Vale (loan)	5	(1)
1992–1993	Swansea City	33	(12)
1993–1998	Leyton Orient	142	(42)
1997	→ Northampton Town (loan)	2	(0)
1998	→ Rushden & Diamonds (loan)	5	(3)
1998–1999	Rushden & Diamonds	29	(6)
1999–2000	Northwich Victoria	1	(0)
2000–2001	Hartlepool United	1	(0)
Total		493	(136)

Managerial career
- 2002: Hartlepool United (caretaker)
- 2007: Millwall (caretaker)
- * Club domestic league appearances and goals

Colin West (born 13 November 1962) is an English former footballer. He played as a forward and scored 158 goals in 555 league and cup games in the English Football League, Conference and the Scottish Football League.

He began his career at Sunderland in 1981, playing more than 100 games for the Black Cats before moving on to Watford in March 1985. He was sold to Rangers the following year for £180,000. However, he only occasionally appeared as Rangers won the Scottish Football League Premier Division title during the 1986–87 season. He returned to England with Sheffield Wednesday in September 1987 for a fee of £150,000. Two years later, he signed with West Bromwich Albion before he joined Swansea City in August 1992, following a loan spell at Port Vale. He moved on to Leyton Orient in July 1993 and spent five years at the club. In 1997, he was loaned out to Northampton Town before he switched clubs to Conference club Rushden & Diamonds. The next year, he signed with Northwich Victoria before signing with Hartlepool United in 2000. After retiring in 2001, he spent the next ten years coaching at various clubs, including Hartlepool United, Sheffield Wednesday, Stockport County, Millwall, Southend United, Notts County, Carlisle United and Northampton Town. He served Hartlepool United and Millwall as caretaker manager. He later worked as an assistant manager at Hartlepool United.

== Playing career ==
=== Sunderland ===
West turned professional in July 1980 and made his debut for Sunderland on 17 October 1981 against Tottenham Hotspur in a 2–0 defeat at Roker Park under manager Alan Durban. The club narrowly avoided relegation out of the First Division in 1981–82 under new boss Alan Durban, finishing just one place and two points above relegated Leeds United. They then finished four places and three points above the drop in 1982–83. West was the club's top scorer in 1983–84 with nine goals. The next season, he scored three goals over the two legs in the League Cup semi-final win over Chelsea but was left out of the Wembley final by manager Len Ashurst. Following this snub, he joined league rivals Watford for £115,000 in March 1985. The "Black Cats" went on to lose their top-flight status in 1984–85, finishing two places and ten points short of safety. He scored 28 goals in 122 competitive appearances for Sunderland.

=== Watford, Rangers and Sheffield Wednesday ===
Following his arrival at Watford, West helped the club to a mid-table finish in the league. He was then the club's top scorer in 1985–86 with 16 goals. He hit 23 goals in 56 league and cup appearances for Graham Taylor's Watford. In May 1986, he became new Rangers' player-manager Graeme Souness's first signing when he moved to Scotland for a £175,000 fee. However, a serious knee injury sustained in only his fourth game restricted his impact at Ibrox, but he did manage to play 12 games in the title-winning 1986–87 campaign, scoring three goals. He returned to England to sign with First Division side Sheffield Wednesday for £150,000 in September 1987. The club finished eleventh in 1987–88 under Howard Wilkinson's stewardship before heading into a relegation dogfight under Peter Eustace in 1988–89. West made 57 league and cup appearances at Wednesday, scoring 13 goals.

=== West Bromwich Albion ===
He signed with Second Division side West Bromwich Albion in exchange for Carlton Palmer in February 1989. He was unable to fire Brian Talbot's side into the play-offs in 1988–89, as they ended up two places and four points short of their target. The "Baggies" dropped to 20th in 1989–90 and were just two places and three points above relegated AFC Bournemouth. The 1990–91 season was a disaster, and West Brom were relegated to the Third Division for the first time in their history. Not highly rated at the Hawthorns, he made 73 league appearances, scoring 22 goals, during his stay in the West Midlands. He joined Second Division club Port Vale on loan in November 1991, making five appearances and scoring one goal for John Rudge's side.

=== Swansea City ===
He was signed by Swansea City manager Frank Burrows in August 1992 and scored two goals in his first start for the club in a 2–0 win over former side Port Vale. He went on to score 12 goals in 33 Second Division appearances, as the "Swans" reached the play-offs in 1992–93, only to be sent off for fouling Ian Hamilton during a 2–0 defeat by his former club West Bromwich Albion in the second leg of the semi-finals, which left Swansea with a 3–2 aggregate loss. West later said that "I instantly thought 'why on earth did I do that?' but the referee rightly sent me off. It was a very sad way for me to end my time with the club."

=== Leyton Orient ===
West switched to Second Division rivals Leyton Orient in July 1993, who were then managed by his former boss, Peter Eustace. The "O's" finished 18th in 1993–94, before being relegated in last place in 1994–95. The club struggled in the fourth tier and posted a 21st-place finish in 1995–96 under Pat Holland, three positions above Torquay United, the English Football League's bottom club. He scored five goals in 26 appearances in 1996–97, as Orient moved up to 16th under Tommy Taylor's stewardship. He made 142 league appearances for Leyton Orient, scoring 42 goals. In September 1997, he joined Second Division side Northampton Town on loan but made just two goalless appearances for Ian Atkins' "Cobblers". Two months later, he was loaned out to Rushden & Diamonds of the Conference, in a move that reunited him with former manager Brian Talbot and helped to fire the "Diamonds" to a fourth-place finish in 1997–98. The loan was made into a permanent transfer.

=== Later career ===
West permanently signed with Rushden & Diamonds for the 1998–99 season and helped the club to another fourth-place finish. He scored two goals against Doncaster Rovers in an FA Cup replay to secure Rushden a tie with Leeds United at Nene Park in the next round. His contract was cancelled by mutual consent in September 1999. He moved on to Mark Gardiner's Conference strugglers Northwich Victoria in the 1999–2000 campaign, before ending his career at Hartlepool United, where he made just a single appearance in 1999–2000.

== Style of play ==
West was a forward who was "powerful in the air and determined on the ground".

== Coaching career ==
When West joined Hartlepool United in November 1999, he was appointed as assistant manager to Chris Turner. The pair helped the club avoid falling into the Conference when they arrived, before they led the club to three successive Third Division play-offs. However, they never made it past the semi-finals. When Turner left the club to take over as manager of Sheffield Wednesday in November 2002, West briefly took charge of the first-team on a caretaker basis. After a win and a draw, West left to team up with Turner at Hillsborough, and later followed him to Stockport County, before the pair left Edgeley Park in December 2005.

He then spent time as reserve team coach at Millwall, being appointed assistant caretaker manager to Richard Shaw after Willie Donachie was dismissed. He later took up the reserve team coaching position at Southend United in December 2008. Three months later, with Turner back in charge at "Pools" on a caretaker basis, West left the position at Southend to return to Hartlepool as assistant coach. He left Hartlepool again in June 2010 after the club chose not to renew his contract. In February 2012, Notts County manager Keith Curle recruited West to work as a coach. He left the club a year later, when Curle was sacked. He was appointed assistant manager at Carlisle United when Curle took charge of the club in September 2014. The pair left Brunton Park at the end of the 2017–18 season. On 1 October 2018, Curle was appointed as Northampton Town, and again hired West as his assistant. The pair were sacked on 10 February 2021.

In July 2021, he re-united with Curle after being named assistant head coach at Oldham Athletic. Curle and West both left Oldham on 24 November 2021 with the club sitting in 22nd-position in League Two. West rejoined Hartlepool United as assistant manager on 18 September 2022, once again alongside Keith Curle, who was appointed interim manager on the same day. On 22 February 2023, Curle and West were sacked.

== Career statistics ==
=== Playing statistics ===
Appearances and goals by club, season and competition
Club	Season	League			National cup (Note: Includes FA Cup, Scottish Cup)		Other		Total	
Club	Season	Division	Apps	Goals	Apps	Goals	Apps	Goals	Apps	Goals
Sunderland	1981–82	First Division	18	6	0	0	1	0	19	6
Sunderland	1982–83	First Division	23	3	1	0	3	0	27	3
Sunderland	1983–84	First Division	38	9	2	2	4	2	44	13
Sunderland	1984–85	First Division	23	3	1	0	8	3	32	6
Sunderland	Total		102	21	4	2	16	5	122	28
Watford	1984–85	First Division	12	7	0	0	0	0	12	7
Watford	1985–86	First Division	33	13	8	3	3	0	44	16
Watford	Total		45	20	8	3	3	0	56	23
Rangers	1986–87	Scottish Premier Division	9	2	1	0	2	1	12	3
Rangers	1987–88	Scottish Premier Division	1	0	0	0	0	0	1	0
Rangers	Total		10	2	1	0	2	1	13	3
Sheffield Wednesday	1987–88	First Division	25	7	4	1	7	4	36	12
Sheffield Wednesday	1988–89	First Division	20	1	2	0	2	0	24	1
Sheffield Wednesday	Total		45	8	6	1	9	4	60	13
West Bromwich Albion	1988–89	Second Division	17	8	0	0	0	0	17	8
West Bromwich Albion	1989–90	Second Division	21	4	3	0	1	0	25	4
West Bromwich Albion	1990–91	Second Division	28	8	1	1	2	0	31	9
West Bromwich Albion	1991–92	Third Division	4	1	0	0	1	1	5	2
West Bromwich Albion	1992–93	Third Division	3	1	0	0	0	0	3	1
West Bromwich Albion	Total		73	22	4	1	4	1	81	24
Port Vale (loan)	1991–92	Second Division	5	1	0	0	0	0	5	1
Swansea City	1992–93	Second Division	33	12	5	2	6	1	44	15
Leyton Orient	1993–94	Second Division	43	14	2	0	3	0	48	14
Leyton Orient	1994–95	Second Division	30	9	2	1	7	4	39	14
Leyton Orient	1995–96	Third Division	39	16	1	0	1	1	41	17
Leyton Orient	1996–97	Third Division	23	3	2	1	3	1	28	5
Leyton Orient	1997–98	Third Division	7	0	0	0	1	0	8	0
Leyton Orient	Total		142	42	7	2	15	6	164	50
Northampton Town (loan)	1997–98	Second Division	2	0	0	0	0	0	2	0
Rushden & Diamonds	1997–98	Conference	15	6	0	0	0	0	15	6
Rushden & Diamonds	1998–99	Conference	15	3	6	3	6	4	27	10
Rushden & Diamonds	1999–2000	Conference	4	0	0	0	0	0	4	0
Rushden & Diamonds	Total		34	9	6	3	6	4	46	16
Northwich Victoria	1999–2000	Conference	1	0	0	0	0	0	1	0
Hartlepool United	1999–2000	Third Division	1	0	0	0	1	0	2	0
Career total			493	137	41	14	62	22	596	173

=== Managerial statistics ===
Managerial record by team and tenure
Team	From	To	Record				
Team	From	To	P	W	D	L	Win %
Hartlepool United (caretaker)	7 November 2002	21 November 2002	2	1	1	0	50.0
Millwall (caretaker)	8 October 2007	7 November 2007	5	1	2	2	20.0
Total			7	2	3	2	28.6

== Honours ==
Rangers

- Scottish Football League Premier Division: 1986–87
