= Lindsay Hamilton =

Scottish footballer

Personal information
- Date of birth: 11 August 1962 (age 64)
- Place of birth: Bellshill, Scotland
- Position: Goalkeeper

Senior career*
Years	Team	Apps	(Gls)
1982–1987	Stenhousemuir	120	(0)
1987–1990	Rangers	0	(0)
1988	→ East Stirlingshire (loan)	1	(0)
1989	→ Stirling Albion (loan)	4	(0)
1990	→ Clydebank (loan)	1	(0)
1990	→ Leeds United	0	(0)
1990–1992	St Johnstone	77	(0)
1992–1994	Dunfermline Athletic	66	(0)
1994–1995	Portadown	27	(0)
1995–1997	East Fife	65	(0)
1997–1998	Queen's Park	24	(0)
1998	→ Partick Thistle (loan)	5	(0)
1998–2000	Stenhousemuir	67	(0)
- * Club domestic league appearances and goals

Lindsay Hamilton (born 11 August 1962) is a Scottish former professional footballer who left his position as the goalkeeping coach at East Fife.

Hamilton had a long and distinguished career, lasting from 1982 to 2000 in which he made close to 500 first team appearances.

== Career ==
=== Stenhousemuir ===
In December 1982 Stenhousemuir signed Hamilton from junior side Thorniewood United. He made his debut at Ochilview Park on Boxing Day in a 1–0 home defeat by Forfar Athletic. He played three more times that season and had his first shut-out in the last match of the season at Ochilview, helping the home side to a 0–0 draw against champions Brechin City. That ended a league run of 29 consecutive scoring games for Brechin.

=== Rangers ===
He took over as regular stopper at the start of 1983–84 and his consistent performances earned him a move to Rangers in November 1986. Hamilton never played for the first team in what is usually recognised as a first class match (league, domestic cups, Europe), spending his time as number three in the hierarchy behind Chris Woods and Nicky Walker (later Bonni Ginzburg) and spent loan periods at East Stirlingshire, Stirling Albion, Clydebank and Leeds United (he never featured for the last-named).

But he did make a few appearances for what can be loosely described as the first eleven. In a Glasgow Cup game versus Clyde at Firhill in April 1987, he played his part to help Rangers win on penalties. He played before a five-figure crowd in a friendly against Kilmarnock at Rugby Park and made a few other appearances in testimonial and charity games, most notably coming on as a substitute for Chris Woods against Gretna in the benefit match for the Lockerbie Disaster Fund in January 1989.

=== Later career ===
Lindsay finally tasted action in the top flight when he signed for St Johnstone in the close season in 1990 and spent the next two seasons as a Premier Division regular before moving on to Dunfermline in 1992.

He left the Pars for Portadown in Northern Ireland in 1994 and played in the team that won the Budweiser Cup before returning to Scotland and East Fife in 1995. He was a regular in the team that won promotion to the First Division in 1995–96 and in the side which were relegated the following season.

His next port of call was Queen's Park though he played a few times on loan for Partick Thistle in 1997–98 as well. After that it was back to his first club, Stenhousemuir and another promotion-winning campaign in 1998–99. His final season was at Ochilview in 1999–2000 helping Stenny survive in the Second Division. His final appearance was in a 2–2 home draw against Ross County on 6 May 2000.
