= Allen McKnight =

Northern Irish footballer (born 1964)

Personal information
- Full name: Allen Darrell McKnight
- Date of birth: 27 January 1964 (age 62)
- Place of birth: Antrim, Northern Ireland
- Height: 6 ft 1 in (1.85 m)
- Position: Goalkeeper

Youth career
- Crumlin Boys
- Crumlin Rec.
- Chimney Corner

Senior career*
Years	Team	Apps	(Gls)
1984–1986	Distillery	68	(0)
1986–1988	Celtic	12	(0)
1986–1987	→ Albion Rovers (loan)	36	(0)
1988–1991	West Ham United	23	(0)
1991	Airdrieonians	2	(0)
1991	Stockport County	0	(0)
1991	Rotherham United	3	(0)
1991–1992	Walsall	8	(0)
1992–1994	South China	?	(?)
1994	Exeter City	10	(0)
1994–1995	Collier Row	?	(?)
1995–1996	Romford	23	(0)
1996–1997	Collier Row & Romford	19	(0)
Total		162	(0)

International career
1987–1989	Northern Ireland	10	(0)
- * Club domestic league appearances and goals

Allen Darrell McKnight (born 27 January 1964) is a Northern Irish former international footballer who played professionally in Northern Ireland, Scotland, England, and Hong Kong as a goalkeeper.

== Club career ==
Born in Antrim, McKnight played youth football for a number of local clubs including Crumlin Boys, Crumlin Rec., and Chimney Corner.

He began his senior career in 1984 with Distillery, and he also played for Celtic, Albion Rovers, West Ham United, Airdrieonians, Stockport County, Rotherham United, Walsall, South China and Exeter City.

=== Celtic ===
McKnight signed for Celtic in August 1986, joining up again with his former Distillery teammate Anton Rogan who had arrived at Parkhead a few months earlier. He did not feature in any first-team games in his first year, and was loaned out to Albion Rovers to gain experience of the Scottish game. With the departure of Peter Latchford in the summer of 1987, McKnight rose up in the pecking order at Celtic to second-choice keeper, behind first choice Pat Bonner. McKnight played several games for Celtic at the start of season 1987–88 in place of Bonner who had contracted a virus. He made his debut in a 5–1 win away to Dumbarton in a league cup tie on 26 August 1987 and went on to play in three Old firm league games, a 1–0 win at Parkhead, a 2–2 draw at Ibrox and a 2–0 win in the New Year game at Parkhead. Bonner regained his place in the team upon his recovery from illness, but McKnight's 12 league appearances and 5 clean sheets helped the club to win the League Championship. An injury to Bonner in May 1988 saw McKnight play in the 1988 Scottish Cup Final against Dundee Utd, and he won another winner's medal as Celtic triumphed 2–1 at Hampden. McKnight left Parkhead for West Ham a couple of months later.

=== West Ham United ===
During his West Ham United career he was known by the fans as McKnightmare because of his frequent goalkeeping errors. Signed from Celtic in the summer of 1988 McKnight made his West Ham debut on 10 September 1988 in a 1–0 away win against Wimbledon. Competing for the goalkeeper's place with Phil Parkes, McKnight played all his 23 league games for West Ham in his first season. His last league game coming on 23 May 1989, a 5–1 away defeat to Liverpool which saw West Ham relegated to the Second Division. He had to wait eighteen months for his next game, also a 5–1 defeat, away to Luton Town in the Full Members Cup.

He later played non-league football with teams including Collier Row, Romford and Collier Row & Romford (a merger of his two previous teams).

== International career ==
McKnight earned 10 caps for Northern Ireland between 1987 and 1989.
