= Ray Wilkins =

English football player and coach (1956–2018)

Ray Wilkins MBE
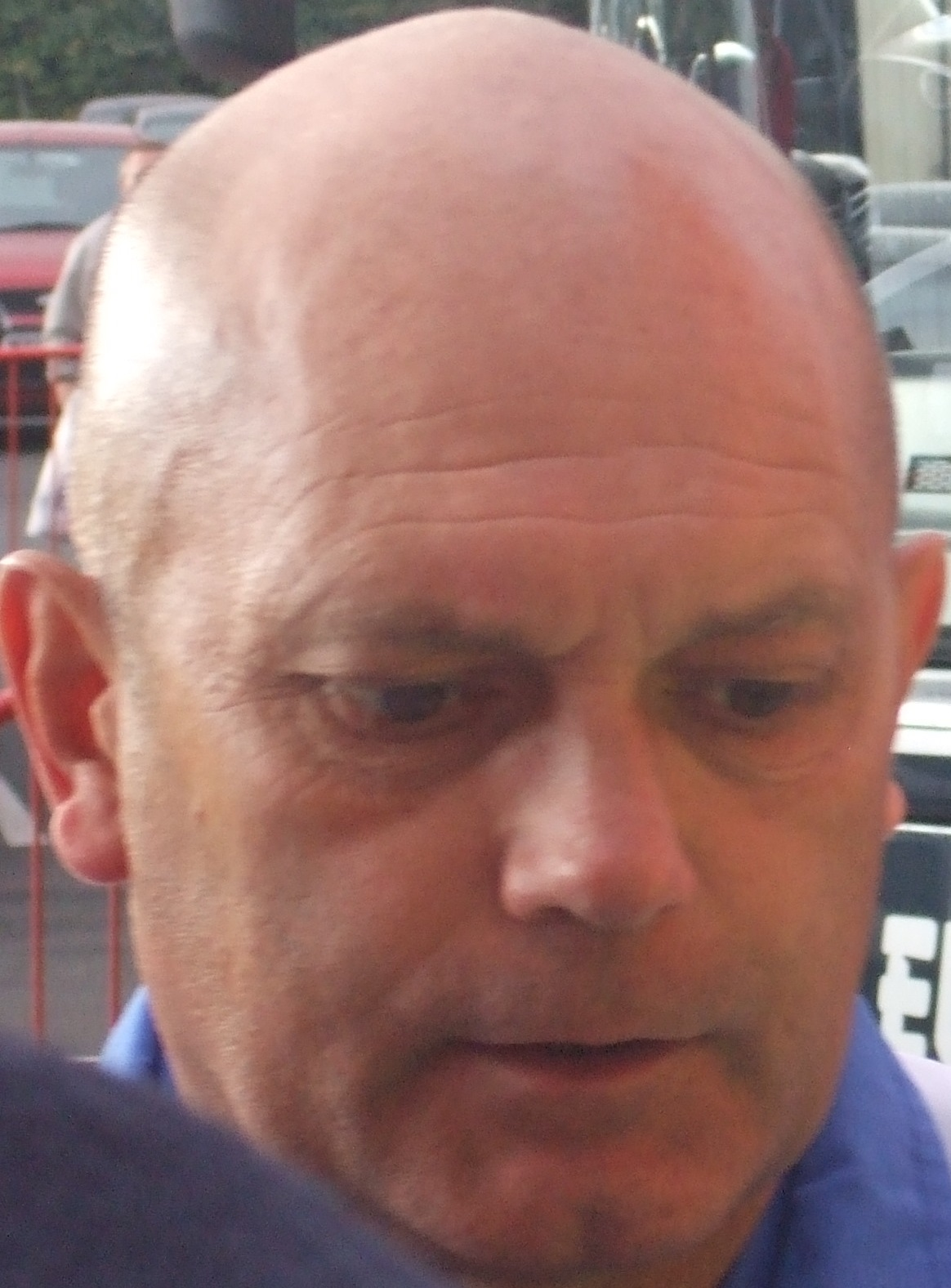
- Wilkins in 2008

Personal information
- Full name: Raymond Colin Wilkins
- Date of birth: 14 September 1956
- Place of birth: Hillingdon, England
- Date of death: 4 April 2018 (aged 61)
- Place of death: St George's Hospital, Tooting, England
- Height: 5 ft 8 in (1.73 m)
- Position: Midfielder

Youth career
- Chelsea

Senior career*
| Years | Team | Apps | (Gls) |
| 1973–1979 | Chelsea | 179 | (30) |
| 1979–1984 | Manchester United | 160 | (7) |
| 1984–1987 | AC Milan | 73 | (2) |
| 1987 | Paris Saint-Germain | 13 | (0) |
| 1987–1989 | Rangers | 70 | (2) |
| 1989–1994 | Queens Park Rangers | 154 | (7) |
| 1994 | Crystal Palace | 1 | (0) |
| 1994–1996 | Queens Park Rangers | 21 | (0) |
| 1996 | Wycombe Wanderers | 1 | (0) |
| 1996–1997 | Hibernian | 16 | (0) |
| 1997 | Millwall | 3 | (0) |
| 1997 | Leyton Orient | 3 | (0) |
| Total | | 694 | (48) |

International career
| 1972 | England Schoolboys | 7 | (0) |
| 1974 | England Youth | 6 | (3) |
| 1975–1976 | England U23 | 2 | (0) |
| 1976 | England U21 | 1 | (0) |
| 1976–1986 | England | 84 | (3) |

Managerial career
- 1994–1996: Queens Park Rangers
- 1997–1998: Fulham
- 1998–2000: Chelsea (assistant)
- 2001–2002: Watford (assistant)
- 2003–2005: Millwall (assistant)
- 2004–2007: England U21 (assistant)
- 2008–2009: Chelsea (assistant)
- 2009: Chelsea (caretaker)
- 2009–2010: Chelsea (assistant)
- 2013–2014: Fulham (assistant)
- 2014–2015: Jordan
- 2015: Aston Villa (assistant)
- * Club domestic league appearances and goals

Raymond Colin Wilkins MBE (14 September 1956 – 4 April 2018) was an English football player and coach.

Born into a footballing family with his father and three brothers involved in the game, Wilkins played as a midfielder. He began his career at Chelsea, where he was appointed captain at the age of 18, and later played for clubs including Manchester United, AC Milan, Queens Park Rangers and Rangers. He won 84 caps for the England national football team from 1976 to 1986, playing at UEFA Euro 1980 and the 1982 and 1986 FIFA World Cups.

Overall, he made over 1,000 appearances in his career.

After his playing career ended, he worked as a television pundit, and as a coach and manager with Queens Park Rangers, Fulham and Chelsea. He managed Jordan at the 2015 AFC Asian Cup and his last coaching job was as the assistant manager of Aston Villa later that year.

== Club career ==
=== Early career ===
Born in Hillingdon, Middlesex, Wilkins started his career with the Sunday League team Senrab that play in Wanstead Flats, East London.

=== Chelsea ===
Wilkins made his name in the 1970s with boyhood club Chelsea, which he joined as an apprentice, progressing to his first team debut against Norwich City at the age of 17 on 26 October 1973 as a substitute in a 3–0 home league win.

In 1975, following the club's relegation and the departure of many established players, an 18-year-old Wilkins was handed the captaincy of Chelsea by new manager Eddie McCreadie, taking it from long-time Blues captain John Hollins. He took to the role well, keeping it for four years. He emerged as Chelsea's key player of that period, leading a team of mainly young players to promotion again in 1976–1977 and, in the next season, consolidation of their place in the First Division.

His elder brother, Graham Wilkins also played for Chelsea.

=== Manchester United ===
In 1979, after Chelsea were relegated, Wilkins signed for Manchester United for a fee of £825,000, the highest fee received for a Chelsea player at the time. He scored ten goals in his five years with the Red Devils, including a long-range strike in the 2–2 draw with Brighton & Hove Albion in the 1983 FA Cup Final (United won the replay).

He was voted player of the year by the team's supporters at the end of the 1983–1984 season. His midfield performances drew the attention of Milan, who made United a £1.5 million offer for the player.

=== Milan, Paris and Rangers ===
Wilkins signed with Milan in summer 1984. He later remarked that the most difficult part of adapting to the Italian game was the focus on fitness – the coaching staff made him work to reduce his body fat levels and Wilkins described the result as being in the best shape of his career. The Italian team was struggling during this period, having suffered relegation in the 1981–82 Serie A season, and Wilkins was joined by fellow Englishman Mark Hateley (himself replacing another compatriot — Luther Blissett). The only foreign players in the squad, the pair helped the team to victory over rivals Inter Milan in the Milan Derby that October, winning plaudits from Italian press and the club's fans. In his first year there, Wilkins played 28 Serie A games to bring the team to fifth in the league and also won a runner-up medal in the Coppa Italia (having eliminated Inter in the semis).

The following season he remained a key player in Milan's midfield, appearing in 29 league games and scoring two goals – one late goal to salvage a draw at Avellino and another goal the following game against Sampdoria. These were the only Serie A goals of his career. Overall, the team struggled for goals, with Pietro Paolo Virdis's total of 13 making him the club's only goalscorer in double figures that year. The club also suffered off the pitch, with owner Giuseppe Farina absconding to South Africa following accusations of bribery and theft.

In Wilkins' final season there (1986–1987), he fell out of the first team structure, following the signing of Roberto Donadoni and the continued presence of both Agostino Di Bartolomei and Alberigo Evani. The team finished fifth in the league, beating Inter twice, in Silvio Berlusconi's first year as owner. Wilkins played 105 games (74 in Serie A) for Milan between 1984 and 1987. Corriere della Sera eulogised him as a "serious and meticulous professional who was immediately appreciated for his long and precise passes".

Wilkins signed for Paris Saint-Germain in the middle of 1987, but this proved to be short-lived: he failed to break into the team ahead of Gabriel Calderón and Safet Sušić so he eagerly took the option to move to Scotland to sign for Rangers for £250,000 that November.

He made his debut for Rangers on 28 November 1987 in a 3–2 win over Hearts at Ibrox. He became an integral part of the team for the rest of the season, making twenty-nine appearances, which included both legs of the European Cup quarter-final against Steaua Bucharest. However, it would be the following season he would truly make his mark at Rangers. Reigning Scottish champions, and Old Firm rivals, Celtic played Rangers on 27 August 1988. With the score tied at 1–1, Wilkins scored a "thunderous volley" from the edge of the penalty box to put Rangers ahead, and his side eventually recorded an emphatic 5–1 win that day over their rivals. Rangers went on to win the league title that season, the first of their eventual nine-in-a-row. Wilkins also played in Rangers' win over Aberdeen in the 1988 Scottish League Cup Final. He remained an important team member into season 1988–89, playing in almost every game for the first half of the season, but his family wished to return to London. As such, he left Rangers in December 1989 to sign for Queens Park Rangers. Following his last appearance for the Glasgow side, Wilkins received a standing ovation from the 40,000 crowd. Despite only playing two seasons for the club, he was later inducted into their Hall of Fame.

=== Later career ===
The longest stint of his late career was at Queens Park Rangers, for whom he was a regular first team player from November 1989 to 1994, including the team's first two Premier League seasons. He made his debut in the 3–0 away win versus Crystal Palace. Wilkins left QPR in the summer of 1994 on a free transfer to join Crystal Palace as a player-coach under manager Alan Smith, but only made one appearance due to breaking his left foot on his debut.

Wilkins re-joined QPR as player-manager on 15 November 1994, following the exit of Gerry Francis. The rest of that season was a success with the team finishing eighth in the Premiership. However the close season of 1995 saw the departure of Les Ferdinand to Newcastle and the following season the team struggled and were relegated. As player-manager, he appeared in a further 21 games for the club from 1994 to 1996. Wilkins left QPR by mutual agreement in September 1996 after the club was bought by media tycoon Chris Wright following their relegation from the FA Premier League.

Wilkins played for four clubs in the 1996–1997 season. He played one game at Wycombe Wanderers before moving to Hibernian for a 16-game stint. Toward the end of the season he played three times for Millwall in the Second Division and, finally, three Third Division games for Leyton Orient before retiring.

== International career ==
Wilkins scored three goals in 84 games for England, captained the team on ten occasions, and played at the 1982 and 1986 World Cups. Wilkins was called up to play for England for the first time in 1976 by coach Don Revie, then made his debut on 28 May in a 3–2 win over Italy at the U.S.A. Bicentennial Cup Tournament in New York.

He achieved one of his career highs after helping England qualify for the 1980 European Championships in Italy — the first tournament England had reached for a decade. During a group game against Belgium, Wilkins scored a memorable goal when he lobbed the whole Belgian defence (thereby breaching the Belgians' obvious offside trap) and delivered a second lob, this time over the head of the goalkeeper and into the net to put England ahead. The Belgians swiftly equalised, however, and England failed to progress beyond the group stage.

Wilkins was a fixture in the England squad through a successful campaign to qualify for the 1982 World Cup in Spain, which England exited at the second group stage. During the 1983–84 season, Wilkins continued to play for England under new coach Bobby Robson but the team failed to qualify for the 1984 European Championships.

Wilkins remained an England regular during his spell at Milan and he was chosen for the squad which qualified for the 1986 World Cup in Mexico. He played in the opening defeat against Portugal. Wilkins became the first Englishman to be sent off at the World Cup in a goalless draw with Morocco in 1986, for throwing the ball towards the referee Gabriel González. The ball hit González having been thrown in protest at being deemed offside. Wilkins was suspended for the next two games and was not reinstated by the time the quarter-final against Argentina came round, a game which England lost 2–1.

Wilkins made his 84th and final England appearance in November 1986, against Yugoslavia.

== Style of play and reception ==
"With Wilkins on the pitch, it sometimes feels like we are playing with 12 men."

— Nils Liedholm, on Wilkins's immense tactical influence during his tenure at AC Milan in the mid-1980s

Wilkins played primarily as a deep-lying playmaker, using his vision and passing range to dictate the tempo of the game from central midfield. Highly regarded for his elegance, composure, and extraordinary tactical intelligence on the pitch, he possessed a superlative range of skills and was particularly noted for his long-range, accurate passing. Wilkins picked up the nickname "Butch" in his early career. He was also known by the nickname "Razor" (Rasoio in Italian), a moniker coined to reflect the precise, driven, and "sharp" nature of his passes. He possessed a rare ability to calibrate these passes using the instep of his foot, a technique that was particularly uncommon in that era. Although not a prolific goalscorer, he was capable of scoring memorable and spectacular goals, such as his curling left-footed strike in the 1983 FA Cup Final and a well-timed volley for Rangers in 1988.

Wilkins began his career as a classical inside-forward, demonstrating strong leadership qualities early on. After being appointed Chelsea captain at the age of 18, he led the team back into the First Division, and was widely regarded as one of the most promising young talents in English football. Operating in midfield, he frequently sat deep to hold his position and play simple passes, encouraging his teammates to take on more creative roles. While renowned for his distribution, he was also highly effective in regaining possession, possessing an enviable positional sense and a remarkable willingness to sacrifice himself for the team. His selfless approach led to some misconceptions that he was an unimaginative player; manager Ron Atkinson famously nicknamed him "The Crab" due to his perceived habit of passing sideways. Former Manchester United forward George Best remarked that had Wilkins arrived at Old Trafford ten years earlier, he would have been recognised as one of the world's most intelligent footballers.

Throughout his career, Wilkins was a serious and meticulous professional known for his exemplary correctness. Following his death, he was universally described by former teammates, managers, and the media as an "absolute gentleman." He was respected as one of the most well-mannered and courteous figures in football, balancing his amiable personality with a fierce competitive edge and a desire for the game to be played in the right way.

== Coaching career ==
=== Early coaching career ===
Wilkins was QPR manager from 1994 to 1996, and managed fellow West London club Fulham in 1997–1998. In March 1999, Wilkins was appointed Chelsea's first-team coach after Graham Rix was jailed for child sex offences. Wilkins and Rix were Chelsea's interim managers after the sacking of Gianluca Vialli at the start of the 2000–01 FA Premier League season, but both were sacked from the club on the orders of new manager Claudio Ranieri in November 2000.

When Vialli was hired by First Division club Watford, Wilkins again assisted him until their dismissal in June 2002. From 2003 to 2005, Wilkins assisted former Chelsea player Dennis Wise in his managing of Millwall, but announced his exit when he took exception at Dave Bassett being hired in the coaching staff.

=== England U-21 ===
From 2004 on Wilkins was assistant coach to Peter Taylor with the England under-21s until Taylor left in early 2007. Wilkins was not retained by incoming head coach Stuart Pearce.

=== Return to Chelsea ===
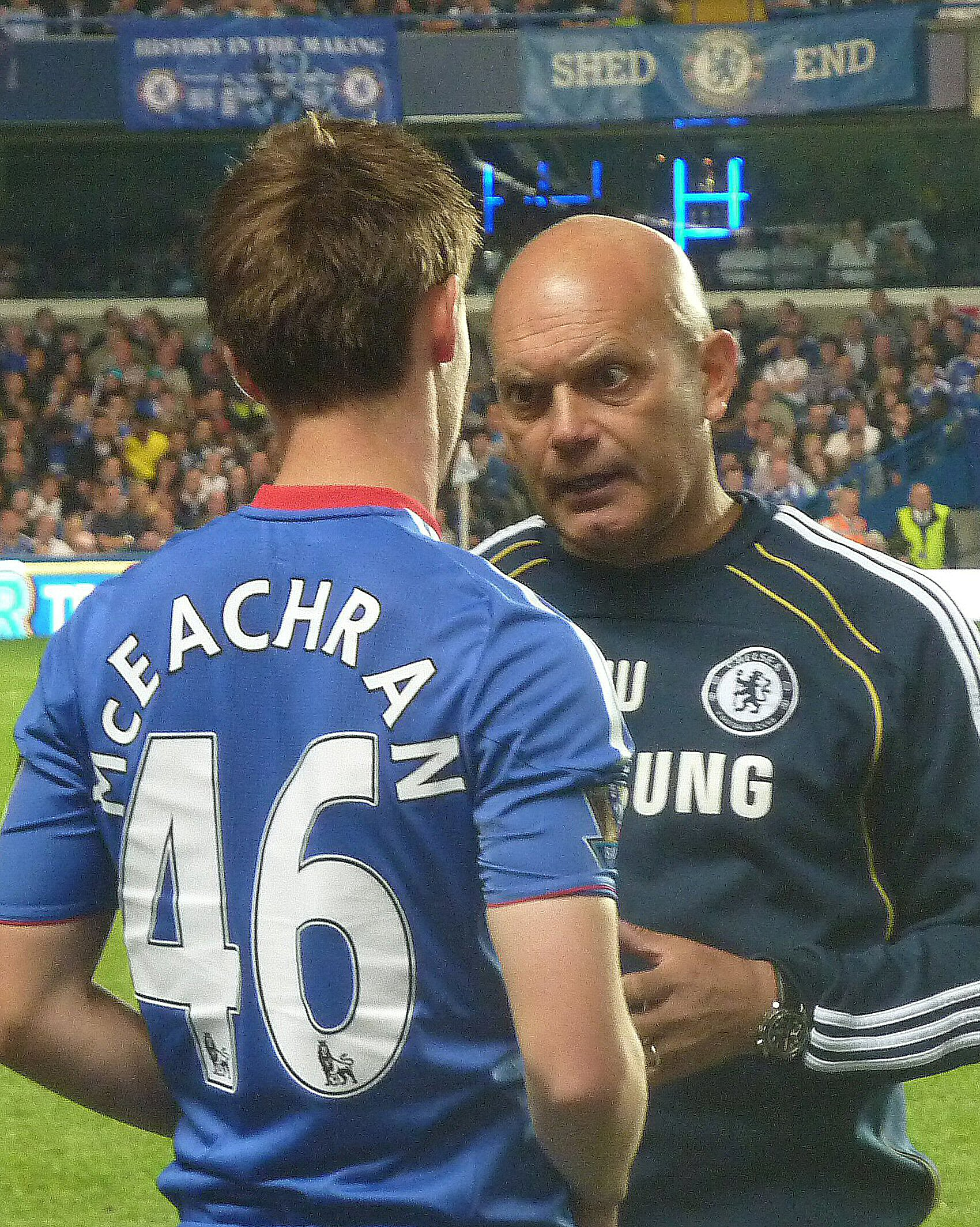
Ray Wilkins in October 2010, giving advice to Chelsea's youngster Josh McEachran

In September 2008, Wilkins was appointed assistant first team coach to Luiz Felipe Scolari at Chelsea, following Steve Clarke's departure to West Ham United. In February 2009, following Scolari's dismissal, Wilkins was appointed as Chelsea's caretaker manager for the Fifth round FA Cup tie with Watford. Chelsea won the game 3–1, through a Nicolas Anelka hat-trick, with the club's new manager Guus Hiddink watching from the stands.

On 11 November 2010, it was announced that Wilkins' contract with Chelsea "would not be renewed" and that he was to leave the club "with immediate effect". On 1 December 2010, Wilkins reached what he described as a "harmonious conclusion" with Chelsea following his unexpected departure from Stamford Bridge. While appearing as a guest on Sky Sports Champions League coverage on 7 December 2010, Wilkins said that Chelsea still had not given him a reason for his sacking.

Chelsea manager Carlo Ancelotti, who was himself dismissed at the end of the 2010–2011 season, wrote about Wilkins, in his autobiographical book The Beautiful Games of an Ordinary Genius: "Ray is one of those select few, always present, noble in spirit, a real blue-blood, Chelsea flows in his veins ... without him we wouldn't have won a thing."

=== Later coaching career ===
On 30 December 2013, Wilkins was appointed assistant head coach of Fulham. He and technical director Alan Curbishley were dismissed on 17 February 2014 and the season ended with relegation.

On 3 September 2014, Wilkins was appointed as the head coach of Jordan. He led Jordan at the 2015 AFC Asian Cup, where they were eliminated in the group-stages for the first time after two losses against Iraq and Japan and a win over Palestine.

On 25 June 2015, Aston Villa manager Tim Sherwood appointed Wilkins as his assistant manager. On 26 October 2015, Wilkins was dismissed along with Sherwood and the rest of the coaching team.

== Media ==
In the 1990s Wilkins was part of the team that contributed to the Football Italia show that aired on Channel 4. Wilkins later appeared as a commentator for Sky Sports, particularly on their Champions League coverage. He also worked for Talksport. Wilkins was also featured as a commentator on the 1990s Tango soft drink commercials, 'You know when you've been Tango'd'.

== Personal life ==
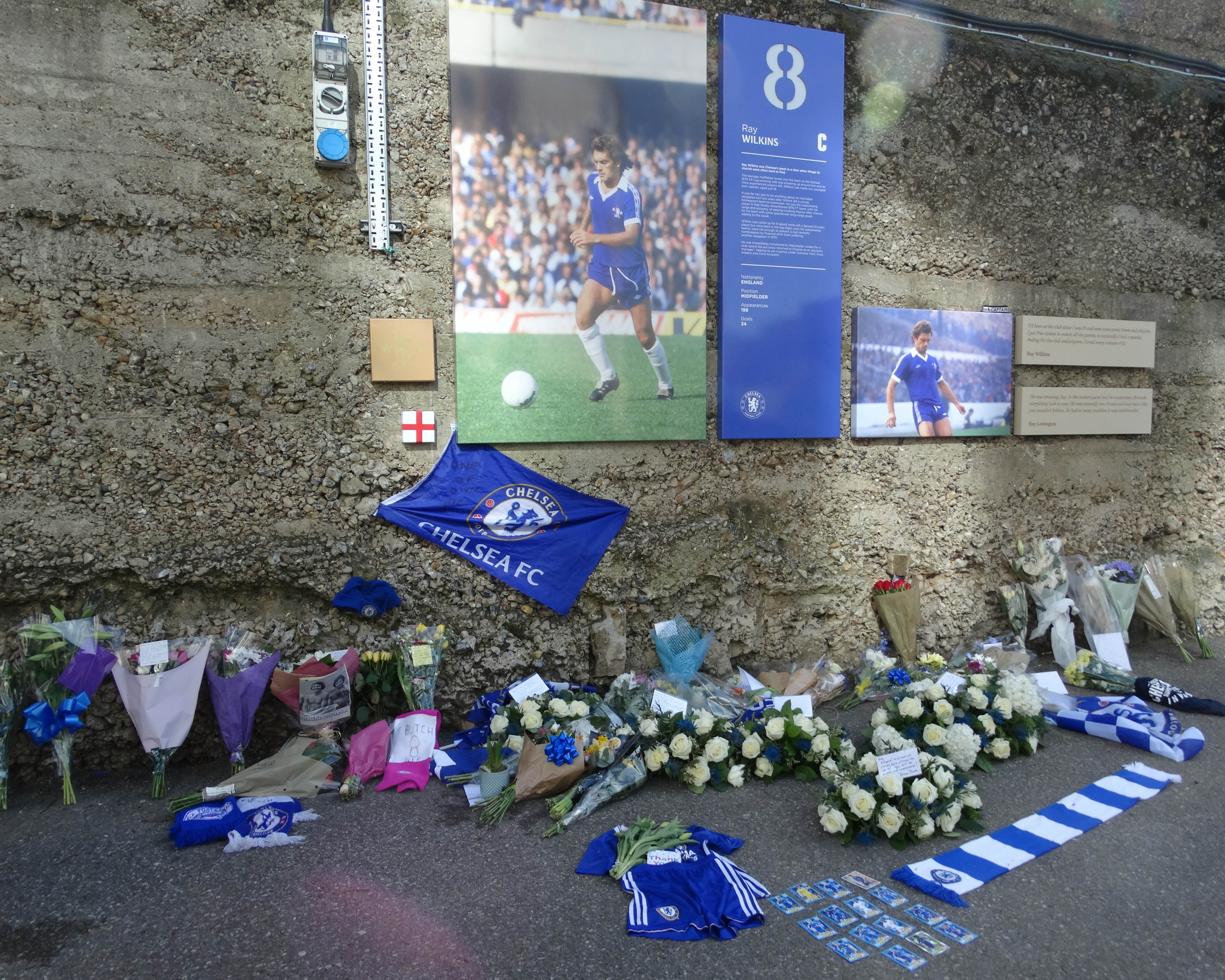
Memorial wall outside Stamford Bridge

The son of professional footballer George Wilkins, he had two sisters and three footballer brothers: Graham Wilkins (born 28 June 1955 in Hillingdon), a former professional, who played in the Football League as a full-back for Chelsea, Brentford, and Southend United; former Brighton & Hove Albion manager and player Dean Wilkins; and Stephen Wilkins, who was signed by Chelsea and later made one appearance for Brentford, before playing for a number of non-League teams, including Dagenham and Hayes. Throughout his life, Wilkins was known by his childhood nickname of "Butch".

Wilkins married Jackie (née Bygraves) in 1978. The couple had a son and a daughter.

He was a patron for the charity Cardiac Risk in the Young. In 1993, he was made an MBE.

In March 2013, he was stopped while driving and found to be "nearly four times" over the legal alcohol limit. In February 2014, he said that he had ulcerative colitis. In July 2016, Wilkins was given a four-year ban for drunk driving. In August 2016, he admitted he was an alcoholic.

== Death ==
On 28 March 2018, Wilkins had a cardiac arrest, resulting in a fall, and was placed into an induced coma at St George's Hospital in Tooting. He died at the age of 61 on 4 April 2018.

Hours after his death, Milan played rivals Inter Milan in the Derby della Madonnina at the San Siro. His former captain Franco Baresi laid a bouquet of flowers next to Wilkins' shirt by the side of the pitch. A section of Milan fans held aloft a banner which read "Ciao Ray: Leggenda Rossonera" (English: "Goodbye Ray: Legend of the Red and Blacks"). During Chelsea's home game against West Ham United on 8 April, fans at Stamford Bridge gave a minute's applause in the eighth minute to pay tribute to Wilkins. They also held a banner which read "Ray was one those select few, he knew what it meant to be one of us a real blue blood. Chelsea flowed through his veins, may you rest in peace Ray."

A memorial service was held for Wilkins on 1 May at St Luke's Church, Chelsea, attended by many figures from the world of football. His son made a speech about Wilkins' struggles with depression and alcoholism. On 19 May, his widow Jackie was the guest of honour at the FA Cup final between two of Wilkins' former clubs, Chelsea and Manchester United. Chelsea won the match 1–0 and she presented the trophy to Gary Cahill, the winning captain.

== Career statistics ==
=== Club ===
Appearances and goals by club, season and competition
| Club | Season | League | | | National cup (Note: Includes FA Cup, Coppa Italia, Coupe de France, Scottish Cup) | | Other | | Total | |
| Club | Season | Division | Apps | Goals | Apps | Goals | Apps | Goals | Apps | Goals |
|---|---|---|---|---|---|---|---|---|---|---|
| Chelsea | 1973–74 | First Division | 6 | 0 | 1 | 0 | 0 | 0 | 7 | 0 |
| Chelsea | 1974–75 | First Division | 21 | 2 | 2 | 0 | 1 | 0 | 24 | 2 |
| Chelsea | 1975–76 | Second Division | 42 | 11 | 4 | 1 | 4 | 0 | 50 | 12 |
| Chelsea | 1976–77 | Second Division | 42 | 7 | 2 | 0 | 6 | 2 | 50 | 9 |
| Chelsea | 1977–78 | First Division | 33 | 7 | 3 | 1 | 4 | 1 | 40 | 9 |
| Chelsea | 1978–79 | First Division | 35 | 3 | 0 | 0 | 1 | 0 | 36 | 3 |
| Chelsea | Total | | 179 | 30 | 12 | 2 | 16 | 3 | 207 | 35 |
| Manchester United | 1979–80 | First Division | 37 | 2 | 2 | 0 | 3 | 0 | 42 | 2 |
| Manchester United | 1980–81 | First Division | 13 | 0 | 2 | 0 | 0 | 0 | 15 | 0 |
| Manchester United | 1981–82 | First Division | 42 | 1 | 1 | 0 | 2 | 0 | 45 | 1 |
| Manchester United | 1982–83 | First Division | 26 | 1 | 4 | 1 | 6 | 0 | 36 | 2 |
| Manchester United | 1983–84 | First Division | 42 | 3 | 1 | 0 | 13 | 2 | 56 | 5 |
| Manchester United | Total | | 160 | 7 | 10 | 1 | 24 | 2 | 194 | 10 |
| Milan | 1984–85 | Serie A | 28 | 0 | 12 | 0 | 0 | 0 | 40 | 0 |
| Milan | 1985–86 | Serie A | 29 | 2 | 6 | 1 | 6 | 0 | 41 | 3 |
| Milan | 1986–87 | Serie A | 16 | 0 | 7 | 0 | 1 | 0 | 24 | 0 |
| Milan | Total | | 73 | 2 | 25 | 1 | 7 | 0 | 105 | 3 |
| Paris Saint-Germain | 1987–88 | French Division 1 | 13 | 0 | 0 | 0 | 0 | 0 | 13 | 0 |
| Rangers | 1987–88 | Scottish Premier Division | 24 | 1 | 3 | 0 | 2 | 0 | 29 | 1 |
| Rangers | 1988–89 | Scottish Premier Division | 31 | 1 | 6 | 0 | 8 | 2 | 45 | 3 |
| Rangers | 1989–90 | Scottish Premier Division | 15 | 0 | 0 | 0 | 7 | 0 | 22 | 0 |
| Rangers | Total | | 70 | 2 | 9 | 0 | 17 | 2 | 96 | 4 |
| Queens Park Rangers | 1989–90 | First Division | 23 | 1 | 9 | 2 | 0 | 0 | 32 | 3 |
| Queens Park Rangers | 1990–91 | First Division | 38 | 2 | 1 | 0 | 5 | 0 | 44 | 2 |
| Queens Park Rangers | 1991–92 | First Division | 27 | 1 | 1 | 0 | 2 | 1 | 30 | 2 |
| Queens Park Rangers | 1992–93 | Premier League | 27 | 2 | 1 | 0 | 4 | 0 | 32 | 2 |
| Queens Park Rangers | 1993–94 | Premier League | 39 | 1 | 1 | 0 | 4 | 0 | 44 | 1 |
| Queens Park Rangers | Total | | 154 | 7 | 13 | 2 | 15 | 1 | 182 | 10 |
| Crystal Palace | 1994–95 | Premier League | 1 | 0 | 0 | 0 | 0 | 0 | 1 | 0 |
| Queens Park Rangers | 1994–95 | Premier League | 2 | 0 | 0 | 0 | 0 | 0 | 2 | 0 |
| Queens Park Rangers | 1995–96 | Premier League | 15 | 0 | 1 | 0 | 3 | 0 | 19 | 0 |
| Queens Park Rangers | 1996–97 | First Division | 4 | 0 | 0 | 0 | 0 | 0 | 4 | 0 |
| Queens Park Rangers | Total | | 21 | 0 | 1 | 0 | 3 | 0 | 25 | 0 |
| Wycombe Wanderers | 1996–97 | Second Division | 1 | 0 | 0 | 0 | 0 | 0 | 1 | 0 |
| Hibernian | 1996–97 | Scottish Premier Division | 16 | 0 | 0 | 0 | 1 | 0 | 17 | 0 |
| Millwall | 1996–97 | Second Division | 3 | 0 | 0 | 0 | 1 | 0 | 4 | 0 |
| Leyton Orient | 1996–97 | Third Division | 3 | 0 | 0 | 0 | 0 | 0 | 3 | 0 |
| Career total | | | 694 | 48 | 70 | 6 | 84 | 8 | 848 | 62 |

=== International ===
Appearances and goals by national team and year
| National team | Year | Apps | Goals |
|---|---|---|---|
| England | 1976 | 3 | 0 |
| England | 1977 | 7 | 0 |
| England | 1978 | 8 | 0 |
| England | 1979 | 9 | 1 |
| England | 1980 | 8 | 1 |
| England | 1981 | 7 | 0 |
| England | 1982 | 12 | 1 |
| England | 1983 | 1 | 0 |
| England | 1984 | 10 | 0 |
| England | 1985 | 9 | 0 |
| England | 1986 | 10 | 0 |
| Total | | 84 | 3 |

Scores and results list England's goal tally first, score column indicates score after each Wilkins goal.

List of international goals scored by Ray Wilkins
| No. | Date | Venue | Cap | Opponent | Score | Result | Competition | Ref. |
|---|---|---|---|---|---|---|---|---|
| 1 | 13 June 1979 | Praterstadion, Vienna, Austria | 24 | Austria | 3–3 | 3–4 | Friendly | |
| 2 | 12 June 1980 | Stadio Comunale, Turin, Italy | 33 | Belgium | 1–0 | 1–1 | UEFA Euro 1980 | |
| 3 | 23 February 1982 | Wembley Stadium, London, England | 43 | Northern Ireland | 3–0 | 4–0 | Home Championship | |

=== Managerial statistics ===
Managerial record by team and tenure
| Team | From | To | Record | | | | | Ref |
| Team | From | To | P | W | D | L | Win % | Ref |
|---|---|---|---|---|---|---|---|---|
| Queens Park Rangers | 15 November 1994 | 4 September 1996 | 80 | 31 | 13 | 36 | 38.75 | |
| Fulham | 25 September 1997 | 7 May 1998 | 43 | 20 | 8 | 15 | 46.51 | |
| Chelsea (caretaker) | 13 September 2000 | 17 September 2000 | 2 | 1 | 0 | 1 | 50.00 | |
| Chelsea (caretaker) | 9 February 2009 | 14 February 2009 | 1 | 1 | 0 | 0 | 100.00 | |
| Jordan | 3 September 2014 | 1 July 2015 | 15 | 2 | 2 | 11 | 13.33 | |
| Total | | | 142 | 56 | 23 | 63 | 39.44 | |

== Honours ==
=== Player ===
Manchester United

- FA Cup: 1982–83
- FA Charity Shield: 1983
- Football League Cup runner-up: 1982–83

Rangers

- Scottish Premier Division: 1988–89, 1989–90
- Scottish League Cup: 1988–89

England

- Rous Cup: 1986
- British Home Championship: 1977–78, 1981–82, 1982–83

Individual

- Chelsea Player of the Year: 1975–76, 1976–77
- World Soccer World XI: 1985
- English Football Hall of Fame: 2013
