= Terry Butcher =

English footballer & manager (born 1958)

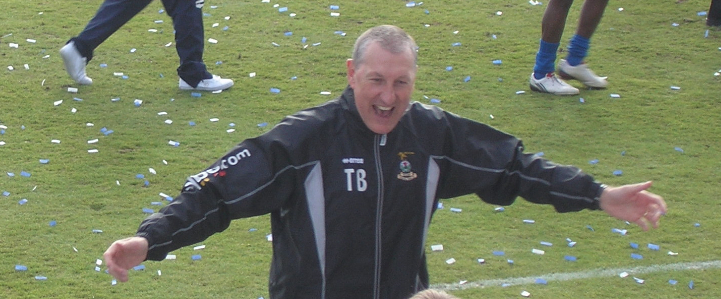
- Butcher as Inverness Caledonian Thistle manager in 2010

Personal information
- Full name: Terry Ian Butcher
- Date of birth: 28 December 1958 (age 67)
- Place of birth: Singapore
- Height: 1.93 m (6 ft 4 in)
- Positions: Centre back; sweeper

Senior career*
Years	Team	Apps	(Gls)
1976–1986	Ipswich Town	271	(16)
1986–1990	Rangers	127	(8)
1990–1992	Coventry City	6	(0)
1992–1993	Sunderland	38	(0)
1994	Clydebank	3	(0)
Total		445	(24)

International career
1979–1980	England U21	7	(0)
1979	England B	1	(0)
1980–1990	England	77	(3)

Managerial career
- 1990–1992: Coventry City
- 1993: Sunderland
- 2002–2006: Motherwell
- 2006–2007: Sydney FC
- 2007: Partick Thistle (caretaker)
- 2007: Brentford
- 2009–2013: Inverness Caledonian Thistle
- 2013–2014: Hibernian
- 2015: Newport County
- 2018: Philippines
- * Club domestic league appearances and goals

Terry Ian Butcher (born 28 December 1958) is an English football manager and former player.

During his playing career as a defender, Butcher captained the England national team, winning 77 caps in a ten-year international career that featured three FIFA World Cups. He is acknowledged as one of the players Diego Maradona dribbled in the Goal of the Century. Butcher also enjoyed success in his club career, particularly with Ipswich Town and Rangers. He has subsequently managed clubs in England, Scotland, Australia and Wales and also had a brief spell in charge of the Philippines national team.

== Early life ==
Born in Singapore, where his father was commissioned with the Royal Navy, Butcher spent most of his childhood in Lowestoft, Suffolk, where he attended Lowestoft Grammar School. He turned down the chance to join the Norwich City youth team, as he was a fan of East Anglian rivals Ipswich Town. He joined the Portman Road club in August 1976 after a three-week trial.

== Club career ==
=== Ipswich Town ===
Butcher made his debut for Ipswich Town against Everton in the First Division on 15 April 1978 and over the next eight seasons would establish himself as the club's top central defender, combining leadership with great aerial ability and courage. This was soon noticed by England manager Ron Greenwood who gave him his debut in a friendly against Australia in 1980.

In 1981, Butcher was part of the Ipswich side that won the UEFA Cup under Bobby Robson and came close to their first League title since 1962, though they were pipped at the post by Aston Villa.

Butcher was named Player of the Year in 1985 and 1986, the latter season seeing Ipswich relegated to the Second Division.

=== Rangers ===
In 1986, Butcher left Ipswich when they were relegated, and became one of the first 'English invasion' players to join Scottish club Rangers following the appointment of Graeme Souness as manager. Souness, the former Liverpool player, paid Ipswich £725,000 for him in July 1986. As captain, he led them to three League titles in four seasons, plus two Scottish League Cups.

In November 1987 he broke his leg during a Scottish Premier Division fixture against Aberdeen, which ruled him out for the rest of the season. In April 1988 Butcher was convicted of disorderly conduct and breach of the peace due to his behaviour in an Old Firm match in October 1987. He was fined £250. In October 1988 Butcher was the subject of a police investigation when he kicked the referee's room door off its hinges after a match at Pittodrie. No criminal charges were brought, but the SFA fined Butcher £1500. Butcher was the subject of a £1million bid from Manchester United in July 1988, but this was rejected by Rangers.

Butcher's final game for Rangers came in September 1990, in a 2–1 league defeat against Dundee United. He was partly responsible for both of the opposition's goals, leading to him being dropped from the side. In November 1990, he was approached by Leeds United, and came close to signing for the Elland Road club, but was then offered job as player-manager of Coventry City.

=== Coventry City ===
Leeds United manager Howard Wilkinson was soon in talks with Graeme Souness about bringing Butcher back south of the border, but when Butcher did depart from Ibrox it was in a £400,000 deal to become player-manager of Coventry City on 15 November 1990. One of his first games as Coventry manager was against the Leeds side he had come close to signing for, holding them to a 1–1 league draw at Highfield Road on 24 November. Other promising early results included a thrilling 5–4 home win over cup holders Nottingham Forest in the Football League Cup fourth round on 28 November. However, their quest for the League Cup ended in the quarter-finals on 23 January 1991 when they were beaten 1–0 at home by eventual winners Sheffield Wednesday. Six days later their FA Cup was ended in a fourth round replay defeat by Southampton

Butcher made six league appearances for the Sky Blues as they finished 16th in the 1990–91 First Division and then retired as a player. In the 1991–92 season, Coventry defeated Luton Town 5–0 in their second league game and achieved a surprise 2–1 away win over defending league champions Arsenal, as well as a 1–0 home win over local rivals Aston Villa- to occupy sixth place in the league by the end of September, putting them ahead of more fancied teams including Liverpool and Everton. However, their form dropped over the next two months, and by the end of November they had fallen to 13th place. A 2–1 home defeat by Tottenham Hotspur on New Year's Day 1992 saw them enter the new year in 15th place, six points clear of the relegation zone.

Butcher was dismissed on 6 January 1992 after just over a year as Coventry City manager, being replaced by his recently appointed assistant Don Howe.

=== Later career ===
Butcher re-registered himself as a player in August 1992, when he signed for Sunderland – founder members of the new Division One, which was the second tier of English football following the creation of the new FA Premier League. He played 38 times for the Wearside club in 1992–93, becoming player-manager following the dismissal of manager Malcolm Crosby in January 1993 and securing their Division One survival by a single place. He never played again for the club and was sacked on 26 November 1993 after a disappointing start to the 1993–94 season saw them battling relegation once again – with the battle being won under Butcher's successor Mick Buxton.

Butcher then played three games for Clydebank before retiring as a player.

== International career ==
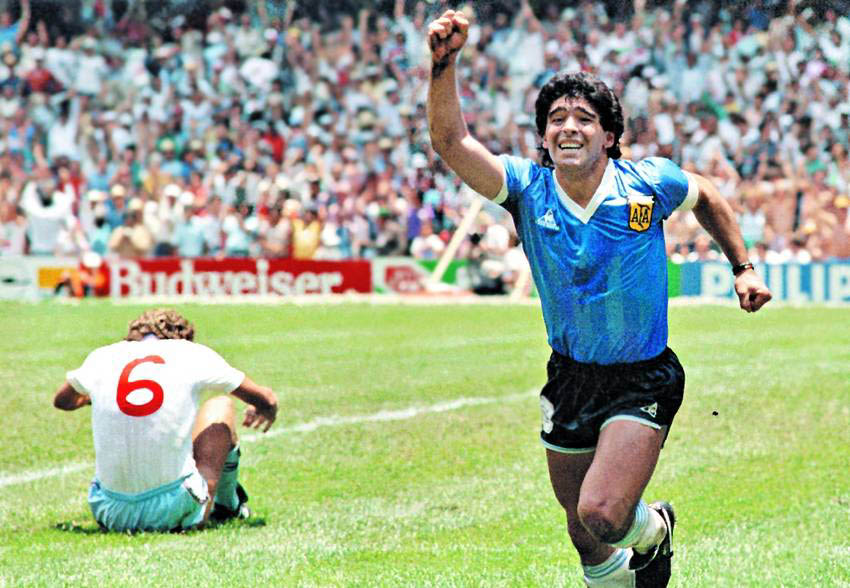
Butcher (No. 6) is dejected as Diego Maradona celebrates his second goal (considered one of the best goals in World Cup history) during the 1986 World Cup

Butcher's performances for Ipswich were noticed by England manager Ron Greenwood, who gave him his debut in a friendly against Australia on 31 May 1980, when he was 21 years old. He won his second cap 10 months later in a 2–1 defeat against Spain (also a friendly).

Butcher was the youngest member of the back four that featured at the 1982 World Cup in Spain. He became a regular member of the national side at this stage and remained England's first choice centre-back for the rest of the decade, playing in the 1986 World Cup. In that tournament he played in the quarter final against Argentina in which Diego Maradona passed five English players before scoring, a goal sometimes described as the 'goal of the century'.

A broken leg meant that Butcher was not in the England side that exited at the group stage of the 1988 European Championship while manager Robson was forced to rely on an inexperienced defensive partnership of Tony Adams and Mark Wright.

While playing for England in a vital World Cup qualifier against Sweden in Stockholm on 6 September 1989, Butcher suffered a deep cut to his forehead early in the game. Butcher had some impromptu stitches inserted by the physiotherapist and, swathed in bandages, continued playing. His constant heading of the ball – unavoidable when playing in the centre of defence – disintegrated the bandages and reopened the cut to the extent that his white England shirt was red with blood by the end of the game. The image is regarded as iconic.

England made the semi-finals of the 1990 World Cup with Butcher at the helm of a more-cautious back five (Butcher with Wright and Des Walker in the centre, plus full-backs Stuart Pearce and – initially – Gary Stevens, later Paul Parker); he also took over the captaincy after an injury ended Bryan Robson's tournament prematurely. After the World Cup, Butcher retired from international football with 77 caps and three goals to his name over a period of 10 years.

== Managerial career ==
=== Coventry City ===
Butcher left Rangers on 15 November 1990 to become player-manager of Coventry City (as successor to John Sillett). At one month short of 32 he was the youngest manager in the Football League on his appointment.

Under Sillett, Coventry had won the FA Cup in 1987 and finished as high as seventh in the First Division in 1989, but a dismal start to the 1990–91 season had seen Coventry fall back into the relegation battle that had been all too familiar occurrence at Highfield Road since Coventry first reached the top flight in 1967. With Butcher's appointment as manager, Coventry were intent on returning to their winning ways. Butcher steered Coventry to 16th place and safety in 1990–91, and they entered 1992 in 13th place, but he was sacked as manager on 6 January 1992.

Butcher had played six league games for Coventry in the 1990–91 season before announcing his retirement as a player.

=== Sunderland ===
In February 1993, Butcher was named manager of Sunderland, re-registering himself as a player two years after his last game. He achieved survival at the end of the 1992–93 season, but was sacked the following December.

=== Motherwell ===
In October 2001, Butcher became assistant to Eric Black at Motherwell in the Scottish Premier League, taking over from Black a year later as the club was forced to deal with severe financial difficulties. Motherwell reached the 2005 Scottish League Cup Final, where his old team Rangers defeated them 5–1.

=== Sydney ===
After being linked for several weeks with a possible move to Sydney FC, Butcher was announced as their new head coach on 17 May 2006, signing a two-year contract. On 7 February 2007, he was sacked after the club were knocked out of the finals series with a 3–2 aggregate loss to the Newcastle Jets.

=== Brentford ===
On 30 March 2007, Butcher was appointed as assistant coach at Partick Thistle. However, this was a short lived appointment as he became the manager of Brentford on 24 April 2007 (he officially took up the role on 7 May 2007).

After a poor run of results, including only 5 wins in 23 matches, and under increasing pressure from the fans who had been chanting the name of former boss Martin Allen, he left Brentford on 11 December 2007.

=== Scotland national team ===
Butcher was named as George Burley's assistant in 2008 during Scotland's World Cup 2010 qualifying campaign. Butcher still harboured resentment for Maradona's Hand of God goal against England 22 years earlier. So in the days leading up to a friendly against Argentina, managed by Diego Maradona, Butcher's views on Maradona were a talking point in the media. Butcher said in interviews that Maradona was a cheat and a liar, and he would be happy to see him lose. Scotland lost the game 1–0. When Maradona was asked about what Butcher had said about him, he replied "Who is Butcher?"

In November 2009 George Burley was sacked as Scotland manager and at the same time Butcher left by mutual consent.

=== Inverness Caledonian Thistle ===
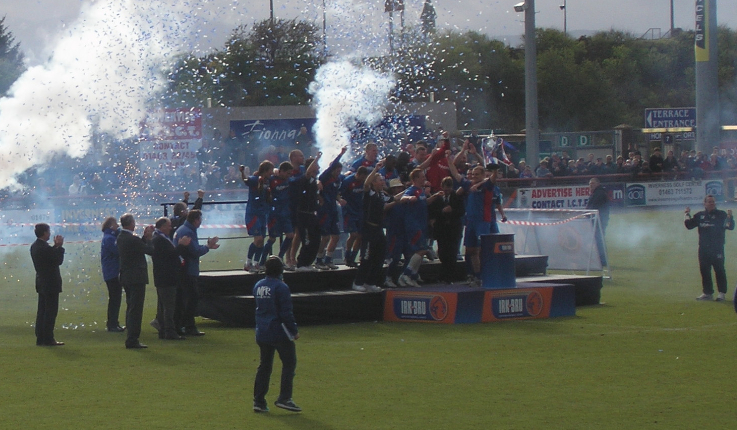
The Inverness team celebrate winning the First Division title in May 2010 at the Caledonian Stadium (Butcher is to the left of the stage)

On 27 January 2009, Butcher was appointed manager of Inverness Caledonian Thistle, signing an 18-month contract while also continuing his role as assistant manager to George Burley for the Scotland national team. Butcher was joined in Inverness by Maurice Malpas as his assistant manager. In May 2009, Inverness were relegated from the Scottish Premier League. After a bad start to the 2009–10 First Division league campaign, Butcher managed to turn things around for Inverness. By the end of March, Butcher had guided his club from 16 points behind league leaders Dundee, to four points ahead and top of the Scottish First Division. He was awarded the "Irn Bru Phenomenal" manager of the month award for March. Inverness won the Irn Bru First Division on 21 April 2020, after Dundee were beaten 1–0 by Raith Rovers clinching Inverness's return to the Scottish Premier League. He was the last manager to be promoted with Inverness until 2026 where Scott Kellacher helped his club to promotion from Scottish League One to the Scottish Championship.

As part of the push for promotion in 2009–10, ICT went on an unbeaten away run in the league that continued through the entire 2010 calendar year, culminating in a 1–1 draw against Hearts at Tynecastle on 18 December. In April 2010 his contract was extended to the end of the 2011–12 season. In the SPL 2010–11 season, the club finished seventh, only narrowly missing out on a top six finish. Butcher was inducted to the Scottish Football Hall of Fame in November 2011.

In the 2012–13 season Butcher received a manager of the month award for a second time in November, along with two Inverness players Aaron Doran and Billy McKay, having receiving it for October in the 2010–11 season. This was explained due to winning three matches (including away to Celtic) and drawing another, despite the other fixture in the month being a 5–1 defeat to Motherwell and he led the club into second place by the end of 2012. Butcher expressed his delight with the club staying in second place and also his pleasure with the defenders, who were becoming more prominent than his free-scoring forward line.

In January 2013, Butcher rejected an offer to manage Barnsley, having been linked to succeed Keith Hill. After rejecting Barnsley, Butcher explained that one of his reasons for staying was his belief that the club could make history and that he was happy to continue his stay in Scotland. His decision to stay was greeted with relief by defender Daniel Devine, who had signed for the club earlier that month.

Butcher's efforts in guiding Inverness to their top six finish were recognised when he was nominated in the four-man shortlist for PFA Scotland Manager of the Year.

=== Hibernian ===
On 5 November 2013, Inverness confirmed that they had received an official approach from fellow Premiership side Hibernian to replace former manager Pat Fenlon with Butcher. On 11 November, Hibernian reached a compensation deal with Inverness for Terry Butcher to move to the club, alongside assistant manager Maurice Malpas. Butcher agreed to a three-year contract, and his appointment was confirmed by the club on 12 November.

A week after Butcher's departure, Inverness supporters responded to his departure with "Terry who?" in the match against St Johnstone. On 2 January 2014, Butcher won the first Edinburgh derby of his managerial career, as they won 2–1. Butcher failed to sign any players in mid-January until signing Daniel Boateng, Danny Haynes and Duncan Watmore on the last day of the transfer window.

As the months progressed, Hibernian's results went badly. His predecessor, Pat Fenlon, had left the team in a mid-table position, but a series of bad performances led to Butcher apologising and supporters describing his tactics as "gutless", "passionless" and "clueless". Hibernian dropped to the bottom half in the league, putting them at risk of relegation. Defeats in the bottom half for Hibernian led Butcher to cancel players' day-off. Further defeats to Ross County and Kilmarnock placed Hibernian eleventh place and facing the play-offs to keep their Premiership place.

On 25 May 2014 Hibernian were relegated to the Scottish Championship, losing a two-leg playoff against Hamilton Academical. After the match, Butcher described Hibernian relegation as his "darkest day in football". Butcher was criticised by James McPake, who Butcher replaced as captain with Liam Craig, for not selecting him to play despite being fit. After a meeting with new chief executive Leeann Dempster to discuss Hibs' future plans, Butcher was sacked by the club on 10 June 2014. There were also rumours of Butcher losing the dressing room and then asking players to leave the club in the January transfer window, only to use them to help the club survive relegation.

Butcher interviewed for the vacant managerial position at Motherwell in December 2014, but then asked not to be considered for the position.

=== Newport County ===
On 30 April 2015 Butcher was appointed manager of Welsh club Newport County in League Two on a two-year contract. He took up the role at the end of the 2014–15 season in preparation for the following season, but was sacked on 1 October 2015 with Newport bottom of League Two after gaining just five points from the first ten matches of the season.

=== Philippines ===
On 14 June 2018, Butcher was announced as the new head coach of the Philippines. In 2016, he almost got appointed as head coach of Global Cebu which was set to play in the inaugural edition of the Philippines Football League, but the club favoured Japanese coach Toshiaki Imai instead. He was due to lead the Philippines national team in the 2019 AFC Asian Cup, but on 2 August 2018, he announced that he will not take the role as head coach of the national team because he did not believe the system is in place for his time in charge of the Philippines to be successful. His assistant coach, Scott Cooper took over his post and take charge of the team's 2019 Asian Cup preparations.

=== Guangzhou R&F ===
On 26 July 2019 it was confirmed that Butcher had joined the coaching staff of Chinese club Guangzhou R&F to help fix the team's leaky defence. He was hired as a defensive coach.

=== Return to Ipswich Town ===
In February 2020 it was announced that Butcher would be taking up a new role with Ipswich Town, primarily working with the club's academy whilst also having some involvement with the first-team, but he left the club again in July 2021.

== Media career ==
While living in Suffolk Butcher had a chain of insurance brokers which were later acquired by the Norwich and Peterborough Building Society. Butcher has appeared as a pundit for England matches on BBC Radio 5 Live, Europa League matches on Five and on Setanta Sports' SPL coverage. Butcher also worked for BBC Sport during the 2006 World Cup.

Butcher consistently raised concerns over the sum impact of David Beckham's performances for and involvement with the England national football team, most notably during discussions concerning team and squad selection questions for the 2006 World Cup and Euro 2008 qualification campaign.

Butcher has worked as an English co-commentator for Pro Evolution Soccer and ISS Pro Evolution video games, alongside British voice actor Christopher Kent under the pseudonym "Chris James".

== Personal life ==
Butcher was married in 1980 and has a house in Bawdsey. His parents, as well as wife Rita's, still live in Suffolk. Of his three sons, Christopher who achieved the rank of Captain in the Royal Artillery served in both Iraq and in Afghanistan. Christopher died in October 2017, aged 35, while suffering from PTSD. Butcher is the Patron of Combat2Coffee (appointed in June 2024) a not for profit company, that supports veterans and their families. Butcher is a cousin of the Scottish retired footballer Pat Nevin.

Butcher is a fan of the heavy metal band Iron Maiden and is a friend of bassist and founding member Steve Harris. Butcher is a supporter of the Conservative Party.

== Career statistics ==
=== Club ===
Appearances and goals by club, season and competition
Club	Season	League			National Cup		League Cup		Continental		Total	
Club	Season	Division	Apps	Goals	Apps	Goals	Apps	Goals	Apps	Goals	Apps	Goals
Ipswich Town	1977–78	First Division	3	0							3	0
Ipswich Town	1978–79	First Division	21	2	1	0	2	0			24	2
Ipswich Town	1979–80	First Division	36	2	4	0	2	0	4	0	46	2
Ipswich Town	1980–81	First Division	40	4	7	0	5	0	12	2	64	6
Ipswich Town	1981–82	First Division	27	1	1	0	6	0	2	0	36	1
Ipswich Town	1982–83	First Division	42	0	3	0	2	0	2	1	49	1
Ipswich Town	1983–84	First Division	34	1	2	0	4	0			40	1
Ipswich Town	1984–85	First Division	42	2	5	0	9	0			56	2
Ipswich Town	1985–86	First Division	27	4	5	0	2	2			34	6
Ipswich Town	Total		272	16	28	0	32	2	20	3	352	21
Rangers	1986–87	Scottish Premier Division	43	2	1	0	5	0	6	0	55	2
Rangers	1987–88	Scottish Premier Division	11	1	0	0	3	0	4	0	18	1
Rangers	1988–89	Scottish Premier Division	34	2	8	0	5	0	4	1	51	3
Rangers	1989–90	Scottish Premier Division	34	3	2	0	5	0	2	0	43	3
Rangers	1990–91	Scottish Premier Division	5	0	0	0	3	1	1	0	9	1
Rangers	Total		127	8	11	0	21	1	17	1	176	10
Coventry City	1990–91	First Division	6	0								
Coventry City	1991–92	First Division	0	0								
Coventry City	Total		6	0								
Sunderland	1992–93	First Division	38	0								
Clydebank	1994-95	Scottish First Division	3	0								
Career total			446	24								

=== Managerial ===
As of 21 April 2023

Team	League (s)	From	To	Record				
Team	League (s)	From	To	G	W	D	L	Win %
Coventry City	English Division One	14 November 1990	6 January 1992	60	20	14	26	33.33
Sunderland	Championship	5 February 1993	26 November 1993	43	13	8	22	30.23
Motherwell	Scottish Premier League	24 April 2002	17 May 2006	175	60	37	78	34.29
Sydney	Australian A-League	17 May 2006	8 February 2007	23	9	8	6	39.13
Brentford	English League Two	7 May 2007	11 December 2007	23	5	5	13	21.74
Inverness CT	Scottish First Division; Scottish Premiership	27 January 2009	11 November 2013	208	86	57	65	41.35
Hibernian	Scottish Premiership	12 November 2013	10 June 2014	29	6	8	15	20.69
Newport County	English League Two	2 May 2015	1 October 2015	12	1	3	8	8.33
Total				571	200	140	231	35.03

== Honours ==
=== Player ===
Ipswich Town

- UEFA Cup: 1980–81

Rangers

- Scottish Football League Premier Division: 1986–87, 1988–89, 1989–90
- Scottish League Cup: 1986–87, 1988–89

Individual

- Ipswich Town Player of the Year: 1984–85, 1985–86
- Rangers Hall of Fame: inducted 2000
- Ipswich Town Hall of Fame: Inducted 2010
- Scottish Football Hall of Fame: inducted 2011
- English Football Hall of Fame: Inducted 2021

=== Manager ===
Inverness Caledonian Thistle

- Scottish First Division (second tier): 2009–10

Individual

- Scottish Premiership Manager of the Month: February 2004, September 2004, March 2006, October 2010, November 2012, August 2013

== See also ==
- List of England international footballers born outside England
