= 1986 Scottish League Cup final =

- Event: 1986–87 Scottish League Cup
| Rangers | Celtic |
| 2 | 1 |
- Date: 26 October 1986
- Venue: Hampden Park, Glasgow
- Referee: David Syme
- Attendance: 74,219

The 1986 Scottish League Cup final was played on 26 October 1986, at Hampden Park in Glasgow and was the final of the 41st Scottish League Cup competition. The final was contested by Rangers and Celtic in an Old Firm derby.

Rangers won the match 2–1, thanks to goals from Davie Cooper and Ian Durrant. In the aftermath of Mo Johnston's dismissal, Tony Shepherd was shown a red card by referee David Syme, who thought he had been struck by Shepherd. The linesman on the bench side confirmed that in fact it was a coin thrown from the crowd that had hit him, and Shepherd's red card was immediately retracted, although the chaotic nature of the incident led to confused accounts in contemporary reports.

== Match details ==
26 October 1986

| Rangers | 2–1 | Celtic |
|---|---|---|
| Durrant 62'; Cooper 84' (pen.) | Report | McClair 70' |

Hampden Park, Glasgow
Attendance: 74,219
Referee: David Syme

RANGERS :
| GK | Chris Woods |
| RB | Jimmy Nicholl |
| CB | Ally Dawson |
| CB | Terry Butcher (c) |
| LB | Stuart Munro |
| RM | Cammy Fraser |
| CM | Ian Durrant | (substituted off) 2' |
| CM | Derek Ferguson |
| LM | Ted McMinn |
| CF | Davie Cooper |
| CF | Ally McCoist | (substituted off) 1' |
Substitutes:
| MF | Dave MacFarlane | (substituted on) 2' |
| FW | Robert Fleck | (substituted on) 1' |
Manager:
Graeme Souness

CELTIC :
GK | Packie Bonner
RB | Peter Grant
LB | Murdo MacLeod
CB | Roy Aitken (c)
CB | Derek Whyte
CF | Mark McGhee | (substituted off) 1'
CM | Brian McClair
CM | Paul McStay
CF | Mo Johnston | (red card) 87'
CM | Tony Shepherd
CF | Alan McInally
Substitutes:
LW | Owen Archdeacon | (substituted on) 1'
Manager:
David Hay
