= 1985–86 Watford F.C. season =

English football team season

Watford
1985–86 season
- Chairman: Elton John
- Manager: Graham Taylor
- Stadium: Vicarage Road
- First Division: 12th
- FA Cup: Sixth round (eliminated by Liverpool)
- League Cup: Third round (eliminated by Queens Park Rangers)

The 1985–86 season was Watford's 105th season in existence, and their fourth season in the First Division, following promotion in the 1981–82 season, in which they finished 12th. Along with the First Division, they competed in the FA Cup and Football League Cup, being eliminated in the sixth and third rounds respectively.

== Competitions ==
=== First Division ===
==== League table ====
Pos	Team	Pld	W	D	L	GF	GA	GD	Pts
10	Tottenham Hotspur	42	19	8	15	74	52	+22	65
11	Newcastle United	42	17	12	13	67	72	−5	63
12	Watford	42	16	11	15	69	62	+7	59
13	Queens Park Rangers	42	15	7	20	53	64	−11	52
14	Southampton	42	12	10	20	51	62	−11	46

Source: World Football
Rules for classification: 1) Points; 2) Goal difference; 3) Goals scored

==== Matches ====
First Division match results
Date	Opponent	Venue	Result F–A	Scorers	Attendance
17 August 1985	Tottenham Hotspur	A	0–4		29,884
20 August 1985	Birmingham City	H	3–0	West, Bames (2)	14,278
24 August 1985	West Bromwich Albion	H	5–1	West (3), Terry, Talbot	14,541
26 August 1985	Sheffield Wednesday	A	1–2	Blissett	21,962
31 August 1985	Coventry City	H	3–0	Rostron, West, Smillie	13,835
4 September 1985	Leicester City	A	2–2	Rostron (2)	9,672
7 September 1985	Liverpool	A	1–3	West	31,395
14 September 1985	Queens Park Rangers	H	2–0	Blissett, Callaghan	15,771
21 September 1985	Nottingham Forest	A	2–3	Callaghan, Rostron	12,921
28 September 1985	Chelsea	H	3–1	Barnes, Blissett, Terry	16,035
5 October 1985	Southampton	A	1–3	Talbot	14,172
12 October 1985	Manchester City	H	3–2	Blissett, Callaghan, Barnes	15,418
19 October 1985	Everton	A	1–4	Jackett (pen.)	26,425
26 October 1985	Oxford United	H	2–2	Rostron, Callaghan	16,126
2 November 1985	Newcastle United	A	1–1	West	20,649
9 November 1985	Aston Villa	H	1–1	Talbot	14,085
16 November 1985	West Ham United	A	1–2	Sterling	21,490
23 November 1985	Luton Town	H	1–2	Talbot	16,107
30 November 1985	Manchester United	A	1–1	West	42,181
7 December 1985	Birmingham City	A	2–1	Blissett, Sterling	7,043
14 December 1985	Tottenham Hotspur	H	1–0	Blissett	16,327
22 December 1985	West Bromwich Albion	A	1–3	Sterling	11,092
28 December 1985	Leicester City	H	2–1	West (2)	14,709
1 January 1986	Ipswich Town	A	0–0		15,922
12 January 1986	Liverpool	H	2–3	Jackett, Lohman	16,697
18 January 1986	Coventry City	A	2–0	Barnes (2)	7,499
1 February 1986	Sheffield Wednesday	H	2–1	West, Bames	13,144
15 March 1986	Manchester City	A	1–0	Terry	18,899
22 March 1986	Queens Park Rangers	A	1–2	Terry	14,069
29 March 1986	Ipswich Town	H	0–0		14,988
31 March 1986	Arsenal	A	2–0	Bames, Allen	19,599
1 April 1986	Arsenal	H	3–0	Smillie, Jackett (pen.), Allen	18,635
5 April 1986	Newcastle United	H	4–1	Talbot, Porter, Gibbs, Smillie	14,706
9 April 1986	Oxford United	A	1–1	McClelland	10,680
12 April 1986	Aston Villa	A	1–4	Sinnott	12,781
15 April 1986	Everton	H	0–2		18,960
19 April 1986	West Ham United	H	0–2		16,651
21 April 1986	Nottingham Forest	H	1–1	Bames	11,510
26 April 1986	Luton Town	A	2–3	Jackett (pen.), Sinnott	11,810
29 April 1986	Southampton	H	1–1	West	11,868
3 May 1986	Manchester United	H	1–1	Blissett	18,414
5 May 1986	Chelsea	A	5–1	Talbot (2), Bardsley (2), West	12,017

=== FA Cup ===
FA Cup match results
Round	Date	Opponent	Venue	Result F–A	Scorers	Attendance
Third round	4 January 1986	Coventry City	A	3–1	West (2), Jackett	10,498
Fourth round	25 January 1986	Manchester City	A	1–1	Jackett	31,632
Fourth round replay	3 February 1986	Manchester City	H	0–0		19,347
Fourth round, second replay	6 February 1986	Manchester City	A	3–1	Smillie, Barnes, Sterling	27,260
Fifth round	5 March 1986	Bury	H	1–1	Barnes	13,316
Fifth round replay	8 March 1986	Bury	A	3–0	Callaghan, West, Sterling	7,501
Sixth round	11 March 1986	Liverpool	A	0–0		36,775
Sixth round replay	17 March 1986	Liverpool	H	1–2	Barnes	28,097

=== League Cup ===
League Cup match results
Round	Date	Opponent	Venue	Result F–A	Scorers	Attendance
Second round, first leg	24 September 1985	Crewe Alexandra	A	3–1	Rostron, Blissett, Jackett	4,265
Second round, second leg	7 October 1985	Crewe Alexandra	H	3–2	Terry, Callaghan, Barnes	11,583
Third round	30 October 1985	Queens Park Rangers	H	0–1		16,826
