= Dave MacFarlane =

Scottish footballer

Personal information
- Full name: David MacFarlane
- Date of birth: 16 January 1967
- Place of birth: Irvine, Scotland
- Date of death: 30 October 2013 (aged 46)
- Place of death: Kilmarnock, Scotland
- Position: Midfielder

Senior career*
Years	Team	Apps	(Gls)
1984–1988	Rangers	7	(0)
1987	→ Kilmarnock (loan)	4	(3)
1988	→ Dundee (loan)	2	(0)
1988–1990	Kilmarnock	30	(4)
1990	Partick Thistle	9	(1)
1990–1991	Sunshine George Cross	2	(0)
- Glenafton Athletic
Total		54	(8)
- * Club domestic league appearances and goals

Dave MacFarlane (16 January 1967 – 30 October 2013) was a Scottish professional football player who is best known for his time with Kilmarnock.

MacFarlane began his career with Ayr United Boys Club before joining Rangers. Whilst at Ibrox he made seven league appearances and picked up a winner's medal in October 1986 when he came on as a second-half substitute in Rangers 2–1 win over Celtic in the Scottish League Cup Final. MacFarlane also had loan spells with Kilmarnock and Dundee, before joining the former on a permanent basis in 1988. He spent nearly two seasons at Rugby Park.

A brief spell with Partick Thistle followed before MacFarlane moved to the junior leagues to Glenafton Athletic, who were managed by Scottish former international goalkeeper Alan Rough. He became a regular pick for the junior side and played in three consecutive Scottish Junior Cup finals, winning the trophy in 1992.
