= Derek Ferguson =

Scottish footballer and manager

Personal information
- Full name: Derek Ferguson
- Date of birth: 31 July 1967 (age 59)
- Place of birth: Calderbank, North Lanarkshire, Scotland
- Position: Midfielder

Youth career
- 1982–1984: Rangers

Senior career*
Years	Team	Apps	(Gls)
1983–1990	Rangers	111	(7)
1990	→ Dundee (loan)	4	(0)
1990–1993	Heart of Midlothian	103	(4)
1993–1995	Sunderland	64	(0)
1995–1998	Falkirk	32	(3)
1998–1999	Dunfermline Athletic	20	(0)
1999	Portadown	6	(1)
1999	Partick Thistle	7	(0)
1999–2000	Adelaide Force	2	(0)
2000	Ross County	10	(0)
2000–2002	Clydebank	55	(1)
2002–2003	Alloa Athletic	27	(0)
2003–2005	Hamilton Academical	25	(0)
2005–2006	Raith Rovers	9	(0)
Total		475	(16)

International career
1986–1989	Scotland U21	5	(0)
1988	Scotland	2	(0)
1990	Scotland B	1	(0)

Managerial career
- 2001–2002: Clydebank
- 2008–2009: Stranraer
- 2009: Glenafton Athletic
- * Club domestic league appearances and goals

Derek Ferguson (born 31 July 1967) is a Scottish former professional footballer and manager. A creative midfield player, Ferguson is best remembered for his time with Rangers and Heart of Midlothian.

He also played for Dundee, Sunderland, Falkirk, Dunfermline Athletic, Portadown, Partick Thistle, Adelaide Force, Ross County, Clydebank, Alloa Athletic, Hamilton Academical, Raith Rovers and made two appearances for Scotland.

== Playing career ==
=== Club ===
Ferguson joined his first senior club, Rangers, from Gartcosh United in 1982. He enjoyed an early experience of first team involvement when picked to play in Tom Forsyth's testimonial match in 1983, aged only 15. He made his competitive debut in the 1983–84 season aged 16 years, 24 days (which remains a club record) and within a year became a first team regular at Ibrox. He showed his early promise to a wide audience with his performances alongside fellow young midfielder Ian Durrant in the Scottish League Cup finals of 1986 (in which he was named man of the match) and 1987.

However, over the next couple of seasons Ferguson gradually fell out of favour at Ibrox, a tempestuous relationship with manager Graeme Souness preventing him from developing as expected; Ian Ferguson (no relation) and veteran Ray Wilkins were often preferred in the position. He also suffered from injuries, including a recurring dislocated shoulder. In 1989–90 he was loaned to Dundee and it became clear his future was not to be at Rangers, although he was very reluctant to leave the club. He played 148 times in all competitions for Rangers, scoring 8 goals.

In August 1990, Heart of Midlothian spent a then club record £750,000 to take Ferguson to Tynecastle. He became a mainstay in the Hearts team over the next three seasons, including 1991–92 when they finished league runners-up. His good performances earned him a move to Sunderland, with manager Terry Butcher (his former captain at Rangers) signing him in a part-exchange deal which saw John Colquhoun return to Hearts.

After two seasons on Wearside, Ferguson moved back to Scotland when Falkirk paid Sunderland £250,000 for his services in 1995. He spent three years with the Bairns before spending a single season (1998–99) with Dunfermline Athletic, brief period with Portadown in the Irish League during the 1999–00 season and a month with Partick Thistle. Ferguson next had a short spell in Australian soccer with Adelaide Force before returning to Scotland to play for a succession of lower league clubs, namely Ross County, Clydebank (scoring once against future club Hamilton), Alloa Athletic, Hamilton Academical and finally Raith Rovers.

=== International ===
His early performances and potential ensured he was fast-tracked into the Scottish international squad in 1988. Ferguson gained two caps during this period, in matches against Malta and Colombia. He also featured five times for the Under-21s and once for the B-team.

== Managerial career ==
While at Clydebank he was briefly appointed player-manager, while he has also served as a coach at Albion Rovers before becoming Stranraer's assistant manager as part of a new management team at Stair Park with Gerry Britton. When Britton left his post as manager for the vacant assistant manager role at Partick Thistle, Ferguson was put in place as caretaker manager before being handed a contract as manager until the end of the 2008–09 season. Although having a bright start as manager, relations between the club and Ferguson had become strained due to his unrealistic expectations for financial support and the club's on-field performances, which led to him leaving the club after an 8–2 home defeat to Stirling Albion., one of the worst home defeats in the club's history.

After leaving Stranraer he had a short spell as manager of junior outfit Glenafton Athletic. On 28 October 2010, Ferguson was named as assistant manager of Dumbarton, however it was announced on 3 November 2010 that he will be unable to fill that role due to media commitments.

== Media career ==
Since leaving Glenafton Athletic, Ferguson has appeared regularly for BBC Radio Scotland as a football pundit. His work with BBC Scotland was cited as his reason for not accepting the role of assistant manager at Dumbarton.

== Personal life ==
Ferguson is the elder brother of Barry Ferguson, who also played for Rangers and Scotland in the same position. The siblings played against each other on three occasions during the 1998–99 season while Derek was with Dunfermline, with 20-year-old Barry scoring at East End Park and 31-year-old Derek making his last appearance at Ibrox.

His son Lewis is also a professional footballer. He signed for Aberdeen in 2018, and scored the winning goal in a League Cup semi-final against Rangers in October of that year.

Ferguson's baby daughter Lauren died from a heart defect at seven weeks of age in 1993; her organs were removed by medical staff at Yorkhill Hospital without parental consent, an issue which inquiries found had affected hundreds of families in the area at the time.

His autobiography, Big Brother, written with Bill Leckie, was published in 2006.

== Honours ==
Rangers

- Scottish Premier Division: 1986–87, 1988–89 (Note: Did not make minimum 10 appearances in 1989–90 title win)
- Scottish League Cup: 1986–87, 1987–88, 1988–89
