= David Holmes (businessman) =

Scottish businessperson (born 1935)

David Scott Holmes
- Born: April 1935 (age 90)
- Occupation: businessperson

David Scott Holmes (born 8 April 1935) is a Scottish businessperson. He is best known as a former chairman and chief executive of Rangers football club.

== Career ==
Holmes was appointed a director of Rangers in November 1985 by the club's then majority shareholder, the Nevada-based businessman Lawrence Marlborough, head of the Lawrence Group of construction companies. This followed several years of internecine squabbling amongst major Rangers shareholders, including Jack Gillespie, John Paton and Tom Dawson. Marlborough had inherited much of his shareholding from John Lawrence, a former Rangers chairman of many years standing. His reputed objective in the mid-1980s was to reinvigorate Rangers after years of under-performance, prior to eventual sale.

To meet this objective, Holmes embarked upon a bold strategy of returning Rangers to the primacy the club had enjoyed throughout most of its history. In doing so, Holmes was able to capitalise on the modernisation of Ibrox stadium in the late 1970s and early 1980s, several years in advance of the upgrading of most comparable British grounds. The ban on English clubs from European competition in the wake of the Heysel Stadium disaster provided Rangers with a further competitive advantage. Both factors proved critical in enabling Graeme Souness, appointed manager at Holmes's behest in 1986, to attract leading English internationals. The appointment of Souness - at the time one of European football's most celebrated players - was a major coup for Holmes, especially in the context of a Scottish league historically characterised by the exodus of leading players.

Souness's appointment saw Rangers secure the league championship in 1986–87 - the first since 1977–78 season. A further championship followed under the Holmes-Souness period in 1988–89. Rising attendances, increased turnover, and a profile heightened by the capture of numerous high-profile English internationalists were widely regarded as evidence of the success of Holmes and Souness in revitalising Rangers.

In November 1988, Lawrence Marlborough's shareholding - and, with it, control of the club - was acquired by the Scottish businessman, David Murray. Holmes continued as chairman until 2 June 1989, at which point he was succeeded by Murray.

Holmes ceased involvement in Rangers shortly thereafter. He subsequently re-entered football as a major shareholder of Falkirk in 1990, but resigned in 1991. He was also briefly managing director at Dundee.

Holmes's involvement in football came part-way through an established business career, principally in construction. Before his time at Rangers, Holmes was chairman and chief executive of John Lawrence, the largest independent house builder in Scotland. In 2003, Holmes founded Timber Kit and Treatment Warehouse Ltd (subsequently renamed European Timber Systems Ltd), a manufacturer of timber frame housing. In 2005, the company became a member of the Gladedale Holdings Plc group of housebuilding companies, of which Holmes is also a director.
