= Ian Durrant =

Scottish footballer & coach (born 1966)

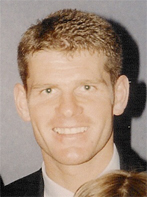
- Durrant in 1994

Personal information
- Full name: Ian Durrant
- Date of birth: 29 October 1966 (age 59)
- Place of birth: Kinning Park, Glasgow, Scotland
- Position: Midfielder

Youth career
- Glasgow United
- 1983–1985: Rangers

Senior career*
| Years | Team | Apps | (Gls) |
| 1985–1998 | Rangers | 246 | (26) |
| 1994 | → Everton (loan) | 5 | (0) |
| 1998–2002 | Kilmarnock | 83 | (8) |
| Total | | 334 | (34) |

International career
| 1986–1988 | Scotland U21 | 4 | (0) |
| 1987–2000 | Scotland | 20 | (0) |

Managerial career
- 2007: Rangers (caretaker)
- 2018: Dumbarton (caretaker)
- * Club domestic league appearances and goals

Ian Durrant (born 29 October 1966) is a Scottish professional football coach and former player who was last a first team coach at Kilwinning Rangers until the end of the 23-24 season.

During his playing career, Durrant played as a midfielder for Rangers for 13 years and was part of the team that won nine successive league championships to equal a record set by rivals Celtic, although he barely played for three years after suffering a knee injury in 1988 due to a horrendous challenge by Neil Simpson of Aberdeen , which injured him for over 2 years and required knee reconstruction.Having established himself as a member of the side. He had a loan spell at Everton in 1994, and finished his career with Kilmarnock. Durrant also played for the Scotland national team, gaining 20 caps over a 12-year period.

== Playing career ==
=== Rangers ===
Durrant started his career at Rangers. He was Ally McCoist's boot boy when the striker first joined the club from Sunderland in 1983.

Durrant made his debut against Greenock Morton in April 1985. The following season, he was a regular fixture in the Rangers team and scored in his first Old Firm match. He displayed his early promise to a wide audience with his performances alongside fellow young midfielder Derek Ferguson in the Scottish League Cup finals of 1986 and 1987 (scoring in both matches and also converting the winning shoot-out penalty in the latter).

In October 1988 Durrant (then aged 21) was seriously injured by Aberdeen player Neil Simpson which tore the cruciate ligaments in his right knee. Durrant did not play competitive football for almost three years. After one aborted return in early 1990, he made his comeback appearance in a reserve fixture in January 1991 against Hibernian and was welcomed back by around 30,000 fans. His league return was also against Hibs towards the end of that season, and he started the crucial winner-takes-all match against Aberdeen in May 1991 which secured the title for Rangers. In 1993 Durrant sued for damages against Simpson, and settled out of court for an undisclosed sum.

Durrant went on to play a part in the 1992–93 UEFA Champions League run (scoring against Marseille at the Stade Velodrome) and helped Rangers equal Celtic's record of nine successive league championships, the last of which was clinched in 1997. Despite his injury problems he played a total of 346 competitive games for the club, scoring 45 goals, and won six League titles, three Scottish Cups and four League Cups.

=== Kilmarnock ===
In 1998, along with Rangers teammate Ally McCoist, Durrant transferred to Kilmarnock. He spent four years at Rugby Park before retiring and becoming coach of the youth team. He made 101 appearances for Killie including seven matches in the UEFA Cup, and the 2001 Scottish League Cup Final. He was also shortlisted for the SPFA Player of the Year in both 1999 and 2000.

=== Scotland ===
Durrant made his international debut on 9 September 1987 against Hungary, eventually winning 20 caps for Scotland. His final match was as a Kilmarnock player, against Republic of Ireland on 30 May 2000.

== Coaching career ==
In 2005, he returned to Rangers as coach of the under-19s and, later, the reserve team. Following the resignation of Paul Le Guen as Rangers manager on 4 January 2007, Durrant was caretaker manager until Walter Smith was appointed manager. He immediately reinstated Barry Ferguson – the club captain who had been deposed by Le Guen – but lost his only game in charge of the first team, a Scottish Cup tie at Dunfermline Athletic. Durrant worked as a coach of the Rangers first team under Walter Smith and Ally McCoist. After McCoist left the club December 2014, Durrant was demoted to a position with the under-20 team. He left Rangers in June 2016.

On 27 January 2017, Durrant was appointed assistant manager to Stephen Aitken at Scottish Championship side Dumbarton, after previous assistant Stephen Farrell took over as manager at Scottish League One club Stranraer. He became joint caretaker manager with Jamie Ewings when Aitken was sacked in October 2018 but left the club following Jim Duffy's appointment. He joined Lowland League club East Kilbride in June 2020, again as assistant manager to Aitken. In February 2023, it was announced Durrant is a part of Chris Aitken's coaching team at West of Scotland Football League Premier Division side Kilwinning Rangers F.C.

== Personal life ==
Durrant was fined £1500 by Rangers in 1987 after his involvement in an incident in a kebab shop after Rangers had won the league championship.

In October 2018, Durrant was filmed shouting "Fuck the Pope" during a Rangers supporters' dinner event in Bothwell attended by former players. He had previously been fined at court in October 1989 for singing sectarian songs and committing a breach of the peace during an incident in Glasgow's Kinning Park in May of that year, while he was out injured (he was in the company of Derek Ferguson who was found not guilty in relation to his involvement).

== Honours ==
=== Player ===
Rangers

- Scottish Premier Division: 1986–87, 1991–92, 1992–93, 1993–94, 1994–95, 1995–96
- Scottish Cup: 1991–92, 1992–93, 1995–96
- Scottish League Cup: 1986–87, 1987–88, 1992–93, 1993–94
