= Davie Kirkwood =

Scottish footballer and manager

Personal information
- Full name: David Kirkwood
- Date of birth: 27 August 1967 (age 59)
- Place of birth: St. Andrews, Scotland
- Position: Midfielder

Senior career*
Years	Team	Apps	(Gls)
1983–1987	East Fife	110	(12)
1987–1989	Rangers	7	(0)
1988–1989	→ East Fife (loan)	5	(2)
1989–1990	Heart of Midlothian	28	(1)
1990–1994	Airdrieonians	104	(21)
1994–2000	Raith Rovers	90	(4)

International career
1989	Scotland U21	1	(0)

Managerial career
- 2011–2012: Wick Academy
- 2012–2015: Brora Rangers
- * Club domestic league appearances and goals

Davie Kirkwood (born 27 August 1967 in St. Andrews) is a Scottish former professional football player and former manager of Brora Rangers.

== Playing career ==
Kirkwood started his career with East Fife and joined Rangers under Graeme Souness in 1987 as a 19-year-old. After a disappointing spell in Glasgow he re-joined The Fifers on loan and signed for Hearts. He played with Airdrieonians and Raith Rovers before retiring. Kirkwood was among the players at Raith to win a League Cup winners medal in 1994.

== Coaching career ==
Kirkwood was involved in youth development at Raith Rovers, Rangers and Ross county where he was Head of Youth Development for 5 years.

On 8 June 2011, Kirkwood was appointed manager of Scottish Highland League side Wick Academy. His first competitive game in charge ended in defeat against local amateur side Halkirk United and were knocked out of the North of Scotland Cup in the first round, in which the previous season Wick were losing finalists. In his first Scottish Cup appearance as manager, Wick thumped Coldstream 9-1 but fell foul to fellow HL side Keith in the 2nd round. Wick finished the season in 8th place which was enough to qualify for the following season Scottish Challenge Cup.

2012-13 kicked off against Kirkwood's former side Raith Rovers in the Scottish Challenge Cup, a tightly contested game where Raith ran out 4-2 winners. Wins at home to Halkirk United and away to Clach saw Wick into the North Cup Semi Finals as well as a Scottish Cup first round win away to Spartans. His time at Wick was to end controversially as he resigned to join arch rivals Brora Rangers, who had been subject to investment from a local business man.

Kirkwood's first three games with Brora ended in defeat; a 2–1 win away to Keith marked his first victory. Kirkwood left Brora in July 2015 and was replaced by Richard Brittain.

=== Managerial statistics ===
Club	Nat	From	To	Competitive Record							
Club	Nat	From	To	G	W	D	L	GF	GA	GD	Win %
Wick Academy	(Scotland)	26 July 2011	31 August 2012	45	22	8	15	111	77	+34	48.89
Brora Rangers	(Scotland)	13 September 2012	Present	33	17	3	13	92	50	+42	51.52

Updated 18 May 2013
