= Nicky Walker =

Scottish footballer

Personal information
- Full name: Joseph Nicol Walker
- Date of birth: 29 September 1962 (age 64)
- Place of birth: Aberdeen, Scotland
- Position: Goalkeeper

Youth career
- Elgin City

Senior career*
| Years | Team | Apps | (Gls) |
| 1981–1982 | Leicester City | 6 | (0) |
| 1982–1983 | Motherwell | 30 | (0) |
| 1983–1990 | Rangers | 75 | (0) |
| 1986–1987 | → Falkirk (loan) | 2 | (0) |
| 1987–1988 | → Dunfermline Athletic (loan) | 1 | (0) |
| 1990–1994 | Heart of Midlothian | 50 | (0) |
| 1991–1992 | → Burnley (loan) | 6 | (0) |
| 1994–1996 | Partick Thistle | 53 | (0) |
| 1996–1997 | Aberdeen | 19 | (0) |
| 1997–2001 | Ross County | 112 | (0) |
| 2001–2002 | Inverness Caledonian Thistle | 27 | (0) |
| Total | | 379 | (0) |

International career
| 1993–1996 | Scotland | 2 | (0) |
- * Club domestic league appearances and goals

Joseph Nicol Walker (born 29 September 1962) is a Scottish former professional footballer, who played as a goalkeeper for several clubs in Scotland and England. Walker was selected for many Scotland squads during the 1990s, earning two international caps.

== Football career ==
=== Club ===
A product of Highland League club Elgin City, Walker signed for Leicester City aged 17. He didn't settle in the Midlands though, and returned to Scotland within the year, signing for Motherwell in 1981. Two years later he signed for Rangers, where he soon established himself as their first choice goalkeeper. The arrival of Chris Woods as part of the Souness revolution meant that Walker lost his place. Walker did play in the 1987 Scottish League Cup Final against Aberdeen, which Rangers won after a penalty shoot-out, while injuries to Woods the following season also meant Walker deputised in twelve games to earn a Scottish League title medal.

Walker joined Heart of Midlothian in a £125,000 deal in 1990. His time at Tynecastle developed into a see-saw battle with Henry Smith for the starting goalkeeping role, both men earning international recognition when in the Hearts first team but enduring significant spells on the sidelines. Smith eventually won the duel and, after a loan spell with Burnley, Walker moved to Partick Thistle in 1994 in a part-exchange deal for Craig Nelson.

Firhill proved a happy home for Walker, and he enjoyed his most consistent period in the West of Glasgow. When Thistle were relegated in 1996, his form was sufficient to earn a £60,000 move to high-flying Aberdeen. He left Pittodrie in 1999 after he was supplanted by Derek Stillie, winding down his career with short spells at Ross County and Inverness Caledonian Thistle.

=== International ===
Walker earned two international caps for Scotland, making his debut in a 1–0 defeat by Germany in 1993. His only other appearance was three years later, against the United States. Walker was selected as a reserve goalkeeper in the Scotland squad for UEFA Euro 1996.

== Personal life ==
Walker's family company is Walkers Shortbread, based in the Speyside village of Aberlour, Morayshire, in north east Scotland. He joined the firm following his retirement from football, becoming a director.
