= 1995–96 Coventry City F.C. season =

Coventry City F.C.
1995–96 season
- Chairman: Bryan Richardson
- Manager: Ron Atkinson
- Stadium: Highfield Road
- FA Premier League: 16th
- FA Cup: Fourth round
- League Cup: Fourth round
- Top goalscorer: League: Dion Dublin (14); All: Dion Dublin (16)
- Highest home attendance: 23,400 vs Manchester United (22 November 1995, FA Premier League)
- Lowest home attendance: 8,915 vs Hull City (20 September 1995, League Cup)
- Average home league attendance: 18,507
Home colours	Away colours

During the 1995–96 English football season, Coventry City competed in the FA Premier League.

== Season summary ==
Once again, Coventry City defied the odds after a season of struggle. This time they had the determination of manager Ron Atkinson and the regular supply of goals from Dion Dublin to thank for their survival. They hit the headlines in December with a spectacular 5–0 win over defending champions Blackburn, but the defence leaked too many goals for the Sky Blues to progress beyond 16th place in the final table, surviving only on goal difference to secure a 30th successive season of top flight football. Tragedy struck the club as promising defender David Busst suffered a harrowing broken-leg injury during a clash with Denis Irwin and Brian McClair from a corner in the 1–0 defeat at Manchester United, often considered one of the worst football injuries in history, which ultimately ended his career. He was diagnosed with MRSA later on from his injury in hospital, forcing him to premature retirement later that year.

New to the side for the season were defender Paul Williams from Derby County (not to be confused with another defender, Paul Williams, who departed the club the following week, nor with yet another Paul Williams, a Northern Irish forward who played for the club on loan from West Brom in the 92-93 season); Brazilian midfielder Isaías; and 21-year-old Leeds United striker Noel Whelan.

Atkinson splashed out more than £15 million on new players during the close season, as he looked to build a Coventry side which was capable of matching the high placing of his old club Aston Villa, one of Coventry's deadliest rivals.

== Final league table ==
Pos	Team	Pld	W	D	L	GF	GA	GD	Pts	Qualification or relegation
14	Wimbledon	38	10	11	17	55	70	−15	41	
15	Sheffield Wednesday	38	10	10	18	48	61	−13	40	
16	Coventry City	38	8	14	16	42	60	−18	38	
17	Southampton	38	9	11	18	34	52	−18	38	
18	Manchester City (R)	38	9	11	18	33	58	−25	38	Relegation to Football League First Division

Source: Premier League
Rules for classification: 1) points; 2) goal difference; 3) number of goals scored.
(R) Relegated

Results summary

Overall								Home						Away					
Pld	W	D	L	GF	GA	GD	Pts	W	D	L	GF	GA	GD	W	D	L	GF	GA	GD
38	8	14	16	42	60	−18	38	6	7	6	21	23	−2	2	7	10	21	37	−16

Source: Statto

Results by round

Round	1	2	3	4	5	6	7	8	9	10	11	12	13	14	15	16	17	18	19	20	21	22	23	24	25	26	27	28	29	30	31	32	33	34	35	36	37	38
Ground	A	H	H	A	H	A	A	H	A	H	A	H	A	H	H	A	H	A	H	A	H	H	A	A	A	H	H	H	A	H	A	A	H	A	H	A	A	H
Result	L	W	D	D	D	L	L	L	D	L	L	L	D	L	D	L	W	L	W	W	D	L	D	L	D	W	D	D	D	L	L	L	W	L	W	D	W	D
Position	20	11	11	10	11	14	16	16	16	17	18	19	19	20	19	20	19	19	19	17	17	17	17	18	18	17	17	16	15	16	18	19	18	19	18	17	16	16

Source: Statto.com
A = Away; H = Home; W = Win; D = Draw; L = Loss

== Results ==
Coventry City's score comes first

=== Legend ===
Win	Draw	Loss

=== FA Premier League ===
Date	Opponent	Venue	Result	Attendance	Scorers
19 August 1995	Newcastle United	A	0-3	36,485	
23 August 1995	Manchester City	H	2-1	15,957	Telfer, Dublin
26 August 1995	Arsenal	H	0-0	20,065	
30 August 1995	Chelsea	A	2-2	24,398	Isaías, Ndlovu
9 September 1995	Nottingham Forest	H	1-1	17,219	Dublin
16 September 1995	Middlesbrough	A	1-2	27,882	Isaías
23 September 1995	Blackburn Rovers	A	1-5	24,382	Ndlovu
30 September 1995	Aston Villa	H	0-3	20,987	
14 October 1995	Liverpool	A	0-0	39,079	
21 October 1995	Sheffield Wednesday	H	0-1	13,998	
28 October 1995	Leeds United	A	1-3	30,161	Dublin
4 November 1995	Tottenham Hotspur	H	2-3	17,545	Dublin, Williams
19 November 1995	Queens Park Rangers	A	1-1	11,189	Dublin
22 November 1995	Manchester United	H	0-4	23,400	
25 November 1995	Wimbledon	H	3-3	12,523	Heald (own goal), Dublin, Rennie
4 December 1995	Sheffield Wednesday	A	3-4	16,229	Dublin (3)
9 December 1995	Blackburn Rovers	H	5-0	13,376	Busst, Dublin, Rennie, Ndlovu, Salako
16 December 1995	Aston Villa	A	1-4	28,486	Dublin
23 December 1995	Everton	H	2-1	16,639	Busst, Whelan
30 December 1995	Bolton Wanderers	A	2-1	16,678	Whelan, Salako (pen)
1 January 1996	Southampton	H	1-1	16,818	Whelan
14 January 1996	Newcastle United	H	0-1	20,547	
20 January 1996	Manchester City	A	1-1	25,710	Dublin
31 January 1996	West Ham United	A	2-3	18,884	Whelan, Dublin
3 February 1996	Arsenal	A	1-1	35,623	Whelan
10 February 1996	Chelsea	H	1-0	20,639	Whelan
24 February 1996	Middlesbrough	H	0-0	18,810	
2 March 1996	West Ham United	H	2-2	17,459	Salako, Whelan
9 March 1996	Everton	A	2-2	34,517	Daish, Williams
16 March 1996	Bolton Wanderers	H	0-2	17,226	
25 March 1996	Southampton	A	0-1	14,461	
30 March 1996	Tottenham Hotspur	A	1-3	26,808	Dublin
6 April 1996	Liverpool	H	1-0	23,137	Whelan
8 April 1996	Manchester United	A	0-1	50,332	
13 April 1996	Queens Park Rangers	H	1-0	22,910	Jess
17 April 1996	Nottingham Forest	A	0-0	24,629	
27 April 1996	Wimbledon	A	2-0	15,540	Ndlovu (2)
5 May 1996	Leeds United	H	0-0	22,769	

=== FA Cup ===
Round	Date	Opponent	Venue	Result	Attendance	Goalscorers
R3	6 January 1996	Plymouth Argyle	A	3-1	17,721	Pickering, Telfer, Salako
R4	7 February 1996	Manchester City	H	2-2	18,709	Whelan, Dublin
R4R	14 February 1996	Manchester City	A	1-2	22,419	Dublin

=== League Cup ===
Round	Date	Opponent	Venue	Result	Attendance	Goalscorers
R2 1st Leg	20 September 1995	Hull City	H	2-0	8,915	Richardson, Lamptey
R2 2nd Leg	4 October 1995	Hull City	A	1-0 (won 3–0 on agg)	6,929	Lamptey
R3	25 October 1995	Tottenham Hotspur	H	3-2	18,227	Busst, Ndlovu (pen), Salako
R4	29 November 1995	Wolverhampton Wanderers	A	1-2	24,628	Williams

== Squad ==
Note: Flags indicate national team as defined under FIFA eligibility rules; some limited exceptions apply. Players may hold more than one non-FIFA nationality.

No.	Pos.	Nation	Player
1	GK	ENG	Steve Ogrizovic
2	DF	ENG	Brian Borrows
3	DF	ENG	David Burrows
4	DF	ENG	Paul Williams
5	DF	SCO	David Rennie
6	MF	ENG	Kevin Richardson
7	MF	SCO	Paul Telfer
8	FW	BRA	Isaías
9	FW	ZIM	Peter Ndlovu
10	FW	ENG	Dion Dublin
11	MF	ENG	John Salako
12	DF	ENG	Dave Busst
13	GK	AUS	John Filan
14	FW	ENG	Noel Whelan
16	MF	SCO	Eoin Jess
17	DF	ENG	Ally Pickering
18	DF	ENG	Marcus Hall

No.	Pos.	Nation	Player
19	FW	ENG	Iyseden Christie
20	DF	ENG	Steve Morgan
21	MF	POR	Carlita
22	MF	IRL	Willie Boland
23	GK	SCO	Jonathan Gould
24	DF	ENG	Richard Shaw
25	DF	SCO	Gary Gillespie
26	MF	SCO	Gordon Strachan (player-manager)
27	MF	GHA	Nii Lamptey
28	FW	ENG	Darren Huckerby
29	GK	ENG	Colin Hunwick
30	DF	IRL	Liam Daish
31	DF	IRL	Lorcan Costello
32	FW	ENG	Andy Ducros
33	MF	ENG	Sam Shilton
35	DF	ENG	Adam Willis

=== Left club during season ===
Note: Flags indicate national team as defined under FIFA eligibility rules; some limited exceptions apply. Players may hold more than one non-FIFA nationality.

No.	Pos.	Nation	Player
14	MF	WAL	Leigh Jenkinson (to St Johnstone)
15	MF	ENG	Paul Cook (to Tranmere Rovers)
16	MF	ENG	Julian Darby (to West Bromwich Albion)

No.	Pos.	Nation	Player
28	FW	ENG	Jamie Barnwell-Edinboro (to Cambridge United)
30	GK	ENG	Peter Shilton (to West Ham United)
34	DF	ENG	Chris Whyte (on loan from Birmingham City)

=== Reserve squad ===
Note: Flags indicate national team as defined under FIFA eligibility rules; some limited exceptions apply. Players may hold more than one non-FIFA nationality.

No.	Pos.	Nation	Player
—	GK	ENG	Neil Cutler (on loan from West Bromwich Albion)
—	DF	IRL	Colin Hawkins

No.	Pos.	Nation	Player
—	DF	IRL	Barry Prenderville
—	MF	SCO	Gavin Strachan

== Transfers ==
=== In ===
Date	Pos	Name	From	Fee
7 June 1995	MF	Calita	Farense	£250,000
5 July 1995	FW	Isaías	Benfica	£500,000
11 July 1995	MF	Paul Telfer	Luton Town	£1,150,000
3 August 1995	MF	John Salako	Crystal Palace	£1,500,000
6 August 1995	DF	Paul Williams	Derby County	£750,000
12 February 1996	DF	Liam Daish	Birmingham City	£1,500,000
23 February 1996	MF	Eoin Jess	Aberdeen	£2,000,000

=== Out ===
Date	Pos	Name	To	Fee
26 June 1995	MF	Mike Marsh	Galatasaray	£500,000
25 July 1995	DF	Steven Pressley	Dundee United	£750,000
28 July 1995	MF	Sandy Robertson	Dundee United	£250,000
2 August 1995	GK	Martin Davies	Cambridge United	Free transfer
10 August 1995	DF	Paul Williams	Plymouth Argyle	£50,000
11 August 1995	MF	Sean Flynn	Derby County	£225,000
15 September 1995	FW	John Williams	Wycombe Wanderers	£150,000
24 November 1995	MF	Julian Darby	West Bromwich Albion	£250,000
8 December 1995	MF	Leigh Jenkinson	St Johnstone	Signed
11 January 1996	GK	Peter Shilton	West Ham United	Free transfer
29 February 1996	MF	Paul Cook	Tranmere Rovers	£250,000

Transfers in: ▼£6,150,000
Transfers out: ▲£2,425,000
Total spending: ▼£3,725,000
