= 1994–95 Coventry City F.C. season =

Coventry City
1994–95 season
- Chairman: Bryan Richardson
- Manager: Phil Neal (until 14 February); Ron Atkinson (from 15 February)
- Stadium: Highfield Road
- Premiership: 16th
- FA Cup: Fourth round
- League Cup: Third round
- Top goalscorer: League: Dublin (13); All: Dublin (16)
- Highest home attendance: 21,885 vs Manchester United (1 May 1995, Premier League)
- Lowest home attendance: 8,561 vs Wrexham (5 Oct 1994, League Cup)
- Average home league attendance: 15,980

During the 1994–95 English football season, Coventry City competed in the FA Premier League.

== Season summary ==
In the 1994–95 season, Coventry struggled for most of the campaign despite the £2million arrival of striker Dion Dublin from Manchester United on 9 September, and Neal was sacked on 14 February 1995 despite a 2–0 away win over fellow strugglers Crystal Palace three days earlier, which saw them 17th in the Premier League and two places above the relegation zone. Neal's successor Ron Atkinson ensured the Sky Blues' survival.

== Kit ==
Coventry City's kit was manufactured by Pony and sponsored by Peugeot.

== Final league table ==
Pos	Team	Pld	W	D	L	GF	GA	GD	Pts	Qualification or relegation
14	West Ham United	42	13	11	18	44	48	−4	50	
15	Everton	42	11	17	14	44	51	−7	50	Qualification for the Cup Winners' Cup first round (Note: Everton qualified for the Cup Winners' Cup as FA Cup winners.)
16	Coventry City	42	12	14	16	44	62	−18	50	
17	Manchester City	42	12	13	17	53	64	−11	49	
18	Aston Villa	42	11	15	16	51	56	−5	48	

Source: Premier League
Rules for classification: 1) points; 2) goal difference; 3) number of goals scored.
Notes:

Results summary

Overall								Home						Away					
Pld	W	D	L	GF	GA	GD	Pts	W	D	L	GF	GA	GD	W	D	L	GF	GA	GD
42	12	14	16	44	62	−18	50	7	7	7	23	25	−2	5	7	9	21	37	−16

Source: Statto

Results by round

Round	1	2	3	4	5	6	7	8	9	10	11	12	13	14	15	16	17	18	19	20	21	22	23	24	25	26	27	28	29	30	31	32	33	34	35	36	37	38	39	40	41	42
Ground	H	A	A	H	A	H	H	A	H	A	A	H	H	A	H	A	H	A	H	H	A	H	A	A	H	A	H	A	H	H	A	A	H	A	A	H	H	A	H	A	A	H
Result	D	L	L	L	D	W	L	D	W	W	L	W	L	D	W	W	D	L	D	D	L	L	L	D	L	D	D	W	W	W	D	D	D	W	L	L	W	L	L	L	W	D
Position	9	19	21	21	20	18	20	21	17	13	15	13	14	15	13	10	10	11	12	12	15	17	17	17	19	19	20	17	13	12	12	11	12	9	10	12	12	15	15	18	15	16

Source: Statto.com
A = Away; H = Home; W = Win; D = Draw; L = Loss

== Results ==
Coventry City's score comes first

=== Legend ===
Win	Draw	Loss

=== FA Premier League ===
Date	Opponent	Venue	Result	Attendance	Scorers
20 August 1994	Wimbledon	H	1–1	10,962	Busst
24 August 1994	Newcastle United	A	0–4	34,163	
27 August 1994	Blackburn Rovers	A	0–4	21,657	
29 August 1994	Aston Villa	H	0–1	12,218	
10 September 1994	Queens Park Rangers	A	2–2	11,398	Cook, Dublin
17 September 1994	Leeds United	H	2–1	15,389	Cook (pen), Dublin
24 September 1994	Southampton	H	1–3	11,784	Dublin
3 October 1994	Leicester City	A	2–2	19,372	Wegerle, Dublin
10 October 1994	Ipswich Town	H	2–0	9,526	Cook (pen), Wark (own goal)
15 October 1994	Everton	A	2–0	28,233	Dublin, Wegerle
23 October 1994	Arsenal	A	1–2	31,725	Wegerle (pen)
29 October 1994	Manchester City	H	1–0	15,804	Dublin
2 November 1994	Crystal Palace	H	1–4	10,732	Dublin
6 November 1994	Chelsea	A	2–2	17,090	Ndlovu, Dublin
19 November 1994	Norwich City	H	1–0	11,885	Jones
26 November 1994	West Ham United	A	1–0	17,251	Busst
3 December 1994	Liverpool	H	1–1	21,029	Flynn
10 December 1994	Wimbledon	A	0–2	7,349	
17 December 1994	Newcastle United	H	0–0	17,233	
26 December 1994	Nottingham Forest	H	0–0	19,224	
28 December 1994	Sheffield Wednesday	A	1–5	26,056	Ndlovu (pen)
31 December 1994	Tottenham Hotspur	H	0–4	19,965	
3 January 1995	Manchester United	A	0–2	43,130	
14 January 1995	Manchester City	A	0–0	20,632	
21 January 1995	Arsenal	H	0–1	14,468	
25 January 1995	Norwich City	A	2–2	14,024	Jenkinson, Dublin
4 February 1995	Chelsea	H	2–2	13,429	Flynn, Burley (own goal)
11 February 1995	Crystal Palace	A	2–0	11,871	Jones, Dublin
18 February 1995	West Ham United	H	2–0	17,556	Ndlovu, Marsh
25 February 1995	Leicester City	H	4–2	20,633	Flynn (2), Marsh, Ndlovu
4 March 1995	Southampton	A	0–0	14,505	
6 March 1995	Aston Villa	A	0–0	26,186	
11 March 1995	Blackburn Rovers	H	1–1	18,547	Dublin
14 March 1995	Liverpool	A	3–2	27,183	Ndlovu (3, 1 pen)
18 March 1995	Leeds United	A	0–3	29,179	
1 April 1995	Queens Park Rangers	H	0–1	15,740	
15 April 1995	Sheffield Wednesday	H	2–0	15,710	Dublin, Ndlovu
17 April 1995	Nottingham Forest	A	0–2	26,253	
1 May 1995	Manchester United	H	2–3	21,885	Pressley, Ndlovu
6 May 1995	Ipswich Town	A	0–2	12,893	
9 May 1995	Tottenham Hotspur	A	3–1	24,930	Ndlovu (2, 1 pen), Dublin
14 May 1995	Everton	H	0–0	21,814	

=== FA Cup ===
Round	Date	Opponent	Venue	Result	Attendance	Goalscorers
R3	7 January 1995	West Bromwich Albion	H	1–1	16,555	Wegerle (pen)
R3R	18 January 1995	West Bromwich Albion	A	2–1	23,230	Dublin, Ndlovu
R4	28 January 1995	Norwich City	H	0–0	15,101	
R4R	8 February 1995	Norwich City	A	1–3 (a.e.t.)	14,673	Ndlovu

=== League Cup ===
Round	Date	Opponent	Venue	Result	Attendance	Goalscorers
R2 1st Leg	20 September 1994	Wrexham	A	2–1	5,286	Darby, Flynn
R2 2nd Leg	5 October 1994	Wrexham	H	3–2 (won 5–3 on agg)	8,561	Dublin (2), Wegerle
R3	26 October 1994	Blackburn Rovers	A	0–2	14,538	

== Squad ==
Squad at end of season

Note: Flags indicate national team as defined under FIFA eligibility rules; some limited exceptions apply. Players may hold more than one non-FIFA nationality.

No.	Pos.	Nation	Player
1	GK	ENG	Steve Ogrizovic
2	DF	ENG	Brian Borrows (captain)
3	DF	ENG	Steve Morgan
4	MF	ENG	Julian Darby
5	DF	SCO	David Rennie
6	DF	SCO	Steven Pressley
7	MF	ENG	Sean Flynn
8	FW	USA	Roy Wegerle
9	FW	ZIM	Peter Ndlovu
10	FW	ENG	Micky Quinn
11	MF	IRL	Willie Boland
12	FW	ENG	John Williams
13	GK	SCO	Jonathan Gould
14	MF	ENG	Leigh Jenkinson
15	MF	ENG	Paul Cook
16	DF	ENG	Paul Williams

No.	Pos.	Nation	Player
17	DF	ENG	Ally Pickering
18	MF	SCO	Sandy Robertson
19	FW	ENG	Dion Dublin
20	DF	ENG	David Busst
21	MF	IRL	Tony Sheridan
22	DF	SCO	Gary Gillespie
23	GK	WAL	Martin Davies
24	MF	USA	Cobi Jones
25	DF	ENG	Marcus Hall
26	MF	IRL	Gavin O'Toole
27	MF	ENG	Mike Marsh
28	MF	ENG	Kevin Richardson
29	DF	ENG	David Burrows
30	GK	AUS	John Filan
31	MF	SCO	Gordon Strachan

=== Left club during season ===
Note: Flags indicate national team as defined under FIFA eligibility rules; some limited exceptions apply. Players may hold more than one non-FIFA nationality.

No.	Pos.	Nation	Player
6	DF	IRL	Phil Babb (to Liverpool)

=== Reserve squad ===
Note: Flags indicate national team as defined under FIFA eligibility rules; some limited exceptions apply. Players may hold more than one non-FIFA nationality.

No.	Pos.	Nation	Player
—	DF	IRL	Barry Prenderville
—	DF	ENG	Jason Smith

No.	Pos.	Nation	Player
—	FW	ENG	Andy Ducros
—	DF	SCO	Jason Kilgallon

== Transfers ==
=== In ===
Date	Pos	Name	From	Fee
18 August 1994	MF	Paul Cook	Wolverhampton Wanderers	Transfer
28 August 1994	DF	Gary Gillespie	Celtic	Free transfer
9 September 1994	FW	Dion Dublin	Manchester United	£2,000,000
19 October 1994	DF	Steven Pressley	Rangers	£600,000
30 December 1994	MF	Mike Marsh	West Ham United	£450,000
16 February 1995	MF	Kevin Richardson	Aston Villa	£300,000
2 March 1995	DF	David Burrows	Everton	£1,100,000
2 March 1995	GK	John Filan	Cambridge United	£300,000
22 March 1995	MF	Gordon Strachan	Leeds United	Free transfer

=== Out ===
Date	Pos	Name	To	Fee
1 June 1994	DF	Peter Atherton	Sheffield Wednesday	£800,000
1 July 1994	DF	Lee Hirst	Alfreton Town	Free transfer
17 August 1994	FW	John Gayle	Burnley	£70,000
18 August 1994	FW	Mick Harford	Wimbledon	£50,000
1 September 1994	DF	Phil Babb	Liverpool	£3,600,000
13 October 1994	MF	Lloyd McGrath	Portsmouth	Free transfer

Transfers in: ▼£4,750,000
Transfers out: ▲£4,520,000
Total spending: ▼£230,000

== Awards ==
- PFA Merit Award: Gordon Strachan
