= 1996–97 Coventry City F.C. season =

Coventry City F.C.
1996–97 season
- Chairman: Bryan Richardson
- Manager: Ron Atkinson (until 5 November); Gordon Strachan (from 5 November)
- Stadium: Highfield Road
- FA Premier League: 17th
- FA Cup: Fifth round
- League Cup: Third round
- Top goalscorer: Dion Dublin (13)
- Highest home attendance: 23,085 vs Manchester United (18 Jan 1997, FA Premier League)
- Lowest home attendance: 11,828 vs Birmingham City (18 Sep 1996, League Cup)
- Average home league attendance: 19,625

During the 1996–97 English football season, Coventry City F.C. competed in the FA Premier League.

== Season summary ==
Manager Ron Atkinson stepped up to the role of Director of Football at struggling Coventry City in early November, with assistant Gordon Strachan stepping up to the manager's seat. Coventry climbed to 11th place in January, but then a decline set in and defeat in the penultimate game of the season made Coventry's 30-year stay in the top appear to be over. However, with a win over Tottenham Hotspur on the final day of the season and losses for Sunderland and Middlesbrough, the Sky Blues pulled off a survival act to book themselves a 31st successive top flight campaign. The key player in the act was striker Dion Dublin, who scored 14 FA Premier League goals to attract attention from several larger clubs and encourage calls for an international call-up from many observers.

However, Coventry only ultimately avoided relegation due to the three-point deduction imposed upon Middlesbrough, who had been penalised in mid-season for cancelling a fixture at short notice.

== Final league table ==
Pos	Team	Pld	W	D	L	GF	GA	GD	Pts	Qualification or relegation
15	Everton	38	10	12	16	44	57	−13	42	
16	Southampton	38	10	11	17	50	56	−6	41	
17	Coventry City	38	9	14	15	38	54	−16	41	
18	Sunderland (R)	38	10	10	18	35	53	−18	40	Relegation to the Football League First Division
19	Middlesbrough (R)	38	10	12	16	51	60	−9	39 (Note: Middlesbrough were docked three points for failing to fulfill their original fixture at Blackburn Rovers on 21 December 1996.)	Relegation to the Football League First Division

Source: Premier League
Rules for classification: 1) points; 2) goal difference; 3) number of goals scored.
(R) Relegated

== Results ==
Coventry City's score comes first

=== Legend ===
Win	Draw	Loss

=== FA Premier League ===
Date	Opponent	Venue	Result	Attendance	Scorers
17 August 1996	Nottingham Forest	H	0–3	19,468	
21 August 1996	West Ham United	A	1–1	21,580	McAllister
24 August 1996	Chelsea	A	0–2	25,024	
4 September 1996	Liverpool	H	0–1	23,021	
7 September 1996	Middlesbrough	A	0–4	29,811	
14 September 1996	Leeds United	H	2–1	17,297	Salako, Whelan
21 September 1996	Sunderland	A	0–1	19,459	
28 September 1996	Blackburn Rovers	H	0–0	17,032	
13 October 1996	Southampton	H	1–1	15,485	Dublin
19 October 1996	Arsenal	A	0–0	38,140	
26 October 1996	Sheffield Wednesday	H	0–0	17,267	
4 November 1996	Everton	A	1–1	31,477	McAllister
16 November 1996	Wimbledon	A	2–2	10,307	Whelan, Dublin
23 November 1996	Aston Villa	H	1–2	21,340	Dublin
30 November 1996	Derby County	A	1–2	18,042	Dublin
7 December 1996	Tottenham Hotspur	H	1–2	19,675	Whelan
17 December 1996	Newcastle United	H	2–1	21,538	Huckerby, McAllister
21 December 1996	Leicester City	A	2–0	20,038	Dublin (2)
26 December 1996	Leeds United	A	3–1	36,465	Huckerby, Dublin, McAllister (pen)
28 December 1996	Middlesbrough	H	3–0	20,617	Huckerby, McAllister (pen), Liddle (own goal)
1 January 1997	Sunderland	H	2–2	17,700	Dublin, Daish
11 January 1997	Blackburn Rovers	A	0–4	24,055	
18 January 1997	Manchester United	H	0–2	23,085	
29 January 1997	Nottingham Forest	A	1–0	22,619	Huckerby
1 February 1997	Sheffield Wednesday	A	0–0	21,793	
19 February 1997	Aston Villa	A	1–2	30,409	Staunton (own goal)
22 February 1997	Everton	H	0–0	19,497	
1 March 1997	Manchester United	A	1–3	55,230	Huckerby
3 March 1997	Wimbledon	H	1–1	15,273	Dublin
8 March 1997	Leicester City	H	0–0	19,220	
15 March 1997	Newcastle United	A	0–4	36,571	
22 March 1997	West Ham United	H	1–3	22,291	Rieper (own goal)
6 April 1997	Liverpool	A	2–1	40,079	Whelan, Dublin
9 April 1997	Chelsea	H	3–1	19,917	Dublin, Williams, Whelan
19 April 1997	Southampton	A	2–2	15,251	Ndlovu, Whelan
21 April 1997	Arsenal	H	1–1	19,998	Dublin
3 May 1997	Derby County	H	1–2	22,839	McAllister (pen)
11 May 1997	Tottenham Hotspur	A	2–1	33,029	Dublin, Williams

=== FA Cup ===
Round	Date	Opponent	Venue	Result	Attendance	Goalscorers
R3	25 January 1997	Woking	H	1–1	16,040	Jess
R3R	4 February 1997	Woking	A	2–1	6,000	Whelan, Foster (own goal)
R4	15 February 1997	Blackburn Rovers	A	2–1	21,123	Jess, Huckerby
R5	26 February 1997	Derby County	A	2–3	18,003	Huckerby, Whelan

=== League Cup ===
Round	Date	Opponent	Venue	Result	Attendance	Goalscorers
R2 1st Leg	18 September 1996	Birmingham City	H	1–1	11,828	Daish
R2 2nd Leg	24 September 1996	Birmingham City	A	1–0	15,281	McAllister
R3	22 October 1996	Gillingham	A	2–2	10,603	Telfer (2)
R3R	13 November 1996	Gillingham	H	0–1	12,639	

== First-team squad ==
Squad at end of season

Note: Flags indicate national team as defined under FIFA eligibility rules; some limited exceptions apply. Players may hold more than one non-FIFA nationality.

No.	Pos.	Nation	Player
1	GK	ENG	Steve Ogrizovic
2	DF	ENG	Richard Shaw
3	DF	ENG	David Burrows
4	DF	ENG	Paul Williams
5	DF	IRL	Liam Daish
6	MF	ENG	Kevin Richardson
7	MF	SCO	Eoin Jess
8	MF	ENG	Noel Whelan
9	FW	ENG	Dion Dublin
10	MF	SCO	Gary McAllister (captain)
11	MF	ENG	John Salako
12	MF	ENG	Paul Telfer
13	GK	AUS	John Filan
14	FW	ZIM	Peter Ndlovu
15	FW	BRA	Isaías
16	DF	ENG	Brian Borrows
17	MF	IRL	Willie Boland
18	DF	ENG	Marcus Hall
19	FW	ENG	Iyseden Christie
20	MF	NIR	Michael O'Neill

No.	Pos.	Nation	Player
21	FW	ENG	Andy Ducros
22	MF	IRL	Gavin O'Toole
23	DF	UKR	Oleksandr Yevtushok
25	DF	IRL	Gary Breen
26	MF	SCO	Gordon Strachan (player-manager)
27	MF	NIR	Chris McMenamin
28	FW	ENG	Darren Huckerby
29	DF	ENG	Scott Goodwin
30	DF	IRL	Lorcan Costello
31	DF	ENG	Adam Willis
32	DF	IRL	Barry Prenderville
33	MF	ENG	Brett Healy
34	DF	IRL	Colin Hawkins
35	FW	ENG	Craig Faulconbridge
36	DF	ENG	Carl Nolan
37	MF	ENG	Sam Shilton
38	MF	ENG	Tim Blake
39	MF	ENG	Paul Bailey
40	DF	ENG	Jamie Williams

=== Left club during season ===
Note: Flags indicate national team as defined under FIFA eligibility rules; some limited exceptions apply. Players may hold more than one non-FIFA nationality.

No.	Pos.	Nation	Player
24	DF	BEL	Régis Genaux (to Udinese)

=== Reserve squad ===
Note: Flags indicate national team as defined under FIFA eligibility rules; some limited exceptions apply. Players may hold more than one non-FIFA nationality.

No.	Pos.	Nation	Player
-	DF	IRL	Barry Quinn
-	MF	ENG	John Eustace

No.	Pos.	Nation	Player
-	MF	SCO	Gavin Strachan

== Transfers ==
=== In ===
Date	Pos.	Name	From	Fee
26 July 1996	MF	(Scotland) Gary McAllister	(England) Leeds United	£3,000,000
10 August 1996	DF	(Belgium) Régis Genaux	(Belgium) Standard Liège	£750,000
23 November 1996	FW	(England) Darren Huckerby	(England) Newcastle United	£1,000,000
30 January 1997	DF	(Republic of Ireland) Gary Breen	(England) Birmingham City	£2,500,000
30 January 1997	DF	(Ukraine) Oleksandr Yevtushok	(Ukraine) Dnipro Dnipropetrovsk	£800,000
21 May 1997	FW	(England) Simon Haworth	(Wales) Cardiff City	£500,000
19 June 1997	MF	(Norway) Trond Egil Soltvedt	(Norway) Rosenborg	£500,000
4 July 1997	FW	(Bermuda) Kyle Lightbourne	(England) Walsall	£500,000
7 July 1997	GK	(Sweden) Magnus Hedman	(Sweden) AIK	Free
9 July 1997	MF	(Denmark) Martin Johansen	(Denmark) Copenhagen	Free

=== Out ===
Date	Pos.	Name	To	Fee
5 August 1996	DF	(England) David Rennie	(England) Northampton Town	Free
15 August 1996	DF	(England) Ally Pickering	(England) Stoke City	£280,000
28 January 1997	DF	(Belgium) Régis Genaux	(Italy) Udinese	£800,000
1 July 1997	MF	(Northern Ireland) Chris McMenamin	(England) Peterborough United	Free
4 July 1997	MF	(Scotland) Eoin Jess	(Scotland) Aberdeen	£700,000
14 July 1997	FW	(Zimbabwe) Peter Ndlovu	(England) Birmingham City	£1,600,000
14 July 1997	GK	(England) Neil Wypior	(England) West Bromwich Albion	Undisclosed

Transfers in: ▼£6,550,000
Transfers out: ▲£3,380,000
Total spending: ▼£3,170,000

== Statistics ==
=== Appearances and goals ===
No.	Pos	Nat	Player	Total		FA Premier League		FA Cup		League Cup	
No.	Pos	Nat	Player	Apps	Goals	Apps	Goals	Apps	Goals	Apps	Goals
Goalkeepers
1	GK	(England) ENG	Steve Ogrizovic	46	0	38	0	4	0	4	0
13	GK	(Australia) AUS	John Filan	1	0	0+1	0	0	0	0	0
Defenders
2	DF	(Republic of Ireland) IRL	Richard Shaw	42	0	35	0	4	0	3	0
3	DF	(England) ENG	David Burrows	21	0	18+1	0	0	0	2	0
4	DF	(England) ENG	Paul Williams	38	2	29+3	2	4	0	2	0
5	DF	(Republic of Ireland) IRL	Liam Daish	20	0	20	0	0	0	0	0
12	DF	(Scotland) SCO	Paul Telfer	42	2	31+3	0	4	0	4	2
16	DF	(England) ENG	Brian Burrows	29	0	15+7	0	3	0	4	0
18	DF	(England) ENG	Marcus Hall	18	0	10+3	0	3	0	2	0
23	DF	(Ukraine) UKR	Oleksandr Yevtushok	3	0	3	0	0	0	0	0
25	DF	(Republic of Ireland) IRL	Gary Breen	9	0	8+1	0	0	0	0	0
Midfielders
6	MF	(England) ENG	Kevin Richardson	36	0	25+3	0	4	0	4	0
7	MF	(Scotland) SCO	Eoin Jess	32	2	19+8	0	4	2	1	0
10	MF	(Scotland) SCO	Gary McAllister	46	7	38	6	4	0	4	1
11	MF	(England) ENG	John Salako	29	1	23+1	1	1	0	4	0
17	MF	(Republic of Ireland) IRL	Willie Boland	1	0	0+1	0	0	0	0	0
20	MF	(Northern Ireland) NIR	Michael O'Neill	1	0	1	0	0	0	0	0
26	MF	(Scotland) SCO	Gordon Strachan	11	0	3+6	0	0+1	0	0+1	0
Forwards
8	FW	(England) ENG	Noel Whelan	43	8	34+1	6	4	2	4	0
9	FW	(England) ENG	Dion Dublin	39	14	33+1	14	1	0	3+1	0
14	FW	(Zimbabwe) ZIM	Peter Ndlovu	22	1	10+9	1	0+3	0	0	0
15	FW	(Brazil) BRA	Isaías	1	0	0+1	0	0	0	0	0
21	FW	(England) ENG	Andy Ducros	5	0	1+4	0	0	0	0	0
28	FW	(England) ENG	Darren Huckerby	29	7	21+4	5	4	2	0	0
Players who left the club during the season
24	DF	(Belgium) BEL	Régis Genaux	3	0	3	0	0	0	0	0
