= Kimberworth =

Suburb of Rotherham, South Yorkshire, England

Coordinates: 53.4228°N 1.4043°W

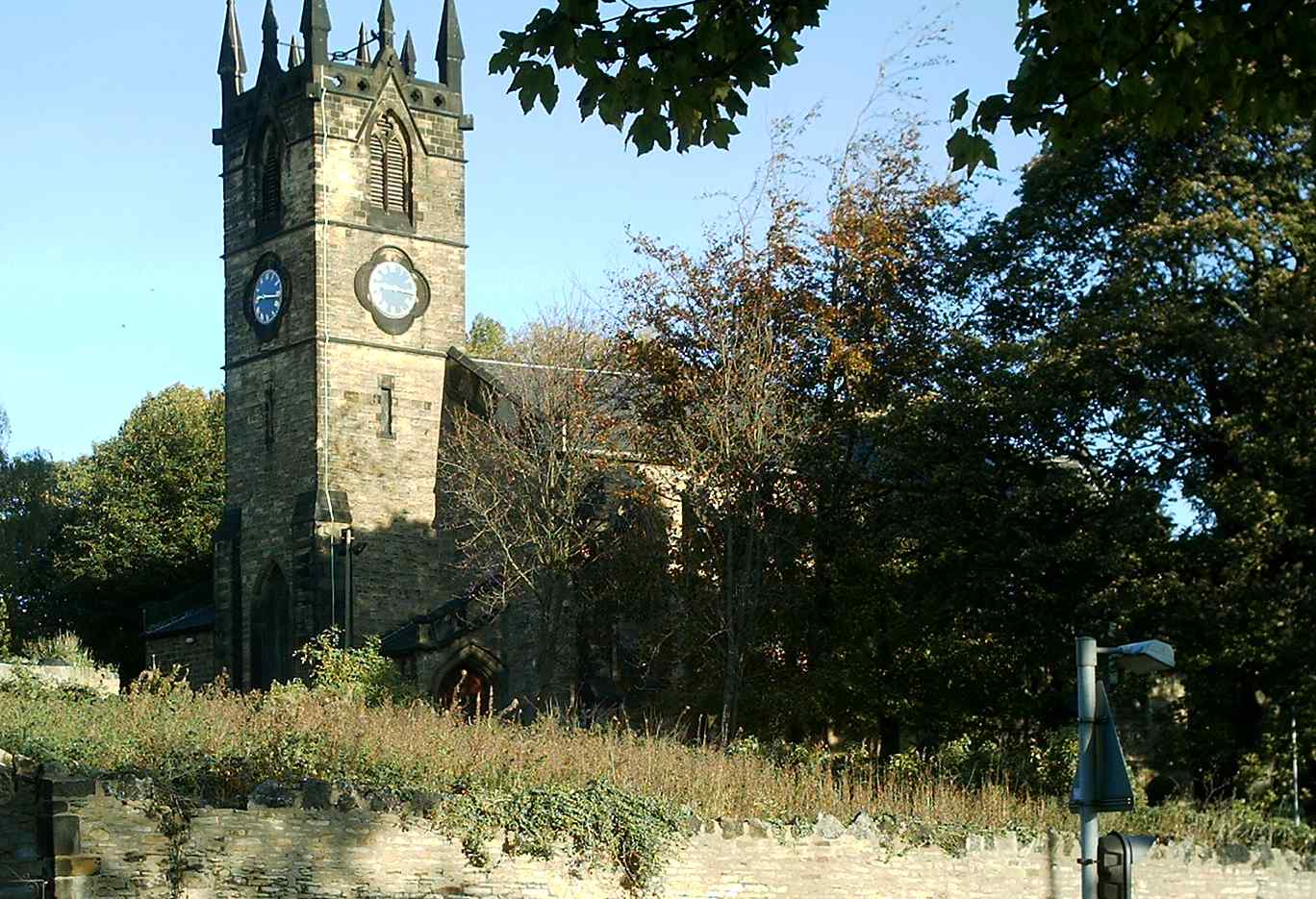
- St Thomas's Church 1843

- Location within South Yorkshire
- OS grid reference: SK401932
- Metropolitan borough: Rotherham
- Metropolitan county: South Yorkshire
- Region: Yorkshire and the Humber
- Country: England
- Sovereign state: United Kingdom
- Post town: ROTHERHAM
- Postcode district: S61
- Dialling code: 01709
- Police: South Yorkshire
- Fire: South Yorkshire
- Ambulance: Yorkshire
- UK Parliament: Rotherham

Kimberworth is a suburb of Rotherham, South Yorkshire, England. It is located in the Metropolitan Borough of Rotherham, about 2 miles (3.5 km) north-west of Rotherham town centre and 5 miles (7.6 km) north-east of Sheffield. Until 1974 it was in the West Riding of Yorkshire.

== History ==
The name Kimberworth possibly derives from the Old English Cyneburgworð meaning 'Cyneburg's enclosure'.

Kimberworth is mentioned in the 1086 Domesday Book, where it is noted as "Chiberworde". Kimberworth castle, now demolished, was located near The Drawbridge pub. The monks at nearby Kirkstead Abbey were smelting iron from around 1160, the rest of the history of this area is heavily influenced by industrial developments, especially in iron, steel and coal.

There is evidence of human activity in this area going back 5000 years. The area was settled by Brigantes, before the arrival of the Romans. The Roman expansion north was halted by the Brigantes' forts at Kimberworth and Wincobank.

The present manor house at Kimberworth was built in 1694 by the Kent family, long prominent at Kimberworth, who married with, amongst others, the Rawson family of Upperthorpe and the Creswick family that had owned land at Owlerton since the fourteenth century.

Kimberworth was formerly a township and chapelry, in 1866 Kimberworth became a separate civil parish, in 1894 the parish was abolished and merged with Rotherham and Wentworth. In 1891 the parish had a population of 19,566. It is now in the unparished area of Rotherham.

== Places of worship ==
The Kimberworth area has several churches, the most prominent being St Thomas's Anglican Church on Church Street, construction of which was started in 1842. The Salvation Army has a meeting hall on High Street, this is also used by the 1st Rotherham Cub Scout pack. Kimberworth United Reformed Church met in a building on Kimberworth Road overlooking Bradgate Park (Church closed in 2010).

== Landmarks ==
- Thundercliffe Grange – 1770s

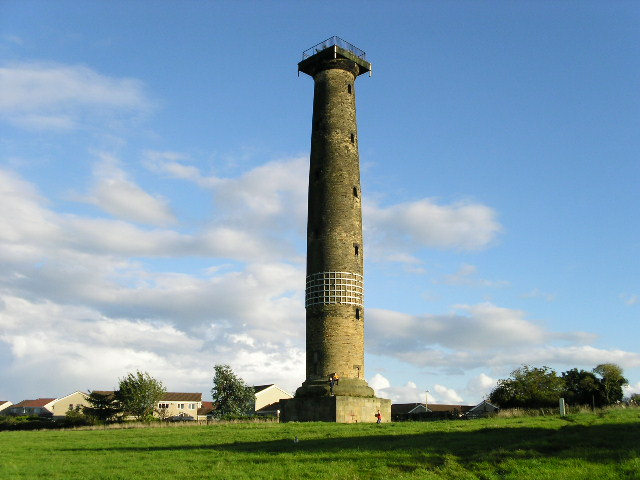
Keppel's Column built in 1778, by the Marquis of Rockingham, built to commemorate the acquittal of Admiral Keppel on charges of Treason.

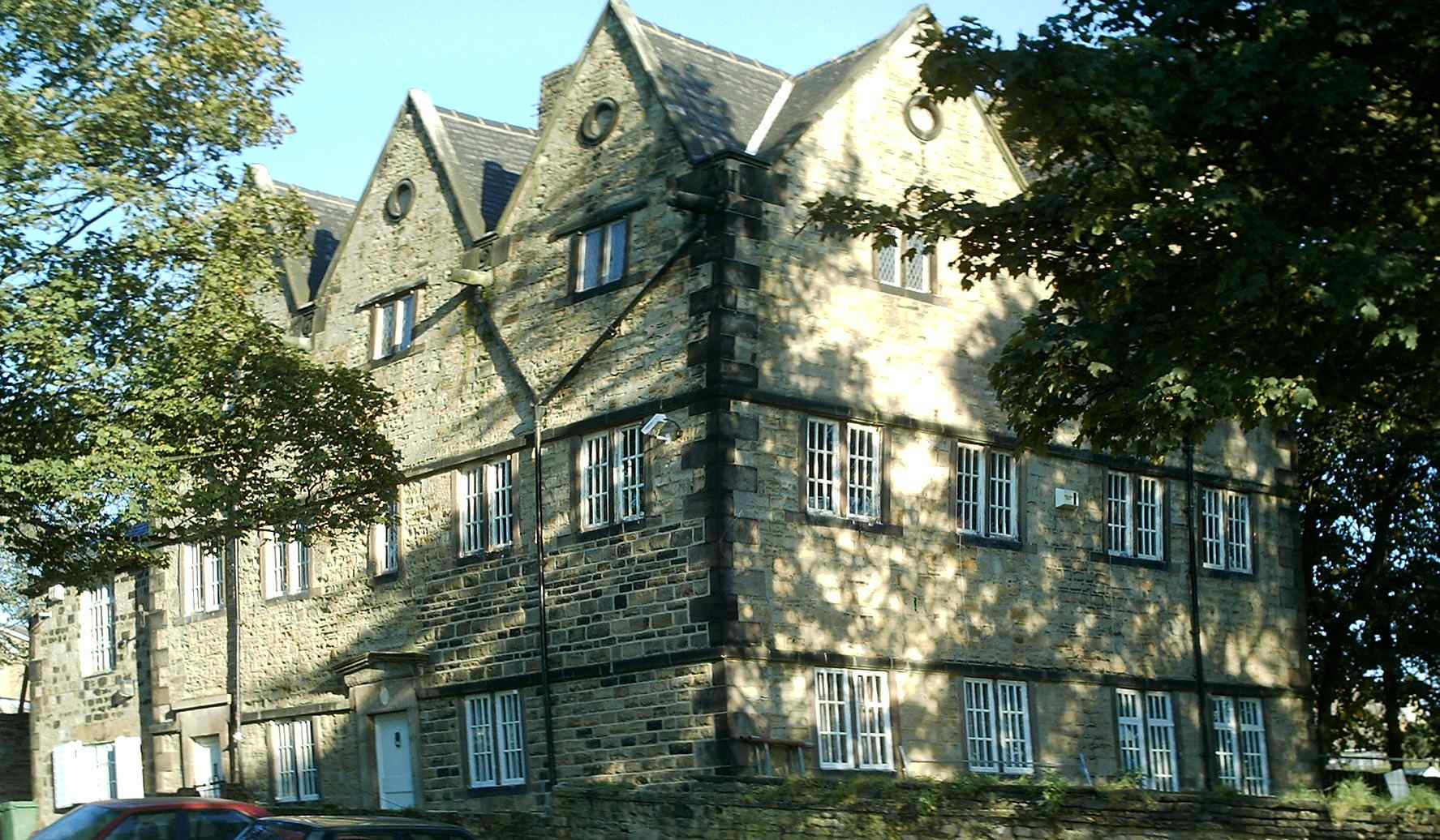
Kimberworth Manor House built in 1694

== Schools ==
Kimberworth was served by Kimberworth Comprehensive School and Old Hall Comprehensive School until 2004 when they were merged to form Winterhill School, built on the site of the latter.

== Notable people ==
- Dean Andrews, actor who appeared in Life on Mars, used to live in Kimberworth
- David Seaman, England football goalkeeper lived in nearby Ferham and attended Kimberworth Comprehensive School
- Rowland Suddaby (1912–1972), British artist and illustrator, born there

== See also ==
- Listed buildings in Rotherham (Keppel Ward)
