= 1998 Ballon d'Or =

Annual association football award event in France

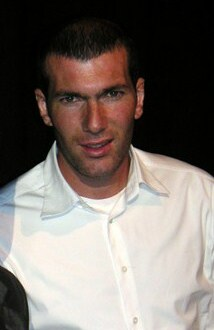
- 1998 Ballon d'Or winner, Zinedine Zidane in 2000
- Date: 22 December 1998
- Presented by: France Football

Highlights
- Won by: (France) Zinedine Zidane (1st award)
- Website: ballondor.com

The 1998 Ballon d'Or, given to the best football player in Europe as judged by a panel of sports journalists from UEFA member countries, was awarded to Zinedine Zidane on 22 December 1998. On 10 November 1998, the shortlist of 50 male players compiled by a group of experts from France Football was announced.

== Rankings ==
Rank	Player	Club(s)	Nationality	Points
1	Zinedine Zidane	(Italy) Juventus	France	244
2	Davor Šuker	(Spain) Real Madrid	Croatia	68
3	Ronaldo	(Italy) Internazionale	Brazil	66
4	Michael Owen	(England) Liverpool	England	51
5	Rivaldo	(Spain) Barcelona	Brazil	45
6	Gabriel Batistuta	(Italy) Fiorentina	Argentina	43
7	Lilian Thuram	(Italy) Parma	France	36
8	Edgar Davids	(Italy) Juventus	Netherlands	28
8	Dennis Bergkamp	(England) Arsenal	Netherlands	28
10	Marcel Desailly	(England) Chelsea	France	19
11	Frank de Boer	(Netherlands) Ajax	Netherlands	17
12	Emmanuel Petit	(England) Arsenal	France	16
13	Roberto Carlos	(Spain) Real Madrid	Brazil	13
14	Laurent Blanc	(France) Marseille	France	11
14	Fabien Barthez	(France) Monaco	France	11
16	Alessandro Del Piero	(Italy) Juventus	Italy	10
16	Predrag Mijatović	(Spain) Real Madrid	Yugoslavia	10
18	Didier Deschamps	(Italy) Juventus	France	9
18	Oliver Bierhoff	(Italy) Milan	Germany	9
20	Michael Laudrup	(Netherlands) Ajax	Denmark	6
21	Ronald de Boer	(Netherlands) Ajax	Netherlands	4
21	Raúl	(Spain) Real Madrid	Spain	4
23	Brian Laudrup	(England) Chelsea	Denmark	3
23	Clarence Seedorf	(Spain) Real Madrid	Netherlands	3
23	Marc Overmars	(England) Arsenal	Netherlands	3
26	Christian Vieri	(Italy) Lazio	Italy	2
26	Fernando Hierro	(Spain) Real Madrid	Spain	2
28	David Beckham	(England) Manchester United	England	1
28	Luis Enrique	(Spain) Barcelona	Spain	1
28	Bixente Lizarazu	(Germany) Bayern Munich	France	1
28	Nikos Machlas	(Netherlands) Vitesse	Greece	1

Additionally, nineteen players were nominated but received no votes: Tony Adams (Arsenal & England), Roberto Baggio (Bologna/Inter Milan & Italy), Zvonimir Boban (AC Milan & Croatia), Fabio Cannavaro (Parma & Italy), Denílson (São Paulo/Real Betis & Brazil), Tore André Flo (Chelsea & Norway), Adrian Ilie (Valencia & Romania), Filippo Inzaghi (Juventus & Italy), Robert Jarni (Real Betis/Real Madrid & Croatia), Hidetoshi Nakata (Bellmare Hiratsuka/Perugia & Japan), Pavel Nedvěd (Lazio & Czech Republic), Sunday Oliseh (Ajax & Nigeria), Ariel Ortega (Valencia/Sampdoria & Argentina), Gianluca Pagliuca (Inter Milan & Italy), Marcelo Salas (River Plate/Lazio & Chile), David Seaman (Arsenal & England), Andriy Shevchenko (Dynamo Kyiv & Ukraine), Juan Sebastián Verón (Sampdoria/Parma & Argentina) and Iván Zamorano (Inter Milan & Chile).
