= Masons Arms, York =

Listed pub in York, England

Masons Arms
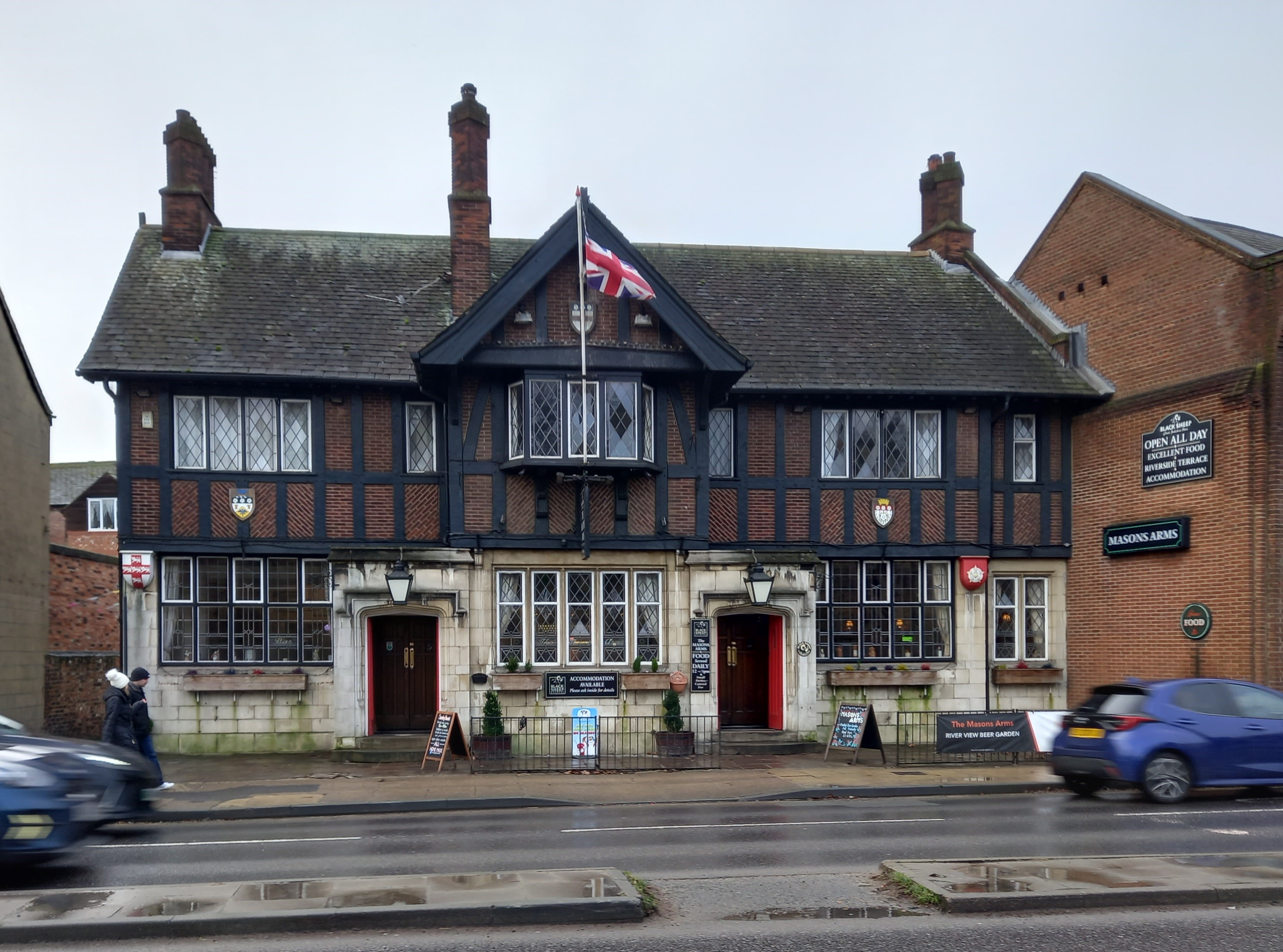
- The pub in 2024

General information
- Type: Public house
- Location: 6 Fishergate, York, England
- Coordinates: 53°57′15″N 1°04′38″W
- Year built: 1935; 91 years ago

Design and construction
- Architect: James Knight
- Designations

Listed Building – Grade II
- Official name: The Masons Arms
- Designated: 16 February 1996
- Reference no.: 1257836

Website
- masonsarmsyork.co.uk

The Masons Arms is a public house on Fishergate, immediately south of the city centre of York, England.

The Masons Arms was first recorded in 1835, when George Tilney successfully applied for a licence. It had a bar, tap room and smoke room, and also offered one bedroom for visitors.

The front of the pub was rebuilt in 1935 in a Tudor Revival style, while the original rear and the adjacent stables, which date from before 1835, were retained and are now used for accommodation. The new front was designed by James Knight, who was working for Biscomb and Ferrey. It has two storeys: the ground floor is of stone, and the first floor is of brick, with timbers inlaid to resemble timber framing. There are two front entrances, one either side of the central bay, with an identical porch. At each end of the front is a large corbel, one depicting the White Rose of York and the other five lions, taken from the city's coat of arms.

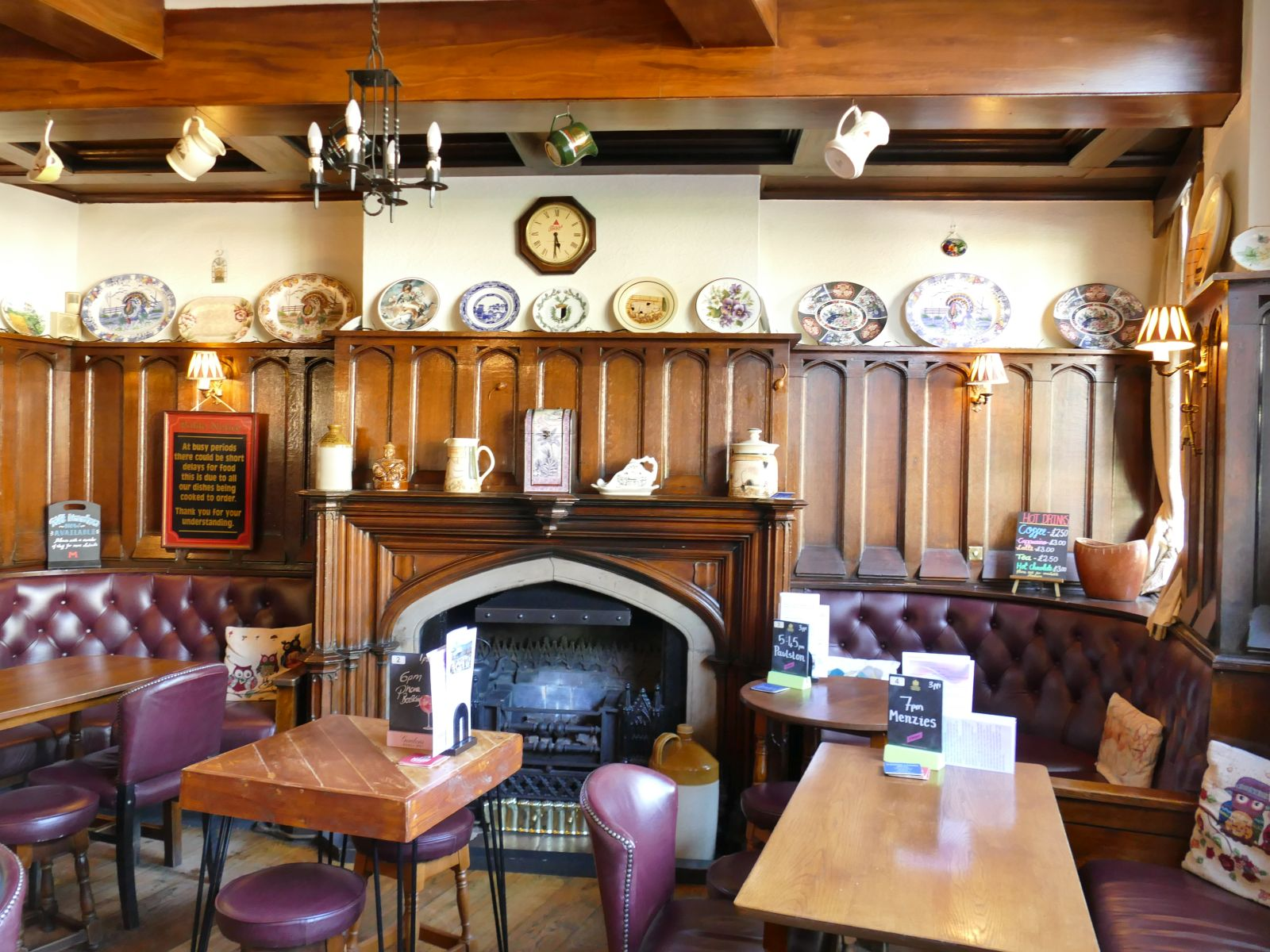
The pub interior

The ground-floor bar area has panelling and a fireplace dating from about 1830, which was taken from the gatehouse of York Castle, demolished in 1935. The lounge bar and sitting room were combined after World War II, but the public bar remains a separate space.

On 16 February 1996, the Masons Arms was designated a Grade II listed building. It was inundated during the 2015 York flood and reopened in July 2016 following restoration.

== See also ==
- Listed buildings in York (outside the city walls, southern part)
