= Kimberworth Comprehensive School =

Former community comprehensive school in Rotherham, South Yorkshire, England

Location
- Kimberworth Road; Rotherham, South Yorkshire, S61 1HE; England

Information
- Type: Community comprehensive
- Established: September 1914
- Closed: 31 August 2004
- Local authority: Rotherham
- Department for Education URN: 106948 Tables
- Ofsted: Reports
- Head teacher: Bill Bainbridge (at closure)
- Age: 11 to 16
- Enrolment: 604 (2003)
- Colours: Vermilion and grey

Kimberworth Comprehensive School was a comprehensive school in Rotherham, operating from 1914 to 2004. It merged with Old Hall Comprehensive School to form Winterhill School.

== History ==
The institution opened in September 1914 as a school for 11–14 year olds. The buildings were designed by the Rotherham architect James Knight. It later became a comprehensive school, with the upper age extended to 16.

The school closed at the end of the 2003–2004 academic year. The students and many staff transferred to the neighbouring Old Hall Comprehensive School, which was renamed Winterhill School as a result of the amalgamation. Both Winterhill and the nearby Wingfield Business and Enterprise College were rebuilt with extra capacity to accommodate the former Kimberworth students. Since its closure, the building was used as a temporary base for the "Old Hall City Learning Centre". After their departure, the building became derelict and remained empty for a number of years. In 2011, the building was renovated and was opened as an NHS centre "Kimberworth Place Psalters Centre".

== Ofsted inspections ==
Between the commencement of Ofsted inspections in September 1993 and the school's closure in August 2004, it underwent two full inspections:

| Date of inspection | Outcome | Reference |
|---|---|---|
| 30 September – ?? October 1996 | ??? | |
| 26–29 November 2001 | Unsatisfactory (serious weaknesses) | Report |

== Notable alumni ==
- David Seaman, England footballer
