= 1986–87 Queens Park Rangers F.C. season =

English football club season

Queens Park Rangers
1986–87 season
- Chairman: Jim Gregory (Until Feb 1987), David Bulstrode
- Manager: Jim Smith
- Stadium: Loftus Road
- First Division: 16th
- FA Cup: Fifth round
- League Cup: Third round
- Top goalscorer: League: Gary Bannister (15); All: Bannister (15)
- Highest home attendance: 24,045 (v Liverpool, 8 November 1986)
- Lowest home attendance: 9,834 (v Norwich City, 28 March 1987)
- Average home league attendance: 14,016
- Biggest win: 5-2 Vs Leicester City (10 January 1987)
- Biggest defeat: 1-7 Vs Sheffield Wednesday (2 May 1987)
Home colours	Away colours

During the 1986–87 English football season, Queens Park Rangers competed in the First Division for the fourth season after their promotion in 1983.

== Season summary ==
Jim Smith Steered QPR to 16th place in the First Division. The R's had been sitting second in the league in september.but fell away as the season progressed. Overall the season was mostly a mid table affair but only one win in the last twelve games placed QPR precariously close to the relegation places.

Chairman Jim Gregory sold QPR to Marler Estates, a property company that already owned Fulham's Craven Cottage and Chelsea's Stamford Bridge, for a sum of £5,865,510, with David Bulstrode becoming the new Chairman

The Manchester City Game on February was delayed by 19 minutes due to a sit down protest regarding the proposed merger with Fulham.

In March plans for a merger between Fulham were scrapped after the Football League vetoed the proposal with QPR Fans Staging protests to stop the merger.

A year after reaching the Milk Cup final they could only reach the third round of the League Cup and reached the fifth round of the FA Cup.

David Seaman was signed from relegated Birmingham in August for £225,000.

A winner of 14 trophies in his career at Liverpool, England International Sammy Lee found there was no longer a place for him at Liverpool and was transferred in August, joining Queens Park Rangers for £175,000

Future QPR Legend, Les Ferdinand was signed from Hayes for £50,000 in March. making his QPR debut on 20 April.

== Kit ==
Adidas remained as QPR's kit manufacturers. With Blue Star Garages (owned by Jim Gregory (football chairman) as kit sponsors.

== League table ==
Pos	Team	Pld	W	D	L	GF	GA	GD	Pts
14	Chelsea	42	13	13	16	53	64	−11	52
15	West Ham United	42	14	10	18	52	67	−15	52
16	Queens Park Rangers	42	13	11	18	48	64	−16	50
17	Newcastle United	42	12	11	19	47	65	−18	47
18	Oxford United	42	11	13	18	44	69	−25	46

Source: World Football
Rules for classification: 1) Points; 2) Goal difference; 3) Goals scored

== Results ==
Queens Park Rangers' score comes first

Win Draw Loss

=== Football League First Division ===
Date	Opponents	Venue	Result F–A	Scorers	Attendance	Position
23 August 1986	Southampton	A	1–5	14,711	Allen	22
26 August 1986	Watford	H	3–2	14,021	Bannister, Fereday, Allen	12
30 August 1986	Aston Villa	H	1–0	13,003	Bannister 61'	5
29 August 1986	Newcastle United	A	2–0	23.080	Bannister, Byrne	2
6 September 1986	Everton	A	0–0	30,173		4
13 September 1986	West Ham United	H	2–3	19,257	Byrne, James	7
20 September 1986	Manchester City	A	0-0	17,774		10
27 September 1986	Leicester City	H	0–1	10.021		11
4 October 1986	Norwich City	A	0–1	15.894		15
11 October 1986	Wimbledon	H	2–1	14,112	McDonald, Bannister	12
18 October 1986	Nottingham Forest	A	0–4	17,199		13
25 October 1986	Tottenham Hotspur	H	2–0	21,579	Byrne, Allen	11
1 November 1986	Luton Town	A	0–1	9,085		13
8 November 1986	Liverpool	H	1–3	24,045	Bannister 27'	15
15 November 1986	Oxford United	H	1–1	12,967	Byrne	14
22 November 1986	Manchester United	A	0–1	42,235		15
29 November 1986	Sheffield Wednesday	H	2–2	10,241	Bannister, McDonald	15
6 December 1986	Arsenal	A	1–3	34,049	Bannister	15
13 December 1986	Charlton Athletic	H	0–0	10,299		16
20 December 1986	West Ham United	A	1–1	7,229	Fenwick	16
26 December 1986	Coventry City	H	3–1	10,053	Bannister, Byrne, Allen	15
27 December 1986	Oxford United	A	1–0	11,082	James	13
1 January 1987	Chelsea	A	1–3	20,982	Byrne 57'	15
3 January 1987	Everton	H	0–1	19,287		15
17 January 1987	Watford	A	PP			
24 January 1987	Southampton	H	2–1	10,200	Bannister, Byrne	14
7 February 1987	Aston Villa	A	1–0	11,512	Keown o.g. 62'	14
14 February 1987	Newcastle United	H	2–1	10,731	Byrne, Fillery	13
21 February 1987	Leicester City	A	PP			
28 February 1987	Manchester City	H	1–0	12,739	Allen 83'	11
7 March 1987	Tottenham Hotspur	A	0–1	21,071		12
14 March 1987	Nottingham Forest	H	3–1	11,896	Bannister, Fereday, McDonald	11
18 March 1987	Liverpool	A	1–2	29,988	Fillery 17'	11
21 March 1987	Wimbledon	A	1–1	6,938	Rosenior	12
25 March 1987	Leicester City	A	1–4	7,384	Rosenior	12
28 March 1987	Norwich City	H	1–1	9,834	Rosenior	13
6 April 1987	Watford	A	3–0	13,039	Bannister 3	12
11 April 1987	Luton Town	H	2–2	11,164	Byrne 2	10
18 April 1987	Chelsea	H	1–1	18,081	Byrne 5'	11
20 April 1987	Coventry City	A	1–4	20,925	Bannister	12
25 April 1987	Manchester United	H	1–1	17,414	Byrne 66'	12
2 May 1987	Sheffield Wednesday	A	1–7	16,501	Peacock	13
4 May 1987	Arsenal	H	1–4	13,287	McDonald	15
9 May 1987	Charlton Athletic	A	1–2	7,769	Rosenior	16

=== FA Cup ===
Round	Date	Opponent	Venue	Result F–A	Attendance	Scorers
R3	10 January 1987	Leicester City (First Division)	H	5–2	9,684	Fenwick (2), Byrne, James, Lee
R4	31 January 1987	Luton Town (First Division)	A	1–1	12,707	Fenwick
R4 Replay	4 February 1987	Luton Town (First Division)	H	2–1	15,848	Fenwick, Byrne
R5	21 February 1987	Leeds United (Second Division)	A	1–2	31,324	O.G.

=== Littlewoods Challenge Cup ===
Round	Date	Opponent	Venue	Result F–A	Attendance	Scorers
R2 1st leg	23 September 1986	Blackburn Rovers (Second Division)	H	2–1	6,316	Byrne, Brazil
R2 2nd leg	7 October 1986	Blackburn Rovers (Second Division)	A	2–2 (won 4–3 on agg)	5,100	Bannister, Walker
R3	28 October 1986	Charlton Athletic (First Division)	A	0–1	6,926	

=== Friendlies ===
Date	Country	Opponents	Venue	Result F–A	Scorers	Attendance
27-Jul-1986	Sweden	Alingsas IF	A			
29-Jul-1986	Sweden	Falkenbergs FF	A			
31-Jul-1986	Sweden	Ósterlenlaget	A			
2-Aug-1986	Sweden	Höganäs BK	A	6-0	Robinson, Bannister, Hebberd, Waddock, Brazil, Sage.	1,161
4-Aug-1986	Sweden	Ljungby	A			
8-Aug-86		Enfield	A			
9-Aug-86		Gillingham	A			
13-Aug-86		Brentford	A			
16-Aug-86		Portsmouth	A			
18-Aug-86	Geoff Scott Benefit	Cambridge United	A			
20-Oct-86		Tottenham Hotspur	H			
25-Nov-86	Wales	Merthyr Tydfil AFC	A			
21-Jan-87		Swindon Town	H			
9-Feb-87		Dawlish Town	A			
15-May-87	Stan Bowles Benefit Match	Brentford	A			

== Squad ==
Position	Nationality	Name	League Appearances	League Goals	Cup Appearances	Littlewoods Challenge Cup Goals	F.A.Cup Goals	Total Appearances	Total Goals
GK	ENG	David Seaman	41		7			48	
GK	ENG	Paul Barron	1					1	
DF	ENG	Terry Fenwick	21	1	4		4	26	5
DF	NIR	Alan Mcdonald	39	4	5			44	4
DF	ENG	Warren Neill	29		3			32	
DF	ENG	Ian Dawes	23		3			26	
DF	ENG	Justin Channing	2					2	
MF	ENG	Gary Chivers	23		4			27	
MF	ENG	David Kerslake	2					3	
MF	ENG	Gavin Peacock	7	1				13	1
MF	ENG	Martin Allen	32	5	6			38	5
MF	ENG	Gavin Maguire	13		1			16	
MF	IRE	Gary Waddock	4		1			5	
MF	ENG	Mike Fillery	17	2	3			21	2
FW	ENG	Gary Bannister	34	15	7	1		41	16
FW	WAL	Robbie James	37	2	7		1	46	3
FW	ENG	Les Ferdinand						2	
FW	ENG	Wayne Fereday	36	2	7			44	2
FW	ENG	Leroy Rosenior	15	4	1			26	4
FW	SCO	Alan Brazil	1		1	1		6	1
FW	ENG	Sammy Lee	29		4		1	35	1
FW	IRE	John Byrne	37	11	6	1	2	45	14
FW	ENG	Clive Walker	11		6	1		23	1
FW	IRE	Michael Robinson	8		1			13	

== Transfers Out ==
Name	from	Date	Fee	Date	Club	Fee
Steve Wicks	Crystal Palace	Mar 25,1982	£325,000	July 1986	Chelsea	£500,000
Kurt Bakholt	Vejle BK	Jan 22,1986		July 1986	Vejle BK	Free
Steve Burke	Nottingham Forest	Sep 1,1979	£125,000	August 1986	Doncaster Rovers	Free
Paul Barron	West Bromwich Albion	August 1985	£40,000	December 1986	Reading	loan
Peter Hucker	Queens Park Rangers Juniors	July 1977		February 1987	Oxford United	£100,000
Michael Robinson	Liverpool	Dec 26,1984	£100,000	January 1987	Osasuna	£150,000
Alan Brazil	Coventry	June 3, 1986	£200,000	Jan 87	Retired (Injury)	
Jimmy Carter	Crystal P	Dec 10,1985	Free	Mar 87	Millwall	£15,000
Paul Davis		Dec1985		May 87	Aldershot	Free
Leroy Rosenior	Fulham	Aug 16,1985	£100,000	June 87	Fulham	£100,000

== Transfers In ==
Name	from	Date	Fee
David Seaman	Birmingham City	Aug 6,1986	£225,000
Justin Channing	Queens Park Rangers Juniors	Aug 20,1986	
Sammy Lee	Liverpool	Aug 25,1986	£175,000
Les Ferdinand	Hayes	Mar 12,1987	£50,000
Mark Dennis	Southampton	May 1, 1987	£50,000
Paul Parker	Fulham	June 18, 1987	£250,000
Dean Coney	Fulham	June 18, 1987	£200,000
