= Winterhill School =

Location
- High Street; Kimberworth; Rotherham, South Yorkshire, S61 2BD; England; 53.43446°N 1.39796°W

Information
- Type: Academy
- Motto: everyone succeeds
- Established: 2004
- Local authority: Rotherham
- Department for Education URN: 141853 Tables
- Ofsted: Reports
- Chair: Anne Hinds
- Headteacher: Andrew Reeder
- Gender: Mixed
- Age: 11 to 16
- Enrolment: 1,219
- Capacity: 1,577
- Publication: The Wave
- Website: http://www.winterhill.org.uk/

Winterhill School is a mixed secondary school located in Kimberworth, Rotherham, South Yorkshire, England. The school was formed in 2004 by the merger of Old Hall Comprehensive School and the nearby Kimberworth Comprehensive School.

It lies on the former site of Old Hall School, at the corner of High Street and Little Common Lane in Kimberworth. The name of the new school was chosen by pupils and is derived from the "Winter Hills", a range of hills that lie directly behind the school. These "Winter Hills" were the spoil heaps from the coal-mining operations in the area and were effectively removed by landscaping in 1976. The school's motto is "everyone succeeds". In September 2017, the City Learning Centre @ Winterhill has been combined with the school and now contains the visitor entrance. It has been renamed "The Network."

The school employs around 150 staff and has an enrolment of 1,200 pupils (despite having the capacity for almost 1,600) and accommodates children from Years 7–11. There is no sixth form, but many leaving pupils go on to complete further education in other institutions, such as Thomas Rotherham College and Rotherham College of Arts and Technology.

Winterhill School has also become an Accredited Test Centre for the European Computer Driving Licence.

Previously a community school and then a foundation school, both administered by Rotherham Metropolitan Borough Council, Winterhill School converted to academy status on 1 February 2016. However, the school continues to coordinate with Rotherham Metropolitan Borough Council for admissions. The school is run by the Inspire Learning trust.

== Ofsted inspections ==
Since being founded in 2004, the school has undergone five full Ofsted inspections:

| Date of inspection | Outcome | Reference |
|---|---|---|
| 5–6 July 2006 | Satisfactory | Report |
| 14–15 January 2009 | Inadequate (notice to improve) | Report |
| 10–11 March 2010 | Satisfactory | Report |
| 29–30 January 2013 | Good | Report |
| 27 February 2018 | Good | Report |
| 7–8 March 2023 | Good | Report |

== Headteachers ==
- Mr Bill Bainbridge, September 2004–August 2005 (previously the last headteacher of Old Hall School)
- Mr Roger Burman, September 2005–March 2016
- Mrs Joanne Cater-Whitham and Mr Stephen Rhodes, April 2016–June 2016 (acting co-headteachers)
- Mr Stephen Rhodes, June 2016–January 2025 (died in post)
- Dr Andrew Reeder, January 2025–present (initially acting headteacher)
