= Old Hall Comprehensive School =

Location
- High Street; Kimberworth; Rotherham, South Yorkshire, S61 2BD; England
- Coordinates: 53.43447°N 1.39796°W

Information
- Type: Community comprehensive school
- Motto: Other People Matter
- Established: 1950s
- Closed: August 2004
- Local authority: Rotherham
- Specialist: Technology
- Department for Education URN: 106950 Tables
- Ofsted: Reports
- Head teacher: Bill Bainbridge (at closure)
- Age: 11 to 16
- Enrolment: 1,200 approx. (at closure)
- Capacity: 1,128 (at closure)

Old Hall Comprehensive School was a comprehensive school located in Kimberworth, Rotherham, South Yorkshire, England. It merged with Kimberworth Comprehensive School to form Winterhill School in September 2004.

== History ==
The school opened in the 1950s and moved into its own buildings in January 1959. It was originally a secondary modern school, but became a comprehensive school in 1966. The school's buildings were extended in 1973. It gained Technology College status in 1998.

Old Hall School ceased to exist under its old name as of September 2004 when the neighbouring Kimberworth Comprehensive School closed and all pupils transferred to Old Hall, now renamed Winterhill School. Legally, Winterhill is the same entity as Old Hall, though Winterhill is generally considered to be a completely new school.

== The school site ==
The school structure consisted of mostly timber frame buildings, constructed in the 1970s and linked by covered walkways intended to provide some protection from the elements for pupils making their way between classes. These were augmented in the 1990s by several temporary classrooms, needed to accommodate the rising numbers of pupils, before the school was eventually demolished to make way for the new Winterhill School building. Before the City Learning Centre was opened the school had two assembly halls, known as the East Hall and the West Hall.

== Academic performance ==
At the time of its closure, the school had around 130 staff members and around 1,200 pupils from between the ages of 11 and 16. The school had no sixth form, but many leaving pupils went on to study A-levels and other further qualifications at nearby colleges, principally Thomas Rotherham College and Rotherham College of Arts and Technology. At its best, examination results in GCSEs and GNVQs at Old Hall were among the best in the area: in 2003 (the year before the school finally closed), 61% of pupils attained 5 or more A*-C grades or equivalent, compared to a national average of 53% and a local average of 45%.

== Long March ==
A tradition in the school was the holding of a “Long March” each year, in which all pupils in the school took part in a sponsored walk to raise money for local and national charities. Originally taking place around Kimberworth and Scholes.Derwent and Ladybower Reservoirs in the Peak District, it was later moved to Rother Valley Country Park due to safety concerns. The tradition has been continued by pupils at Winterhill School, to raise money for an astro-turf pitch.

== Ofsted inspections ==
Between the commencement of Ofsted inspections in September 1993 and the school's closure in August 2004, it underwent two full inspections:

Date of inspection	Outcome	Reference
31 October – 4 November 1994	???	
28 September – 2 October 1998	Very good	Report
