= James Knight (architect) =

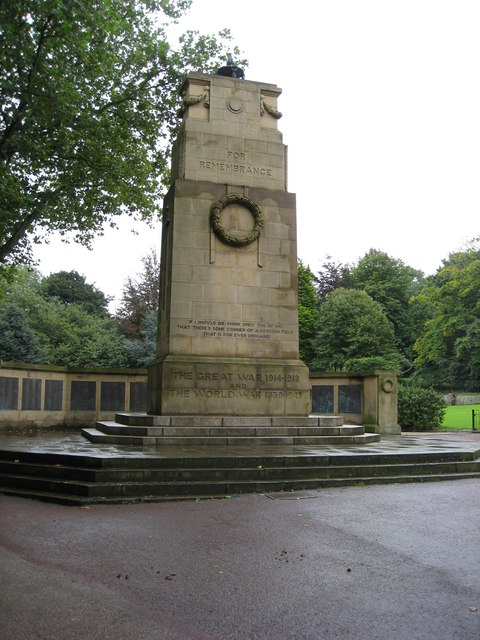
War Memorial, Clifton Park, Rotherham ca.1921

Lieutenant Colonel James Edward Knight TD JP, (1867 – 9 June 1930) was an English Architect based in Rotherham.

He was the son of Henry John Knight (1837–1899) and Alice Ann Barton (1839–1924).

He served in the 2nd Volunteer Battalion of the York and Lancaster Regiment, and was promoted to second lieutenant on 25 May 1898 and to major on 1 April 1908. He was awarded the Territorial Decoration in 1918. He retired from military service in 1921 and was promoted to lieutenant colonel.

After his death in 1930, the company continued trading as James E Knight and Co with John Lawton and Arnold Ewart Hollely until 1943, when the partnership was dissolved.

== Works ==
- New chancel screen and choir stalls, Rotherham Minster 1897
- East Dene Primary School, Doncaster Road School, 1901
- Park Street School, Rotherham 1901
- Nightingale Ward, Rotherham Hospital 1903
- Kimberworth Wesleyan School Chapel 1904
- Rotherham Children’s Home, Filey 1904
- East Dene Primary School, Doncaster Road, Rotherham 1907 (additions)
- Unionist Club, Doncaster Gate, Rotherham 1908
- St Peter’s Church, Whinney Hill, Rotherham 1909
- St Mary’s Church, Catcliffe, Rotherham 1910
- Mexborough and District Secondary School, College Road, Mexborough 1910
- Tivoli Cinema, Masbrough Street, Rotherham 1913
- Thurcroft Colliery Housing 1913 onwards
- Kimberworth School, 1914
- New offices, Park Gate Iron and Steel Company, Broad Street, Rotherham 1914
- Rotherham War Memorial, Clifton Park 1921
- War Memorial to the York and Lancaster Regiment, South choir aisle, South wall, York Minster 1927
- Davy’s Corner, 16–20 College Street, Rotherham 1926
- White Hart public house, Upper Millgate and Bridgegate, Rotherham 1929 (now Barclay’s Bank)
- The Cross Keys, Rotherham 1931 (by James E Knight and Co)
- The Bridge Inn, Rotherham (restoration) 1932 (by James E Knight and Co)
- The Stag Inn, Rotherham 1934 (by James E Knight and Co)
- Masons Arms public house, York 1935 (by James E Knight and Co)
