= Oleksandr Yevtushok =

Ukrainian footballer (born 1970)

Personal information
- Full name: Oleksandr Vasilovych Yevtushok
- Date of birth: 11 January 1970 (age 56)
- Place of birth: Dzhankoy, Ukrainian SSR, Soviet Union
- Height: 1.88 m (6 ft 2 in)
- Positions: Central defender; midfielder

Senior career*
Years	Team	Apps	(Gls)
1990–1991	SC Tavriya Simferopol	33	(0)
1992–1993	Naftovyk Okhtyrka	49	(2)
1993	→ Yavir Krasnopillya (loan)	2	(0)
1993–1995	Karpaty Lviv	64	(4)
1995–1996	Dnipro Dnipropetrovsk	29	(2)
1996	→ Karpaty Lviv (loan)	9	(0)
1997	Coventry City	3	(0)
1997	FC Zirka Smila	2	(1)
1998–1999	Karpaty Lviv	44	(5)
1998–1999	Karpaty-2 Lviv	3	(0)
2000	CSKA Kyiv	23	(2)
2000	CSKA-2 Kyiv	2	(0)

International career
1994–1998	Ukraine	8	(0)
- * Club domestic league appearances and goals

Oleksandr Yevtushok (Ukrainian: Олекса́ндр Васи́льович Євтушо́к, born 11 January 1970), sometimes called Alex Evtushok in the British media, is a Ukrainian former professional footballer who played as a central defender.

== Club career ==
Yevtushok was born in Dzhankoy, Ukrainian SSR. He started his career in 1990 at SC Tavriya Simferopol, where he played the last two seasons of the Soviet First League. In 1992, he joined Naftovyk Okhtyrka, a team which was previously in the fourth tier of the Soviet League, for the inaugural Ukrainian Premier League season. The club was relegated and then finished in third place in the 1992–93 Ukrainian First League. He also played in the 1992–93 Ukrainian Second League for Yavir Krasnopillya, which also finished the third place.

He joined Karpaty Lviv in 1993 and scored the winning goal in the 1993–94 European Cup Winners' Cup match against Shelbourne, which was the club's first European win. He moved to Dnipro Dnipropetrovsk in 1995, but later return to Karpaty Lviv on loan in 1996.

Yevtushok was signed by Premier League club Coventry City in 1997, becoming the first Ukrainian footballer to play in the competition (besides Andrei Kanchelskis, who decided to play for Russia). In his debut, against Manchester United, he was replaced just after 30 minutes in a 3–1 loss. He had two other appearances and was released after Coventry City escaped relegation on the final matchday.

He later returned to Ukraine and spent the rest of 1997 for FC Zirka Smila in the Ukrainian Football Amateur League, returning to Karpaty Lviv in the following year. He last played for FC CSKA Kyiv in 2000.

== International career ==
Yevtushok earned eight caps for the Ukraine national team.
