= Calita =

Portuguese footballer (born 1972)

Personal information
- Full name: Carlos Alberto Souto Maior Silva Batista
- Date of birth: 20 December 1972 (age 53)
- Place of birth: Lisbon, Portugal (Note: Per ForaDeJogo. Certain other sources 1, 2 suggest he was born in Angola.)
- Height: 1.75 m (5 ft 9 in)
- Position: Midfielder

Youth career
- 1984–1990: Imortal

Senior career*
Years	Team	Apps	(Gls)
1990–1994	Imortal		
1994–1995	Farense	7	(1)
1995–1996	Coventry City	0	(0)
1996	→ Boavista (loan)	4	(0)
1997	Nacional	9	(1)
1997–1998	Imortal	26	(4)
1998–2000	Louletano	44	(4)
2000	Lusitano		
2000–2001	Quarteirense		
2001–2002	Messinense		
2003	Lusitano	17	(1)
2004–2006	Serrano		
2006–2008	São Marcos		
2008–2009	Imortal		
2009–2011	Serrano		
2011–2012	São Marcos		
2013–2014	Guia		
2015–2016	Guia		
2016–2017	Santaclarense		
- * Club domestic league appearances and goals as of 18 May 2003

Carlos Alberto Souto Maior Silva Batista (born 20 December 1972), commonly known as Calita, is a Portuguese former footballer who played as a midfielder.

== Football career ==
Calita started his career with Imortal DC. He had only played in seven Primeira Liga games for S.C. Farense when he was purchased by Coventry City on 5 July 1995, after failing a trial at Blackburn Rovers, for a fee reported as ranging from £125,000–350,000. He never broke into the first team with the Premier League club and finished 1995–96 back in his country with Boavista, also in the top division.

During his short spell in England, he was known as Carlita. He was the first Portuguese footballer to be signed by an English Premier League club. But he later revealed that he joined Coventry City after having been made false salary promises, and he left the club because his actual income was barely enough to live on.

From 1997 until his retirement two decades later, Calita never played higher than the third level of Portuguese football and predominantly competed in the second regional division, with most of the teams hailing from the Algarve region.
