= David Busst =

English association football player and manager (born 1967)

Personal information
- Full name: David John Busst
- Date of birth: 30 June 1967 (age 59)
- Place of birth: Birmingham, England
- Height: 6 ft 1 in (1.85 m)
- Position: Centre-back

Team information
- Current team: Coventry City (football community manager)

Senior career*
Years	Team	Apps	(Gls)
1991–1992	Moor Green		
1992–1996	Coventry City	50	(4)
2008–2009	Highgate United		
Total		50	(4)

Managerial career
- 2000–2003: Solihull Borough
- 2003–2006: Evesham United
- * Club domestic league appearances and goals

David John Busst (/ˈbjuːst/ BYOOST; born 30 June 1967) is an English football manager and former professional player who played as a centre-back from 1992 until 1996.

Having started his career with non-League Moor Green, he moved to Premier League side Coventry City in 1992. Having made over 50 appearances for the Sky Blues, he suffered a broken leg during a match with Manchester United in 1996 which ended his career. His injury is often considered the worst in the history of the Premier League.

He moved into management following his retirement with Solihull Borough in 2001, and later took charge of Evesham United. He came out of retirement in 2008 as defensive cover for Highgate United.

== Early life ==
Busst was born in Birmingham, West Midlands.

== Club career ==
Busst played as a defender, and started his career at non-League side Moor Green in Birmingham, before moving to Premier League side Coventry City in 1992. He made his professional debut in an FA Cup match against Norwich City on 13 January 1993, and his Premier League debut three days later against the same side. He made ten league appearances in his first professional season, and went on to make 50 league appearances in total for the club, scoring four goals.

=== Injury ===
Busst's professional playing career came to an end on 8 April 1996, while playing for Coventry against Manchester United. Two minutes into the match, having ventured forward after his team won a corner, he collided with United players Denis Irwin and Brian McClair, resulting in extensive compound fractures to both the tibia and fibula of his right leg. The match was delayed for nine minutes while Busst was treated and removed from the field on a stretcher, and blood was cleaned off the grass with water and sand. Manchester United's goalkeeper Peter Schmeichel vomited on the pitch upon seeing the injury. Schmeichel later said that the injury preyed on his mind until two years later, when he and Busst met and discussed the accident. The injury is often described as one of the worst in the history of football.

Busst's injuries were so severe that at one point he ran the risk of having his leg amputated. While in hospital, he contracted methicillin-resistant Staphylococcus aureus (MRSA), which caused further damage to the tissue and muscle in the injured part of his leg. Despite having 22 operations, Busst remained a member of the official Coventry squad for a further seven months, but never played professionally again, and he retired from the game on 6 November 1996 on medical advice, as his doctors had warned him that he would never regain sufficient fitness to play professional football. It was not the break itself that ended his career, but the following infections. Just weeks before his retirement, Busst had been hoping to return to training the following spring and be ready for first team action by the start of the 1997–98 season.

His testimonial match, played on 16 May 1997 against Manchester United, was a sell-out. England internationals Paul Gascoigne and Les Ferdinand guested for Coventry in the game, which was also the last game that United captain Eric Cantona played before he announced his retirement as a player two days later.

== Post-retirement career ==
Since his retirement, Busst has worked for Coventry's backroom staff, working for their Football in the Community programme, of which he became director.

Busst also trained as a coach, earning UEFA coaching badges. He went on to manage the non-League sides Solihull Borough (from 2000 until 2003) and Evesham United (from 2003 to 2006.) He briefly acted as defensive cover in 2008 for Midland Combination Premier Division side Highgate United, where his brother Paul was the club's assistant manager.

As of 2024, Busst also plays for local side Leamington Veterans, alongside his fellow former Coventry player Dele Adebola.
