= Les Ferdinand =

English footballer and manager (born 1966)

Les Ferdinand MBE
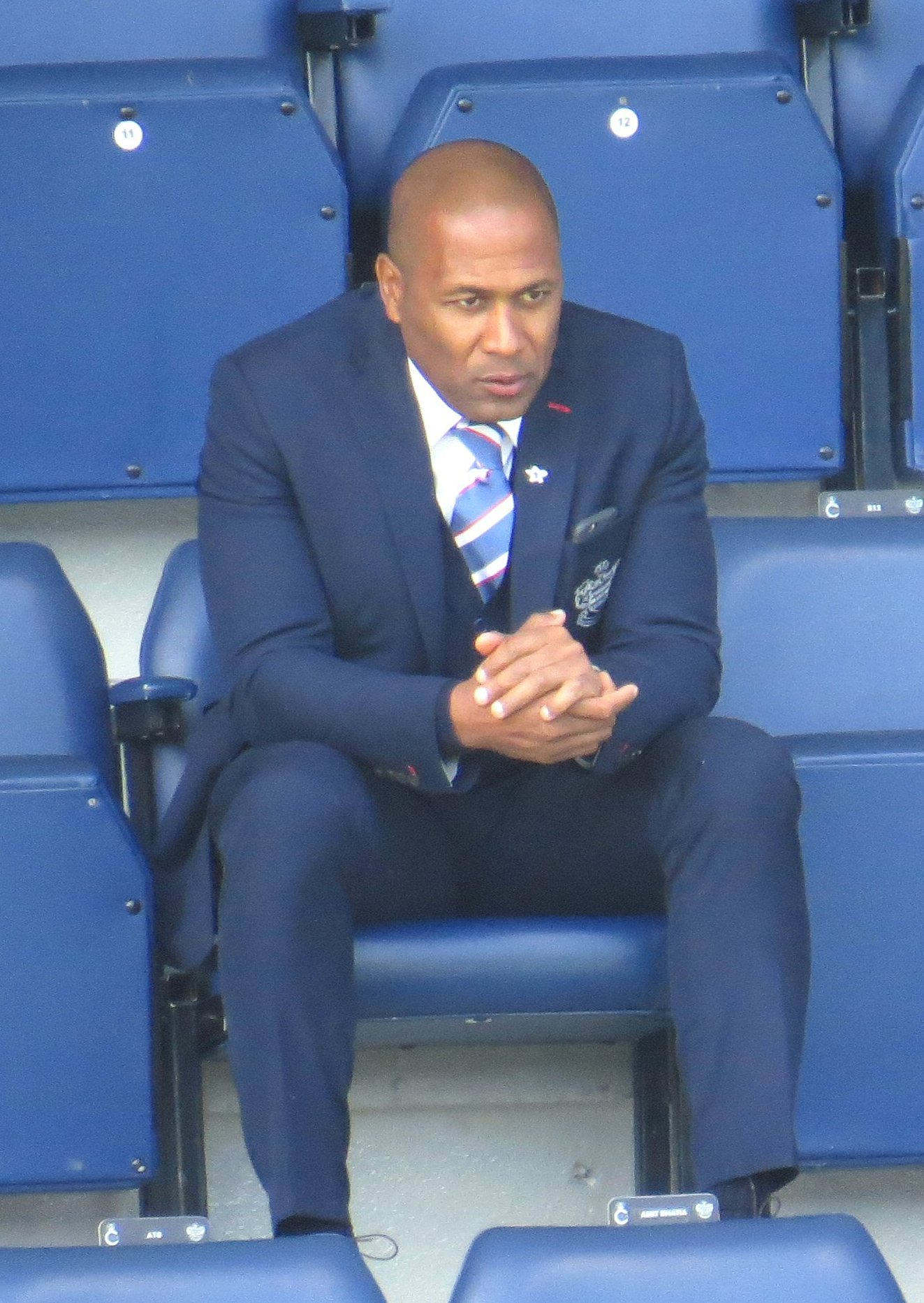
- Ferdinand watching a Queens Park Rangers match in 2015

Personal information
- Full name: Leslie Ferdinand
- Date of birth: 8 December 1966 (age 59)
- Place of birth: Acton, Greater London, England
- Height: 5 ft 11 in (1.80 m)
- Position: Striker

Youth career
- Viking Sports
- Southall

Senior career*
Years	Team	Apps	(Gls)
1984–1986	Southall		
1986–1987	Hayes	33	(19)
1987–1995	Queens Park Rangers	163	(80)
1988	→ Brentford (loan)	3	(0)
1988–1989	→ Beşiktaş (loan)	24	(14)
1995–1997	Newcastle United	68	(41)
1997–2003	Tottenham Hotspur	118	(33)
2003	West Ham United	14	(2)
2003–2004	Leicester City	29	(12)
2004–2005	Bolton Wanderers	12	(1)
2005	Reading	12	(1)
2005–2006	Watford	0	(0)
Total		443	(184)

International career
1998	England B	1	(1)
1993–1998	England	17	(5)
- * Club domestic league appearances and goals

Leslie Ferdinand (born 8 December 1966) is an English football coach, former professional footballer and television pundit.

A striker, his playing career included notable spells in the Premier League with Queens Park Rangers, Newcastle United, Tottenham Hotspur, West Ham United, Leicester City and Bolton Wanderers. He also played in Turkey with Beşiktaş and in the Football League with Brentford, Reading and Watford. Prior to becoming a professional player, Ferdinand had played non-league football with both Southall and Hayes. He earned 17 caps for England and was part of the Euro 96 and 1998 FIFA World Cup squads. He is the twelfth-highest scorer in the history of the Premier League, with 149 goals and he contributed a further 49 assists in the division.

Following retirement, Ferdinand has mainly found work as a pundit. He returned to Tottenham Hotspur in 2008 as striker coach, departing in 2014. He then returned to QPR, first as head of football operations and subsequently as director of football.

== Early and personal life ==
Ferdinand was born in Acton, Greater London. He is the second cousin of football-playing brothers Rio and Anton Ferdinand and a cousin of Kane Ferdinand.

His autobiography, Sir Les, was published in 1997.

Ferdinand was appointed a Member of the Order of the British Empire (MBE) in the 2005 Birthday Honours.

In an interview with the Evening Standard in February 2020, Ferdinand stated that fans racially abused him during his stints as a player and director of football.

== Club career ==
=== Early career ===
Ferdinand started his career in non-league football, first at Viking Sports before moving to Southall. He made his league debut for Southall in August 1984 against Chertsey Town, and was part of the team which reached the FA Vase final in 1986, losing 3–0 to Halesowen Town. Following this, Ferdinand moved to Hayes, where he scored 20 goals in 42 appearances in all competitions (including friendlies). He was spotted by Queens Park Rangers and moved there for £50,000.

=== Queens Park Rangers ===
Ferdinand made his QPR debut on 20 April 1987, aged 20, as a substitute in the 4–1 league defeat by Coventry City at Highfield Road – the first of two league appearances that season. He played a further league game in the 1987–88 season, and was loaned for three games to Third Division Brentford. In 1988, he was loaned to Turkish side Beşiktaş for a season, and performed well with 14 goals in 24 league games and he also got his first taste of silverware, helping the club to a 3–1 aggregate victory over Fenerbahçe in the Turkish Cup.

He returned to the QPR side for the 1989–90 season, and appeared in nine First Division matches as well as scoring his first two English league goals. He fared better in the 1990–91 season, playing in 18 league games and scoring eight goals as QPR ended up in a mid-table position. His 10 goals from 23 games in the 1991–92 season helped ensure QPR's status as founder members of the new Premier League for the 1992–93 season, and it was during this campaign that he established himself as a top striker, scoring 20 goals in 37 games as QPR finished fifth — the highest placed of all the London sides. In his autobiography, Sir Les, Ferdinand wrote of his pride at scoring a hat-trick in a 5–3 win against Everton at Goodison Park in April 1993, a place where he had previously received racist abuse:

The hat-trick at Everton was particularly pleasing because I had always had racial abuse at Everton from their supporters. Doing that to them gave me extra pleasure. There are certain things which stick in your mind during your career as a footballer and the racism at Goodison Park is one of them. Probably the worst thing I have encountered in my professional career has been racist letters coming from supporters – most of which, I have to say, have come from Everton fans. After I scored that hat-trick against them over the Easter period, the letters I got back were disgusting.

Ferdinand's fine form continued into 1993–94 season, during which his 16 goals from 36 games helped QPR finish ninth. Despite mounting speculation of a move to either Manchester United or Arsenal, he signed a two-year contract with QPR that summer. In the 1994–95 season, he scored 24 times in the Premier League and speculation grew that he would soon be on his way to a bigger club. In nearly a decade at Loftus Road, he played under four different managers – Jim Smith, Trevor Francis, Don Howe and Gerry Francis.

=== Newcastle United ===
Ferdinand was sold to Newcastle United in 1995 for £6 million, with Hayes receiving £600,000 due to a sell-on clause agreed following his move to QPR. With the money received, Hayes built a function suite and named it "The Ferdinand Suite" in his honour. His arrival at the club came nearly three years after the Magpies had offered QPR £3.3million for him during their First Division promotion season — but the offer had been turned down.

The spell on Tyneside was arguably Ferdinand's most successful club tenure. He scored 29 goals in his first season with Newcastle, and significantly contributed to the side's getting within touching distance of the Premier League title in the 1995–96 season. Newcastle led the league by 12 points at one stage, but were overhauled by Manchester United in the final three months of the season.

In both of his seasons on Tyneside, Ferdinand collected runners-up medals in the Premier League. In the second season, they contested a four-horse race with Manchester United, Arsenal and Liverpool, before the Red Devils won the title again. Midway through the 1996–97 season, however, came a change, as manager Kevin Keegan surprisingly departed Newcastle and was replaced by Kenny Dalglish. Despite the Scot being regretful to lose such a talented striker, it quickly became apparent Ferdinand would be dispensed to free up funds for further signings. In an interview with Sky Sports in 2019, Ferdinand admitted that he regretted leaving Newcastle and had hoped at the time to stay on Tyneside for the rest of his career.

Ferdinand scored 50 goals in only 84 games at Newcastle, forming a successful strike partnership with Alan Shearer. He was very highly thought of by the Newcastle supporters during his spell with the club and is known affectionately as "Sir Les" on Tyneside. He was inducted into the Newcastle United Foundation Hall of Fame on 7 November 2017.

=== Tottenham Hotspur ===
In 1997, Ferdinand was bought by Tottenham Hotspur, the club he supported as a boy, for £6 million. Ferdinand received a standing ovation when he returned to St James' Park, trying to put Alan Shearer's number 9 shirt on to complete a lap of honour, he broke down in tears and could only manage to put the shirt on inside out and back to front before being helped from the field. Injuries heavily disrupted his first season at the club, but towards the end of the campaign, he formed a good partnership with Jürgen Klinsmann, and the pair's goals saved Spurs from relegation from the Premier League. Ferdinand helped Spurs win the League Cup in 1999, defeating Leicester City 1–0 in the final at Wembley, but injuries restricted him to just 12 goals in his first three seasons at the club.

He improved his goal-scoring return over the next two seasons, contributing 10 goals in the 2000–01 season and a further 15 during the 2001–02 season. Ferdinand scored the 10,000th goal in Premier League history on 15 December 2001 in a 4–0 win against Fulham. He played in a second League Cup final for the club against Blackburn Rovers in 2002, but was thwarted by three saves by Rovers' goalkeeper Brad Friedel as Spurs lost 2–1.

=== Later career ===
After struggling to find a place in Spurs' first team season following Glenn Hoddle's purchase of Robbie Keane from Leeds United, he moved to West Ham United on 21 January 2003 for an undisclosed fee. He scored his first goal for the club against former club Tottenham Hotspur, but was unable to prevent the club's relegation from the Premier League and opted to remain in the top flight by signing for newly promoted Leicester City on a free transfer.

While at Leicester, Ferdinand scored 12 Premier League goals, despite being 37 years old. After the Foxes were relegated at the end of that season, he rejected a new contract and joined Bolton Wanderers. Ferdinand memorably scored against rivals Manchester United in the last minute, despite playing from a centre-back position, which looked to have given Bolton the win, but a goal from David Bellion even deeper in injury time gave the Red Devils a point.

He found opportunities from the start limited, but proved useful for all his experience when coming off the substitutes' bench, and scored against former club Tottenham in the League Cup, with what proved to be a mere consolation goal in a 4–3 thriller, which Bolton lost. He left the club on 2 January 2005. Four days later, he signed with Reading. His contract at the club lasted until the end of the 2004–05 season. He scored one league goal in his time with the Royals, in a 2–1 loss to Coventry City.

Ferdinand committed to non-contract terms with Watford during the 2005–06 season, but did not play a competitive game for the club and left after their promotion to the Premier League via the Championship playoffs. He retired from football a few months short of his 40th birthday.

== International career ==
Ferdinand made his England debut in February 1993 against San Marino, scoring the final goal in a 6–0 victory at Wembley. He was part of the Euro 96 and 1998 FIFA World Cup squads, although he did not feature in any of the tournament matches. He was capped 17 times, scoring five goals.

== Coaching career ==
On 5 November 2008, Ferdinand joined fellow ex-Tottenham player Tim Sherwood on the coaching staff of Tottenham Hotspur, to work with the strikers. Ferdinand left the club on 19 June 2014.

== Executive career ==
In October 2014, Ferdinand became head of football operations at Queens Park Rangers, before being appointed as director of football in February 2015.

On 16 June 2023, it was announced that Ferdinand had stepped down as director of football with the west London club, citing it was the right time to move on after eight years at the helm.

== Career statistics ==
Appearances and goals by club, season and competition
Club	Season	League			National cup (Note: Includes FA Cup, Turkish Cup)		League Cup (Note: Includes Football League Cup)		Other		Total	
Club	Season	Division	Apps	Goals	Apps	Goals	Apps	Goals	Apps	Goals	Apps	Goals
Queens Park Rangers	1986–87	First Division	2	0	0	0	0	0	—		2	0
Queens Park Rangers	1987–88	First Division	1	0	0	0	1	0	0	0	2	0
Queens Park Rangers	1989–90	First Division	9	2	0	0	0	0	—		9	2
Queens Park Rangers	1990–91	First Division	18	8	1	0	2	0	0	0	21	8
Queens Park Rangers	1991–92	First Division	23	10	0	0	2	2	1 (Note: Appearance in Full Members' Cup)	0	26	12
Queens Park Rangers	1992–93	Premier League	37	20	2	2	3	2	—		42	24
Queens Park Rangers	1993–94	Premier League	36	16	1	0	3	2	—		40	18
Queens Park Rangers	1994–95	Premier League	37	24	3	1	2	1	—		42	26
Queens Park Rangers	Total		163	80	7	3	13	7	1	0	184	90
Brentford (loan)	1987–88	Third Division	3	0	—		—		—		3	0
Beşiktaş (loan)	1988–89	Süper Lig	24	14	5	4	—		1 (Note: Appearance in UEFA Cup)	0	30	18
Newcastle United	1995–96	Premier League	37	25	2	1	5	3	–		44	29
Newcastle United	1996–97	Premier League	31	16	3	1	1	0	5 (Note: Four appearances and four goals in UEFA Cup, one appearance in Charity Shield)	4	40	21
Newcastle United	Total		68	41	5	2	6	3	5	4	84	50
Tottenham Hotspur	1997–98	Premier League	21	5	2	0	1	0	—		24	5
Tottenham Hotspur	1998–99	Premier League	24	5	7	0	4	0	—		35	5
Tottenham Hotspur	1999–2000	Premier League	9	2	0	0	0	0	0	0	9	2
Tottenham Hotspur	2000–01	Premier League	28	10	4	0	3	0	—		35	10
Tottenham Hotspur	2001–02	Premier League	25	9	3	1	5	5	—		33	15
Tottenham Hotspur	2002–03	Premier League	11	2	0	0	2	0	—		13	2
Tottenham Hotspur	Total		118	33	16	1	15	5	0	0	149	39
West Ham United	2002–03	Premier League	14	2	0	0	—		—		14	2
Leicester City	2003–04	Premier League	29	12	2	1	0	0	—		31	13
Bolton Wanderers	2004–05	Premier League	12	1	—		2	1	—		14	2
Reading	2004–05	Championship	12	1	2	0	—		—		14	1
Watford	2005–06	Championship	0	0	0	0	0	0	0	0	0	0
Career total			443	184	37	11	36	16	7	4	523	215

== Honours ==
Beşiktaş

- Turkish Cup: 1988–89

Tottenham Hotspur

- Football League Cup: 1998–99; runner-up: 2001–02

Individual

- PFA Players' Player of the Year: 1995–96
- PFA Team of the Year: 1995–96 Premier League
- North-East FWA Player of the Year: 1996
- Scorer of the 10,000th Premier League goal – Premier League 10 Seasons Awards (1992–93 – 2001–02)
- Leicester City Player of the Year: 2003–04
- Newcastle United Hall of Fame Inductee
- English Football Hall of Fame: 2026

== See also ==
- List of English association football families
