= David Seaman =

English footballer (born 1963)

David Seaman MBE
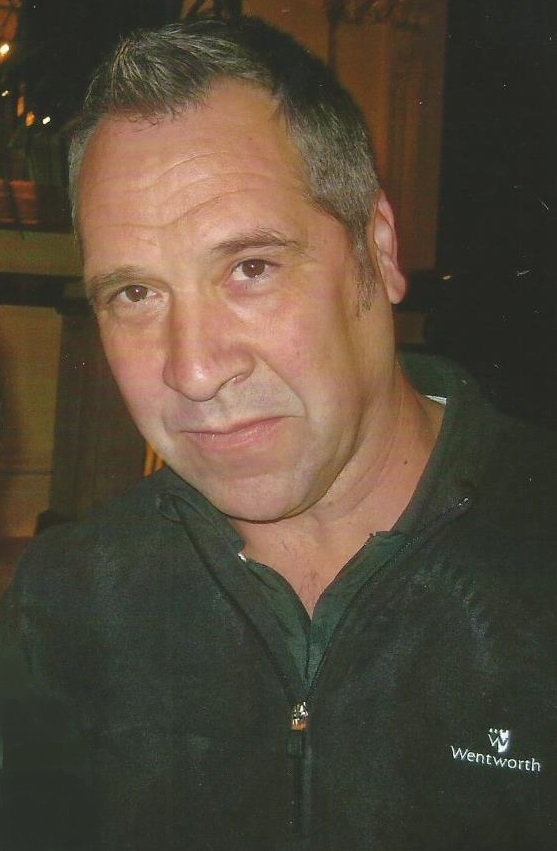
- Seaman in 2012

Personal information
- Full name: David Andrew Seaman
- Date of birth: 19 September 1963 (age 63)
- Place of birth: Rotherham, England
- Height: 6 ft 4 in (1.93 m)
- Position: Goalkeeper

Youth career
- 1981–1982: Leeds United

Senior career*
Years	Team	Apps	(Gls)
1982–1984	Peterborough United	91	(0)
1984–1986	Birmingham City	75	(0)
1986–1990	Queens Park Rangers	141	(0)
1990–2003	Arsenal	405	(0)
2003–2004	Manchester City	19	(0)
Total		731	(0)

International career
1984–1986	England U21	10	(0)
1987–1992	England B	6	(0)
1988–2002	England	75	(0)
- * Club domestic league appearances and goals

David Andrew Seaman (born 19 September 1963) is an English former footballer who played as a goalkeeper. In a career lasting from 1981 to 2004, he is best known for his time playing for Arsenal. He won 75 caps for England, and is the country's third-most capped goalkeeper, level with Joe Hart, and after Peter Shilton and Jordan Pickford. In 1997, he was awarded the MBE for services to football and was nominated for the 1998 Ballon d'Or. In addition, he is one of the few players to have made over 1,000 career appearances (nearly 1,050).

Seaman began his career in the Football League for Peterborough United, Birmingham City and Queens Park Rangers. The peak of his career was during his period as Arsenal and England goalkeeper in the 1990s and early 2000s. During his time at Arsenal, he won three league championships (1991, 1998, 2002), four FA Cups (1993, 1998, 2002, 2003), the League Cup in 1993 and the European Cup Winners Cup in 1994. During this time he also played for England in the 1998 and 2002 FIFA World Cups, and Euro 96 and Euro 2000. After leaving Arsenal, he played in the Premier League for Manchester City. He retired in 2004 due to a recurring shoulder injury. In June 2012, he was appointed goalkeeping coach of Combined Counties League club Wembley.

Seaman is considered to be one of the greatest goalkeepers of all time by his compatriots, as well as one of the best shot-stoppers in Premier League and English football history. He placed second in the IFFHS World's Best Goalkeeper of the Year award in 1996, behind Andreas Köpke, while he placed 32nd, alongside Enrico Albertosi, in the European Keeper of the Century vote, which was organised by the same organisation, the fourth–highest ranked English goalkeeper. In 2013, James McNicholas of Bleacher Report described Seaman as "the greatest goalkeeper in Arsenal's history." In addition to his goalkeeping ability, Seaman was also a highly recognisable figure on the pitch due to his moustache and the ponytail hairstyle he wore for part of his career.

Seaman's save from Paul Peschisolido of Sheffield United in the 2002–03 FA Cup semi-final was described in the media as one of the best ever. Notable lows came with two costly errors, both from long-range efforts—conceding a last-minute goal in the 1995 UEFA Cup Winners' Cup Final to Nayim of Real Zaragoza, and conceding to a Ronaldinho free kick against Brazil in the 2002 FIFA World Cup quarter-final. Seaman is left-handed, but threw the ball with his right arm and kicked with his right foot.

== Club career ==
=== Early career ===
Seaman was born in Rotherham, West Riding of Yorkshire. He attended Kimberworth Comprehensive School. He began his career at Leeds United, the club he supported as a boy. Much to his disappointment, he was not wanted by then-manager Eddie Gray, who had been his favourite player. Seaman went to Fourth Division club Peterborough United for a £4,000 fee in August 1982, where he began to make a name for himself.

Just over two years later, in October 1984, Second Division Birmingham City paid £100,000 for Seaman's services. They ended up being promoted at the end of that season, but were relegated again at the end of the following season. Seaman was not to follow them back to the Second Division, as in August 1986, he moved to Queens Park Rangers for £225,000. Playing for a higher profile club on a plastic pitch, he would be called up by the England national football team for the first time in November 1988. Whilst at QPR, Seaman was coached by Bob Wilson (Arsenal's double-winner in 1971), who was to work with him for more than a decade.

=== Arsenal ===
In 1990, long before the current transfer window system had come to English football, there was still a transfer deadline a few weeks before the end of the season. Arsenal, who had won the league in 1989, wanted to sign Seaman, but the deal involved Arsenal's keeper John Lukic heading the opposite way on loan. Lukic did not want to do this, and the deal broke down and remained unresolved when the deadline passed. As soon as the season ended and clubs were allowed to buy players again, Arsenal manager George Graham came back for Seaman, with £1.3 million (at the time a British record for a goalkeeper) being the agreed fee. Lukic, who was highly popular amongst Arsenal fans, left to rejoin Leeds.

Seaman's time at Arsenal coincided with one of the most successful periods in the club's history. The 1990–91 season saw Seaman concede only 18 goals when playing in every match of the 38-game season as Arsenal regained the league title.

Arsenal won both the FA Cup and the League Cup in 1993 and supplemented this a year later with the European Cup Winners' Cup. Arsenal began their victorious League Cup campaign against Millwall and after two legs the game went to a penalty shootout. Seaman saved three of the four Millwall penalties from Malcolm Allen, Jon Goodman and Colin Cooper to help his side progress.

In 1995, George Graham was sacked, and Arsenal came close to becoming the first club to retain the Cup Winners' Cup, with Seaman earning a reputation as a penalty-saving specialist after saving from Siniša Mihajlović, Vladimir Jugović and Attilio Lombardo in Arsenal's semi-final shoot-out against Sampdoria, all the while playing with two cracked ribs. Arsenal lost in the final to Real Zaragoza, at the Parc des Princes in Paris, when Nayim scored a goal in the final minute of extra time with a 40-yard lob over Seaman.

In August 1996, Arsène Wenger became the new manager of Arsenal. Wenger rated Seaman highly and in 1998, Seaman helped the team to the Premier League and FA Cup double. In 1998–99, Seaman played in 32 league matches, as Arsenal came within one point of retaining the Premier League and lost in the FA Cup semi-finals to Manchester United. The following season, Seaman managed to reach the 2000 UEFA Cup Final, which Arsenal drew 0–0 with Galatasaray, but lost on penalties.

In 2002, Seaman won the Premier League and the FA Cup again to complete his second career double, although Arsenal's other goalkeepers Stuart Taylor (10 appearances) and Richard Wright (12 appearances) also won championship medals, due mainly to Seaman's absence through injuries. A highlight of this season was when Seaman dramatically saved a Gareth Barry penalty as Arsenal won 2–1 at Aston Villa.

Despite his international career ending so flatly and accusations his mobility had faded with age, the 2002–03 season—Seaman's last at Arsenal—ended on a high note. He began the season with saving a Freddie Kanoute penalty in a draw at Upton Park. In the FA Cup, he made a save against Sheffield United's Paul Peschisolido in the semi-finals, which former Manchester United goalkeeper Peter Schmeichel, a pundit for the BBC on the day, dubbed "the best save I've ever seen". Arsenal were defending a 1–0 lead, when with less than ten minutes to go, Peschisolido had a header towards an apparently open goal from six yards out with Seaman seemingly stranded at the near post. Seaman leapt sideways and backwards, managing to stretch his right arm behind him and scoop the ball back and away from both his goal and the opposing players ready to pounce on a rebound. The match was Seaman's 1,000th professional career game. Seaman went on to captain the team during the 2003 FA Cup Final in the absence of injured Patrick Vieira and keep another clean sheet at the Millennium Stadium as they defeated Southampton 1–0. His final act with Arsenal was to lift the FA Cup, which was his ninth major trophy with his team. Seaman played in goal for Arsenal more times than anyone else, and is second after Ray Parlour in the all-time Premier League appearances chart for Arsenal, with 325 to his name. In June 2008 he was voted seventh in the list of 50 Gunners' Greatest Players.

=== Manchester City ===
Released by Arsenal, Seaman joined up with Kevin Keegan at Manchester City in the summer of 2003, but Seaman's career at the City of Manchester Stadium did not last long. Whilst out of action due to injury, Seaman announced his immediate retirement in January 2004 at the age of 40. His last act at City was to help Keegan select his successor in goal, David James — the man who had ousted him as England's first-choice goalkeeper a little over a year earlier.

In November 2005, Paul Merson and Walsall approached Seaman, and later ex-Wales goalkeeper Neville Southall and Chris Woods, to play in an FA Cup game at Merthyr Tydfil as their two first-choice keepers, Joe Murphy and Andy Oakes, were unavailable. Seaman was forced to turn this offer down, as it would have constituted a breach in the terms of his retirement insurance pay-out for his recurring shoulder injury.

== International career ==
Seaman made his England debut in 1988 and appeared for the side in fifteen consecutive years, a national record, since equalled by Rio Ferdinand.

Seaman earned his first England cap under Bobby Robson in a friendly against Saudi Arabia in November 1988. Robson selected him as England's third-choice goalkeeper behind Peter Shilton and Chris Woods at the 1990 FIFA World Cup, but after arriving in Italy, he had to pull out of the squad due to injury and was replaced by Dave Beasant.

Seaman remained a member of the England squad under new manager Graham Taylor, although he was not selected for Euro 1992 in Sweden. During qualification for the 1994 World Cup, Seaman played in the crucial game against the Netherlands, which England lost 2–0; he also played in the final match against San Marino, in which Davide Gualtieri scored after 8.3 seconds before England recovered to win 7–1. England ultimately failed to qualify for the tournament in the United States.

Seaman cemented his place as the undisputed number-one keeper with the arrival of Terry Venables as manager, and played every minute of every match during UEFA Euro 1996 on home soil. Seaman saved two spot-kicks in the tournament; the first a penalty in normal play from Scotland's Gary McAllister in a group match, while England were 1–0 up (Paul Gascoigne scored soon after to make it 2–0). Then, after England's quarter-final against Spain ended scoreless, Seaman saved Miguel Ángel Nadal's kick in the shootout to knock Spain out of the tournament. England eventually were eliminated in the semi-final by Germany on penalties, after Andreas Köpke saved the penalty taken by Gareth Southgate. Seaman was named alongside Golden Boot winner Alan Shearer and winger Steve McManaman in the UEFA "Team of the Tournament". Euro 96 sponsor Philips named him "Player of the Tournament".

Seaman remained the first choice under the management of Glenn Hoddle for the 1998 FIFA World Cup in France. Seaman kept two clean sheets in the group stage as England finished second behind Romania. In the round of 16 England faced Argentina. Seaman conceded a penalty as the game finished 2–2, before England lost on penalties. Kevin Keegan selected him for UEFA Euro 2000 in Belgium and the Netherlands, where he started against both Portugal and Germany but sustained an injury in his warm-up exercises for the third game against Romania and was replaced by Nigel Martyn. England lost the match and went out in the first round.

Seaman was part of Sven-Göran Eriksson's 2002 FIFA World Cup squad and played every game in South Korea and Japan as England reached the quarter-finals, turning back a second-half offensive to shut out arch-rivals Argentina 1–0 in the group stage after English captain David Beckham scored a penalty. In the quarter-final against Brazil, Seaman was caught off his line by Ronaldinho's long-range free kick, as England lost 2–1; he blamed himself for the error.

The result led to a debate about whether Seaman should remain England's number one. He remained England's first-choice goalkeeper until a Euro 2004 qualifier in October 2002 against Macedonia. In this match, he let in a goal directly from a corner kick by Artim Šakiri in a 2–2 draw and brought further press criticism. This was Seaman's last appearance for the England national team, as Eriksson dropped him in favour of David James.

== Style of play ==
At his peak during the 1990s, Seaman was regarded as one of the best goalkeepers in the world, earning praise from other leading goalkeepers such as Sepp Maier and Francesco Toldo. A tall and well–rounded keeper, with a large frame, he was known for his bravery, quick reflexes, agility, and excellent positional sense, as well as his reliable handling and ability to judge the ball, which allowed him to come out and collect crosses and command his area effectively, earning him the nickname "safe hands" in the media; although he was not particularly flashy in his style of goalkeeping, he was regarded as an efficient and generally reliable goalkeeper, who was known for his cool demeanour, authoritative presence, and calm composure in goal, as well as his leadership and ability to organise his back–line, which inspired a sense of confidence in his teammates. He was also adept at stopping penalties. Seaman is left-handed, but threw the ball with his right arm, and also kicked with his right foot.

Despite his ability in his prime, and his overall longevity, he was also known for being inconsistent and prone to errors on occasion, in particular in his later career, following a series of injuries, and also due to his own advancing age, which ultimately led to his physical decline and a series of less convincing performances; he also frequently struggled to deal with long–range shots throughout his career. In 2014, when recounting his famous lobbed goal against Seaman in the 1995 Cup Winners' Cup final, Nayim stated that his attempt was premeditated, as during his time in England, he came to learn that Arsenal usually played with a high defensive line, with Seaman essentially acting as a sweeper-keeper due to his tendency to stay off his line. In 2006, The Irish Times described Seaman as a "serial choker," due to several high-profile errors he committed in key matches, in particular at international level, and described him as one of several unreliable keepers that played for England since the end of the "tradition of solid goalkeeping which seemed unbreakable through the era of Banks, Clemence, Shilton, etc.", a notion with which Sriram Ilango of Bleacher Report concurred in 2009. In 2018, Eurosport noted that: "Since the retirement of Peter Shilton, the position of England's goalkeeper has claimed plenty of casualties. Even the most stable of its occupants, David Seaman, will be remembered for the embarrassment caused when Ronaldinho sent a free-kick floating over his head at the 2002 World Cup." While Seaman possessed a deep goal kick and a long throw, which suited Arsenal's quick counter–attacking style of play under manager Arsène Wenger, he was not particularly adept with the ball at his feet, and his distribution was also not always reliable; as such he preferred to clear the ball away when receiving back-passes, rather than attempting to play it out from the back.

== Later career ==
Seaman began working on his coaching badge with a view to coaching goalkeepers but decided to pause after learning that he would first need a badge in outfield coaching in which he had no interest. His on-screen presence made him a popular choice for chat shows and televised appearances during his sporting career, and he can occasionally be spotted on British television. Whilst still a player, he appeared in a cameo role in a BBC film based around the events of England's successful Euro 1996 tournament, starring Rachel Weisz and Neil Morrissey, entitled My Summer with Des. He also became the spokesman for Yorkshire Tea during the early 1990s. He briefly replaced Gary Lineker as team captain on the television quiz They Think It's All Over, before producers decided to drop him in favour of former Arsenal teammate Ian Wright.

In December 2004, following his retirement from professional football, he became one of the celebrities to take part in Strictly Ice Dancing, an ice dance version of Strictly Come Dancing, in which celebrities are paired with professional dancers. He joined the show at late notice, replacing Paul Gascoigne. With just eight days to prepare for the show, broadcast on BBC One on 26 December, Seaman and his professional partner Zoia Birmingham managed to win the competition. The other competitors spent a month in training for the show.

In late 2005, he had his trademark ponytail cut off on live television for charity, which ended negotiatory talks with such companies as L'Oréal, who wanted to sponsor his hair as they had with David Ginola. He returned to the ice for another ice-dancing series, Dancing on Ice, broadcast on ITV. The series started on 14 January 2006, and Seaman ended in fourth place. He has also appeared on All Star Family Fortunes.

Seaman also hosts a "Safe Hands" charity golf event annually, and has released two football-themed DVDs entitled David Seaman's Goalkeeping Nightmares in 2003 and Jeepers Keepers in 2004. Seaman has also played in all six Soccer Aid matches for England.

In June 2012, Seaman joined Combined Counties League club Wembley as goalkeeping coach for their 2012–13 FA Cup campaign, as part of a television documentary following the club's attempt to play at Wembley. Former international players Graeme Le Saux, Ray Parlour, Martin Keown, Claudio Caniggia and Brian McBride joined the playing squad, with former England manager Terry Venables as technical advisor.

In 2019 and 2020, Seaman featured in both seasons of ITV show Harry's Heroes, which featured former football manager Harry Redknapp attempting get a squad of former England international footballers back fit and healthy for a game against Germany legends.

In 2021, he began presenting his own podcast series Seaman Says. The series followed England throughout UEFA Euro 2020, with a second series starting at the beginning of the new season in August.

In October 2022, Seaman and his wife Frankie Poultney appeared in the second series of The Masked Dancer as "Pillar and Post". They were unmasked in the fifth episode.

== Personal life ==
Seaman married his first wife, Sandra, in 1985; the marriage lasted ten years. He met his second wife, Debbie Rodgers, in 1995. They were married at Castle Ashby House in Castle Ashby in Northamptonshire on 15 July 1998; the couple separated in 2009 and were divorced in 2010. On 7 February 2015, Seaman married his third wife Frankie Poultney, best known as a professional skater on Dancing on Ice. Seaman announced their engagement in December 2013; the pair met in 2008, and had been in a relationship since 2009. He has four children: two sons from his first marriage, and a son and daughter from his second marriage.

Seaman's autobiography – Safe Hands – was released in 2000, published by Orion.

== Career statistics ==
=== Club ===
Appearances and goals by club, season and competition
Club	Season	League			FA Cup		League Cup		Europe		Other		Total	
Club	Season	Division	Apps	Goals	Apps	Goals	Apps	Goals	Apps	Goals	Apps	Goals	Apps	Goals
Leeds United	1981–82	First Division	0	0	0	0	0	0	—		1	0	1	0
Peterborough United	1982–83	Fourth Division	38	0	4	0	4	0	—		3 (Note: Appearances in Football League Group Cup)	0	49	0
Peterborough United	1983–84	Fourth Division	45	0	1	0	4	0	—		0	0	50	0
Peterborough United	1984–85	Fourth Division	8	0	—		2	0	—		—		10	0
Peterborough United	Total		91	0	5	0	10	0	—		3	0	109	0
Birmingham City	1984–85	Second Division	33	0	4	0	—		—		—		37	0
Birmingham City	1985–86	First Division	42	0	1	0	4	0	—		—		47	0
Birmingham City	Total		75	0	5	0	4	0	—		—		84	0
Queens Park Rangers	1986–87	First Division	41	0	4	0	3	0	—		—		48	0
Queens Park Rangers	1987–88	First Division	32	0	1	0	3	0	—		0	0	36	0
Queens Park Rangers	1988–89	First Division	35	0	3	0	4	0	—		4 (Note: Three appearances in Full Members' Cup, one in Football League Centenary Trophy)	0	46	0
Queens Park Rangers	1989–90	First Division	33	0	9	0	3	0	—		—		45	0
Queens Park Rangers	Total		141	0	17	0	13	0	—		4	0	175	0
Arsenal	1990–91	First Division	38	0	8	0	4	0	—		—		50	0
Arsenal	1991–92	First Division	42	0	1	0	3	0	4 (Note: Appearances in European Cup)	0	1 (Note: Appearance in Charity Shield)	0	51	0
Arsenal	1992–93	Premier League	39	0	8	0	9	0	—		—		56	0
Arsenal	1993–94	Premier League	39	0	3	0	5	0	9 (Note: Appearances in UEFA Cup Winners' Cup)	0	1	0	57	0
Arsenal	1994–95	Premier League	31	0	2	0	6	0	9	0	2 (Note: Appearance in European Super Cup)	0	50	0
Arsenal	1995–96	Premier League	38	0	2	0	7	0	—		—		47	0
Arsenal	1996–97	Premier League	22	0	2	0	2	0	2 (Note: Appearances in UEFA Cup)	0	—		28	0
Arsenal	1997–98	Premier League	31	0	4	0	1	0	2	0	—		38	0
Arsenal	1998–99	Premier League	32	0	5	0	0	0	6 (Note: Appearances in UEFA Champions League)	0	1	0	44	0
Arsenal	1999–2000	Premier League	24	0	2	0	1	0	9 (Note: Two appearances in UEFA Champions League, seven in UEFA Cup)	0	0	0	36	0
Arsenal	2000–01	Premier League	24	0	5	0	0	0	10	0	—		39	0
Arsenal	2001–02	Premier League	17	0	1	0	0	0	7	0	—		25	0
Arsenal	2002–03	Premier League	28	0	5	0	0	0	9	0	1	0	43	0
Arsenal	Total		405	0	48	0	38	0	67	0	6	0	564	0
Manchester City	2003–04	Premier League	19	0	1	0	1	0	5	0	—		26	0
Career total			731	0	76	0	66	0	72	0	14	0	959	0

=== International ===
Appearances and goals by national team and year
National team	Year	Apps	Goals
England	1988	1	0
England	1989	1	0
England	1990	1	0
England	1991	4	0
England	1992	2	0
England	1993	3	0
England	1994	4	0
England	1995	5	0
England	1996	11	0
England	1997	6	0
England	1998	9	0
England	1999	8	0
England	2000	7	0
England	2001	5	0
England	2002	8	0
Total		75	0

== Honours ==
Arsenal

- Football League First Division: 1990–91
- Premier League: 1997–98, 2001–02
- FA Cup: 1992–93, 1997–98, 2001–02, 2002–03; runner-up: 2000–01
- Football League Cup: 1992–93
- FA Charity/Community Shield: 1991 (shared), 1998, 2002
- European/UEFA Cup Winners' Cup: 1993–94; runner-up: 1994–95
- UEFA Cup runner-up: 1999–2000

Individual

- PFA Team of the Year: 1990–91 First Division, 1996–97 Premier League
- Premier League Player of the Month: April 1995
- UEFA European Championship Team of the Tournament: 1996
- Ballon d'Or nominee: 1996, 1998
- Premier League 10 Seasons Awards (1992–2002):
  - Domestic Team of the Decade
  - Goalkeeper with most clean sheets (130)
- Most Premier League clean sheets: 1993–94, 1998–99
- English Football Hall of Fame: 2016

== See also ==
- List of men's footballers with the most official appearances

== Bibliography ==
- Seaman, David (2000). Safe Hands: My Autobiography. London: Orion. p. 256. ISBN 07-52831-83-6.
