= Gavin O'Toole =

Irish footballer

Personal information
- Birth name: Gavin O'Toole
- Born: September 19, 1975; Ireland

Gavin O'Toole (born 19 September 1975) is an Irish footballer who played in The Football League for Hereford United on loan from Coventry City.
