= Sean Flynn (footballer) =

English footballer and manager (born 1968)

Personal information
- Full name: Sean Michael Flynn
- Date of birth: 13 March 1968 (age 58)
- Place of birth: Birmingham, England
- Height: 5 ft 8 in (1.73 m)
- Position: Midfielder

Youth career
- 1988–1991: Halesowen Town

Senior career*
| Years | Team | Apps | (Gls) |
| 1991–1995 | Coventry City | 97 | (9) |
| 1995–1997 | Derby County | 59 | (3) |
| 1997 | → Stoke City (loan) | 5 | (0) |
| 1997–2000 | West Bromwich Albion | 109 | (7) |
| 2000–2002 | Tranmere Rovers | 66 | (6) |
| 2002–2003 | Kidderminster Harriers | 51 | (2) |
| 2003–2004 | Evesham United | | |
| 2004–2005 | Redditch United | | |
| 2005 | Evesham United | | |
| 2005–2008 | Redditch United | | |
| 2008–2009 | Bodmin Town | | |
| 2009 | Mullion | | |
| 2009–2011 | Falmouth Town | | |
| 2011–2012 | Penzance | | |
| 2012 | Falmouth Town | | |
| Total | | 387 | (27) |

Managerial career
- 2009–2018: Mullion
- * Club domestic league appearances and goals

Sean Michael Flynn (born 13 March 1968) is an English football coach and former professional player who played as a midfielder.

Flynn played in the Premier League for Coventry City and Derby County, and in the Football League for Stoke City, West Bromwich Albion and Tranmere Rovers and Kidderminster Harriers. He then moved into non-league football with clubs including Evesham United, Redditch United, Bodmin Town and Falmouth Town.

He was briefly player/manager of Mullion as well as holding various coaching roles at other clubs he has played for in recent years.

== Playing career ==
=== Coventry City ===
Flynn signed for Coventry City from non-league Halesowen Town in December 1991 and made a goalscoring debut on Boxing Day 1991 at Sheffield United, eventually going on to record 105 games and 10 goals for the Sky Blues over the next 5 years. In August 1995, after being told by then-Coventry manager Ron Atkinson, that he was no longer required at the club.

=== Derby County ===
Flynn dropped a division to Division One to become one of Jim Smith's first signings at Derby County for a fee of £250,000. Flynn's time at Derby proved to be successful as he was part of the side which finished runner-up to Sunderland in the 1995–96 Division One table and earn promotion to the FA Premier League for the first time. Flynn started the Premier League campaign in the Derby first team, scoring an 80th-minute winner at Blackburn Rovers in Derby's 5th game of the season to earn them their maiden win of a season which saw the Rams eventually finish 12th, but eventually found himself pushed to the fringes of the Derby squad, and joined Stoke City on loan in March 1997 where he made five appearances. After 65 games and 3 goals for Derby.

=== Later career ===
Flynn made the switch to his boyhood club West Bromwich Albion for a fee of £260,000 in August 1997.

As a West Bromwich Albion fan, one of the highlights of his career was when he captained the team. He played 122 games and scored 8 goals for the Baggies. In July 2000, Flynn moved on a free transfer to Tranmere Rovers and spent two years there playing 82 games and scoring 11 goals in all competitions. Flynn signed for Kidderminster Harriers in August 2002 on a free transfer and made 57 appearances scoring two goals before leaving in the September 2003.

=== Non League ===
Flynn played 436 games and scored 34 goals in his years as a pro footballer. He joined Evesham United in 2003, staying until 2004 when he moved to Redditch United. He had moved back to Evesham and then back again to Redditch by 2005 and eventually stayed with Redditch until 2008.

As well as running his business he joined Bodmin Town in 2008 where he went on to win a league and cup domestic treble, as well as player of the year, managers player of the year and supporters player of the year. In 2009, he joined Mullion as player/manager but left shortly afterward to team up with former Bodmin manager Alan Carey at Falmouth Town. Carey appointed Flynn as player/assistant manager and he remained with the club until joining Penzance in 2011. He returned to Falmouth as a player in March 2012.

== Coaching career ==
In January 2009, Flynn was appointed manager of Cornwall-based Jolly Combination League side Mullion FC.

== Career statistics ==
| Club | Season | League | | | FA Cup | | League Cup | | Other^{[A]} | | Total | |
| Club | Season | Division | Apps | Goals | Apps | Goals | Apps | Goals | Apps | Goals | Apps | Goals |
|---|---|---|---|---|---|---|---|---|---|---|---|---|
| Coventry City | 1991–92 | First Division | 22 | 2 | 0 | 0 | 0 | 0 | 0 | 0 | 22 | 2 |
| Coventry City | 1992–93 | Premier League | 7 | 0 | 0 | 0 | 0 | 0 | 0 | 0 | 7 | 0 |
| Coventry City | 1993–94 | Premier League | 36 | 3 | 1 | 0 | 2 | 0 | 0 | 0 | 39 | 3 |
| Coventry City | 1994–95 | Premier League | 32 | 4 | 2 | 0 | 3 | 1 | 0 | 0 | 37 | 5 |
| Coventry City | Total | | 97 | 9 | 3 | 0 | 5 | 1 | 0 | 0 | 105 | 10 |
| Derby County | 1995–96 | First Division | 42 | 2 | 1 | 0 | 3 | 0 | 0 | 0 | 46 | 2 |
| Derby County | 1996–97 | Premier League | 17 | 1 | 2 | 0 | 0 | 0 | 0 | 0 | 19 | 1 |
| Derby County | Total | | 59 | 3 | 3 | 0 | 3 | 0 | 0 | 0 | 65 | 3 |
| Stoke City (loan) | 1996–97 | First Division | 5 | 0 | 0 | 0 | 0 | 0 | 0 | 0 | 5 | 0 |
| Stoke City (loan) | Total | | 5 | 0 | 0 | 0 | 0 | 0 | 0 | 0 | 5 | 0 |
| West Bromwich Albion | 1997–98 | First Division | 35 | 2 | 1 | 0 | 4 | 0 | 0 | 0 | 40 | 2 |
| West Bromwich Albion | 1998–99 | First Division | 38 | 2 | 1 | 0 | 2 | 0 | 0 | 0 | 41 | 2 |
| West Bromwich Albion | 1999–2000 | First Division | 36 | 4 | 0 | 0 | 5 | 1 | 0 | 0 | 41 | 5 |
| West Bromwich Albion | Total | | 109 | 7 | 2 | 0 | 11 | 1 | 0 | 0 | 122 | 7 |
| Tranmere Rovers | 2000–01 | First Division | 35 | 1 | 4 | 0 | 5 | 0 | 0 | 0 | 44 | 1 |
| Tranmere Rovers | 2001–02 | Second Division | 31 | 5 | 4 | 3 | 3 | 2 | 0 | 0 | 38 | 10 |
| Tranmere Rovers | Total | | 66 | 6 | 8 | 3 | 8 | 2 | 0 | 0 | 82 | 11 |
| Kidderminster Harriers | 2002–03 | Third Division | 45 | 2 | 1 | 0 | 1 | 0 | 3 | 0 | 50 | 2 |
| Kidderminster Harriers | 2003–04 | Third Division | 6 | 0 | 0 | 0 | 1 | 0 | 0 | 0 | 7 | 0 |
| Kidderminster Harriers | Total | | 51 | 2 | 1 | 0 | 2 | 0 | 3 | 0 | 57 | 2 |
| Career total | | | 387 | 28 | 17 | 3 | 33 | 4 | 3 | 0 | 440 | 35 |

A. The "Other" column constitutes appearances and goals in the Football League Trophy.
