= Andy Ducros =

English footballer

Personal information
- Full name: Andrew Ducros
- Date of birth: 16 September 1977 (age 49)
- Place of birth: Evesham, England
- Position: Striker

Youth career
- 1993–1994: Coventry City

Senior career*
Years	Team	Apps	(Gls)
1994–1999	Coventry City	10	(0)
1999–2000	Nuneaton Borough	36	(9)
2000–2003	Kidderminster Harriers	64	(4)
2002	→ Nuneaton Borough (loan)	5	(0)
2002–2003	→ Nuneaton Borough (loan)	5	(1)
2003–2007	Burton Albion	132	(12)
2007–2009	Solihull Moors		
2009–2010	Redditch United		
2010	Evesham United		
- * Club domestic league appearances and goals as of 22:00, 10 April 2019 (UTC)

Andrew Ducros (born 16 September 1977) is an English former footballer who played for Coventry City in the Premier League.

== Playing career ==
Ducros began his career at Coventry City as a trainee in 1994. He Played several games in the first team at Coventry City before being sold on to Nuneaton Borough in 1999. He has since played for Kidderminster Harriers and Burton Albion, after release from his contract in June 2007, he moved on to Solihull Moors.

=== Evesham United ===
On 2 February 2010, Ducros signed for Zamaretto League Premier Division side Evesham United from Redditch United.

Andy made his debut for Evesham United the following day in a 2–1 away defeat to Chippenham Town, but limped off on the 34th minute with a calf strain, and was replaced by Leon Woodley.
