= Mika Simmons =

British actress (born 1976)

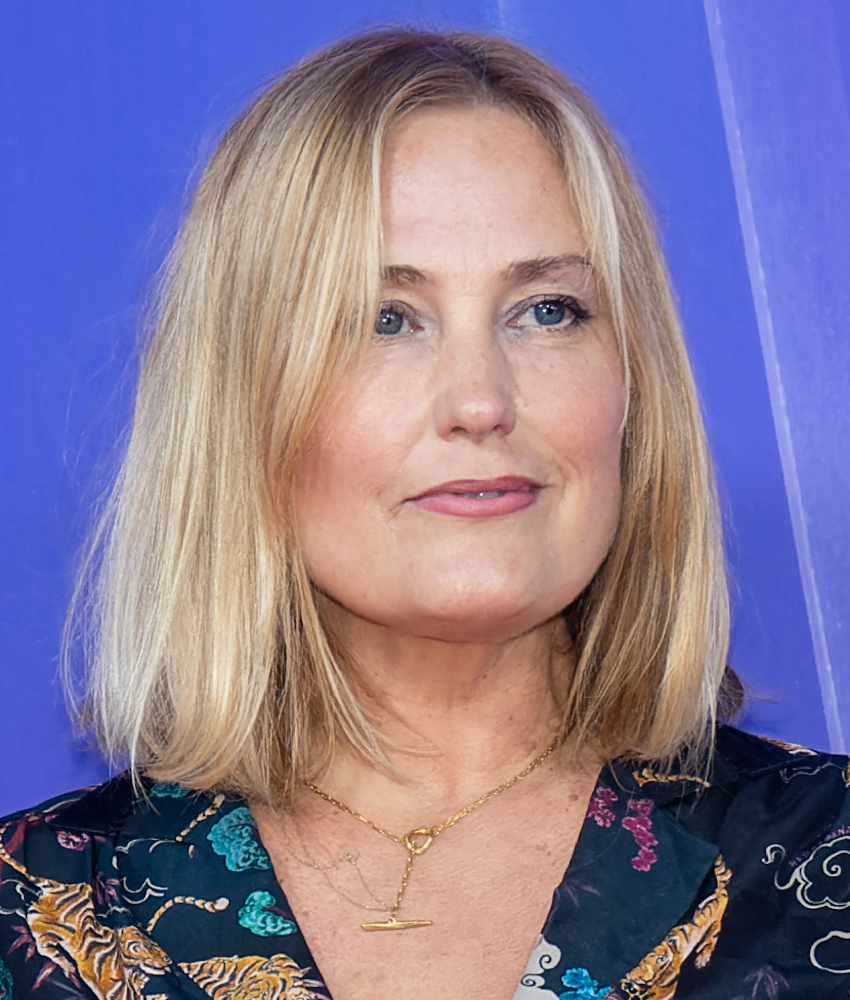
- Born: 18 March 1976 (age 50); Greenwich, London, UK
- Education: University of Leeds
- Alma mater: Drama Studio London
- Occupations: Actress; film-maker; writer; director
- Years active: 1998–present
- Relatives: Keir Simmons (brother)
- Website: MikaSimmons.com

Mika Simmons is a British actress and film-maker who is known for playing Queen Anora in the Dragon Age series, the BAFTA winning Falling Apart, the BBC's Showtrial, the award-winning Rain Stops Play, and My Week with Maisy.

Simmons is also a campaigner for women's health. In 2013, she started a charity Lady Garden Foundation, which aims to raise awareness of gynaecological cancers and fund research into treatments. She interviews experts and survivors about their experiences with women's health on her podcast The Happy Vagina.

== Early life ==
Simmons was born in Greenwich, London. Her brother is journalist Keir Simmons. Aged six, her family moved to Somerset where she attended Wellsway Comprehensive school and joined Bristol Youth Theatre. She then attended University of Leeds to study theatre, graduating with a BA in English Literature and Theatre Studies. Following graduation, Simmons moved to London to train as an actress at the Drama Studio London.

== Career ==
In 1998, Simmons was cast in the role of "Prudence" in ITV's Frenchman's Creek, a TV film based on the novel of the same name. In 2002, she appeared in Channel 4's TV movie, Falling Apart, a period drama, about domestic violence in a middle-class relationship in Britain. In 2011, Simmons played in the play, You Once Said Yes, which won both the Fringe First and Total Theatre awards.

Simmons has appeared in the ITV drama, Unforgotten. In 2016, she appeared in Film London's short Balcony. The film went on to win a Crystal Bear at the Berlin Film Festival. In 2019, she played a part in Us Among the Stones, directed by D.R. (Dictynna) Hood. In 2020, she appeared in the BBC drama Showtrial. In 2023, Simmons played Jill in Disruption at Off West End Park Theatre alongside Nathaniel Curtis.

In 2019, Simmons wrote and directed her first short film, Rain Stops Play, a comedy short about sex and the sexes, featuring Tara Fitzgerald and produced by Jackie Green and Roberta Moore. It won the Silver Remi for Best Comedy Short at the Houston Film Festival. The film has been shown at Underwire Festival and Portobello Film Festival and premiered at Fragments Festival, Genesis Cinema, London.

In 2020, Simmons started The Happy Vagina platform "dedicated to opening up the conversation around women's experience and gynaecological health" and her podcast, in which she discusses sex and intimacy with well-known women.

Simmons' first book The Happy Vagina was published on 4 August 2022.

== Activism ==
Simmons is co-founder and co-chair of the Ginsburg Women's Health Board, working with government towards closing the gender health gap.

Simmons is one of the six women who in 2013 co-founded the Lady Garden Foundation, a charity which raises awareness and funding for gynaecological health. The charity has been supported by Topshop, Sarah Ferguson, and Princess Beatrice. It has raised over £1,000,000 since 2014 to assist research at the Royal Marsden Hospital into treatments including the use of Olaparib, led by Susana Banerjee who inspired Simmons to start the foundation.

In 2017, Simmons was chosen as one of 40 women to front Lancôme's campaign with the strapline "My power is acting" and a brief profile. In 2021, Simmons was chosen as one of five Harper's Bazaar visionaries for the year.

== Filmography ==
=== Film ===
Year	Title	Role	Notes
2005	Ripley Under Ground	Sandy	
2010	Going Herbal	June	Short films
2013	Magpie	Olivia Ball	Short films
2014	Through the Hawthorn	Sam's Voice	Short films
2015	Westminster Girls	Jess	Short films
2015	Balcony	Kate	Short films
2019	Rain Stops Play	–	Short film. Writer, producer & director
2019	Us Among the Stones	Rose	
2020	Breach	–	Short film. Writer & director
2020	All My Love	Joanna Spector	Short films
2021	Birthday Boy	Kris	Short films
2024	The People Before	Miranda	
2024	My Week with Maisy	–	Short film. Director
2025	The Secret Santa Project	Barbara	

=== Television ===
Year	Title	Role	Notes
1998	Frenchman's Creek	Prudence	Television film
2000	Happy Birthday Shakespeare	Sally	Television film
2000	Without Motive	Rosie	Series 1; episode 6: "A Rattled Man"
2002	Falling Apart	Sally	Television film
2003	Casualty	Gemma Lynch	Series 18; episode 6: "Against Protocol"
2005	Bad Girls	D.I. Kitson	Series 7; episode 1
2013	Dragon Age Inquisition: A World Unveiled	Queen Anora	Television film
2017	Unforgotten	Chambers	Series 2; episodes: 1 & 4
2021	Showtrial	Amanda Wikinson	Series 1; episodes 1–5
2025	Waterloo Road	Lucy Lakes	Series 15; episode 2
2025	Professor T.	Kate Bryant	Series 4; episode 2: "September Gardens"
2025-2026	Cooper and Fry	Sarah Runshaw	5 episodes

=== Podcast series ===
Year	Title	Role	Notes
2020	The Happy Vagina	Herself	
2021	The Capsule in Conversation Podcast	Herself - Guest	Series 4; episode 4
2022	The Divorce Social	Herself - Guest	Series 8; episode 1
2025	When Alan Met Ray	Sylvia	

=== Web series ===
Year	Title	Role	Notes
2011	Dragon Age: Redemption	Queen Anora	Episode 1: "Tallis"

=== Video games ===
Year	Title	Role (voice)	Notes
2009	Dragon Age: Origins	Queen Anora / Isabela / Bella / Dilwyn / other additional voices	Xbox 360
2010	Dragon Age: Origins – Awakening	Queen Anora / Sorcha	PlayStation 3
2014	Dragon Age: Inquisition	Queen Anora / Charter / Seanna	PlayStation 4 / Xbox 360
2015	Dragon Age: Inquisition – Trespasser	Charter	PlayStation 4
2024	Dragon Age: The Veilguard	Queen Anora / Charter	PlayStation 5

== Awards and nominations ==
Year	Award	Category	Nominated Work	Result	Ref.
2019	WorldFest Houston	Best Comedy Short Film	Rain Stops Play	Won	
2019	Underwire Film Festival, UK	Editing Award	Rain Stops Play	Nominated	
2019	Milwaukee Short Film Festival	Festival Prize	Rain Stops Play	Nominated	
2019	That Film Festival	Best of Fest	Rain Stops Play	Nominated	
2019	Portobello Film and Video Festival	Golden Trellick Award	Rain Stops Play	Nominated	
2020	Carmarthen Bay Film Festival, UK	Best Short Comedy	Rain Stops Play	Nominated	
2020	Martha's Vineyard International Film Festival	Jury Prize	Rain Stops Play	Nominated	
2021	Portland Film Festival	Best International Director	Breach	Won	
2022	Santa Barbara International Film Festival	Best Short Film	Breach	Nominated	
2024	Cleveland International Film Festival	Audience Choice Award	My Week with Maisy	Won	
2024	Cleveland International Film Festival	Best Women's Short Film	My Week with Maisy	Won	
2024	Short Shorts Film Festival & Asia	Diversity Award	My Week with Maisy	Nominated	
2024	Crystal Palace International Film Festival	Best Short Film	My Week with Maisy	Nominated	
2024	Brighton Rocks International Film Festival	Best Short Film - Drama	My Week with Maisy	Nominated	
2024	Short Shorts Film Festival & Asia	Best Short Film	My Week with Maisy	Won	
2024	Women Over 50 Film Festival	Best Drama - Commended	My Week with Maisy	Nominated	
2024	Sunderland Shorts Film Festival	Honourable Mention	My Week with Maisy	Honoured	
