= Keir Simmons =

English journalist (born 1972)

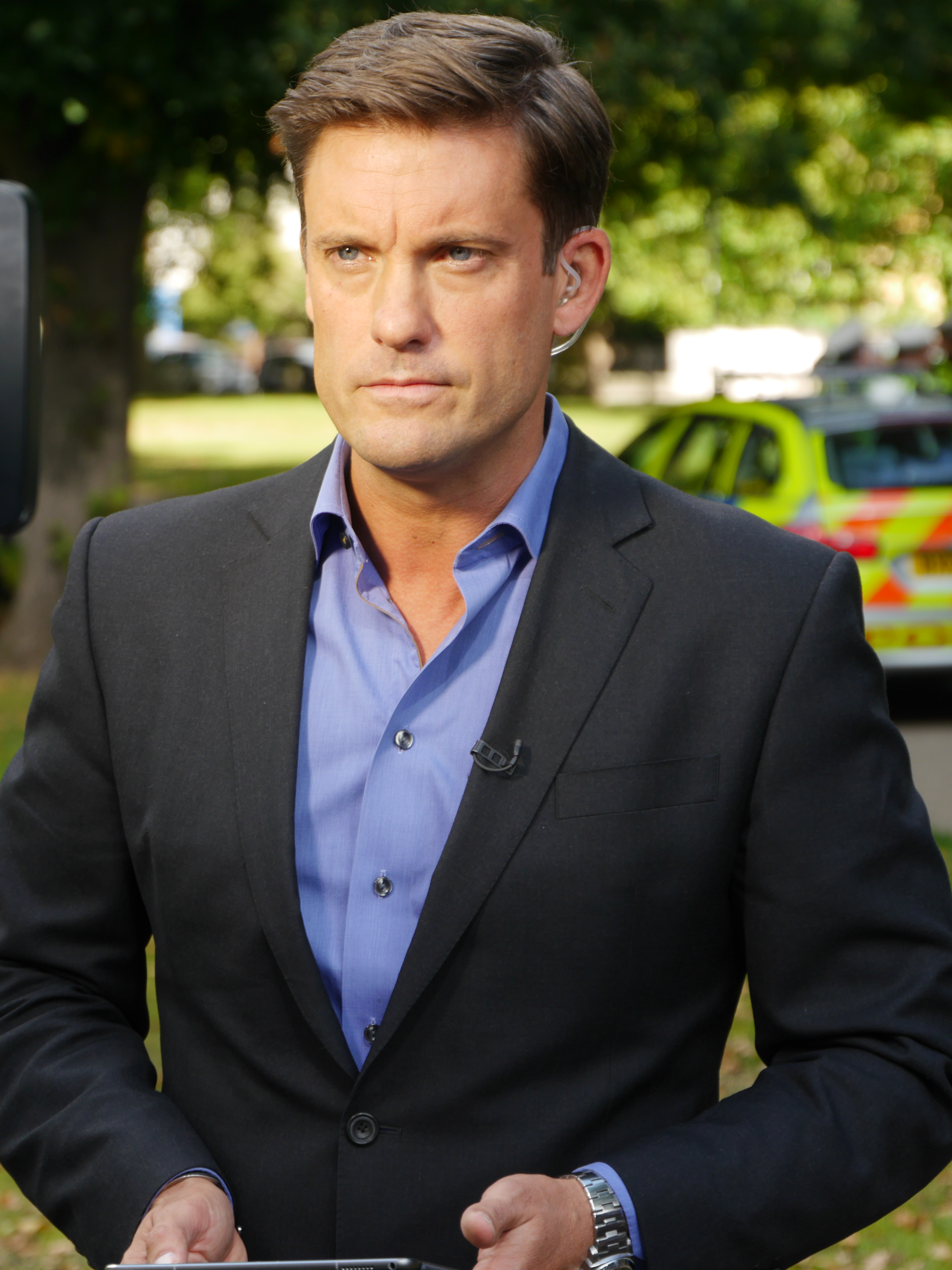
- Simmons reporting from the Parsons Green bombing, 2017
- Born: Keir Hardie Brennan-Simmons; 1972 (age 53–54); Greenwich, London, England
- Education: Goldsmiths, University of London
- Occupation: Journalist
- Spouse: Jessica Binns (m. 2012)
- Children: 2
- Relatives: Mika Simmons (sister)

Keir Hardie Brennan-Simmons (born 1972) is an English journalist. He has been the chief international correspondent for the NBC morning show Today since December 2018. He also appears regularly on the evening broadcast NBC Nightly News, and fills in as an anchor on MSNBC.

From August 2012 until December 2018, Simmons was a foreign correspondent for NBC News. Previously, he was the UK editor for ITN's ITV News.

== Early life and education ==
Simmons was born in London and raised in Bristol. He was educated at Wellsway School, a state comprehensive school in the town of Keynsham in Somerset and St Brendans College, a state Catholic school, followed by Goldsmiths College, a constituent college of the University of London, where he earned a bachelor's degree. His sister is actress and health campaigner Mika Simmons.

== Career ==
Simmons's first job in journalism was as a court reporter covering murders and scandals in London at the Old Bailey. He then moved into radio, joining ITN as a reporter for UK's Independent Radio News (IRN) in 1996, before becoming a general reporter on its ITV News service in 1998.

While at ITV, Simmons reported on major domestic and international stories including the 2004 Indian Ocean earthquake and tsunami, the 2008 Mumbai attacks, the poisoning of Alexander Litvinenko and the Virginia Tech shooting. He was one of the first journalists to cover the 2007 disappearance of Madeleine McCann.

In 2010, Simmons was the first to report that the UK government was paying millions of pounds in compensation to former prisoners of the Guantanamo Bay detention camp. On 30 September 2010, ITV News announced that Simmons would be appointed as the new UK Editor.

In 2011, Simmons led ITV's coverage of the News International phone hacking scandal, breaking stories which included news of the arrest of key figures and the resignation of the Metropolitan Police Commissioner, Sir Paul Stephenson

While working as a reporter for ITV News, Simmons occasionally made on-air appearances on Sky News, 5 News, and ITV London's London Tonight. In September and October 2011, he guest presented on ITV Breakfast programme Daybreak.

On 27 August 2012 Simmons left ITN to join NBC News as a London-based foreign correspondent. He reported for all platforms of NBC News, including Today, Nightly News, MSNBC, and NBCNews.com.

=== NBC News (2012–present) ===
In December 2018, Simmons was named Senior International Correspondent for The Today Show on NBC News. He appears regularly on NBC Nightly News and as a fill-in anchor on MSNBC.

Simmons interviewed Vladimir Putin in person in Moscow on 11 June 2021. He interviewed the Japanese Prime Minister in person in Tokyo in July 2021. He reported on the death of Queen Elizabeth on 8 September 2022.

On 28 February 2023, NBC published a report by Simmons from Sevastopol, Crimea. Simmons said he travelled to Crimea by train from Moscow on the Kerch Bridge. Visiting Crimea from Russia is illegal under Ukrainian law and Ukrainian authorities said they were investigating the circumstances of the illegal visit. In response to the visit, Simmons was added to the Myrotvorets list of 'Enemies of Ukraine'.

== Awards ==
In 2003, Simmons was nominated for a Royal Television Society Award. In 2016, he was nominated for an Emmy Award in the category 'Outstanding Coverage of a Breaking News Story in a News Magazine' for his contribution to a Dateline NBC special 'Terror in Paris'. In 2017, he was nominated for an Emmy Award in the category 'Outstanding Coverage of a Breaking News Story in a News Magazine' for his contribution to a TODAY Show special 'Terror in Brussels'.
