= Lady Garden Foundation =

Charity foundation

- Founded: 2014
- Type: Non-profit
- Purpose: Gynaecological cancer
- Location: United Kingdom
- Products: Lady Garden Campaign
- Website: http://ladygardenfoundation.com

The Lady Garden Foundation, previously the Gynaecological Cancer Fund, was formed in 2014 in the United Kingdom. The foundation was started by a group of women, all of whom had been affected by gynaecological cancer in some capacity.

== History ==
The Lady Garden Foundation was launched in 2014 as the Gynaecological Cancer Fund in order to raise funds and awareness of a number of gynaecological cancers. The charity has created items of clothing, which have appeared in Hello! and Vanity Fair.

Professor Susana Banerjee at The Royal Marsden Hospital is one of the main beneficiaries of the funds raised by the charity. Her work is aimed at targeted treatment for women with gynaecological cancers.

In April 2016, the campaign held its first Lady Garden 5k "fun run", in Battersea Park, London.

The foundation signed an agreement with the retailer Topshop to sell Lady Garden hoodies during Gynaecological Cancer Awareness Month. The charity then partnered with Selfridge's in 2017, and more recently, Stripe & Stare in November 2018.

=== Lady Garden Campaign ===
The Lady Garden Campaign was started by the charity as a social media campaign to raise awareness for numerous cancers and promote screening and funding for the treatment of gynaecological cancers, after research suggested that over a third of women in the United Kingdom were too embarrassed to go to the doctor with gynaecological concerns. It was launched in conjunction with Gynaecological Cancer Awareness Month in September.

The campaign was supported by celebrity endorsements on social media, including from Ellie Goulding, Margot Robbie, Alexa Chung and Rosie Huntington-Whiteley. The campaign reached more than 40 million people on social media within 24 hours.

== Founding committee ==
- Josephine Daniel
- Chloe Delevingne
- Astrid Harbord
- Jenny Halpern Prince
- Mika Simmons
- Tamara Beckwith Veroni

== See also ==
- Cancer in the United Kingdom
