= L Ramachandran =

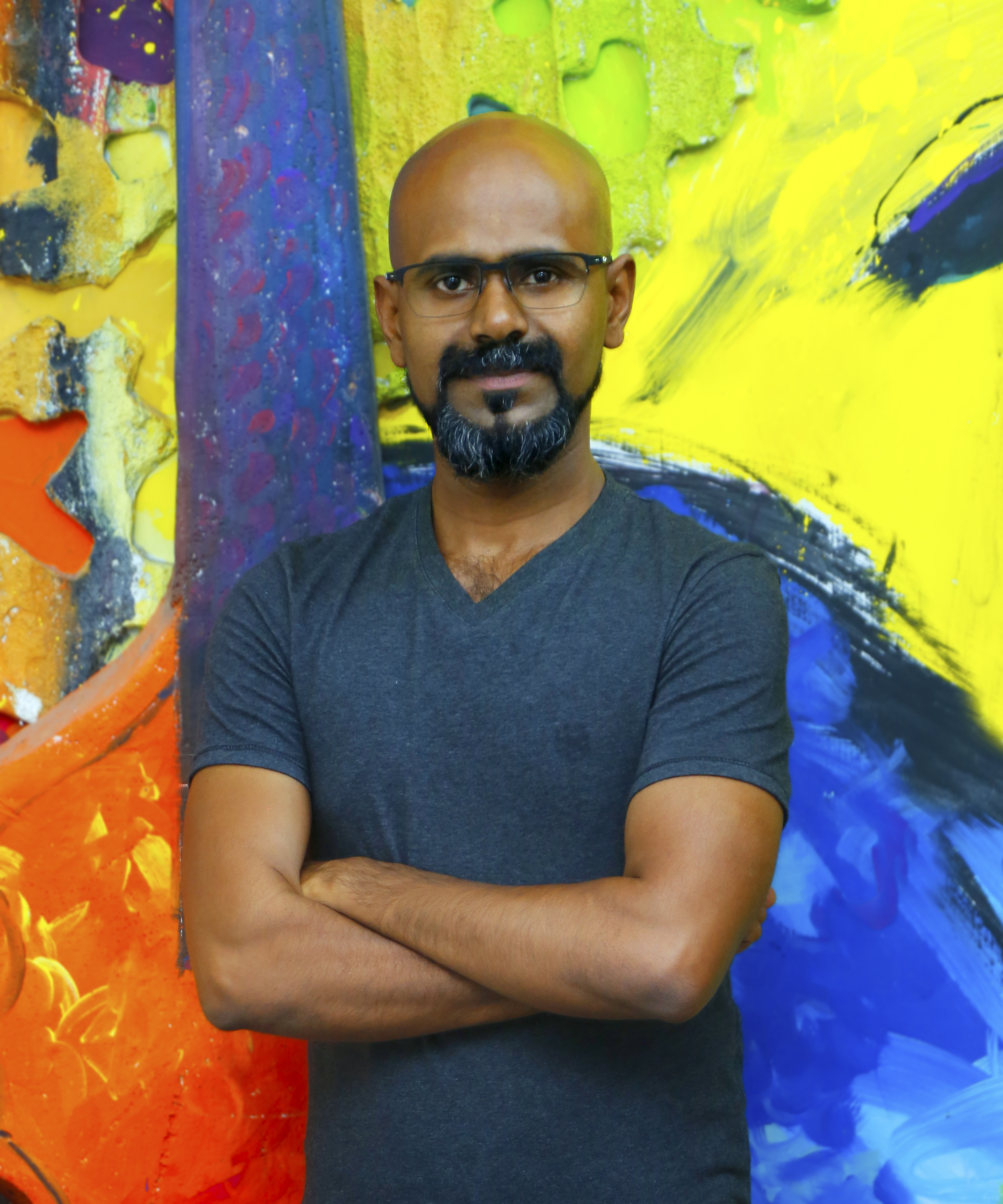
- Born: L Ramachandran; November 11, 1979 (age 46); Valangaiman, Thiruvarur, India
- Occupations: Photographer; Cinematographer
- Known for: Fashion, celebrity, and art photography Cinematography
- Website: lramachandran.com

L. Ramachandran is a distinguished photographer, documentarian, director, authour and cinematographer. Known for his work in fashion photography, fine-art portraiture, and celebrity imagery. His photography has been published in international magazines and has received recognition in several global photography competitions, including the PX3 Prix de la Photographie Paris, the Black & White Spider Awards, and the London Photography Awards. L Ramachandran received an honorable doctorate degree from The International Tamil University USA.. In addition to his photography career, he has worked in visual design for cinema and has authored photography books and conducted large-scale art events, including a Guinness World record.. He has conducted exhibitions in more than 35 countries and has garnered numerous international awards and recognitions for his work.. His storytelling spans diverse genres, including architecture, lifestyle, fashion, celebrity encounters, contemporary art, fine art, and performing arts, bringing real-life narratives to the forefront. Central to his work is his exploration of light to articulate his subjects and themes. L. Ramachandran is dedicated to raising social awareness through his work. He has been a vocal supporter of the transgender community, uniquely capturing the artistry of transgender individuals and helping to elevate their visibility and careers. His campaigns have significantly impacted many transgender professionals, providing them with valuable recognition and opportunities. In addition, L. Ramachandran has worked to preserve and promote the fading culture of folk art by collaborating with folk performers and showcasing their work. His contributions to this cause were acknowledged by the Tamil Nadu Department of Art & Culture. His passion for history and architecture is evident in his extensive documentation of temples across the country. Through his lens, he captures and celebrates the often-overlooked beauty of historical architecture, continually driven by a deep appreciation for the country’s rich heritage.

== Early life ==
L Ramchandran was born on November 11, 1979, in Valangaiman, a small town in the Valangaimantaluk of Thiruvarur district in the Indian state of Tamil Nadu. He joined Fine Arts College of Kumbakonam where he received formal training in painting and visual composition. His early work included banner art and visual design, which provided foundational experience in large-format visual storytelling.

== Career ==
L Ramachandran started his career as an assistant painter and created banners for products and films. He moved to Chennai and got an opportunity to work in the medicine. He found an opportunity to work in a film company to design logos and promotional content. He discovered his interest in photography and started to teach himself the trade. L Ramachandran started his own advertisement agency, Tharansia Private Limited

L Ramachandran did shoots for celebrities and national brands. He attended a seminar in Miami and was selected to participate for Playboy magazine. He met Jarmo Pohjaniemi who was the CEO for Shoot the Centrefold. Jarmo Pohjaniemi got impressed by the photography skills of L Ramachandran and taught him advanced photography. After several rounds, the institute announced L Ramachandran as the first Indian Playboy magazine photographer. After that he worked with many playmates and international photographers. His work was published in Playboy and other magazines. Notable recent work The Artist Photoshoot with Vijay Sethupathi, Human Emotions During Lockdown Photoshoot with Vijay Sethupathi, Street Artist Calendar Photoshoot with Vijay Sethupathi and Man of Fusion Photoshoot.

== Exhibitions ==
| Gallery | Country | Year |
|---|---|---|
| Bangkok Art Fair | Bangkok | 2013 |
| Artapart Fair 5th Edition | Singapore | 2014 |
| Busan International Art Fair | Korea | 2015 |
| Seoul International Art Fair | Korea | 2015 |
| Singapore Bank Art Fair | Singapore | 2015 |
| Gwanngju ‘15 Art Fair | Korea | 2015 |
| Coex Hall 34th Korea Galleries Art Fair | Seoul | 2016 |
| Top 60 Master's Contemporary Art Exhibition | Italy | 2017 |
| L Ramachandran's Art Photography | Croatia | 2017 |
| Melodrama of Melting Mesmerism | India | 2017 |
| Solo Gallery Exhibition- LRC Art Photography | Croatia | 2017 |
| Medley of Art Exhibition | India | 2018 |
| Solo Exhibition Chohyung Gallery | South Korea | 2019 |
| Human Art Festival | South Korea | 2019 |
| Art Gwangju Gallery | South Korea | 2019 |
| Chennai To Madras | India, Chennai | 2020 |

== Books ==
- Chennai To Madras
- Coimbatore - A Journey through Culture and Landscapes
- Echoes of Virudhunagar
- Khaki Mounts - The Greater Chennai Mounted Police
- Gopuram: Gateways to Heaven
- Home of Chess
- Medley of Art
- Queen of Fantasy
- Apsaras
- Ethereal of light
- Choreographing the Chiaroscuro
- CM Trophy 2023
- Khelo India Youth Games 2024
- CM Trophy 2024
- CM Trophy 2025
- WTA 250 - Chennai Open

== Awards ==
- IPA – International photography award – 2011 Los Angeles
- Photographer's forum magazine – 2011 United States
- STC best student award – 2012 United States
- STC best student award – 2013 Santorini
- TEA award – 2013 India
- STC beat lighting (Hensel) – 2014 Miami
- HP award – 2016
- B&W spider award – 2016
- ATIM's Top 60 Masters’ contemporary artist award – 2017
- B&W Spider Award – 2017
- PX3 Award – 2017
- TIFA Award – 2017 Silver winner
- Honourable Doctorate from International Tamil University – 2018
- Honourable Doctorate from St.Andrews Theological University – 2019
- Behind the Success of Transgender Special Award - 2019
- London Photography Awards (Poetry in Motions - People Photography) - 2022

== Documentaries ==
- Land of Festivals
- Tamil Nadu - Department of Archaeology
- Tamil Nadu - Department of Handlooms & Textiles
- Tamil Nadu - HR & CE
- Coimbatore - A Journey through Culture & Landscapes
- Sports Documentaries for Sports Development Authority of Tamil Nadu

== Movie Posters ==
- Gandhi Talks
- Garudan
- Maaman
- Iravin Nizhal
- Teenz
- Marakuma Nenjam
- Enni Thuniga
