= Jazzy de Lisser =

English actress

- Born: Jasmine Francesca C. de Lisser; 3 August 1991 (age 35); Westminster, London, England
- Occupations: Actress; model; fashion designer; socialite
- Years active: 2007–present

Jasmine Francesca C. de Lisser (born 3 August 1991) is an English actress, model, fashion designer and socialite. As a teenager, she made an award-winning-film about her life with Hepatitis C. She made her feature film debut in to.get.her (2011).

Through her mother, she is a descendant of the Lee family of Virginia.

== Early life and education ==
De Lisser was born in central London and grew up between London and Jamaica, where her father Robert de Lisser was born. Her mother is fashion designer Serena Bute, and her stepfather was the late Grand Prix competitor Johnny Dumfries.

De Lisser was born with the chronic liver disease Hepatitis C. This was passed on from her mother, who had possibly become infected through intravenous drug use. When de Lisser was six, the family moved from Jamaica to London, and she started taking Interferon.

At 13, de Lisser went to Bryanston School, and left after completing her GCSEs to take her A Levels at the Fine Arts College in Hampstead, enabling her to attend medical appointments in London. De Lisser trained at the William Esper Studio and the T. Schreiber Theater and Acting Studio in New York.

== Career ==
=== Campaigning ===
As a teenager, de Lisser made an award-winning short film, called My Story of C, about her experience of living with Hepatitis C. The film begins in October 2007, when she was 15. De Lisser started being treated by Prof. Giorgina Mieli-Vergani, an expert in the disease, at King's College Hospital. Prof. Mieli-Vergani estimated the chances of success at 40%, and treatment ultimately proved unsuccessful.

The film won a shorts competition organised by the Media Trust for works by 15 to 19-year-olds. De Lisser worked with the British Liver Trust to build an educational website, then raised funds to pay for Academy Award winning studio Passion Pictures to produce a short animated education film, Liver Good Life.

De Lisser later participated in the World Health Organization World Hepatitis Summit 2015, as a patient representative. In 2015, de Lisser took part in the Lady Garden Campaign for the Gynaecological Cancer Fund, posing in a "Lady Garden" sweater. The campaign's aim was to raise awareness about gynaecological cancers.

De Lisser was one of the members of the Skinny Bitch Collective, an invitation-only workout group that was criticised for its sexualisation of women working out, and for being exploitative and degrading.

=== Acting ===
In 2011, de Lisser made her feature film debut in the thriller to.get.her as one of a group of five girls who spend a night together. The film won the Best of NEXT!: Audience Award at the Sundance Film Festival. This was followed by de Lisser's television debut in 2014 with a minor role in the fourth season of the HBO fantasy series Game of Thrones as Tansy, a servant chased and killed by Ramsay Bolton's dogs.

De Lisser returned to acting in 2017, playing Gina Anderson in the film Thumper and Tatiana Romanova in the short film The Last Birthday. This was followed by roles in the films Abigail Falls as the titular character, for which she was nominated for Best Lead Actress at the Madrid International Film Festival in 2018, First Person: A Film About Love and Hurt by Paradise in 2019, and Project Power on Netflix in 2020. In 2022, de Lisser appeared in the Peacock series Vampire Academy as Sasha Tanner and the Swedish historical film Hilma.

== Filmography ==
=== Film ===
Year	Title	Role	Notes
2009	My Story with C		Short film; writer
2011	to.get.her	Ana Frost	
2012	Random Acts of Violence	Victim	
2017	Thumper	Gina Anderson	
2017	The Last Birthday	Tatiana Romanova	Short film
2018	Abigail Falls	Abigail	
2019	First Person: A Film About Love	Catherine	
2019	Hurt by Paradise	Lori	
2020	Project Power	Candy / Frozen Woman	Netflix film
2022	Hilma	Thomasine	

=== Television ===
Year	Title	Role	Notes
2014	Game of Thrones	Tansy	Episode: "The Lion and the Rose"
2022	Vampire Academy	Sasha Tanner	3 episodes
2023	Top Boy	Antonia	2 episodes

== Awards and nominations ==
Year	Award	Category	Work	Result	Ref.
2018	Madrid International Film Festival	Best Lead Actress	Abigail Falls	Nominated	
