= Ian Holloway =

English football player and manager (born 1963)

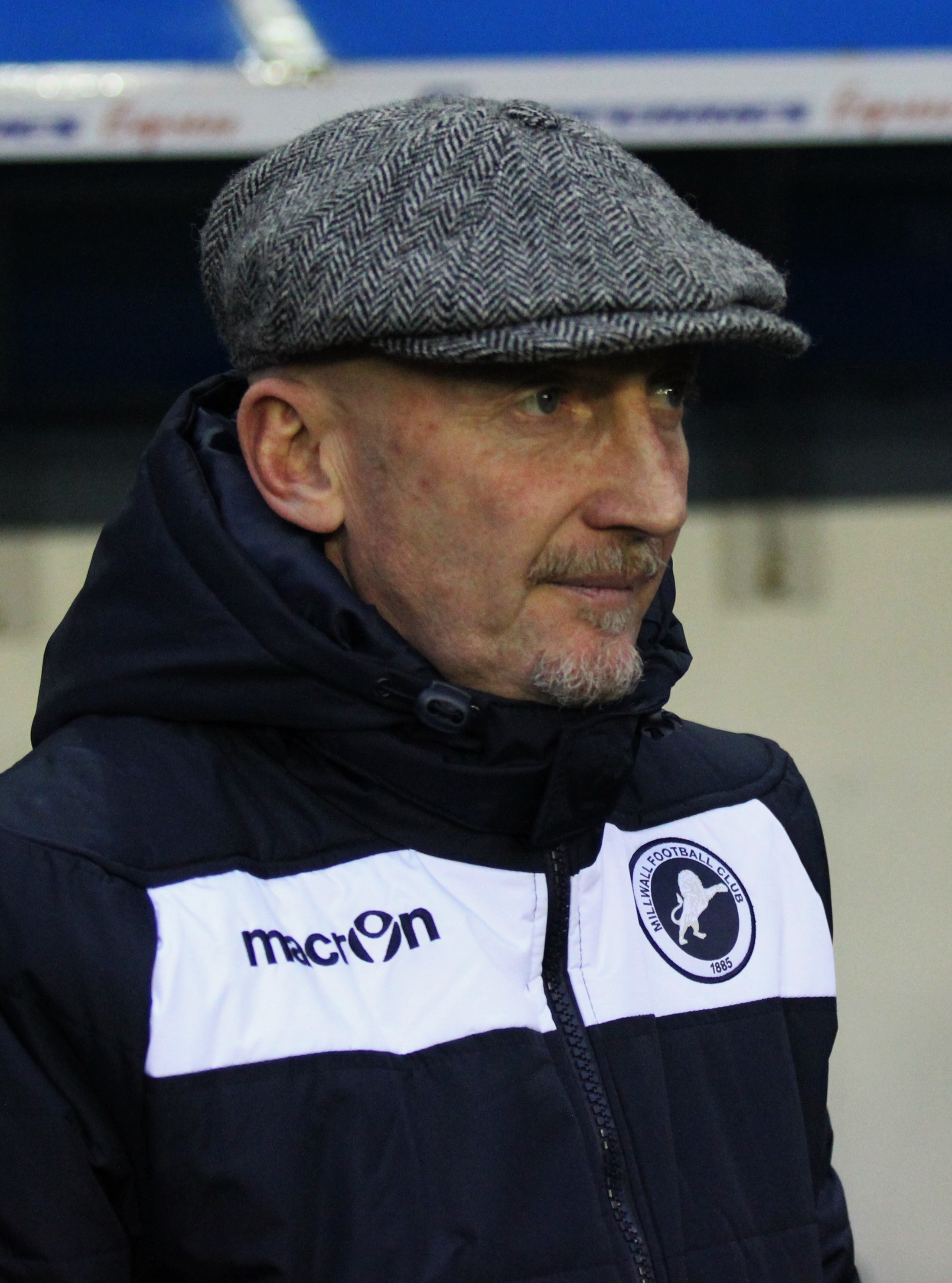
- Holloway in 2015

Personal information
- Full name: Ian Scott Holloway
- Date of birth: 12 March 1963 (age 63)
- Place of birth: Kingswood, Gloucestershire, England
- Height: 5 ft 8 in (1.73 m)
- Position: Midfielder

Team information
- Current team: Swindon Town (manager)

Youth career
- Bristol Rovers

Senior career*
Years	Team	Apps	(Gls)
1980–1985	Bristol Rovers	111	(15)
1985–1986	Wimbledon	19	(2)
1986–1987	Brentford	29	(2)
1987	→ Torquay United (loan)	5	(0)
1987–1991	Bristol Rovers	179	(26)
1991–1996	Queens Park Rangers	147	(4)
1996–1999	Bristol Rovers	107	(1)
Total		597	(50)

Managerial career
- 1996–2001: Bristol Rovers
- 2001–2006: Queens Park Rangers
- 2006–2007: Plymouth Argyle
- 2007–2008: Leicester City
- 2009–2012: Blackpool
- 2012–2013: Crystal Palace
- 2014–2015: Millwall
- 2016–2018: Queens Park Rangers
- 2019–2020: Grimsby Town
- 2024–: Swindon Town
- * Club domestic league appearances and goals

Ian Scott Holloway (born 12 March 1963) is an English professional football manager and former player who is currently the manager of EFL League Two club Swindon Town.

A midfielder, he notably played in the Premier League with Queens Park Rangers, where he made just under 150 league appearances in a five-year spell. He spent most of his career at boyhood club Bristol Rovers, where he had three spells, which included the start and finish of his playing career. He was part of the Wimbledon team that won promotion to the top flight in 1986, a place they would retain for the next fourteen seasons. He also played in the Football League with Brentford and Torquay United.

During his third spell back at Bristol Rovers, he became player-manager before ending his playing career in 1999. He has also managed Queens Park Rangers (where he won promotion from Division Two in 2003–04), Plymouth Argyle, Leicester City, Blackpool, Crystal Palace and Millwall. As he did with Blackpool three years earlier, Holloway managed Crystal Palace to promotion to the Premier League in May 2013, but after the club had won only one of their opening eight games he left, by mutual consent, on 23 October 2013 after less than a year in charge. On 6 January 2014, Holloway signed a two-and-a-half-year deal with Millwall; this was terminated in March 2015. He rejoined Queens Park Rangers as manager on 11 November 2016. In December 2019, he joined Grimsby Town as a manager and club director after committing to purchase shares in the club. He resigned just under a year later.

He is known by the nickname "Ollie", which is also the title of his autobiography. Holloway has a reputation amongst football fans for his West Country accent, off-the-wall interviews and amusing answers to questions from the media, with a wide selection of quotes and soundbites being printed.

== Playing career ==
A native of Kingswood, Gloucestershire, near Bristol, Holloway grew up in Cadbury Heath, where his mother, Jean, lived in the same council house until her death in April 2018. Holloway went to Sir Bernard Lovell School in Oldland Common at the same time that Gary Penrice was at Chase School for Boys in Mangotsfield. They still remain close friends today. His father Bill – an amateur footballer – worked as a seaman and a factory worker.

Holloway began his playing career as an apprentice with his hometown team Bristol Rovers, turning professional in March 1981 and making his league debut the same year. He usually played on the right side of midfield, and made his name as one of the more promising players in the Third Division (now League One). After four seasons at Rovers, he was transferred to Wimbledon in July 1985 for £35,000.

Holloway's stay at Wimbledon was a short one. In March 1986, after less than one year at the club, he was sold to Brentford for £25,000, where he also spent just a little over a year. In January 1987 he joined Torquay United on loan, playing five times. In August 1987, after two years in London, Holloway returned to Bristol Rovers for a fee of £10,000.

Back at Rovers, who were now playing "home" games at Twerton Park in Bath, and under the wing of new Rovers manager Gerry Francis, Holloway flourished. In four seasons, he missed only five games. When Francis was appointed manager of First Division side QPR in 1991, one of his first signings was Holloway, for a fee of £230,000 in August 1991. Holloway spent five seasons at QPR, playing more than 150 games for the club, before returning to Bristol Rovers for the third time in August 1996, this time as player-manager.

== Managerial career ==
=== Bristol Rovers ===
Holloway took over a club that was struggling both on and off the pitch. In his first season in charge of Rovers, he led the club to 17th place in Division Two (now League One). The next season, however, Bristol Rovers gained fifth place and made the playoffs. Despite taking a first-leg advantage of 3–1 against Northampton Town, Rovers subsequently lost 3–0 in the second leg and went out 4–3 on aggregate in the semi-finals. The 1998–99 season ended with a somewhat disappointing 13th place. Holloway retired as a player following that season, having played more than 400 matches for Bristol Rovers, to concentrate fully on management. In 1999–2000, his last full season at the club, Rovers finished 7th, narrowly missing out on the play-offs.

=== Queens Park Rangers ===
In February 2001, midway through the 2000–01 season, Holloway was appointed manager of QPR, where he was given the task of keeping the team in Division One. He failed to do so, as QPR finished second from bottom and were relegated to the third level for the first time in 34 years. Despite the relegation, Holloway stayed on and rebuilt the side. After steadying the ship in 2001–02, and a near miss in 2002–03, Holloway and QPR were promoted back to the second level in 2004, finishing second behind Plymouth Argyle.

Holloway's first full season in The Championship ended with a respectable 11th place, and during the following season 2005–06, the club continued to hover around mid-table.

Holloway was suspended (sent on gardening leave) as manager by Queens Park Rangers on 6 February 2006. The reason given by the QPR board was that the constant rumours linking Holloway to the vacant managerial position at Leicester City were causing too many problems for the club. As it turned out, the Leicester job went to Rob Kelly, and QPR went on to finish 21st, just one place above the relegation positions.

=== Plymouth Argyle ===
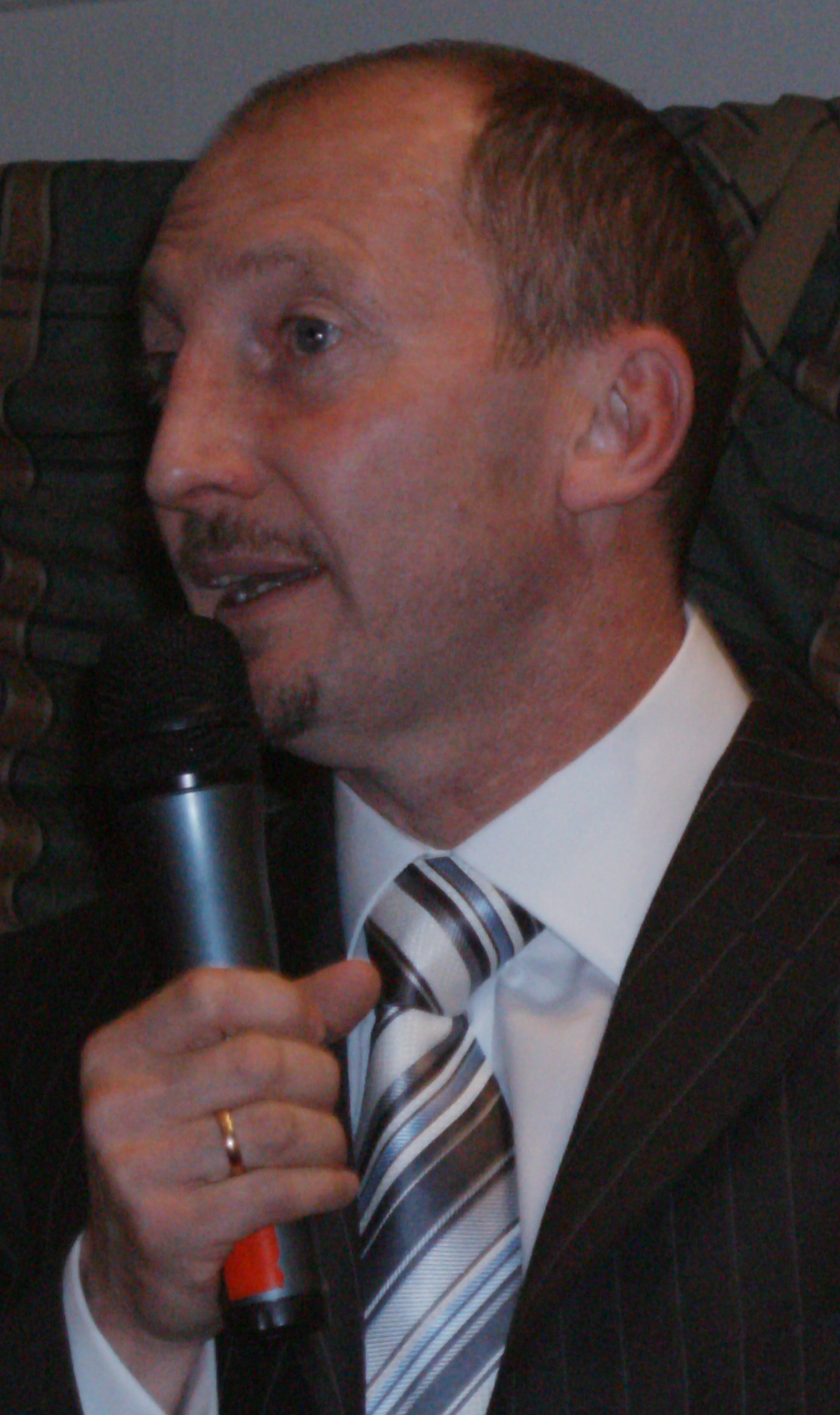
Holloway in 2007

On 28 June 2006, Holloway became the manager of Plymouth Argyle, and promised to take the club to the Premier League. On 12 August, after Plymouth beat Sunderland away 2–3, in celebration of his first away win as manager, Holloway offered to buy every one of the 700 fans who made the 805-mile (1,296 km) round trip a drink.

Following press speculation, on 21 November 2007, Holloway submitted his resignation to the Plymouth Argyle board, with speculation that he was about to be offered the vacant managerial position at Leicester City. The Plymouth board issued a statement saying he was still employed by Plymouth and tied legally to his contract, and the board's decision on whether or not to accept his resignation would be made on Friday, 23 November. Having agreed a compensation package for his services, he was announced in a press conference by Milan Mandarić as Leicester manager on 22 November, signing a 3 1/2-year contract. His departure, however, was met with negativity from Argyle fans.

After an open top bus tour in Blackpool, after his Blackpool side won promotion to the Premier League some three years later, Holloway said:

I had a year out of football and had to think about what went wrong in my life. I was given some decent values from my mum and dad in our council house, and one of them was honesty and trust and loyalty. And I forgot to do all that at Plymouth. I left them, and I made the biggest mistake of my life.

=== Leicester City ===
Holloway made history when he became the first Leicester manager in over 50 years to win his first league game in charge, beating Bristol City 2–0.

On 7 February 2008, in a buildup to a match against Plymouth at the Walkers Stadium, Argyle chairman Paul Stapleton spoke negatively of Holloway for allowing several high-profile players to leave the club before joining Leicester. A total of five players left Plymouth in the January transfer window, which he claimed was all Holloway's fault. Holloway, stunned by the claims, had his lawyers look at the statements, while Mandarić accused Stapleton of "sour grapes" over Holloway's move to Leicester, saying Plymouth Argyle should be thankful for what he had achieved during his time there. Plymouth won the match 1–0 as Holloway's former charges came back to haunt him. Winning just nine out of 32 games, Leicester were relegated from the Championship on 4 May 2008 entering the third tier of English football for the first time in their history.

On 23 May 2008, following the club's relegation, Holloway and Leicester City parted company by mutual consent. Reflecting on his time at Leicester, he said "Leicester City is a marvellous club and I am as devastated as anybody that this great club suffered relegation. I gave 100% to the cause but unfortunately we ran out of time. The fans here are a different class and deserve a lot, lot better. I'd like to wish everyone connected with Leicester City well for the future – the club will always remain close to my heart."

=== Blackpool ===
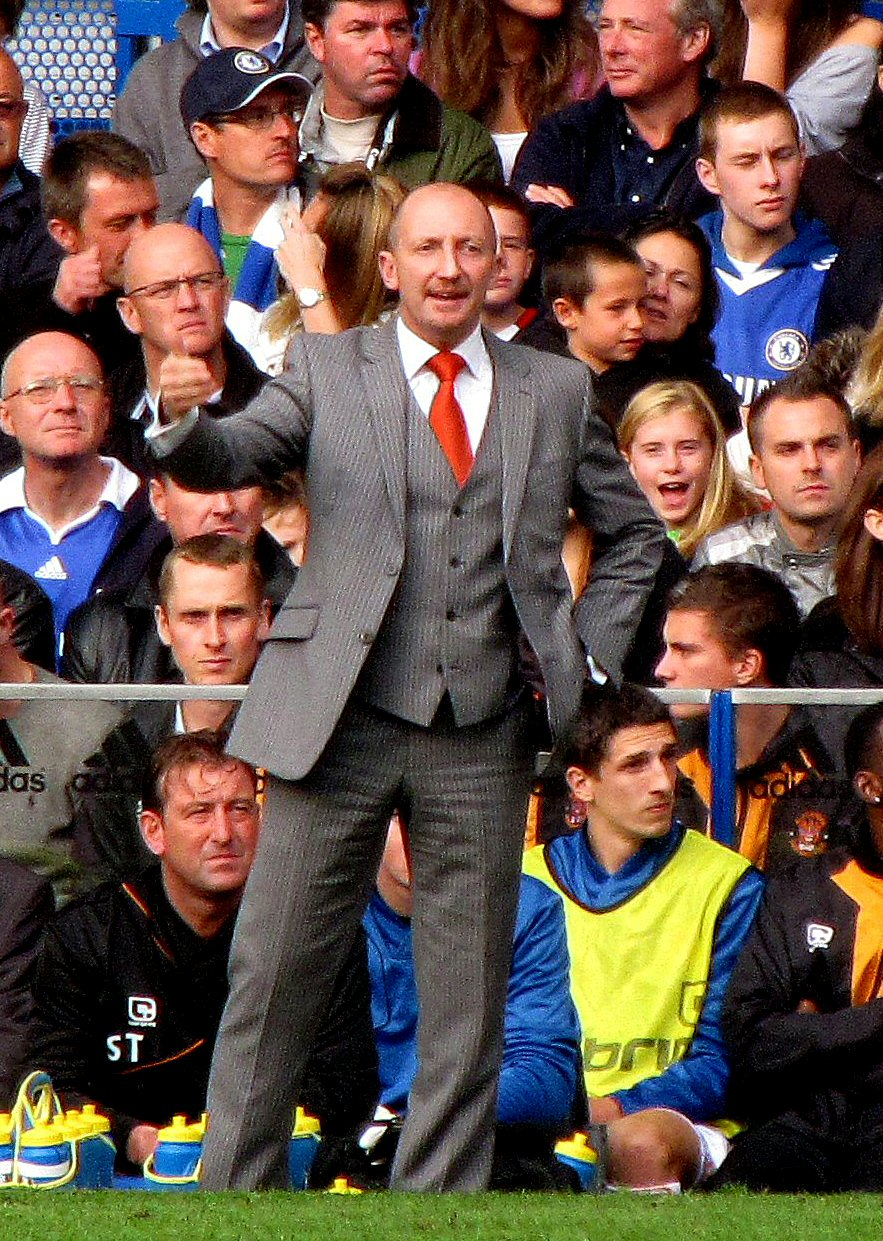
Holloway as Blackpool manager in 2010

On 21 May 2009, it was reported that Holloway, after 364 days out of football, was set to be announced as the new manager of Blackpool following the departure of their caretaker manager Tony Parkes. The appointment was confirmed later the same day with Holloway signing a one-year contract with the club. His first league game in charge of the Seasiders was a 1–1 draw with his former club Queens Park Rangers at Loftus Road on 8 August 2009, the opening day of the 2009–10 season. Nine months later, he guided the club to the Premier League after winning the play-offs following a sixth-placed finish in The Championship, becoming only the second Blackpool manager (after Les Shannon in 1970) to win promotion in his first full season. Holloway described the achievement as the best moment of his life, aside from seeing his children born. Holloway followed this up in late July by leading Blackpool to victory in the South West Challenge Cup annual pre-season tournament. It was the first time a Premier League club had taken part.

Before the start of Blackpool's first top-flight season in 40 years, media reports suggested that Holloway was set to resign as manager following an alleged dispute with club chairman Karl Oyston. However, at a press conference held at Bloomfield Road on 11 August to announce the arrival of four new players, Holloway swiftly denied the rumours, describing his relationship with Oyston as "absolutely fantastic". And adding:

Apparently yesterday [Tuesday] I had resigned. It's just a crazy world that we have moved into. Before anyone asks a question, I just want to make sure you can see me – you can see me here and I'm not a cardboard cut-out, because somehow or other, I'm not supposed to be here. I had to be in London the day before and didn't want to drive back at six o'clock in the morning to get here because I was too tired. I had to be at a Premier League meeting, and [look] what that has caused by not coming back up for training. We only had eight players, some were on international duty and I wasn't going to train them that hard anyway. Look at how things go crazy. But welcome, and by the way, we've just signed some new players as well. I just want to get that straight.

The following day it was reported that Holloway had signed a new two-year contract.

On 27 January 2011, the Premier League fined Blackpool £25,000 for fielding what they believed to be a weakened team against Aston Villa on 10 November 2010. Holloway, who initially threatened to resign if punishment was dealt, made ten changes to the team for the fixture. Holloway was made aware of the fine over the phone while playing golf with his wife at Shawhill Golf Club in Chorley. He offered his resignation to Karl Oyston, but it was rejected.

On 22 May 2011, Blackpool lost their Premier League status after losing 4–2 to champions Manchester United at Old Trafford, coupled with results elsewhere, and returned to The Championship after one season.

Holloway marked his century of games in charge of Blackpool with a victory, the 37th of his reign, over Ipswich Town at Bloomfield Road on 10 September 2011.

In May 2012, Holloway guided Blackpool into The Championship play-offs for the second time in as many seasons in the division. They lost 2–1 to West Ham in the play-off final.

Holloway's win percentage in League games as Blackpool manager was 37.8% (54 wins from 143 games).

=== Crystal Palace ===
On 3 November 2012, Holloway agreed to join Crystal Palace as manager, although caretaker manager Curtis Fleming remained in charge of the team for the match on that day. He took charge of his first game on 6 November, which Crystal Palace won 5–0 against Ipswich Town. On 27 May 2013, Holloway guided Crystal Palace to promotion to the 2013–14 Premier League after beating Watford 1–0 through a penalty converted by Kevin Phillips in extra time.

In the 2013–14 Premier League season, Crystal Palace started with just three points from the first eight games as Holloway came under pressure to keep his job.

On 23 October 2013, after a 4–1 loss against Fulham, Holloway left the club by mutual consent after less than a year in charge.

=== Millwall ===
On 7 January 2014, he signed a two-and-a-half-year contract with Millwall. He then guided the club to Championship safety for the 2013–14 season as Millwall finished 19th, four points above the relegation places. In the 2014–15 season, as Millwall dropped in the relegation places in The Championship, Holloway admitted that he had become an unpopular manager among Millwall fans. On 10 March 2015, following a 4–1 defeat at home to Norwich City, Holloway was dismissed for the first time in his managerial career, with the team second from bottom in the Championship and having lost five of their last six games.

=== Return to Queens Park Rangers ===
On 11 November 2016, Holloway was appointed as manager of Queens Park Rangers on a two-and-a-half-year deal. He arrived at a team who were in 17th place after the dismissal of Jimmy Floyd Hasselbaink. His team avoided relegation on the penultimate day of the season with a 2–0 home win over Nottingham Forest.

Holloway left QPR on 10 May 2018, amid speculation that Steve McClaren was being lined up to succeed him. He had finished 16th in the recently concluded season, and was congratulated by chief executive Lee Hoos for achieving results while the club was cutting costs.

=== Grimsby Town ===
On 29 December 2019, Holloway joined Grimsby Town as manager. At the same time he became committed to becoming a shareholder in the club and confirmed he would be purchasing £100,000 of shares, thereby allowing him to attend board meetings in addition to his duties as club manager. Holloway was appointed as a director in the process. The Mariners won their first two games under him with a 1–0 win at home to Salford City followed by a 1–0 win away at Mansfield Town the following week. Holloway made a host of signings that included his former Blackpool players Billy Clarke and Elliot Grandin. On 7 March 2020 the side played out their final game of the season with a 2–0 win away at local rivals Scunthorpe United before the season was cut short and ended early due to the COVID-19 pandemic.

In February 2020, majority shareholder John Fenty announced he was going to be taking a step back and allowing Holloway more freedom and autonomy to run the club both on and off the field. Holloway made wholesale changes to the Grimsby side over the summer which included seven loan signings, despite only having the ability to name five in a match day squad. On 22 November 2020, following a 5–0 defeat against Tranmere Rovers, Holloway announced he had released one of his recent signings Bilel Mohsni despite recently stating "he is my leader, he is my Virgil van Dijk". Mohsni despite not playing in the 5–0 defeat was confirmed released as he did not meet Holloway's standards, this prompted Mohsni to set up a Twitter account and post a video to announce that he had not left the club, was still contracted, feeling fit and would be at training the next day. The following day, Holloway said that he thought the termination had been agreed and that it was not his concern whether the player remained at the club until January. Mohsni signed for Barnet on 1 December 2020.

On 17 December 2020, it was discovered by the Grimsby Telegraph that John Fenty had entertained Manchester-based convicted fraudster Alex May at a Grimsby Town game, with May looking to invest £1 million into the club. However, with the news of his offer on the table it was met with strong resistance by fans leading to the deal to be turned down by the club. Unrelated to the May offer, but during the same week the club had also confirmed it had met with a consortium of local businessmen fronted by London-based Tom Shutes about a potential takeover. Holloway hit out at the consortium by saying that he was finding it increasingly hard to do his job. He also announced he was backing away from his director duties to concentrate on his position as manager and would be using social media more often to communicate with supporters, claiming also that he would not be going anywhere unless told so.

It was also announced that Holloway had not yet invested any money into the club like first thought, and that this investment would now only be made upon the sale of his house in Bristol. Following Grimsby's 1–0 victory over Scunthorpe on 19 December 2020 he stated that he would not be going ahead with plans to invest any of his money in the club due to the on-going discussions in the boardroom and continuing talks of a takeover.

On the morning of 23 December 2020, just hours after Grimsby's 1–2 home defeat to Bradford City, Holloway resigned as manager. He had been in charge just under a year, leaving them 20th in League Two with only five wins from nineteen games. His reason for departing was his displeasure at Fenty's decision to sell his shares in the club, claiming he did not want to carry on at the club without the people he came here to work with. Holloway also stated that a key factor in his departure was that the potential consortium interested in buying the club had reached out to him and contacted him several times and he found this to be inappropriate; although a statement later released by the potential investment group denied that any of them had ever had any contact with Holloway and stated "Several weeks ago, we did make it clear through a mutual friend that we were very supportive of Ian and that if we were to take over as custodians of the club we wanted to build a legacy with him in place (which we also communicated to Philip Day in our discussions over the last week)." The group also expressed surprise and disappointment at his resignation. Later that day Fenty officially rejected a potential takeover over bid from the consortium, although terms were finally agreed on 29 December 2020 to sell the club to Jason Stockwood and Andrew Pettit, members of the Shutes consortium.

Grimsby replaced Holloway temporarily with his assistant Ben Davies who following the club's next game, commented "I had a good chat with him, and everything was okay. We went into the game against Bradford on Tuesday night, and he came in the next morning and said he'd resigned. Obviously it's hard to take when you get close to someone over the last year or so, but that's the way it goes."

After his resignation, Holloway drew criticism in both the nature of his departure and the state and quality of the team that he had put together during the summer, with the squad he left behind bloated in numbers and lacking in quality. Holloway later stated that he had left the club in a better position than when he arrived, despite the club being embroiled in a relegation battle with a squad that seemed destined for relegation.

On 12 January 2021, Grimsby Town became the first football club in England to be fined for breaking COVID-19 protocol after an EFL investigation revealed that the club had broken several social distancing rules, including Holloway having played darts with some of his players at the club's training ground.

On 27 April 2021, Grimsby were relegated back to non-League for a second time. Former Mariners player and BBC Humberside co-commentator Gary Croft blamed Holloway for using the club as "a bit of a play thing", and reflected that "I just can't believe that people have stood around and watched it happen, watched it unfurl without getting into him, questioning him, and finding out what's going on".

=== Unemployed years ===
Following his initial departure from Grimsby, Holloway went on to state that he was unsure whether he would return to football management again, saying his appetite for football had diminished.

In a podcast interview in late 2022, Holloway blamed his Grimsby departure on the COVID-19 pandemic and the fact that his scouting network was not suited to operate at League Two level. He also stated he would be interested in a return to management, but only at EFL Championship level.

In February 2023, Holloway applied for and was interviewed for the vacancy at Scottish Premiership side Motherwell, although the board eventually chose Stuart Kettlewell.

=== Swindon Town ===
On 25 October 2024, nearly four years since he left his last role, Holloway was appointed as manager of EFL League Two club Swindon Town, taking over with the club in 22nd place. Following Swindon's poor form, Holloway quipped that he believed Swindon's training ground was haunted.

On 14 December 2024, following a 1–0 defeat to Bradford City, Holloway had to be restrained by his players after an altercation with a Swindon supporter. Holloway, who had won only one of his opening seven games, angrily addressed the fan in a post-match interview and suggested that the supporter should not travel to away games anymore. On 21 December, Holloway defeated former club Grimsby Town in his 1000th managerial game, but again criticised supporters after the game who held a protest against the board, stating that it only represented a minority of fans. He also stated: "If you don't like me or the club or what we are doing then don't come, I believe that I will get thousands who will come."

Swindon's form continued into 2025, with thirteen points from six matches seeing Holloway named EFL League Two Manager of the Month for January 2025.

In February 2025, Holloway was charged with misconduct by the EFL for abusive language towards a match official in the fixture against Chesterfield on 22 February. Holloway had been sent from the touchline.

On 28 March 2025, having earned 36 points from 24 matches, Holloway was rewarded with a new long-term contract to keep him with the club until June 2028.

== Personal life ==
Holloway met fellow Bristolian Kim when they were both aged 15, and after marrying, he nursed her through lymphatic cancer. The couple have four children. Two of his three daughters are twins and were born profoundly deaf, as both Ian and Kim had a recessive form of a certain gene meaning that there was a higher chance that they would have deaf children. The doctors told them that there was only a remote possibility of any other children being deaf, but a third daughter was also born deaf. Discussing his children in 2010, Holloway said: "It's been a fight all the way along to get proper provision for the girls, especially a good education. There's been rows, tribunals, appeals and endless phone calls. We have been labelled as bolshie parents. My view is that every child in the world has the right to be educated properly and whether your eyes or ears don't work is irrelevant. But the system at the moment makes it difficult."

For the last three years of his QPR career, Holloway commuted daily from Bristol to London, a 250-mile round trip, so the children could attend a deaf school in Bristol. As a result, he developed severe sciatica. The family then moved to St Albans when the children were of secondary school age, for the same reason. Holloway has learned sign language, and his quirky media-friendly quotes have made him a high-profile campaigner on deaf issues and concerns.

Holloway on his children:

We still feel that we're lucky. Yes, our children have a severe disability, but it's an invisible disability and in every other way, they're perfect, and so we're thankful for that. To experience the sheer trust and love of a deaf child is amazing. The girls' deafness has touched and enhanced our lives. We're better people because of it.

During the gap between leaving Leicester and his appointment as Blackpool manager, Holloway became involved with the self-sufficiency movement, acquiring a brood of chickens and learning sufficient carpentry to build what he described as "Orpington Manor". When he moved north after taking over at Blackpool, the family brought with them their 33 chickens, three horses, two dogs and two ducks. After they settled into their home near Pendle Hill, Blackpool's groundsman, Stan Raby, gave them seven turkeys.

On 20 October 2020, during a post-match interview, Holloway said that the day had been "one of the worst days of my life". He said that he had learnt of the suicide of one of his best friends earlier in the day.

"One of my best mates killed himself, and it really just puts all of this nonsense in its place to be honest. I feel for his family, I feel for his wife and his children. It's just absolutely soul destroying. If you looked at him, you'd never think he'd do anything like that."

Members of The Fishy, a Grimsby Town fan forum, started a fundraiser to raise money in support of Holloway, in a show of loyal support for him. The fundraiser had donations from across the world, as well as many donations from supporters of clubs that he had previously managed. The final total raised was £6,686.85, of which Holloway donated it to two charities suggested by the family of his friend.

In May 2025, Holloway had skin cancer removed from his face, leaving him with visible scarring. Based on his experiences, Swindon launched a training kit with a logo that changed colour when ultraviolet levels were too high.

== Media career ==
Holloway is well known for his comments in post-match interviews, which are often quoted in the national media. His creative use of metaphors has made him one of the most popular interviewees and one of the cult personalities in English football. In June 2005 a book of his quotes, Let's Have Coffee: The Tao of Ian Holloway, was published; in June 2006, he came 15th in a Time Out poll of funniest Londoners.

His autobiography, Ollie: The Autobiography of Ian Holloway, co-written with David Clayton, was first published in 2007, with an update in 2009. In August 2008, the Little Book of Ollie'isms was published, also co-written with David Clayton. Holloway also wrote the foreword for The Official Bristol Rovers Quiz Book, published in November 2008.

Holloway is an Honorary Patron of the anti-racist organisation Show Racism the Red Card. He attended an educational event at Bloomfield Road in 2009 along with then Blackpool club captain Jason Euell, who had recently been the victim of racist abuse. The pair attended the event and sat on a panel to share their opinions and experiences of racism with the audience of young people.

For the 2010–11 season, Holloway agreed to write a weekly column for The Independent on Sunday. For the 2012–13 campaign, he wrote for the Sunday Mirror.

During breaks in his managerial career, Holloway has often appeared as a television pundit on EFL on Quest with Colin Murray. In 2019 he also began his own podcast named The Ian Holloway Podcast. The podcast was put on hold whilst he spent time as the manager of Grimsby Town but following his departure he announced he was resuming his show and asked for questions to feature on his next broadcast by posting on his Twitter account. The post went viral when supporters of Grimsby Town began sarcastically asking him darts related questions in reference to his game of darts at the training field that caused the club to be fined by the EFL for breaking COVID-19 protocol; other fans also voiced their displeasure at the nature of his departure from the club and the lack of quality in the team he left behind.

== Managerial statistics ==
As of match played 21 November 2026

Managerial record by team and tenure
Team	From	To	Record					Ref.
Team	From	To	P	W	D	L	Win %	Ref.
Bristol Rovers	13 May 1996	29 January 2001	247	90	70	87	36.4	
Queens Park Rangers	26 February 2001	6 February 2006	252	100	71	81	39.7	
Plymouth Argyle	28 June 2006	21 November 2007	71	28	23	20	39.4	
Leicester City	22 November 2007	23 May 2008	32	9	8	15	28.1	
Blackpool	21 May 2009	3 November 2012	161	62	43	56	38.5	
Crystal Palace	4 November 2012	23 October 2013	46	14	14	18	30.4	
Millwall	7 January 2014	10 March 2015	62	14	19	29	22.6	
Queens Park Rangers	11 November 2016	10 May 2018	80	26	14	40	32.5	
Grimsby Town	31 December 2019	23 December 2020	38	11	9	18	28.95	
Swindon Town	25 October 2024	Present	113	49	25	39	43.36	
Total			1,101	402	296	403	36.5	

== Honours ==
=== Player ===
Wimbledon

- Football League Second Division promotion: 1985–86

Bristol Rovers

- Football League Third Division: 1989–90
- Associate Members' Cup runner-up: 1989–90

=== Manager ===
Queen's Park Rangers

- Football League Second Division promotion: 2003–04

Blackpool

- Football League Championship play-offs: 2010

Crystal Palace

- Football League Championship play-offs: 2013

Individual

- Football League Championship Manager of the Month: September 2004, August 2012
- Football League Second Division Manager of the Month: February 2003, November 2003
- EFL League Two Manager of the Month: January 2025

== Bibliography ==
- Little Book of Ollie'isms (2008)
- Ollie: The Autobiography of Ian Holloway (2009)
- How To Be A Football Manager (2023)
- Ian Holloway: The (mostly) Football World According to Ollie (2025)

== See also ==
- List of football managers with the most matches
