= To.get.her =

to.get.her
- Directed by: Erica Dunton
- Written by: Erica Dunton
- Produced by: Erica Dunton
- Starring: Jazzy De Lisser; Chelsea Logan; Adwoa Aboah; Audrey Speicher; Jami Eaton; Jill Jackson; Ed Wagenseller
- Cinematography: Derek E. Tindall
- Edited by: James Devlin
- Music by: Michael Tremante
- Production company: Puella Films
- Release dates: January 21, 2011 (Sundance Film Festival); January 15, 2013 (Digitally)
- Running time: 86 minutes
- Country: United States
- Language: English
- Budget: $27,000

to.get.her is a 2011 American mystery thriller film directed by Erica Dunton, starring Jazzy De Lisser, Chelsea Logan, Adwoa Aboah, Audrey Speicher, Jami Eaton, Jill Jackson and Ed Wagenseller. It had its premier at the Sundance Film Festival in 2011, where it won the Best of NEXT Audience Award, and was released digitally on 15 January 2013.

== Cast ==
- Jazzy De Lisser as Ana Frost
- Chelsea Logan as China Rees
- Adwoa Aboah as Emily Mateo
- Audrey Speicher as Abigail Pearce
- Jami Eaton as Zoe Lindermann
- Jill Jackson as Margaret Frost
- Ed Wagenseller as Robert Engledew
- Jon Stafford as Peter
- Jason Davis as Bryan
- Cullen Moss as Paul
- Taylor Kowalski as Gus
- James Forgey as Daniel
- Traci Dinwiddie as Ruth
- Tammy Arnold as Therapist
- Trisha Paytas as Fantasy Girl

== Production ==
to.get.her was filmed over 12 days entirely in Wilmington, North Carolina with a Canon EOS 7D, which is primarily a still camera. Approximately 85% of the film was shot with a 600mm anamorphic lens, which caused the camera to be positioned up to two blocks away from the actors.

== Release ==
The film premiered at the Sundance Film Festival on 21 January 2011, where it won the Best of NEXT Audience Award.

It was released digitally for purchase on 15 January 2013, along with 12 other recent Sundance movies to help promote the 2013 festival, and then streaming on Netflix and Hulu on February 15.

== Reception ==
Michael Dunaway of Paste gave the film a rating of 8.1/10, calling it "visually interesting and innovative", and praised the performances of De Lisser and Aboah.

Rob Nelson of Variety wrote that while Dunton "strains for high-school gravitas and achieves a smidgen of it in her twisty final reel", the "absurdity" of the film and the "horrid" dialogue "ought to prevent its graduation from an award-winning Sundance bow to release."

The Hollywood Reporter wrote that the action is "competently framed but plagued by filter effects that do nothing to make the tedious drama less annoying to sit through."
