= Sir Bernard Lovell Academy =

Location
- North Street; Oldland Common, South Gloucestershire, BS30 8TS; England
- Coordinates: 51.44337°N 2.4714°W

Information
- Type: Academy
- Established: 2015
- Trust: Futura Learning Partnership
- Department for Education URN: 141665 Tables
- Ofsted: Reports
- Chair: Jean Spriggs
- Principal: Robin Bassford
- Executive Principal: Andrea Arlidge
- Gender: Mixed
- Age: 11 to 18
- Capacity: 1,409
- Houses: Europa; Atlas; Callisto; Titan
- Website: http://www.sbllearning.org.uk/

Sir Bernard Lovell Academy is a comprehensive school in North Street, Oldland Common, South Gloucestershire, England. The school is named after the astronomer Sir Bernard Lovell, who was born on the current site in 1913.

It has been on the same site since the 1960s, when it was a girls school, later the main school was added and now takes boys and girls from 11 to 18 years old. The girls school still exists as a school canteen and small classrooms, as well as housing the year 10 and 11 common room (Galileo Building). Previously a foundation school administered by South Gloucestershire Council, Sir Bernard Lovell School converted to academy status on 1 April 2015 and is now sponsored by the Wellsway Multi-Academy Trust. However the school continues to co-ordinate with South Gloucestershire Council for admissions.

Notable former pupils at the school include Marcus Trescothick, who helped the England cricket team regain The Ashes title against their fierce Australian rivals in 2005, Craig Figes who captained the Team GB Waterpolo Team at London 2012 and Ian Holloway, a former manager of Queens Park Rangers F.C.
