= Theo Adams =

British performance artist

- Born: 29 September 1989 (age 37); London, England
- Known for: Theatre performance, film, music, dance, musical theatre

Theo Adams (born 29 September 1989 in London, England) is a performance artist and director of the contemporary theatrical performance group Theo Adams Company.

== Biography ==
=== Education ===
Adams studied at Fine Arts College, Hampstead. He left the formal education system early, at the age of 15 to concentrate on performance.

=== Work ===
Adams is known for both his live productions and film work. He made his professional stage debut aged 9 in the Royal National Theatre's production of An Inspector Calls directed by Stephen Daldry at the Garrick Theatre in London's West End. Ponystep Magazine described the 15-year-old Adams as "central to a scintillating brand of gender-dysphoric, mid-2000s London nightclub chaos" and, over the next few years, he "turned his arresting social presence and brilliant performance compulsion into high art".

After several solo shows which he performed internationally, Adams formed The Theo Adams Company with their first performance on 4 January 2008 at the Tate Britain . The contemporary theatrical performance art group comprises a collection of dancers, performers, actors, artists and musicians creating work described by CNN as part ballet, part theater, part pop.

Adams has contributed to a number of magazines including W Magazine, i-D and Dazed & Confused, appeared on the cover of Time Out London and was featured topless in the June 2008 issue of French Playboy shot by Rankin. Adams has starred in music videos for artist such as Florence and the Machine and Róisín Murphy and was the focus of the BBC documentary Singing with the Enemy in 2007.

In April 2009, The Theo Adams Company completed their Performance project, a series of performances in an abandoned Catholic school in northwest London. It was published as a 16-page photo feature in the May 2009 issue of W Magazine with photography by David Sims. The company invited and were joined in their performances by special guests Lorna Luft daughter of Judy Garland and Tony award-winner Frances Ruffelle. On 27 February 2010 the short film made as part of the project was screened at the P.S.1 Contemporary Art Center in New York. It was then screened at the Institute of Contemporary Art, Philadelphia on 23 June 2010

In November 2009, The Theo Adams Company announced Cry Out a new theatrical production. The world premiere took place on 30 November 2009 at the Za Koenji Theatre in Tokyo, Japan. While in Tokyo, Theo Adams Company were invited to give a lecture at the Musashino Art University about their work. The production and build up to the world premiere was captured on film for the documentary, 9 Days Of Cry Out. It had its premiere screening on 28 February 2010 in Tokyo. The full production had its European premiere on 8 May at Klangraum, in Krems, one of the oldest Mendicant orders’ churches in world. The performance was part of the annual Donaufestival in Austria. The performance was part of the final night of the festival which was curated by Peaches

It was announced on 15 November 2010 that The Theo Adams Company would present their UK premiere of 'Cry Out' at the Institute of Contemporary Arts, London on 18 and 19 December 2010 and tickets sold out within a day.

In June 2010, Adams was the youngest person to be shortlisted in the Emerging Performance category for the Hospital Club and Independent Newspaper's 100. A search for the most influential people in the creative and media industries.

On 14 October 2010, Louis Vuitton presented a new promenade performance production by Theo Adams Company in Tokyo, Japan. Collaborating with some of the most respected people within the performance world including Emmy award-winning set designer Joseph Bennett and Complicité's stage designer and Tony award nominee Rumi Matsui, the company transformed a warehouse on the edge of Tokyo bay into a maze of rooms and walkways. Adams' integrated international actors, singers and dancers within several separate performances around the space. The performance culminated in a finale performance on a two story high set featuring a cast of over 50 and a special performance by legendary Disco group Sister Sledge
