= Candida Cave =

Candida Cave is a British painter, playwright and art historian. In 1978, she and artist Nicholas Cochrane founded Hampstead Fine Arts College, an independent sixth form college specialising in the study of Arts and Humanities, where she is Principal.

Cave studied painting at the Ruskin School of Drawing and Fine Art, Oxford. She paints in oil and tempera and her work is inspired by medieval miniatures, illuminated manuscripts and Gothic stained glass. Her work has been exhibited at the Mall Galleries, London and the Limetree Kitchen and in the ARTWAVE Visual Arts Festival.

Her plays include Still Lives, Savonarola, Bonfires and Vanities and Lotte's Journey Her most recent play, about the Mitford sisters, had a rehearsed reading at the Lyric Studio, Hammersmith. Cave's plays are often set in an historical context and have been performed at the Royal Academy of Arts, the British Museum, Tate Britain, the National Portrait Gallery, London theatres and for the British Council in Florence, Bologna and Rome.
