= Sara Berman (fashion designer) =

British fashion designer (born 1976)

- Born: 1976 (age 49–50); London, England
- Education: Fine Arts College; Central Saint Martins
- Labels: Sara Berman; Berman Black

Sara Berman (born 1976) is a British fashion designer whose eponymous womenswear brand operated from 1998 until 2012, when she put the label on hold to focus on fine art. Producing clothing for London stores before she graduated and achieving success within a year of leaving fashion college, she won both New Generation (NewGeN) awards and a UK fashion export award.

The brand was known for its knits, quirky prints and tailored pieces.

== Early life and career ==
Sara Berman was born in 1976, the daughter of fashion designer Helene Berman. She studied at Fine Arts College in Hampstead, and Central St Martins College of Art and Design. While at St Martins she worked with Jasper Conran, Charles & Patricia Lester, and Armani, and, after she left, she worked for Maria Grachvogel. Berman's graduate collection was taken up by Fenwicks.

== Establishment of eponymous label ==
Some sources place the launch of Sara Berman in 1999, but her label was first mentioned in The Times in 1998, which commented on Indian embroidered silk skirts available at Fenwicks. She was described then as: "a new British design talent". These first skirts had been created while Berman was still at design college and made from saris. Thanks to her mother's connections she managed to get them produced and they appeared in Joseph as well as Fenwicks.

In 1999, her designs appeared in Fenwicks' Bond Street store window during London Fashion Week. Examples from her collections – including sheepskin accessories, spotted cotton summer skirts and blouses and full silk skirts with net layering – appeared regularly in the fashion pages of The Times throughout this period. The paper also noted that within a year of graduating, Berman had made it into the boutiques Mimi and Tokio, alongside Fenwick.

Berman took advantage of her mother's contacts in building the company. Her sister Amiee Berman joined as a business partner and co-designer, having herself studied at Central Saint Martins. By 2002, Sara Berman had won the Marks and Spencer New Generation award three times, which was seen as an unusual achievement.

In 2002, Berman featured – alongside Burberry, Paul Smith and Eley Kishimoto – in a feature about the direction of London designers. She was described as: "shaping up to be the thinking It girl's darling". In a profile that year, she described how she had turned down a fashion job offer in Italy after realising the salary was in lira rather than sterling. She also revealed that she managed all stages of production of her garments and of fabric selection – having grown up visiting garment factories with her mother. By 2003 The Guardian had listed Sara Berman as one of three women in the field of fashion to keep an eye on, noting that her designs were Liberty's second-highest seller and that she was often featured in Vogue magazine.

In 2005 Sara Berman won the UK Fashion Export Award for designer womenswear. The label developed a range of lines for American brands Anthropologie and Urban Outfitters. High-profile wearers included Gwen Stefani and Zadie Smith. By then, the label was being sold in 60 stores around the world. This included trousers for a US department store and pieces for Harrods and Harvey Nichols.

=== Launch of second label ===
By 2008 the Sara Berman brand had a second label, Berman Black, and Berman also acted as creative director of the cashmere brand N.Peal. Berman also created ranges for Urban Outfitters and ASOS.

In 2012, Berman withdrew from fashion design to focus on fine art.

== Art Career ==
In 2016, she graduated in Fine Art from the Slade School of Fine Art, and her fashion influences have become clearer in her art practice. In a 2018 interview with Vanessa Murrell via DATEAGLE ART, she mentioned “I am endlessly fascinated by manufacturing and its relationship to a particular time, as well as concepts of luxury and of modernity. I am also a keen observer of people as consumers.”
