= Project Power =

2020 film by Henry Joost & Ariel Schulman

- Promotional release poster
- Directed by: Henry Joost; Ariel Schulman
- Written by: Mattson Tomlin
- Produced by: Eric Newman; Bryan Unkeless
- Starring: Jamie Foxx; Joseph Gordon-Levitt; Dominique Fishback; Rodrigo Santoro; Colson Baker; Allen Maldonado; Amy Landecker; Courtney B. Vance
- Cinematography: Michael Simmonds
- Edited by: Jeff McEvoy
- Music by: Joseph Trapanese
- Production companies: Screen Arcade; Supermarche
- Distributed by: Netflix
- Release date: August 14, 2020
- Running time: 114 minutes
- Country: United States
- Language: English
- Budget: $85.1 million

Project Power is a 2020 American science fiction action film directed by Henry Joost and Ariel Schulman, produced by Eric Newman and Bryan Unkeless, and written by Mattson Tomlin. It stars Jamie Foxx, Joseph Gordon-Levitt, and Dominique Fishback, alongside Colson Baker, Rodrigo Santoro, Amy Landecker and Allen Maldonado, and follows a drug dealer, a police officer, and a former soldier who team up to stop the distribution of a pill that gives the user superpowers for five minutes.

The film was released on August 14, 2020, by Netflix. It received mixed-to-positive reviews from critics, who praised the performances of the cast, action sequences and visuals but criticized the screenplay.

== Plot ==
In near-future New Orleans, a mysterious distributor offers a free supply of "Power"—a pill that grants various superpowers for five minutes—to a group of drug dealers, including one named Newt.

Newt's teenage cousin Robin is a dealer herself and is friends with NOPD Officer Frank Shaver, one of her regular buyers; Frank's Power makes him bulletproof. Art, a man hunting for the distributor "Biggie", tracks down Newt, who eventually explodes while overdosing on Power. Frank foils a bank robbery by a Power-enhanced thief, but is suspended for using Power himself. His captain reveals that government personnel are pressuring him to terminate any investigation into Power, and gives Frank a picture of the man they suspect to be the source of the drug: Art.

Using Newt's phone to find and abduct Robin, Art forces her to take him to the drug cartel's safehouse. He is shot while fighting the cartel's men, and discovers that Power users in New Orleans are being monitored as test subjects for the drug. Art bonds with Robin as she treats his wounds, and reveals that after leaving the military, he was recruited by Teleios, a private defense contractor who experimented on him to create superpowers. His daughter Tracy, born after the experiments, exhibited powers without ever taking the drug, and was abducted by Wallace, a Teleios operative.

Art and Robin find Biggie hosting a private demonstration of Project Power for a potential buyer near the Superdome, where large groups of Saints fans are arriving for a home game. Biggie claims that Power represents "the next evolution of the human species", with the pill's powers derived from the abilities of animals, such as the chameleon or the wolverine frog. Art interrogates Biggie at gunpoint and learns of a ship, the Genesis, but Frank intervenes, having tracked other users to the demonstration. Biggie takes a dose of Power, forcing Art to kill Biggie in an explosion.

Frank arrests Art but Art explains that the Power epidemic in New Orleans is mass testing to stabilize the drug, and Tracy is the source of the drug's powers. He tells Frank that his captain is actually taking orders from Teleios and they're planning to kill Frank and take Art. Frank decides to help Art. Art has himself captured by Teleios and taken aboard the Genesis while Frank and Robin infiltrate the ship. Frank and Art kill Wallace, while Robin finds Tracy and reunites her with her father.

Robin is captured by Dr. Gardner, the head of Project Power, who demands Tracy in exchange for Robin's life. Art confronts Gardner, using Power, which gives him abilities similar to the pistol shrimp; he causes a huge explosion that kills Gardner and her men. Despite this costing Art his life, Tracy resurrects him with her healing powers. The group escapes the ship via lifeboat.

Afterward, Frank intends to expose Project Power to the press, while Art decides to move on and live peacefully with Tracy. He gives Robin his truck and a bag of money to cover her mother's medical needs, and departs with Tracy, finally free.

== Cast ==
- Jamie Foxx as Art; a U.S. Army Major and Delta Force operator who was one of Power's original test subjects; he possesses the ability inherited from a pistol shrimp, thus being able to launch powerful heatwaves from his body.
- Joseph Gordon-Levitt as Frank Shaver; a NOPD detective. He receives Power that hardens his skin, effectively making him bulletproof.
- Dominique Fishback as Robin Reilly; a street-smart Power dealer who aspires to be a rap artist.
- Colson Baker as Newt Lasalle; Robin's cousin and fellow Power dealer, who possesses the ability to generate fire from his body.
- Rodrigo Santoro as Biggie; one of Power's creators, who possesses the ability to rapidly increase in size and strength.
- Amy Landecker as Gardner
- Allen Maldonado as Landry
- Kyanna Simone Simpson as Tracy; Art's daughter who possess the ability to heal organic matter; her powers were inherited from her father and don't need to be triggered
- Courtney B. Vance as Captain Crane; Shaver's NOPD commanding officer.
- Casey Neistat as Moto, Candy's boyfriend.
- Yoshi Sudarso as Knifebones; a henchman of Gardner's who possesses the ability of turning his bones into weapons. His power was inherited from a wolverine frog.
- Jane Chika Oranika as Akeela; Robin's classmate.
- Jazzy De Lisser as Candy; Moto's girlfriend who has an ability of thermal regulation
- Azhar Khan as Guello, a drug dealer

== Production ==
In October 2017, it was announced that Netflix had acquired Mattson Tomlin's spec script Power in a bidding war with several other studios. Ariel Schulman and Henry Joost would direct the film, with Eric Newman and Bryan Unkeless producing. In September 2018, Jamie Foxx, Joseph Gordon-Levitt and Dominique Fishback joined the cast of the then-untitled film. In October 2018, Rodrigo Santoro, Amy Landecker, Allen Maldonado, Kyanna Simone Simpson, Andrene Ward-Hammond, Machine Gun Kelly, and Casey Neistat joined the cast of the film. In November 2018, Jim Klock joined the cast of the film. In December 2018, Courtney B. Vance joined the cast of the film. In July 2020, it was announced that the film would officially be titled Project Power.

=== Filming ===
Principal photography began on October 8, 2018, and concluded on December 22, 2018. Filming took place in New Orleans. On October 31, 2018, Joseph Gordon-Levitt was injured during filming while riding a bicycle. The film had a total production budget of $85.1 million, with $80.4 million spent on-location in Louisiana.

== Reception ==
=== Viewership ===
Project Power was released by Netflix on August 14, 2020. It was the top-streamed film on the platform in its first two weekends before finishing in second place in its third. In October 2020, Netflix reported 75 million households watched the film over its first four weeks of release. In November, Variety reported the film was the 12th-most watched straight-to-streaming title of 2020 up to that point.

=== Critical response ===
On review aggregator Rotten Tomatoes, the film holds an approval rating of 61% based on 178 reviews, with an average rating of 5.7/10. The website's critics' consensus reads: "Although it wastes some of the potential of its premise, Project Power is a slick, fun action thriller - and features a star-making turn from Dominique Fishback." Metacritic assigned the film a weighted average score of 51 out of 100, based on 35 critics, indicating "mixed or average reviews".

Writing for The Hollywood Reporter, David Rooney said that "what makes Project Power entertaining is its canny combination of familiar ingredients in a textured real-world milieu that gives it fresh flavor." Kate Erbland of IndieWire gave the film a "C+" and said that "Project Power wrestles with a litany of thorny moral issues (and not only those of the 'great power, great responsibility' vibe) but never fully engages with them. There's broad strokes about the impact of Hurricane Katrina on New Orleans residents, and a paper-thin exploration of the criminal implications of a cop not only using the drug, but buying it off a teenage dealer."

=== Accolades ===
Award	Date of ceremony	Category	Recipient(s)	Result	Ref.
Visual Effects Society Awards	April 6, 2021	Outstanding Visual Effects in a Photoreal Feature	Ivan Moran, Leslie Hough, Joao Sita, Matthew Twyford, Yves Debono	Nominated	
Visual Effects Society Awards	April 6, 2021	Outstanding Effects Simulations in a Photoreal Feature	Yin Lai Jimmy Leung, Jonathan Edward Lyddon-Towl, Pierpaolo Navarini, Michelle Lee	Won	
Visual Effects Society Awards	April 6, 2021	Outstanding Compositing in a Photoreal Feature	Russell Horth, Matthew Patience, Julien Rousseau	Won	
