= Gynecologic cancer =

Cancer of the female reproductive system

Gynecologic cancer is a type of cancer that affects the female reproductive system, including ovarian cancer, uterine cancer, vaginal cancer, cervical cancer, and vulvar cancer.

Gynecological cancers comprise 10-15% of women's cancers, mainly affecting women past reproductive age but posing threats to fertility for younger patients. The most common route for treatment is combination therapy, consisting of a mix of both surgical and non-surgical interventions (radiotherapy, chemotherapy).

In the United States, 82,000 women are diagnosed with gynecologic cancer annually. In 2013, an estimated 91,730 were diagnosed.

== Signs and symptoms ==
Signs and symptoms usually vary depending on the type of cancer. The most common symptoms across all gynecological cancers are abnormal vaginal bleeding, vaginal discharge, pelvic pain and urination difficulties.

Ovarian cancer
- Bloating or abdominal swelling
- Frequent urination
- Pelvic or back pain
- Increased satiety/loss of appetite
- Altered bowel movements
- Fatigue
- Weight loss

Endometrial cancer

- Post-menopausal bleeding
- Abnormal vaginal bleeding (heavy or irregular menstrual cycles)
- Vaginal discharge
- Difficulty urinating
- Pelvic pain

Vaginal cancer

- Abnormal vaginal bleeding
- Vaginal discharge
- Pelvic Pain
- Painful and frequent urination

Cervical cancer

- Abdominal pain
- Foul-smelling vaginal discharge
- Pelvic pain and/or back pain
- Blood spotting
- Post-menopausal bleeding

Vulvar cancer

- Pruritus: persistent itch in the vulva
- Vulvar bleeding
- Vulvar pain, soreness or tenderness
- Burning sensation when urinating
- A visible wart-like mass or sore on the vulva

== Risk factors ==
=== Obesity ===
Obesity is associated with an increased risk of developing gynecologic cancers such as endometrial and ovarian cancer. For endometrial cancer, every 5-unit increase on the BMI scale was associated with a 50-60% increase in risk. Type 1 endometrial cancer is the most common endometrial cancer. As many as 90% of patients diagnosed with Type 1 endometrial cancer are obese. Although a correlation between obesity and ovarian cancer is possible, the association is predominantly found in low-grade subtypes of the cancer.

=== Genetic mutations ===
Genetic mutations such as the BRCA1 and BRCA2 have been strongly linked to the development of ovarian cancer. The BRCA1 mutation has been shown to increase the risk of developing ovarian cancer by 36% - 60%. The BRCA2 mutation has been shown to increase the risk of developing ovarian cancer by 16% - 27%.

=== Human Papilloma Virus (HPV) ===
Human Papilloma Virus (HPV) is a common sexually transmitted disease that has been associated with some gynecologic cancers, including those of the cervix, vagina, and vulva. A clear link between human papilloma virus and cervical cancer has long been established, with HPV associated with 70% to 90% of cases. Persistent human papilloma virus infections have been shown to be a driving factor for 70% to 75% of vaginal and vulvar cancers.

=== Smoking ===
Smoking has been found to be a risk factor for the development of cervical, vulvar and vaginal cancer. Current women smokers are twice as likely to develop cervical cancer compared to their non-smoking counterparts. Several mechanisms have been researched to understand how smoking plays a role in the development of cervical cancer. The cervical epithelium's DNA is damaged due to smoking. DNA damage levels in the cervix cells were higher in smokers when compared to non-smokers. It has also been postulated that smoking can lower the immune response to HPV as well as amplify the HPV-infection in the cervix. Through similar mechanisms, women smokers have also been found to be 3 times more likely to develop vulvar cancer. Smoking has also been associated with an elevated risk for vaginal cancer. Woman smokers are at double the risk for developing vaginal cancer when compared to women non-smokers.

=== Infertility ===
Infertility is a common disease affecting young adults. Some studies have shown that 1 in every 7 couples will fail to conceive due to infertility problems. Infertility is a known risk factor for gynecologic cancers. Infertile women are at a higher risk of developing ovarian cancer and endometrial cancer when compared to fertile women.

=== Medications ===
Pharmacoepidemiologic research shows a rare but elevated rate of gynecologic cancers following certain medications, such as prolactin-increasing antipsychotics.

== Treatments ==
=== Ovarian cancer ===
The vast majority of cases are detected past the point of metastasis beyond the ovaries, implicating a higher risk of morbidity and a need for aggressive combination therapy. Surgery and cytotoxic agents are typically required. Histology type is almost primarily epithelial, so treatments will refer to this subtype of pathology.

Ovarian cancer is highly treatable with surgery for almost all cases with a well-differentiated stage-1 tumour. Higher tumour grades may benefit from adjuvant treatment such as platinum-based chemotherapy.

Optimal debulking is used to treat cases where cancer has spread to become macroscopically advanced. The goal of this procedure is to leave no tumour larger than 1 cm by the removal of significant portions of affected reproductive organs. Multiple interventions may be used to achieve optimal debulking, including abdominal hysterectomy, bilateral salpingo-oophorectomy, omentectomy, lymph node sampling, and peritoneal biopsies. There is a lack of randomized controlled trials comparing outcomes between chemotherapy and optimal debulking, so the current standard of care typically involves the sequential administration of both, beginning with surgical interventions.

Interval debulking surgery may be employed halfway through chemotherapy following primary surgery if the tumour remains above 1 cm in diameter. This has been shown to increase median survival of chemosensitive patients by up to 6 months.

A second-look laparotomy may be used to assess tumour status in clinical trials, but is not a staple of standard care due to a lack of association with improved outcomes.

Fertility preserving surgery involves a thorough differential diagnosis to rule out germ cell cancer or abdominal lymphoma, both of which resemble advanced ovarian cancer in presentation but are treatable with gentler methods. Fertility preserving surgery is one of the few cases where a second look laparotomy is recommended for caution.

Platinum-based chemotherapy is paramount to the treatment of epithelial ovarian cancer. Carboplatin tends to fare better than cisplatin for side effects and use in the outpatient setting in randomized clinical trials. Paclitaxel is a particularly effective add-on for late-stage ovarian cancer. Some studies suggest that intraperitoneal chemotherapy may be advantageous over an intravenous route.

=== Cervical cancer ===
Cervical cancer is treated with surgery up to stage 2A. Local excision via loop cone biopsy is sufficient if detected in the earliest stage. If a patient presents beyond this point, bilateral lymphadenectomy is performed to assess metastasis to pelvic lymph nodes. If lymph nodes are negative, then excision of the uterus is performed. Otherwise, a combination of hysterectomy and radiotherapy is frequently employed. This combination approach may be substituted with chemoradiotherapy alone in some.

=== Endometrial cancer ===
Hysterectomy and bilateral oophorectomy are performed for early-stage disease. More aggressive cases with lymphatic spread are often treated with radiotherapy. Hormone therapy is most commonly used to treat systemic spread, as endometrial cancer patients tend to be older and have other illnesses that make them poor candidates to withstand harsh cytotoxic agents used in chemotherapy. Minimal laparoscopic surgery is used for endometrial cancer more than any other gynecologic cancer, and may confer advantages over classical surgical interventions.

=== Vulvar cancer ===
Low incidence means that evidence-based therapy is relatively weak, but emphasis is placed on accurate assessment of cancerous tissue and reducing lymphatic spread.

The minority of non-squamous histological subtypes do not typically require removal of the inguinal nodes. However, this is necessary to prevent spread in squamous cell carcinomas exceeding 1 mm in stromal invasion. If nodal disease is confirmed, adjuvant radiotherapy is administered.

=== Vaginal cancer ===
Treatment depends on the stage of vaginal cancer. Surgical resection and definitive radiotherapy are the first-line of treatment for early-stage vaginal cancer. Surgery is preferred over radiotherapy due to the preservation of the ovaries and sexual function as well as the elimination of the risk of radiation. For more advanced stages of vaginal cancer, external-beam radiation therapy (EBRT) is the standard treatment method. External-beam radiation therapy involves the delivery of a boost to the pelvic side of the patient at a 45 Gy dose.

== Prognosis ==
The experience of cancer influences the psychological aspect of sexuality, by posing a risk of developing barriers such as body image issues, low self-esteem, and low mood or anxiety. Other barriers include changes to reproductive organs or sex drive as well as potential genital pain. Partners may also be affected by these changes in the relationship, especially concerning intimacy and sexuality, which may in turn affect gynecological cancer patients by creating a perception of adverse relationship outcomes such as emotional distance or lack of interest.

== Epidemiology ==
- 1 in 70 women will develop ovarian cancer at some point in their life. Scandinavian countries have an incidence appropriately 6.5 times higher than that of Japan's. This is due to multifactorial reasons, both of genetic and environmental nature.
- Cervical cancer makes up the largest percentage of gynaecological cancers. Women in developing countries tend to present with more advanced cases.
