= Fine Arts College =

Private further education college in London, England

Location
- Centre Studios; 41–43 Englands Lane; Belsize Park; London, NW3 4YD; England; 51.5467°N 0.1646°W

Information
- Type: Private school
- Established: 1978
- Department for Education URN: 100084 Tables
- Principal: Candida Cave
- Gender: Mixed
- Age: 13 to 19
- Website: http://www.hampsteadfinearts.com/

Fine Arts College is an independent college in Hampstead, London, founded in 1978, with an average intake of 200 students aged 13 – 19.

The College offers over 25 A-level subjects in the Arts, Humanities and Social Sciences and 15 subjects at GCSE. Students entering Year 9 follow an academic curriculum alongside creative subjects, art, music and drama. In 2023, the school achieved 45% A/A* in A-level and 41* 9-7 in GCSE.

Fine Arts runs a one year Portfolio course to prepare students for degree courses at university and art school.

The Principal is Candida Cave and the Head is Emmy Schwieters.

== History ==
The College was founded in 1978 by artists Nicholas Cochrane and Candida Cave and was originally located in the YMCA on Tottenham Court Road and specialised in the teaching of Art and History of Art. In 1982, the College relocated to Belsize Park and expanded its curriculum to cover the 25 subjects it teaches today. In 1994, the GCSE department opened, followed by Year 9 entry in 2018.

In 2002 the College moved to Centre Studios, a converted Victorian dairy in Englands Lane, which remains its main site today.

In 2015 the College became part of the Dukes Education Group.

== Buildings ==
The College operates across three separate sites within about 200 yards of one another, located between Belsize Park, Chalk Farm and Swiss Cottage tube stations. The main site, Centre Studios, houses the academic departments and the Fine Art, Graphics, Music, Music Technology, Media, Textiles, Film Studies, and Drama studios. The two other sites are the Photography studios and Maths and Science departments in Lambolle Place.

== Notable former pupils ==
- Theo Adams, artist and director
- Alfie Allen, actor
- Brooklyn Beckham, model and photographer, son of David Beckham and Victoria Beckham
- Sara Berman & Aimee Berman, fashion designers
- Orlando Bloom, actor
- JJ Feild, actor
- Mae Muller, singer
- Kayvan Novak, actor and director
- Mel Raido, actor
- Coco Sumner, singer
- Amelia Warner, actress
- Liam Watson, music producer
- Lila Moss, Model
- Princess Maria-Olympia of Greece and Denmark, model and member of the Greek Royal Family
- Helena Bonham Carter, actress
- Rafferty Law, actor and model
- Johnny Borrell, guitarist and singer
- Lady Elizabeth Iris Clara Paget, actress and model
- Eliza Doolittle, Singer
- Jane Green, Author
- Jazzy de Lisser, actress and model
