= Susana Banerjee =

English gynecologic oncologist, researcher

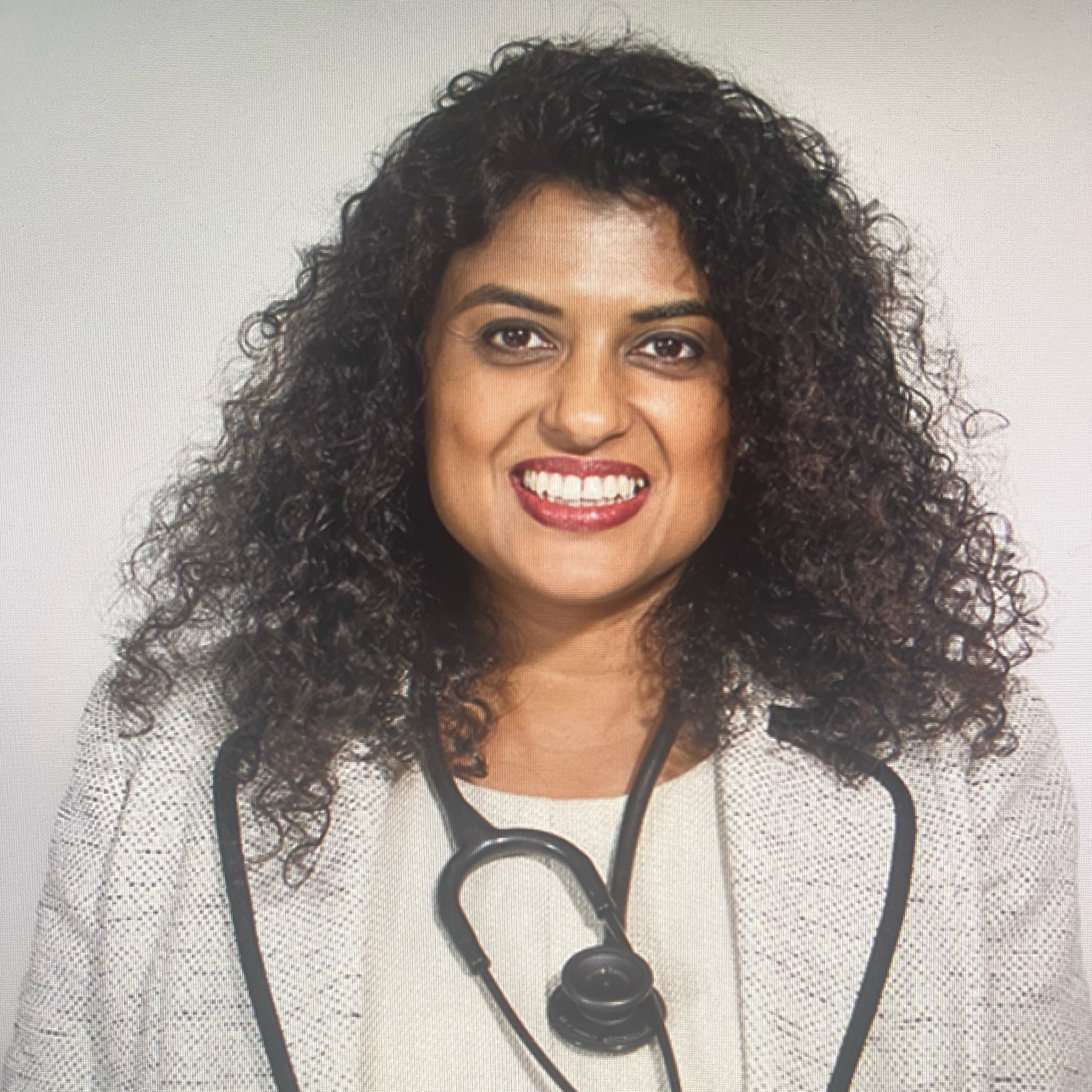
Professor Susana Banerjee

Susana Banerjee is an English oncologist who is Research Lead within the Gynaecology Unit at London's The Royal Marsden. She is Professor in Women's Cancers and Team Leader at the Institute of Cancer Research.

== Educational background and accomplishments ==
Banerjee has a First-Class degree in Physiology from St John’s College, University of Cambridge. She was President of the Cambridge Medical Society (1996-1997). She completed her medical training in 2000 at The Royal Free / University College London Medical School, where she was a University of London Gold Medal finalist. In 2009, she obtained her PhD from the Institute of Cancer Research, University of London, and her research received the San Antonio Breast Cancer Symposium Novartis Oncology Basic Science Award. She received the Association of Cancer Physicians McElwain Prize, the Sir Antony Driver Prize, and the Pfizer British Oncology Association Young Investigator Award. In 2023 Banerjee received the Fellow of ESMO (FESMO) Award.

== Professional engagements ==
Banerjee participates in various international specialist groups. In the field of oncology, Banerjee has contributed to the European Society of Medical Oncology (ESMO), Serving as Executive Board as Director of Membership (2020-2022). She was Track Chair for Gynaecological Cancers for the ESMO Congress 2018, Scientific Co-Chair for ESMO Asia 2018 and Co-Chair of the ESMO Gynaecological Cancers Congress 2021-2024. She is currently co-chair of the Gynecological Cancer InterGroup (GCIG) Rare Cancers Committee. She is a Theme Lead (Cancer Treatment Effects) for the National Institute for Health and Care Research (NIHR) Biomedical Research Centre (BRC) at The Royal Marsden NHS Foundation Trust and The Institute of Cancer Research. She has served in the European Organization for Research and Treatment of Cancer (EORTC), Executive Steering Committee for Gynaecological Cancers, engagement as a faculty member of ESGO (European Society of Gynaecological Oncology) Congress, and her role within the International Gynecological Cancer Society Scientific Program Committee.

== Scientific work ==
Banerjee is a researcher working in clinical trials collaborating with leading scientists on early-phase studies, contributing to the development of drug treatments. Her body of work comprises over 175 peer-reviewed publications.

Banerjee is a Board Member of the International Cancer Foundation Board.
