= Wellsway School =

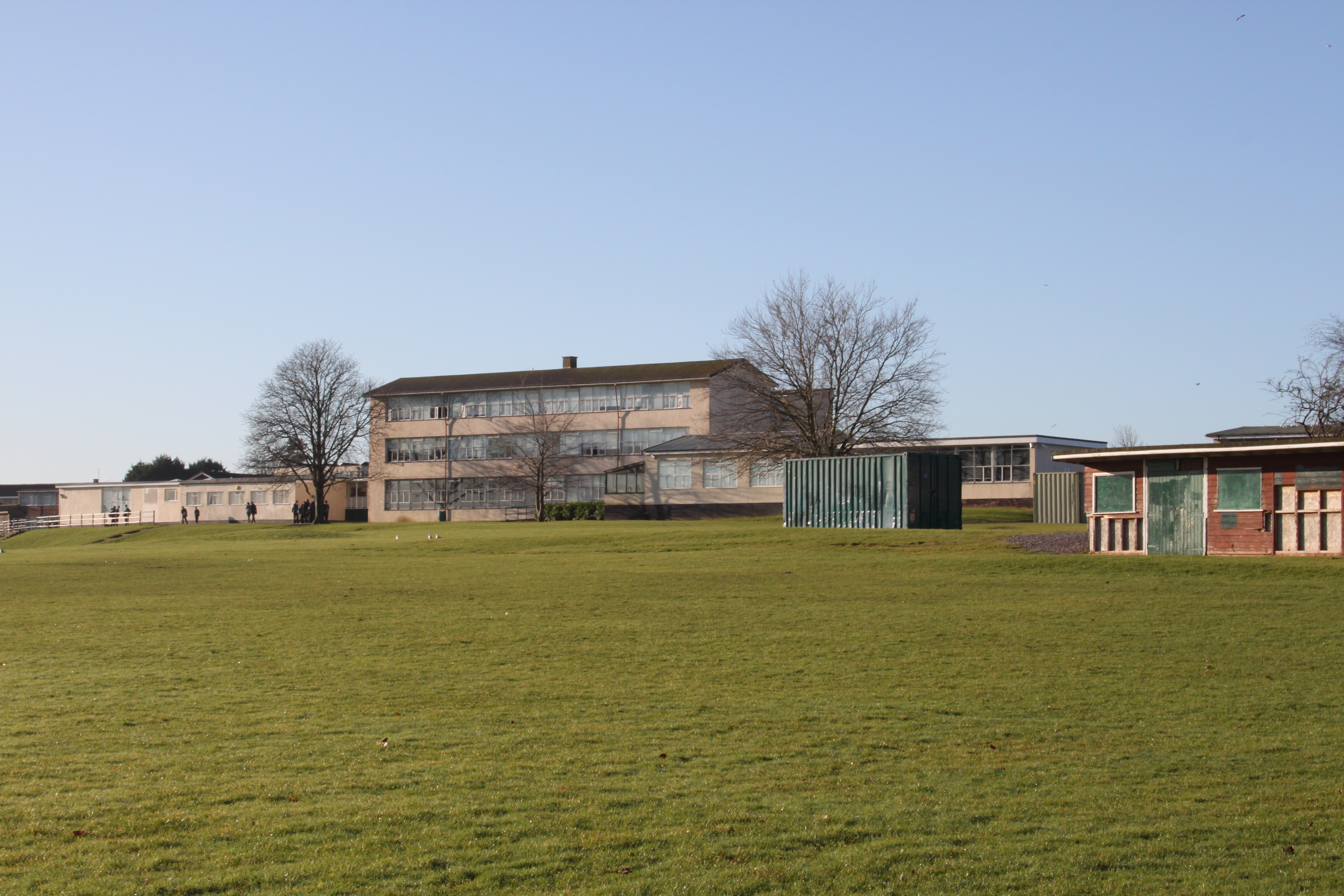

Location
- Chandag Road; Keynsham, Somerset; England; 51.4111°N 2.4871°W

Information
- Type: Academy
- Established: 1971
- Trust: Futura Learning Partnership
- Department for Education URN: 137523 Tables
- Ofsted: Reports
- Principal: Robert Pearsall
- Executive Principal: Andrea Arlidge
- Age: 11 to 18
- Enrolment: 1,266 as of November 2021
- Website: www.wellswayschool.com

Wellsway School is a mixed comprehensive school on the eastern side of Keynsham, Somerset, England, for students aged 11 to 18. In November 2021, there were 1,266 students attending the school, which is run by Futura Learning Partnership and has been an academy since October 2011.

== History ==
Wellsway School was established in 1971, by amalgamating Keynsham Grammar School and Wellsway County Secondary School, both of which opened on a shared site in the mid-1950s.

=== Headteachers ===
Year	
1966–1974	Stanley Jarvis
1974–1989	John Narey
1989–1990	Helen Dance (acting)
1990–1994	Martin Whittle
1994–1995	John Smith and Patricia Baker (joint acting)
1995–2005	Paul Kent
2005–2016	Andrea Arlidge
2016–2020	Matthew Woodville
2021–present	Robert Pearsall

=== House system ===
The house system has been maintained since the opening of both the Keynsham Grammar School and Wellsway County Secondary School in 1956. The pupils of Wellsway were divided into three Houses, each with their own House Master, Staff and Captains. The three houses were Bridges House, Chandos House and Rodney House. The house system as it is today was created when Wellsway School opened in 1971. The four houses are named after local villages; Burnett, Compton, Newton and Stanton. These are then represented by colours: purple for Burnett, blue for Compton, orange for Newton and red for Stanton.

=== Structural changes ===
The school has gone through many changes since its opening in 1956. Many of these are new builds, or extensions, with the original buildings still standing and fully functional.

Key structural changes through the years have been:

Date	
1956	The Keynsham Grammar school was built, and officially opened on 4 October 1957. (Later to be Lansdown Building).
1957	The start of the south east extension began (later to be Mendip Building)
1959	Wellsway County Secondary School was opened
1971	Both schools merged to form a new comprehensive school "Wellsway School'.
1990s	New Art block was built, (known as Quantock building)situated at the front of the building, next to the Drama Studio (used to be an Art Room), and built up to the perimeter fence, next to the secondary entrance (also the Chandag School entrance). Removal of the Swimming pool, which was situated on the edge of Lansdown Courts, next to the Kitchens. Construction of the Sixth Form Extension Block – an extension further out towards the Mendip Playing Courts] extending off the original building.
2000	The Lansdown Hall stage, was ripped out, and turned into Room 30, a full-time Music Room.
2001	New Science Lab – now Room 2a. This build looks out onto the playing fields, adjoining to Room 2, replacing the old greenhouse, which was built on the side of it.
2003	The hut, previously used as Room 30, was demolished to make way for a car park behind the new building.
2003–2004	A Modern Languages Building was built (known as Claverton) where the Swimming Pool once stood. 2004 also saw the Technology Extension, extending the Technology building outwards.
2004	Demolition of Temporary Huts – Rooms 55 & 56. The quad is now known as the Laura Allen Garden, in memory of Laura Allen who died in January 2004. Further demolition of temporary huts, with Room 4a, originally a Science Lab, then a Special Needs Classroom knocked down.
2005	Construction of the Artificial turf pitch, built on top of the Cricket Square, situated on the upper tier of the playing fields.
2007	Construction of new Youth and Community Centre – built on the south end of the school.
2008	During the summer of 2008, the new Sixth Form Learning Centre was created.
2015-16	The new IKB studio school was built next to the Landsdown Building.

Minor structural changes:

Date	
2007	The replacement of Mendip building's roof. A new cricket square was added after receiving a grant of £8,500 from the MCC for the square. The Resources Centre]was relocated to make way for the new Student Support Centre. The Resources Centre was relocated to where the Careers Centre (and previously a Staffroom) had been located. The Careers Centre was relocated to one end of the Library which was renamed the Learning Resource Centre. Structural changes saw windows knocked through the existing wall.
2015	The windows in the Landsdown Building were replaced.

== Statistics ==
Most students that attend the school live in Keynsham and Saltford or the nearby villages.

== Campus ==
Wellsway School is on the eastern side of Keynsham in a spacious campus with open and green fields. The campus has three areas: Lansdown Building, Mendip Building and the playing fields. A review of schools within Bath and North East Somerset during 2010 identified some buildings which were in poor condition and proposed expanding Wellsway and closing Broadlands School to create a single school in Keynsham, though a decision was made not to proceed with this proposal.

== Curriculum teams and subjects ==
In 2005/2006, the staff structure was reviewed at Wellsway, resulting in the departmental structure being revised. From September 2006, the previous structure was replaced by curriculum teams, which in some cases, comprises more than one subject team.

In 2016 the structure was as follows:

Curriculum Teams	Subject Teams
Maths	Maths, Further Maths, Computing
English	English (Language and Literature)
Science	Biology, Chemistry, Physics
Physical Education and Performing Arts	PE, Dance, Drama, Music
Humanities	History, Geography, Religious Studies
Modern Foreign Languages	French, Spanish, Business
Design, Art and Technology	Technology, Food, Art

== Initiatives ==
=== Sports & Science Centre of Excellence ===
Wellsway's bid for specialist school status was accepted in September 2007, giving it Sports and Science College status. A joint bid was unusual as there were only six schools in the country with a combined Sports and Science specialism. This status provided additional funding of £129 per student per year to spend on teaching and learning. The specialist schools programme ended in 2020.

=== Playing for Success ===
Wellsway School is part of the Playing for Success scheme run by the Department for Children, Schools and Families. Wellsway School takes part in the initiative that takes place at the Bath Rec. This support centre is a 'classroom within a club' which offers after school study support to pupils in Year 8–9.

=== Fairtrade status ===
On 29 March 2007, the school was the first school in the district to be awarded Fair Trade status. Fair Trade coffee, tea and sugar are used in the staff room and other products sold in the school canteen, in Shades, the Sixth Form cafe, and in a weekly tuck shop run by students. Fair Trade issues are integrated in the curriculum and taught in subjects such as Business Studies, Citizenship, Geography and Religious Studies.

== Wellsway Sixth Form College ==
Many sixth form students go on to university. In 2006, the Sixth Form had 280 students aged between 16 and 19, having the choice to study from a range of 25 subjects at AS/A2 level. The students can also take part in a range of extracurricular opportunities, such as Teacher Support sessions, team building exercises, tutorials and theatre trips. A new sixth form learning centre which hosts a computer suite, private study and office area was opened in October 2008.

== Sport ==
Students represent the district, county or region in various sports. Sporting success has been achieved in many sports including cricket, football, rugby union, athletics, netball and especially field hockey. A new artificial turf pitch was constructed in 2005.

Since the opening of the artificial pitch, Wellsway has played XI Mixed Hockey against local schools and in the 2006–2007 season, won the U18 Mixed District Tournament. Players from the school have gone on to play at club level in the area and around the country.

In netball, the U14 team reached the National Championships in Bournemouth and teams for other age groups have been district and regional champions.

Wellsway also supports students who want to pursue a career in Sport, including the RFU Referee's foundation course.

== Futura Learning Partnership ==
Wellsway Multi Academy Trust (MAT) was formed in 2014 and at first comprised six academy schools. The trust expanded significantly and constructed two studio schools, one in Bath and one on the Wellsway site.

The trust also sponsors the Sir Bernard Lovell Academy after its inadequate 2014 Ofsted report.

In 2018 Ofsted found that all the secondary schools other than Wellsway School in the MAT required improvement. The MAT noted that Sir Bernard Lovell Academy had come out of special measures, and the other two schools were first inspections. In 2018, the MAT proposed that Bath Studio School should close in 2020, largely because only 126 places of the school's 300 capacity were in use so the school was being heavily subsidised by the MAT.

The organisation's name was changed in June 2021 from Wellsway Multi Academy Trust to Futura Learning Partnership, reflecting its growth to 13 academies.

=== Academies ===
Name	Type
Wellsway School	Secondary
Bedminster Down School	Secondary
Sir Bernard Lovell Academy, Oldland Common	Secondary
Aspire Academy, Odd Down	Special needs
IKB Academy, Bristol	Studio
Chandag Infant School, Keynsham	Infants
Chandag Junior School, Keynsham	Junior
Cheddar Grove Primary School, Bedminster Down	Primary
Saltford Church of England Primary School	Primary
St Johns CEVC School, Keynsham	Primary
The Meadows Primary School, Bitton	Primary
Two Rivers CE Primary	Keynsham
Wansdyke Primary School, Whitchurch	Primary

The MAT also operates three "Aspire AP" sites offering provision for about 30 children with serious mental health, behavioural and emotional problems.
