= 1971–72 Dundee United F.C. season =

Dundee United
1971–72 season
- Chairman: J. Johnston-Grant
- Manager: Jerry Kerr (to December); Jim McLean (from December)
- Stadium: Tannadice Park
- Scottish First Division: 9th W12 D7 L15 F55 A70 P31
- Scottish Cup: 3rd Round
- League Cup: Group stage
- Texaco Cup: 1st Round

The 1971–72 season was the 63rd year of football played by Dundee United, and covers the period from 1 July 1971 to 30 June 1972. United finished in ninth place in the First Division.

== Match results ==
Dundee United played a total of 43 competitive matches during the 1971–72 season.

=== Legend ===
Win
Draw
Loss

All results are written with Dundee United's score first. Own goals in italics

=== First Division ===
Date	Opponent	Venue	Result	Attendance	Scorers
4 September 1971	St Johnstone	H	3–3	7,540	Gordon, A. Reid, Rolland
11 September 1971	Dundee	A	4–6	13,818	Rolland (2), Gordon, D. Smith (penalty)
18 September 1971	Hibernian	H	1–4	6,674	K. Cameron
25 September 1971	Kilmarnock	A	0–2	3,012	
2 October 1971	Airdrieonians	H	5–0	4,855	Copland (3), Devlin, Rolland
9 October 1971	Greenock Morton	A	2–1	4,331	Rolland, Copland
16 October 1971	Rangers	H	1–5	16,000	Copland
23 October 1971	Clyde	A	3–0	1,277	Copland, White, Henry
30 October 1971	Falkirk	H	3–5	4,373	Gray, Gordon, Copland
6 November 1971	Partick Thistle	A	1–3	8,925	I. Reid
13 November 1971	Celtic	H	1–5	18,187	Gordon
20 November 1971	East Fife	A	1–0	3,558	Traynor
27 November 1971	Motherwell	H	2–0	3,832	Gordon, Copland
4 December 1971	Heart of Midlothian	A	2–3	9,391	Gordon, Traynor
11 December 1971	Ayr United	H	2–2	3,554	K. Cameron, Traynor
18 December 1971	Aberdeen	A	0–3	14,570	
25 December 1971	Dunfermline Athletic	H	3–2	3,998	Gordon, J. Cameron, K. Cameron
1 January 1972	St Johnstone	A	0–2	7,923	
3 January 1972	Dundee	H	1–1	16,954	K. Cameron
8 January 1972	Hibernian	A	0–3	8,364	
15 January 1972	Kilmarnock	H	1–2	3,255	Traynor
29 January 1972	Greenock Morton	H	2–1	3,726	Mitchell, Copland
12 February 1972	Rangers	A	0–1	25,267	
19 February 1972	Clyde	H	3–3	4,183	Knox, Fleming, K. Cameron
4 March 1972	Falkirk	A	1–1	3,949	Knox
11 March 1972	Partick Thistle	H	1–0	4,540	White
25 March 1972	East Fife	H	2–2	4,267	Mitchell (2)
29 March 1972	Airdrieonians	A	1–1	3,247	Knox
1 April 1972	Motherwell	A	1–0	3,324	Knox
8 April 1972	Heart of Midlothian	H	3–2	4,550	Cameron, White, Kopel
15 April 1972	Ayr United	A	2–4	4,203	White, Mitchell
22 April 1972	Aberdeen	H	2–0	5,133	Mitchell, D. Smith
25 April 1972	Celtic	A	0–3	11,036	
29 April 1972	Dunfermline Athletic	A	1–0	7,274	K. Cameron

=== Scottish Cup ===
Date	Rd	Opponent	Venue	Result	Attendance	Scorers
5 February 1972	R3	Aberdeen	H	0–4	12,974	

=== League Cup ===
Date	Rd	Opponent	Venue	Result	Attendance	Scorers
14 August 1971	G4	Kilmarnock	H	1–0	6,613	A. Reid
18 August 1971	G4	Hibernian	A	0–2	12,701	
21 August 1971	G4	Motherwell	H	2–2	5,799	K. Cameron, Traynor
25 August 1971	G4	Hibernian	H	1–4	7,783	Gordon
28 August 1971	G4	Kilmarnock	A	2–4	3,053	K. Cameron, Gordon
1 September 1971	G4	Motherwell	A	3–1	2,760	Rolland (2), A. Reid

=== Texaco Cup ===
Date	Rd	Opponent	Venue	Result	Attendance	Scorers
15 September 1971	R1 1	Derby County	A	2–6	20,059	Gordon, Rolland
29 September 1971	R1 2	Derby County	H	3–2	6,000	Copland, Devlin

== See also ==
- 1971–72 in Scottish football
