= 1972–73 Dundee United F.C. season =

Dundee United
1972–73 season
- Chairman: J. Johnston-Grant
- Manager: Jim McLean
- Stadium: Tannadice Park
- Scottish First Division: 7th W17 D5 L12 F56 A51 P39
- Scottish Cup: 3rd Round
- League Cup: 2nd Round
- Texaco Cup: Quarter-finalists

The 1972–73 season was the 64th year of football played by Dundee United, and covers the period from 1 July 1972 to 30 June 1973. United finished in seventh place in the First Division.

== Match results ==
Dundee United played a total of 45 competitive matches during the 1972–73 season.

=== Legend ===
Win
Draw
Loss

All results are written with Dundee United's score first. Own goals in italics

=== First Division ===
| Date | Opponent | Venue | Result | Attendance | Scorers |
|---|---|---|---|---|---|
| 2 September 1972 | Airdrieonians | H | 3–1 | 3,714 | K. Cameron (2), White |
| 9 September 1972 | St Johnstone | A | 3–1 | 4,033 | Mitchell, Gardner, D. Smith (penalty) |
| 16 September 1972 | Dundee | H | 2–1 | 12,071 | Gardner, White |
| 23 September 1972 | Hibernian | A | 1–3 | 10,372 | Henry |
| 30 September 1972 | Greenock Morton | H | 1–0 | 3,556 | D. Smith (penalty) |
| 7 October 1972 | Motherwell | A | 4–1 | 3,947 | K. Cameron (2), Gardner (2) |
| 14 October 1972 | Heart of Midlothian | H | 3–2 | 8,269 | K. Cameron, Rolland, D. Smith (penalty) |
| 21 October 1972 | Falkirk | A | 0–1 | 4,810 | |
| 28 October 1972 | Ayr United | H | 2–1 | 4,888 | White, D. Smith (penalty) |
| 4 November 1972 | Celtic | A | 1–3 | 30,892 | Gardner |
| 11 November 1972 | Partick Thistle | H | 0–3 | 4,141 | |
| 18 November 1972 | East Fife | A | 0–1 | 4,263 | |
| 25 November 1972 | Aberdeen | H | 3–2 | 8,473 | Gardner (2), Copland |
| 2 December 1972 | Arbroath | A | 4–2 | 4,153 | White (2), Kopel, Henry |
| 9 December 1972 | Rangers | H | 1–4 | 11,241 | Henry |
| 16 December 1972 | Kilmarnock | A | 1–0 | 2,536 | Mitchell |
| 23 December 1972 | Dumbarton | H | 3–2 | 3,890 | Gardner, Rolland, D. Smith (penalty) |
| 30 December 1972 | Airdrieonians | A | 2–2 | 2,700 | Gardner, K. Cameron |
| 1 January 1973 | St Johnstone | H | 5–1 | 9,708 | Knox, Rennie, Markland, K. Cameron, Gardner (penalty) |
| 6 January 1973 | Dundee | A | 0–3 | 13,570 | |
| 13 January 1973 | Hibernian | H | 1–0 | 10,832 | Rolland |
| 27 January 1973 | Motherwell | H | 1–2 | 4,433 | Fleming |
| 10 February 1973 | Heart of Midlothian | A | 2–0 | 4,831 | Gardner, K. Cameron |
| 21 February 1973 | Greenock Morton | A | 0–2 | 2,577 | |
| 3 March 1973 | Ayr United | A | 1–2 | 5,478 | Gardner |
| 7 March 1973 | Falkirk | H | 1–0 | 2,951 | Kennedy |
| 10 March 1973 | Celtic | H | 2–2 | 17,661 | Gardner, K. Cameron |
| 21 March 1973 | Partick Thistle | A | 3–0 | 2,981 | Reid, Traynor, K. Cameron |
| 24 March 1973 | East Fife | H | 1–1 | 4,074 | Traynor |
| 31 March 1973 | Aberdeen | A | 0–0 | 9,603 | |
| 7 April 1973 | Arbroath | H | 1–1 | 4,086 | Winchester |
| 14 April 1973 | Rangers | A | 1–2 | 32,090 | Reid |
| 21 April 1973 | Kilmarnock | H | 2–1 | 3,634 | Fleming, W. Smith |
| 28 April 1973 | Dumbarton | A | 1–4 | 4,719 | Fleming |

=== Scottish Cup ===
| Date | Rd | Opponent | Venue | Result | Attendance | Scorers |
|---|---|---|---|---|---|---|
| 3 February 1973 | R3 | Rangers | A | 0–1 | 35,657 | |

=== League Cup ===
| Date | Rd | Opponent | Venue | Result | Attendance | Scorers |
|---|---|---|---|---|---|---|
| 12 August 1972 | G4 | Dunfermline Athletic | H | 2–0 | 4,947 | K. Cameron, D. Smith (penalty) |
| 16 August 1972 | G4 | Kilmarnock | A | 3–2 | 3,548 | D. Smith (penalty), White, Traynor |
| 19 August 1972 | G4 | Stenhousemuir | H | 5–0 | 3,628 | D. Smith (penalty), Gardner, White, K. Cameron, Knox |
| 23 August 1972 | G4 | Kilmarnock | H | 2–1 | 4,012 | Traynor, Kopel |
| 26 August 1972 | G4 | Dunfermline Athletic | A | 1–0 | 2,999 | K. Cameron |
| 30 August 1972 | G4 | Stenhousemuir | A | 0–2 | 759 | |
| 20 September 1972 | R2 1 | Hibernian | H | 2–5 | 6,500 | Mitchell, Gardner |
| 4 October 1972 | R2 2 | Hibernian | A | 0–0 | 9,134 | |

=== Texaco Cup ===
| Date | Rd | Opponent | Venue | Result | Attendance | Scorers |
|---|---|---|---|---|---|---|
| 13 September 1972 | R1 1 | Leicester City | A | 1–1 | 7,256 | White |
| 27 September 1972 | R1 2 | Leicester City | H | 2–2 | 8,000 | K. Cameron, D. Smith |

== See also ==
- 1972–73 in Scottish football
