= 1973–74 Dundee United F.C. season =

Dundee United
1973–74 season
- Manager: Jim McLean
- Stadium: Tannadice Park
- Scottish First Division: 8th W15 D7 L12 F55 A51 P37
- Scottish Cup: Runners-up
- League Cup: Group stage
- Texaco Cup: Semi-finalists

The 1973–74 season was the 65th year of football played by Dundee United, and covers the period from 1 July 1973 to 30 June 1974. United finished in eighth place in the First Division and reached their first Scottish Cup final losing 3–0 to Celtic.

== Match results ==
Dundee United played a total of 53 competitive matches during the 1973–74 season.

=== Legend ===
Win
Draw
Loss

All results are written with Dundee United's score first. Own goals in italics

=== First Division ===
Date	Opponent	Venue	Result	Attendance	Scorers
1 September 1973	Dumbarton	A	2–1	3,741	Fleming, Gray
8 September 1973	St Johnstone	H	2–0	4,671	Gray, MacDonald
15 September 1973	Dundee	A	1–0	12,092	W Smith
29 September 1973	Motherwell	A	0–4	4,973	
6 October 1973	Clyde	H	4–0	2,817	Gray, Gardner, Rolland, Fleming
13 October 1973	Greenock Morton	A	2–0	2,295	Rolland, Gray
20 October 1973	Rangers	H	1–3	11,258	Johnstone
27 October 1973	Aberdeen	A	1–3	8,089	Gray
10 November 1973	Heart of Midlothian	A	1–1	9,843	Rolland
17 November 1973	East Fife	H	0–0	2,971	
21 November 1973	Falkirk	H	2–1	1,302	Cameron, Knox
24 November 1973	Ayr United	A	1–1	3,764	White
8 December 1973	Celtic	A	3–3	17,314	Gray, Fleming, Knox
22 December 1973	Dunfermline Athletic	A	3–2	3,274	Gray (2), Fleming
29 December 1973	Dumbarton	H	6–0	3,245	Gray (4), Traynor, Kopel
2 January 1974	St Johnstone	A	1–1	6,707	Gardner
5 January 1974	Dundee	H	1–2	12,087	Gardner
12 January 1974	Hibernian	A	1–3	10,394	Edwards
19 January 1974	Motherwell	H	0–1	3,550	
2 February 1974	Clyde	A	2–1	1,351	Traynor, Knox
24 February 1974	Rangers	A	1–3	16,933	Gardner
3 March 1974	Aberdeen	H	0–3	6,530	
16 March 1974	Heart of Midlothian	H	3–3	6,748	Knox, D Smith (penalty), Gray
23 March 1974	East Fife	A	2–0	2,596	Traynor, Gray
30 March 1974	Ayr United	H	2–1	4,010	D Smith (penalty), Gray
2 April 1974	Falkirk	A	1–0	2,014	Knox
13 April 1974	Celtic	H	0–2	16,877	
17 April 1974	Arbroath	H	3–1	4,001	Rolland, Payne, D Smith (penalty)
20 April 1974	Arbroath	A	2–1	3,392	Knox, White
24 April 1974	Partick Thistle	H	1–1	2,626	Knox
27 April 1974	Dunfermline Athletic	H	0–1	3,896	
29 April 1974	Partick Thistle	A	1–2	2,387	Copland
8 May 1974	Hibernian	H	1–4	4,963	Gray
10 May 1974	Greenock Morton	H	4–2	1,437	MacLeod (3 including 1 penalty), Narey

=== Scottish Cup ===
Date	Rd	Opponent	Venue	Result	Attendance	Scorers
26 January 1974	R3	Airdrieonians	H	4–1	6,000	Gardner (2), Traynor, D. Smith
17 February 1974	R4	Greenock Morton	H	1–0	7,000	Rankin
10 March 1974	QF	Dunfermline Athletic	A	1–1	8,928	Traynor
12 March 1974	QF R	Dunfermline Athletic	H	4–0	7,020	Fleming, Copland, Traynor
6 April 1974	SF	Heart of Midlothian	N	1–1	22,725	Gardner
9 April 1974	SF R	Heart of Midlothian	N	4–2	12,960	D. Smith (penalty), Payne, Gray, Knox
4 May 1974	F	Celtic	N	0–3	75,959	

=== League Cup ===
Date	Rd	Opponent	Venue	Result	Attendance	Scorers
11 August 1973	G4	East Fife	A	2–1	3,641	Cameron, Rolland
15 August 1973	G4	Aberdeen	H	0–0	6,401	
18 August 1973	G4	Motherwell	A	0–4	4,783	
22 August 1973	G4	Aberdeen	A	2–0	8,663	Knox, Cameron
25 August 1973	G4	Motherwell	H	0–3	4,507	
29 August 1973	G4	East Fife	H	5–2	3,120	Cameron, Gray, W. Smith, D. Smith (penalty), MacLeod

=== Texaco Cup ===
Date	Rd	Opponent	Venue	Result	Attendance	Scorers
18 September 1973	R1 1	Sheffield United	A	0–0	12,657	
3 October 1973	R1 2	Sheffield United	H	2–0	6,000	Henry (2)
24 October 1973	QF 1	Leicester City	A	1–1	9,036	Kopel
7 November 1973	QF 2	Leicester City	H	1–0	7,500	Fleming
12 December 1973	SF 1	Newcastle United	H	2–0	8,500	Kopel, Knox
19 December 1973	SF 2	Newcastle United	A	1–4	5,009	Gray

== See also ==
- 1973–74 in Scottish football
