= 1968–69 Scottish Cup =

Tournament details
- Country: Scotland

Final positions
- Champions: Celtic
- Runners-up: Rangers

The 1968–69 Scottish Cup was the 84th staging of Scotland's most prestigious football knockout competition. The Cup was won by Celtic who defeated Rangers in the final.

== First preliminary round ==
The First preliminary round was played on 14 December 1968.

14 December 1968	Alloa	6–1	Ross County	Alloa
	Pitterton 6'; Ure 8'; Muir 15' 75'; McCallan 81'	Report; Report 2	Murray 48'	Stadium: Recreation Park; Referee: A. Currie

14 December 1968	Brechin City	1–1	Montrose	Brechin
	Ward	Report	Thomson 3'	Stadium: Glebe Park; Attendance: 1,011; Referee: I. Bain

14 December 1968	Cowdenbeath	1–0	Clydebank
	Bostock 8'	Report		Attendance: 200 (estimated); Referee: R.D. Henderson

14 December 1968	Forfar Athletic	1–2	Nairn County	Forfar
	Carrie 51' (pen.)	Report	Stephen 8'; Thom	Stadium: Station Park; Referee: E.D Crawford

14 December 1968	St Cuthbert Wanderers	1–0	Civil Service Strollers	Kirkcudbright
	Kirkpatrick	Report		Stadium: St. Mary's Park

=== Replay ===
18 December 1968	Montrose	3–2	Brechin City	Montrose
	Ward (?); Archibald (?)	Report	Finn (?) (?) 84'	Stadium: Links Park; Referee: I.K. Bain

== Second preliminary round ==
4 January 1969	Alloa	0–0	East Stirlingshire	Alloa
		Report		Stadium: Recreation Park; Referee: E. H. Pringle

4 January 1969	Dumbarton	3–2	Vale of Leithen	Dumbarton
	McCormack (?) 17'; Watson	Report	Whitehead 9'; Duncan 75'	Stadium: Boghead Park; Attendance: 1000 (estimated); Referee: I.H. McKee

4 January 1969	Glasgow University	5–2	St Cuthbert Wanderers	Glasgow
	Maclaine 4'; Berkeley 26'; Graham; Alexander	Report	McLellan; Martin	Stadium: Westerlands; Referee: E. Thomson

4 January 1969	Hamilton Academical	0–2	Cowdenbeath	Hamilton
		Report	Clark 30'; Bostock 36'	Stadium: Douglas Park; Referee: A.E Currie

4 January 1969	Montrose	6–1	Fraserburgh	Montrose
	Thomson 15' 37' (?); Finn 19'; McDonald (?); Livingstone (?)	Report	Forsyth (?)	Stadium: Links Park; Attendance: 1,400 (estimated); Referee: W. Balfour

4 January 1969	Nairn County	0–2	Berwick Rangers
		Report	Jones 47' (?)	Referee: R.C. Greenlees

4 January 1969	Stenhousemuir	1–0	Albion Rovers	Stenhousemuir
	J Ritchie 11' (pen.)	Report		Stadium: Ochilview Park; Attendance: 750 (estimated); Referee: R.D. Crawford

4 January 1969	Stranraer	2–0	Elgin City	Stranraer
	Taggart (?); Symington (pen.)	Report		Stadium: Stair Park; Referee: B. Padden

=== Replay ===
8 January 1969	East Stirlingshire	2–1	Alloa	Falkirk
	Borland 26'; McGuire 60'	Report	Muir 35'	Stadium: Firs Park; Attendance: 1846; Referee: E. Pringle

== First round ==
25 January 1969	Aberdeen	3–0	Berwick Rangers	Aberdeen
	Forrest 36' (??); Robb (??)	Report		Stadium: Pittodrie Stadium; Attendance: 11,000 (estimated); Referee: R.D. Henderson

25 January 1969	Ayr United	1–0	Queen of the South	Ayr
	Ingram 22'	Report		Stadium: Somerset Park; Referee: S. Anderson

25 January 1969	Dumbarton	0–1	St Mirren	Dumbarton
	Blair 89'	Report		Stadium: Boghead Park; Attendance: 7,000 (estimated); Referee: T. Kellock

25 January 1969	Dundee	1–2	Hearts	Dundee
	Scott 7'	Report	G. Fleming 8'; Traynor 73'	Stadium: Dens Park; Referee: Tom Wharton

25 January 1969	Dundee United	2–1	Queen's Park	Dundee
	K Cameron 20' (pen.); Mitchell 53'	Report	Buchanan (?)	Stadium: Tannadice Park; Attendance: 4,000 (estimated); Referee: Bain

25 January 1969	East Stirlingshire	2–0	Stirling Albion	Falkirk
	Donnachie (?) (?)	Report		Stadium: Firs Park; Referee: McKee

25 January 1969	Falkirk	1–2	Greenock Morton	Falkirk
	Hunter 49'	Report	Bartram 53'; Markie 67' (o.g.)	Stadium: Brockville Park; Attendance: 5,000 (estimated); Referee: W. Anderson

25 January 1969	Kilmarnock	6–0	Glasgow University	Kilmarnock
	Queen 1' 53' 85'; McIlroy 33' 76'; Hope 69' (o.g.)	Report		Stadium: Rugby Park; Attendance: 15,000 (estimated); Referee: J.M. Kelly

25 January 1969	Montrose	1–0	Cowdenbeath
	Littlejohn 16'	Report		Attendance: 1,400; Referee: W. Balfour

25 January 1969	Motherwell	1–1	Clyde	Motherwell
	Deans 62'	Report	Quinn 31'	Stadium: Fir Park; Attendance: 10,000 (estimated); Referee: A.F.G. Webster

25 January 1969	Partick Thistle	3–3	Celtic	Glasgow
	Bone 60' 89'; Flanagan 71'	Report	Hughes 40'; Wallace 56'; Murdoch 63'	Stadium: Firhill Stadium; Attendance: 32,000 (estimated); Referee: Willie Syme

25 January 1969	Raith Rovers	0–2	Dunfermline Athletic	Kirkcaldy
		Report	Gardner 67'; Paton (?)	Stadium: Stark's Park; Attendance: 11,000 (estimated); Referee: J. Gardner

25 January 1969	Rangers	1–0	Hibernian	Glasgow
	Stein 66'	Report		Stadium: Ibrox Park; Referee: R.H. Davidson

25 January 1969	St Johnstone	3–2	Arbroath	Perth
	Aitken 26' 63' 70'	Report	Jack 55'; Wilkie (?)	Stadium: Muirton Park; Attendance: 6,500 (estimated); Referee: J.W. Paterson

25 January 1969	Stenhousemuir	0–3	Airdrieonians	Stenhousemuir
		Report	Whiteford 7'; Jarvie 45'; Goodwin (?)	Stadium: Ochilview Park; Referee: E. Thomson

25 January 1969	Stranraer	3–1	East Fife	Stranraer
	Symington (?) ? (?) ? (?)	Report	Dewar (?)	Stadium: Stair Park; Referee: B. Padden

=== Replays ===
28 January 1969	Clyde	2–1	Motherwell	Rutherglen
	Burns 38'; Anderson 91'	Report	Bryson 3'	Stadium: Shawfield Stadium; Referee: A. Webster

29 January 1969	Celtic	8–1	Partick Thistle	Glasgow
	McNeill 7'; Johnstone 10'; Wallace 23'; Callaghan 44' 62'; Lennox 52'; Hughes 55'; Gemmell 73'	Report	Gemmell 35' (o.g.)	Stadium: Celtic Park; Attendance: 48,000

== Second round ==
8 February 1969	Dundee United	6–2	Ayr United	Dundee
	Scott 12' 18'; K Cameron 20' 22' 51'; Wilson 28'	Report	Rough 18'; Malone 67' (pen.)	Stadium: Tannadice Park; Attendance: 7,500 (estimated); Referee: Foote

8 February 1969	Montrose	1–1	Kilmarnock	Montrose
	Welsh 5'	Report	Morrison 60'	Stadium: Links Park; Referee: R.C Greenlees

8 February 1969	Stranraer	1–3	Greenock Morton	Stranraer
	Coghill 90'	Report	Jensen (?); Bartram (?); Harper 85' (pen.)	Stadium: Stair Park; Attendance: 3,000 (estimated); Referee: T. Marshall

8 February 1969	East Stirlingshire	1–1	St Johnstone	Falkirk
	Hulston 61'	Report	Whitelaw 33'	Stadium: Firs Park; Attendance: 6,532 (estimated); Referee: E.H. Pringle

12 February 1969	Airdrieonians	1–1	St Mirren	Airdrie
	McPheat 79'	Report	Kane 30'	Stadium: Broomfield Park; Referee: Tiny Wharton

12 February 1969	Clyde	0–0	Celtic	Rutherglen
		Report		Stadium: Shawfield Stadium; Referee: W. Mullan

24 February 1969	Rangers	2–0	Hearts	Glasgow
	Johnston 33'; Persson 50'	Report		Stadium: Ibrox Park; Referee: J.W. Paterson

25 February 1969	Aberdeen	2–2	Dunfermline Athletic	Aberdeen
	Johnston 31'; Hamilton 47'	Report	Fraser 56'; Renton 88'	Stadium: Pittodrie Stadium; Attendance: 14,685; Referee: Willie Syme

=== Replays ===
12 February 1969	Kilmarnock	4–1	Montrose	Kilmarnock
	McLean 16' 45' (?); Morrison 3'	Report	Finn 70'	Stadium: Rugby Park; Attendance: 6,720; Referee: R.C Greenlees

24 February 1969	Celtic	3–0	Clyde	Glasgow
	Chalmers 24'; Hughes 75'; Murdoch 83'	Report		Stadium: Celtic Park; Referee: W. Mullan

24 February 1969	St Johnstone	3–0	East Stirlingshire	Perth
	Hall (?) (?) ? (?)	Report		Stadium: Muirton Park; Referee: E.H. Pringle

24 February 1969	St Mirren	1–3	Airdrieonians	Paisley
	Murray 54'	Report	Marshall 6' 77'; Goodwin 54'	Stadium: Love Street; Referee: Tiny Wharton

26 February 1969	Dunfermline Athletic	0–2	Aberdeen	Dunfermline
		Report	Robb 10' 76'	Stadium: East End Park; Attendance: 12,536; Referee: Willie Syme

== Quarter-finals ==
1 March 1969	Aberdeen	0–0	Kilmarnock	Aberdeen
		Report		Stadium: Pittodrie Stadium; Attendance: 21,000 (estimated); Referee: Tiny Wharton

1 March 1969	Celtic	3–2	St Johnstone	Glasgow
	Hughes 1'; Lennox 76'; Chalmers 79'	Report	Connolly 59'; Hall 85'	Stadium: Celtic Park; Referee: W. Anderson

1 March 1969	Dundee United	2–3	Greenock Morton	Dundee
	K Cameron 25' (pen.); Mitchell 29'	Report	Mason 14'; Bartram 31'; Harper 82'	Stadium: Tannadice Park; Referee: R.H. Davidson

1 March 1969	Rangers	1–0	Airdrieonians	Glasgow
	Greig 2' (pen.)	Report		Stadium: Ibrox Park; Attendance: 41,000 (estimated); Referee: Willie Syme

=== Replays ===
5 March 1969	Kilmarnock	0–3	Aberdeen	Kilmarnock
		Report	Robb 43'; Craig 67'; Hamilton 84'	Stadium: Rugby Park; Referee: Tiny Wharton

== Semi-finals ==
22 March 1969

Celtic	4–1	Greenock Morton

Hampden Park, Glasgow
Attendance: 48,394

22 March 1969

Rangers	6–1	Aberdeen
Andy Penman 14' 51'; Willie Henderson 39'; Willie Johnston 47' 72' 84'		Forrest 45'

Celtic Park, Glasgow
Attendance: 66,197
Referee: WJ Mullen

== Final ==
26 April 1969

Celtic	4–0	Rangers
Billy McNeill 3'; Bobby Lennox 44'; George Connelly 45'; Stevie Chalmers 76'

Hampden Park, Glasgow
Attendance: 132,896
Referee: Jim Callaghan

=== Teams ===
CELTIC:
GK	(Scotland) John Fallon
DF	(Scotland) Jim Craig
DF	(Scotland) Billy McNeill (c)
DF	(Scotland) Jim Brogan
DF	(Scotland) Tommy Gemmell
MF	(Scotland) George Connelly
MF	(Scotland) Bobby Murdoch
MF	(Scotland) Bertie Auld
MF	(Scotland) Bobby Lennox
FW	(Scotland) Stevie Chalmers
FW	(Scotland) Willie Wallace
Manager:
(Scotland) Jock Stein

RANGERS:
GK	(Scotland) Norrie Martin
DF	(Denmark) Kai Johansen
DF	(Scotland) John Greig (c)
DF	(Scotland) Ronnie McKinnon
DF	(Scotland) Willie Mathieson
MF	(Scotland) Willie Henderson
MF	(Scotland) Dave Smith
MF	(Scotland) Andy Penman
MF	(Sweden) Örjan Persson
FW	(Scotland) Willie Johnston
FW	(Scotland) Alex Ferguson
Manager:
(Scotland) David White

The attendance of 132,870 is the biggest ever for an Old Firm match.

== See also ==
- 1968–69 in Scottish football
- 1968–69 Scottish League Cup
