= 1974–75 Dundee United F.C. season =

Dundee United
1974–75 season
- Manager: Jim McLean
- Stadium: Tannadice Park
- Scottish First Division: 4th W19 D7 L8 F72 A43 P45
- Scottish Cup: 4th Round
- League Cup: Group stage
- European Cup Winners' Cup: 2nd Round

The 1974–75 season was the 66th year of football played by Dundee United, and covers the period from 1 July 1974 to 30 June 1975. United finished in fourth place in the First Division.

== Match results ==
Dundee United played a total of 47 competitive matches during the 1974–75 season.

=== Legend ===
Win
Draw
Loss

All results are written with Dundee United's score first. Own goals in italics

=== First Division ===
Date	Opponent	Venue	Result	Attendance	Scorers
31 August 1974	Motherwell	H	5–0	4,096	Gray (2), Gardner, Narey, Smith (penalty)
7 September 1974	St Johnstone	A	0–2	2,878	
14 September 1974	Dundee	H	3–0	10,857	Gray (2), Munro
21 September 1974	Hibernian	A	0–3	14,328	
28 September 1974	Dunfermline Athletic	H	1–0	4,292	Mackie
5 October 1974	Airdireonians	A	1–1	3,256	Gray
12 October 1974	Heart of Midlothian	H	5–0	7,424	Traynor (2), Houston, Gray
19 October 1974	Ayr United	A	1–1	3,152	Traynor
26 October 1974	Dumbarton	H	3–3	3,874	Gray
2 November 1974	Arbroath	A	3–1	3,011	Gray, Fleming
9 November 1974	Celtic	H	0–0	15,821	
16 November 1974	Partick Thistle	A	5–0	4,171	Rolland, Gray, Copland, Houston, Narey
27 November 1974	Aberdeen	H	4–0	7,415	Fleming (2), Narey, Williamson
30 November 1974	Rangers	A	2–4	27,630	Fleming, Jackson
7 December 1974	Clyde	H	3–3	3,981	Burns, Copland, Hegarty
14 December 1974	Greenock Morton	A	6–0	1,430	Gray (2), Hegarty (2), Narey, Kopel (penalty)
21 December 1974	Kilmarnock	H	3–4	4,415	Fleming, Copland, Traynor
28 December 1974	Motherwell	A	1–0	3,516	Gray
2 January 1975	St Johnstone	H	1–1	11,656	Narey
4 January 1975	Dundee	A	0–2	16,184	
11 January 1975	Hibernian	H	1–3	7,580	Narey
1 February 1975	Airdrieonians	H	1–0	4,239	Gray
8 February 1975	Heart of Midlothian	A	1–3	12,056	Gray
11 February 1975	Dunfermline Athletic	A	2–1	3,793	Gray, McDonald
1 March 1975	Dumbarton	A	2–1	2,919	McDonald (2)
5 March 1975	Ayr United	H	3–1	3,728	Houston, Rolland, McDonald
15 March 1975	Celtic	A	1–0	18,711	Gray
19 March 1975	Arbroath	H	3–1	3,889	Rolland, Hegarty, McDonald
22 March 1975	Partick Thistle	H	2–1	4,078	Forsyth (2 penalties)
29 March 1975	Aberdeen	A	0–2	8,792	
5 April 1975	Rangers	H	2–2	12,193	Sturrock (2)
12 April 1975	Clyde	A	2–1	1,180	Sturrock, Addison
19 April 1975	Greenock Morton	H	1–0	31,608	Sturrock
26 April 1975	Kilmarnock	A	4–2	7,589	Sturrock (2), Gray, McDonald

=== Scottish Cup ===
Date	Rd	Opponent	Venue	Result	Attendance	Scorers
4 February 1975	R3	Berwick Rangers	H	1–1	6,000	Gray
5 February 1975	R3 R	Berwick Rangers	A	1–0	2,068	Gray
19 February 1975	R4	Aberdeen	H	0–1	22,000	

=== League Cup ===
Date	Rd	Opponent	Venue	Result	Attendance	Scorers
10 August 1974	G4	Ayr United	H	3–1	3,254	Gray (2), Traynor
14 August 1974	G4	Motherwell	A	0–0	3,833	
17 August 1974	G4	Celtic	A	0–1	24,384	
21 August 1974	G4	Motherwell	H	1–0	4,750	Gray
24 August 1974	G4	Celtic	H	0–1	15,308	
28 August 1974	G4	Ayr United	A	2–2	2,503	Rolland, Gray

=== European Cup-Winners Cup ===
Date	Rd	Opponent	Venue	Result	Attendance	Scorers
18 September 1974	R1 1	(Romania) Jiul Petrosani	H	3–0	7,787	Narey, Copland, Gardner
2 October 1974	R1 2	(Romania) Jiul Petrosani	A	0–2	15,000	
23 October 1974	R2 1	(Turkey) Bursaspor	H	0–0	8,675	
6 November 1974	R2 2	(Turkey) Bursaspor	A	0–1	11,594	

== See also ==
- 1974–75 in Scottish football
