= 1970–71 Dundee United F.C. season =

Dundee United
1971–72 season
- Chairman: J. Johnston-Grant
- Manager: Jerry Kerr
- Stadium: Tannadice Park
- Scottish First Division: 6th W14 D8 L12 F53 A54 P36
- Scottish Cup: 4th Round
- League Cup: Group stage
- Inter-Cities Fairs Cup: 2nd Round

The 1970–71 season was the 62nd year of football played by Dundee United, and covers the period from 1 July 1970 to 30 June 1971. United finished in sixth place in the First Division.

== Match results ==
Dundee United played a total of 44 competitive matches during the 1970–71 season.

=== Legend ===
Win
Draw
Loss

All results are written with Dundee United's score first. Own goals in italics

=== First Division ===
Date	Opponent	Venue	Result	Attendance	Scorers
29 August 1970	Hibernian	H	1–1	8,781	D. Smith (penalty)
5 September 1970	St Johnstone	A	1–1	5,021	McManus
12 September 1970	Dundee	H	3–2	12,319	K. Cameron, Gordon, Gillespie
19 September 1970	Greenock Morton	A	0–3	3,506	
26 September 1970	Rangers	H	0–2	19,744	
3 October 1970	Clyde	A	2–1	1,408	Wilson, Gordon
10 October 1970	Airdrieonians	H	2–2	5,599	Gordon (2)
17 October 1970	Kilmarnock	A	1–2	3,644	Gordon
24 October 1970	Dunfermline Athletic	H	2–2	4,615	K. Cameron (2)
31 October 1970	Aberdeen	A	0–4	11,227	
7 November 1970	Ayr United	H	4–2	3,219	Gordon, Quinn, K. Cameron, D. Smith (penalty)
14 November 1970	Heart of Midlothian	A	0–1	8,286	
21 November 1970	Motherwell	H	2–2	4,700	Gordon (2)
28 November 1970	Cowdenbeath	A	2–0	1,615	Gordon, A. Reid
5 December 1970	Celtic	H	1–2	16,434	McNeill
12 December 1970	Falkirk	A	1–1	4,468	Traynor
19 December 1970	St Mirren	H	2–1	3,950	Stevenson (2)
26 December 1970	Hibernian	A	1–0	5,742	Copland
1 January 1971	St Johnstone	H	0–2	10,855	
9 January 1971	Greenock Morton	H	2–3	4,243	Devlin, Copland
16 January 1971	Rangers	A	1–1	27,776	A. Reid
6 February 1971	Airdrieonians	A	2–1	2,372	Gordon (2)
20 February 1971	Kilmarnock	H	3–2	3,852	Gordon (2), Henry
27 February 1971	Dunfermline Athletic	A	1–3	5,389	Devlin
10 March 1971	Aberdeen	H	0–2	6,178	
13 March 1971	Ayr United	A	0–1	5,602	
20 March 1971	Heart of Midlothian	H	4–1	4,106	A. Reid (2), Gordon, K. Cameron
27 March 1971	Motherwell	A	2–1	2,778	K. Cameron, Wilson
3 April 1971	Cowdenbeath	H	4–2	2,396	K. Cameron (3), D. Smith (penalty)
5 April 1971	Dundee	A	3–2	11,590	K. Cameron, Gordon, A. Reid
10 April 1971	Celtic	A	1–1	28,894	Rolland
14 April 1971	Clyde	H	1–0	3,584	D. Smith (penalty)
17 April 1971	Falkirk	H	3–1	4,172	K. Cameron, A. Reid, D. Smith (penalty)
24 April 1971	St Mirren	A	1–2	5,746	Gordon

=== Scottish Cup ===
Date	Rd	Opponent	Venue	Result	Attendance	Scorers
23 January 1971	R3	Clydebank	A	0–0	4,967	
27 January 1971	R3 R	Clydebank	H	5–1	5,831	Henry (2), Gordon, Wilson, A. Reid
13 February 1971	R4	Aberdeen	H	1–1	23,494	D. Smith (penalty)
17 February 1971	R4 R	Aberdeen	A	0–2	28,980	

=== League Cup ===
Date	Rd	Opponent	Venue	Result	Attendance	Scorers
8 August 1970	G4	Clyde	A	1–1	1,738	Wilson
12 August 1970	G4	Heart of Midlothian	H	2–1	7,245	I. Reid, Wilson
15 August 1970	G4	Celtic	A	2–2	37,622	I. Reid, Gordon
19 August 1970	G4	Heart of Midlothian	A	0–0	7,088	
22 August 1970	G4	Clyde	H	1–1	4,930	Henry
26 August 1970	G4	Celtic	H	2–2	11,539	Wilson, Gordon

=== Inter-Cities Fairs Cup ===
Date	Rd	Opponent	Venue	Result	Attendance	Scorers
15 September 1970	R1 1	(Switzerland) Grasshoppers	H	3–2	8,400	I. Reid, Markland, A. Reid
30 September 1970	R1 2	(Switzerland) Grasshoppers	A	0–0	4,500	
21 October 1970	R2 1	(Czechoslovakia) Sparta Prague	A	1–3	17,600	Traynor
4 November 1970	R2 2	(Czechoslovakia) Sparta Prague	H	1–0	9,000	Gordon

== See also ==
- 1970–71 in Scottish football
