= 1975–76 Dundee United F.C. season =

Dundee United
1975–76 season
- Manager: Jim McLean
- Stadium: Tannadice Park
- Scottish Premier Division: 8th 36G 32P 12W 8D 16L 46GF 48GA
- Scottish Cup: 4th Round
- League Cup: Group stage
- UEFA Cup: 2nd Round

The 1975–76 season was the 67th year of football played by Dundee United, and covers the period from 1 July 1975 to 30 June 1976. United finished in eighth place in the new Premier Division escaping relegation to the First Division.

== Match results ==
Dundee United played a total of 49 competitive matches during the 1975–76 season.

=== Legend ===
Win
Draw
Loss

All results are written with Dundee United's score first. Own goals in italics

=== Premier Division ===
Date	Opponent	Venue	Result	Attendance	Scorers
30 August 1975	St Johnstone	A	0–1	3,340	
6 September 1975	Hibernian	H	1–0	7,069	Payne (penalty)
13 September 1975	Aberdeen	A	3–1	6,214	Sturrock, Hegarty, Copland
20 September 1975	Motherwell	H	1–1	4,878	Sturrock
27 September 1975	Celtic	A	1–2	19,986	Payne (penalty)
4 October 1975	Ayr United	H	3–2	3,458	Hall, Addison, Houston
11 October 1975	Heart of Midlothian	A	0–1	8,298	
18 October 1975	Dundee	H	1–2	11,327	Houston
1 November 1975	St Johnstone	H	3–1	4,840	McAdam (2), Hegarty
8 November 1975	Hibernian	A	1–1	10,633	McAdam
12 November 1975	Rangers	H	1–4	11,555	Sturrock
15 November 1975	Aberdeen	H	1–2	4,704	Hegarty
22 November 1975	Motherwell	A	1–2	6,306	McAdam
29 November 1975	Celtic	H	1–3	11,846	Hegarty
6 December 1975	Ayr United	A	2–2	4,764	Hall, McAdam
13 December 1975	Heart of Midlothian	H	0–1	4,865	
20 December 1975	Dundee	A	0–0	9,957	
27 December 1975	Rangers	H	0–0	13,011	
1 January 1976	St Johnstone	A	1–1	4,825	Rolland
10 January 1976	Aberdeen	A	3–5	10,563	Reid (2 including 1 penalty), Hegarty
17 January 1976	Motherwell	H	1–4	5,395	Copland
31 January 1976	Celtic	A	1–2	17,007	Hall
21 February 1976	Heart of Midlothian	A	1–0	6,383	Hall
28 February 1976	Dundee	H	1–0	10,199	McAdam
3 March 1976	Ayr United	H	5–0	4,355	McAdam (3), Reid, Hegarty
20 March 1976	Hibernian	A	1–0	6,720	Hall
27 March 1976	Aberdeen	H	1–0	4,905	Fleming
31 March 1976	St Johnstone	H	1–1	3,601	Hegarty
3 April 1976	Motherwell	A	2–3	3,829	Fleming, Hall
10 April 1976	Celtic	H	3–2	4,907	McAdam (2), Fleming
14 April 1976	Ayr United	A	0–1	5,309	
17 April 1976	Heart of Midlothian	H	2–0	6,598	Hegarty, McAdam
21 April 1976	Dundee	A	1–2	13,768	Hall
24 April 1976	Rangers	H	0–1	16,607	
28 April 1976	Hibernian	H	2–0	6,130	McAlpine (penalty), Hall
4 May 1976	Rangers	A	0–0	40,322	

=== Scottish Cup ===
Date	Rd	Opponent	Venue	Result	Attendance	Scorers
24 January 1976	R3	Hamilton Academical	H	4–0	3,136	McAdam, Hall, Payne, Hegarty
14 February 1976	R4	Hibernian	A	1–1	13,682	Hall
25 February 1976	R4 R	Hibernian	H	0–2	13,000	

=== League Cup ===
Date	Rd	Opponent	Venue	Result	Attendance	Scorers
9 August 1975	G4	St Johnstone	H	2–1	5,124	Sturrock, Steele
13 August 1975	G4	Partick Thistle	A	1–3	4,410	Steele
16 August 1975	G4	Kilmarnock	H	2–0	4,050	Gray (2)
20 August 1975	G4	Partick Thistle	H	1–2	4,677	Steele (penalty)
23 August 1975	G4	Kilmarnock	A	0–1	2,795	
27 August 1975	G4	St Johnstone	A	2–1	1,783	Narey, Hall

=== UEFA Cup ===
Date	Rd	Opponent	Venue	Result	Attendance	Scorers
23 September 1975	R1 1	(Iceland) IBK Keflavik	A	2–0	3,500	Narey (2)
30 September 1975	R1 2	(Iceland) IBK Keflavik	H	4–0	4,500	Hall (2), Hegarty (penalty), Sturrock
22 October 1975	R2 1	(Portugal) FC Porto	H	1–2	6,500	Rennie
5 November 1975	R2 2	(Portugal) FC Porto	A	1–1	23,117	Hegarty

== League table ==
Pos	Team	Pld	W	D	L	GF	GA	GD	Pts	Qualification or relegation
6	Ayr United	36	14	5	17	46	59	−13	33	
7	Aberdeen	36	11	10	15	49	50	−1	32	
8	Dundee United	36	12	8	16	46	48	−2	32	
9	Dundee (R)	36	11	10	15	49	62	−13	32	Relegation to the 1976–77 Scottish First Division
10	St Johnstone (R)	36	3	5	28	29	79	−50	11	Relegation to the 1976–77 Scottish First Division

Source: Statto
Rules for classification: 1) points; 2) goal difference; 3) number of goals scored.
(R) Relegated

== See also ==
- 1975–76 in Scottish football
