= List of St Johnstone F.C. players =

This is a list of notable footballers who have played for Scottish club St Johnstone. Generally, this refers to players who have played 100 or more league matches for the club. Those listed who do not meet this criterion either represented their nation while at the club or are considered to have made significant contributions to the club's history.

== Notable players ==
Key:

- GK — Goalkeeper
- DF — Defender
- MF — Midfielder
- W — Winger
- FW — Forward
Players who represented their country while at the club.
Club record holder.

Bold type indicates that the player currently plays for the club.

As of 09:45, 14 February 2021 (UTC)

Name	Nationality	Position^{[note]}	Saints career	League games	League goals	Notes
Kenny Aird	Scotland	W	1967–73	161	32	
Fred Aitken	Scotland	W	1966–75	181	35	
Steven Anderson	Scotland	DF	2004–2020	**364**	15	
Jimmy Argue	Scotland	DF	1968–75	145	3	
John Balavage	Scotland	GK	1984–90	185	0	
Doug Barron	Scotland	DF	1980–92	261	7	
Jim Blyth	Scotland	DF	1946–52	132	1	
Drew Brannigan	Scotland	FW	1978–85	161	32	
John Brogan	Scotland	FW	1976–84	244	**114**	^{[note 1]}
Paddy Buckley	Scotland	FW	1948–52	100	73	
Alex Caldwell	Scotland	DF	1980–85	138	8	
Joe Carr	Scotland	W	1953–62	182	58	
Jimmy Caskie	Scotland	W	1933–39	102	13	(Note: Played for the Scottish Football League XI while at the club.)
Paul Cherry	England	DF	1988–96	213	12	
**Zander Clark**	Scotland	GK	2011–present	131	0	
Willie Coburn	Scotland	DF	1962–72	238	12	
John Connolly	Scotland	W	1968–72	96	41	
Paddy Connolly	Scotland	FW	1998–04	109	12	
**Liam Craig**	Scotland	MF	2007–13; 2015–present	357	51	
Harry Curran	Scotland	MF	1989–95	204	35	
Kevin Cuthbert	Scotland	GK	2001–08	110	0	
Nick Dasovic	Canada	MF	1996–02	137	1	
Bobby Davidson	Scotland	FW	1933–35	58	28	
Callum Davidson	Scotland	DF	1994–98; 2011–13	90	5	^{[note 3]}
**Murray Davidson**	Scotland	MF	2009–present	315	33	
John Davies	Scotland	MF	1990–94	134	10	
Percy Dickie	Scotland	MF	1932–37	143	15	
Rachid Djebaili	Algeria	FW	2001–02	13	0	
Billy Dodds	Scotland	FW	1994	20	6	^{[note 4]}
Darren Dods	Scotland	DF	1998–04	168	11	
Jim Donaldson	Scotland	GK	1966–74	188	0	
Brian Easton	Scotland	DF	2013–19	134	1	
Ernie Ewen	Scotland	FW	1953–59	183	40	
Harry Ferguson	Scotland	MF	1925–37	258	61	
Ian Gibson	Scotland	MF	1983–87	138	10	
Alex Gordon	Scotland	MF	1967–72	148	3	
Roddy Grant	Scotland	FW	1988–00	242	66	
Danny Griffin	Northern Ireland	DF	1994–00	124	4	
Henry Hall	Scotland	FW	1968–75	187	85	
Ian Heddle	Scotland	MF	1987–91	138	18	
Willie Imrie	Scotland	MF	1927–29	72	7	
John Inglis	Scotland	DF	1990–94	140	2	
Sammy Johnston	Scotland	MF	1984–90	176	29	
**Chris Kane**	Scotland	FW	2013–present	155	21	
Paul Kane	Scotland	MF	1997–02	138	6	
Bobby Kemp	Scotland	W	1961–67	132	36	
**Jason Kerr**	Scotland	DF	2017–present	102	4	
Rab Kilgour	Scotland	DF	1980–85	146	3	
Jim Lachlan	Scotland	DF	1959–64	127	1	
John Lambie	Scotland	DF	1969–74	103	4	
Jimmy Lindsay	Scotland	MF	1947–52	117	5	
Ian MacDonald	Scotland	DF	1972–76	108	2	
Peter MacDonald	Scotland	FW	2001–11	201	42	
Dave Mackay	Scotland	DF	2009–16	223	13	
John Mackay	Scotland	DF	1976–84	155	3	
Steven MacLean	Scotland	FW	2012–18	171	47	
Alan Main	Scotland	GK	1995–10	308	0	^{[note 2]}
Alan Mannus	Northern Ireland	GK	2011–18	192	0	
Steve Maskrey	Scotland	FW	1987–94	174	40	
Ian Maxwell	Scotland	DF	2002–05	100	5	
**Stevie May**	Scotland	FW	2009–14; 2019–present	111	34	
Laurie McBain	Scotland	FW	1927–33	105	16	
**Ali McCann**	Northern Ireland	MF	2017–present	60	6	
Bill McCarry	Scotland	DF	1963–71	224	23	
Stuart McCluskey	Scotland	DF	1994–03	102	3	
Charlie McFadyen	Scotland	DF	1955–65	262	3	
Gary McGinnis	Scotland	DF	1990–95	137	1	
Kevin McGowne	Scotland	DF	1992–96	122	3	
Ron McKinven	Scotland	DF	1959–66	206	11	
Sandy McLaren	Scotland	GK	1927–33	198	0	
Tom McNeil	Scotland	DF	1992–96	137	12	
Ian McPhee	Scotland	FW	1965–72	177	18	
John McQuillan	Scotland	DF	1995–00	137	5	
Don McVicar	Scotland	DF	1981–91	239	11	
Chris Millar	Scotland	MF	2008–18	273	6	
Colin Miller	Canada	DF	1993–94	24	0	
George Miller	Scotland	WH	1965-70	68	0	
Steven Milne	Scotland	FW	2005–11	122	38	
Allan Moore	Scotland	W	1989–94	124	23	
Jody Morris	England	MF	2008–12	104	4	
Jim Morton	Scotland	MF	1979–86	205	47	
John Muir	Scotland	FW	1969–76	134	37	
George O'Boyle	Northern Ireland	FW	1994–01	146	64	
**Michael O'Halloran**	Scotland	FW	2014–16; 2017–18; 2019–present	145	21	
John O'Neil	Scotland	MF	1994–00	186	22	
Keigan Parker	Scotland	FW	1999–04	101	20	
Jim Pearson	Scotland	FW	1970–74	105	40	
John Pelosi	Scotland	W	1977–83	156	26	
Allan Preston	Scotland	MF	1994–00	144	7	
Alex Rennie	Scotland	DF	1967–75	197	7	
Andy Rhodes	England	GK	1992–95	107	0	
Derek Robertson	Scotland	GK	1967–79	220	0	
Ian Rodger	Scotland	FW	1954–58	135	93	
Benny Rooney	Scotland	MF	1966–73	222	12	
Drew Rutherford	Scotland	DF	1977–85	300	18	
Collin Samuel	Trinidad and Tobago	W	2008–11	83	13	
Tam Scobbie	Scotland	DF	2012–17	105	2	
Jason Scotland	Trinidad and Tobago	FW	2005–07	66	33	
Philip Scott	Scotland	MF	1992–99	134	27	
Joe Shaughnessy	Republic of Ireland	DF	2015–19	146	6	
Paul Sheerin	Scotland	MF	2004–10	187	32	
Gordon Smith	Scotland	DF	1972–76	112	8	
Goran Stanić	North Macedonia	DF	2005–08	100	1	
Willie Steel	Scotland	DF	1926–31	162	0	
Andy Swallow	Scotland	MF	1924–30	179	6	
**Scott Tanser**	England	DF	2017–present	112	5	
Bill Taylor	Scotland	GK	1958–64	178	0	
Bobby Thomson	Scotland	MF	1973–78	118	17	
Joe Toner	Ireland	W	1926–27	29	2	
Mark Treanor	Scotland	DF	1989–93	105	11	
George Tulloch	Scotland	GK	1979–83	107	0	
Tommy Turner	Scotland	MF	1990–95	139	7	
Jim Weir	Scotland	DF	1994–07	205	7	
John Weir	Scotland	MF	1978–82	106	3	
Gordon Whitelaw	Scotland	FW	1964–73	163	49	
Jimmy Woodcock	Scotland	DF	1951–58	144	0	
**David Wotherspoon**	Canada	MF	2013–present	253	23	
Frazer Wright	Scotland	DF	2011–15	108	2	
Paul Wright	Scotland	FW	1991–95	112	40	

== Notes ==
- ^1. John Brogan holds the club record of most league goals.
- ^2. Alan Main holds the club record of most league appearances.
- ^3. Callum Davidson holds the club record for the largest transfer fee received by the club.
- ^4. Billy Dodds holds the club record for the largest transfer fee paid by the club.
