= 1974 Scottish Cup final =

1974 Scottish Cup Final
- Event: 1973–74 Scottish Cup
Celtic	Dundee United
3	0
- Date: 4 May 1974
- Venue: Hampden Park, Glasgow
- Referee: J.W. Paterson
- Attendance: 75,959

The 1974 Scottish Cup Final was played on 4 May 1974 at Hampden Park in Glasgow and was the final of the 89th Scottish Cup. Celtic and Dundee United contested the match, Celtic won the match 3–0 with goals from Harry Hood, Steve Murray and Dixie Deans.

The game was Celtic's sixth successive appearance in the final, and Dundee United's first cup final appearance. It was Celtic's 23rd Scottish cup.

In a poor game Celtic rarely looked troubled by the young Dundee United team who appeared nervous in their first cup final appearance. Though United's Doug Houston put a couple of early chances wide, after that Celtic had the bulk of the play and once Harry Hood scored in the 20th minute the result never looked in doubt.

== Final ==
4 May 1974

Celtic	3 – 0	Dundee United
Dixie Deans; Harry Hood; Steve Murray

Hampden Park, Glasgow
Attendance: 75,959
Referee: J.W. Paterson

=== Teams ===
CELTIC:
GK	(Scotland) Denis Connaghan
DF	(Scotland) Danny McGrain	(substituted off) ?'
DF	(Scotland) Billy McNeill (c)
DF	(Scotland) Pat McCluskey
DF	(Scotland) Jim Brogan
MF	(Scotland) Jimmy Johnstone
MF	(Scotland) Steve Murray 25'
MF	(Scotland) David Hay
MF	(Scotland) Kenny Dalglish
FW	(Scotland) Harry Hood 20'
FW	(Scotland) Dixie Deans 89'
Substitutes:
MF	(Scotland) Tommy Callaghan	(substituted on) ?'
?
Manager:
(Scotland) Jock Stein

DUNDEE UNITED:
GK	(Scotland) Sandy Davie
DF	(Scotland) Walter Smith
DF	(Scotland) Jackie Copland
DF	(Scotland) Doug Smith(c)	(substituted off) ?'
DF	(Scotland) Frank Kopel
MF	(Scotland) Pat Gardner
MF	(Scotland) Archie Knox
MF	(Scotland) George Fleming
MF	(Scotland) Doug Houston
MF	(Scotland) Graeme Payne	(substituted off) ?'
FW	(Scotland) Andy Gray
Substitutes:
MF	(Scotland) Tommy Traynor	(substituted on) ?'
DF	(Scotland) Andy Rolland	(substituted on) ?'
Manager:
(Scotland) Jim McLean
