= 1969–70 Dundee United F.C. season =

Dundee United
1969–70 season
- Chairman: J. Johnston-Grant
- Manager: Jerry Kerr
- Stadium: Tannadice Park
- Scottish First Division: 5th W16 D6 L12 F62 A64 P38
- Scottish Cup: 2nd Round
- League Cup: Group stage
- Inter-Cities Fairs Cup: 1st Round

The 1969–70 season was the 61st year of football played by Dundee United, and covers the period from 1 July 1969 to 30 June 1970. United finished in fifth place in the First Division.

== Match results ==
Dundee United played a total of 44 competitive matches during the 1969–70 season.

=== Legend ===
Win
Draw
Loss

All results are written with Dundee United's score first. Own goals in italics

=== First Division ===
Date	Opponent	Venue	Result	Attendance	Scorers
30 August 1969	Rangers	H	0–0	20,221	
3 September 1969	Clyde	A	2–2	1,154	Markland, K. Cameron
6 September 1969	Greenock Morton	A	0–6	4,701	
13 September 1969	Airdrieonians	H	5–2	4,489	Gillespie, Delaney, K. Cameron, Wilson, Scott
20 September 1969	Dundee	A	2–1	11,888	Gordon, Gillespie
27 September 1969	St Johnstone	H	1–0	11,847	Gordon
4 October 1969	Motherwell	A	2–0	7,030	Scott, Gordon
11 October 1969	Ayr United	H	3–1	6,757	Gordon (2), Scott
25 October 1969	St Mirren	H	3–1	5,754	Gordon (2), A. Reid
1 November 1969	Partick Thistle	H	1–0	4,745	Mitchell
8 November 1969	Aberdeen	A	0–0	9,314	
15 November 1969	Hibernian	H	0–1	10,623	
22 November 1969	Raith Rovers	A	1–0	2,171	Wilson
6 December 1969	Kilmarnock	H	2–2	5,639	Gordon, Mitchell
10 December 1969	Dunfermline Athletic	A	3–2	6,592	Rolland (2), Callaghan
13 December 1969	Rangers	A	1–2	40,718	Gordon
17 December 1969	Celtic	A	2–7	23,916	Mitchell (penalty), Gordon
27 December 1969	Heart of Midlothian	A	2–2	11,253	Mitchell, Gordon
1 January 1970	St Johnstone	A	0–1	8,405	
3 January 1970	Dundee	H	4–1	16,891	K. Cameron (2), Easton, Wilson
10 January 1970	Heart of Midlothian	H	2–3	8,159	Henry, Mitchell
17 January 1970	Airdrieonians	A	3–6	1,466	Mitchell (3)
31 January 1970	Greenock Morton	H	5–4	5,699	Mitchell (2), Wilson, D. Smith, Murray
11 February 1970	Kilmarnock	A	1–3	4,647	Mitchell
25 February 1970	Motherwell	H	0–0	4,427	
28 February 1970	Ayr United	A	3–2	5,538	Scott, Mitchell, K. Cameron
7 March 1970	Celtic	H	0–2	19,532	
11 March 1970	Clyde	H	3–1	2,850	Mitchell (2), K. Cameron
14 March 1970	St Mirren	A	1–3	4,102	K. Cameron
21 March 1970	Partick Thistle	A	3–2	3,504	Wilson (2)
28 March 1970	Aberdeen	H	2–0	7,775	Mitchell, K. Cameron
4 April 1970	Hibernian	A	1–3	5,051	Stevenson
18 April 1970	Raith Rovers	H	4–2	3,457	Mitchell (3), Henry
22 April 1970	Dunfermline Athletic	H	1–3	2,727	Scott

=== Scottish Cup ===
Date	Rd	Opponent	Venue	Result	Attendance	Scorers
24 January 1970	R1	Ayr United	H	1–0	7,000	Mitchell (penalty)
7 February 1970	R2	Celtic	H	0–4	45,000	

=== League Cup ===
Date	Rd	Opponent	Venue	Result	Attendance	Scorers
9 August 1969	G4	Heart of Midlothian	H	2–3	9,537	Mitchell, Stuart
13 August 1969	G4	Greenock Morton	A	1–4	7,245	Scott
16 August 1969	G4	St Mirren	A	1–0	6,363	K. Cameron
20 August 1969	G4	Greenock Morton	H	0–2	6,985	
23 August 1969	G4	Heart of Midlothian	A	0–1	6,000	
27 August 1969	G4	St Mirren	H	2–1	3,057	A. Reid, Rolland

=== Inter-Cities Fairs Cup ===
Date	Rd	Opponent	Venue	Result	Attendance	Scorers
15 September 1969	R1 1	(England) Newcastle United	H	1–2	21,000	Scott
1 October 1969	R1 2	(England) Newcastle United	A	0–1	37,470	

== See also ==
- 1969–70 in Scottish football
