= List of Dundee United F.C. records and statistics =

This page details Dundee United records.

== Player records ==
=== Appearances ===
- Most international appearances: Maurice Malpas (55 for Scotland)
- Most League appearances: Maurice Malpas (617, 1981–2000)
- Youngest player: Chris Mochrie, aged 16 years and 27 days (against Greenock Morton in the Scottish Championship on 4 May 2019)
- Oldest player: Jimmy Brownlie, aged 40 years and eight months (against Hearts at Tynecastle in February 1926, as an emergency goalkeeper)

==== All-time appearances ====
As of 1 January 2007 (Competitive matches only, includes appearances as substitute):

	Name	Games	Goals
1	Dave Narey	865	35
2	Maurice Malpas	826	26
3	Paul Hegarty	704	83
4	Hamish McAlpine	677	3
5	Doug Smith	604	26
6	Paul Sturrock	571	170
7	Dennis Gillespie	454	114
8	Eamonn Bannon	440	108
9	Andy Rolland	429	37
10	Dave Bowman	424	12
11	John Holt	403	24
12	Billy Kirkwood	394	69
12	Frank Kopel	394	9
14	Jim McInally	391	22
15	Jimmy Briggs	385	31
16	Davie Dodds	356	150
17	John Clark	327	37
18	George Fleming	326	36
19	Ian Mitchell	301	127
20	Graeme Payne	288	20
21	Ralph Milne	286	73

=== Goalscorers ===
- Most League goals: Peter McKay (158 during 1947–1954)
- Most League goals in one season: Johnny Coyle (43 in 1955–56)
- Youngest scorer: David Goodwillie, aged 16 years and 11 months (against Hibernian)

==== All-time goalscorers ====
As of 1 January 2007 (Competitive matches only, includes appearances as substitute):

	Name	Goals	Games	Average
1	Peter McKay	201	-	-
2	Paul Sturrock	170	571	0.30
3	Davie Dodds	150	356	0.45
4	Ian Mitchell	127	301	0.42
5	Dennis Gillespie	114	454	0.25
6	Eamonn Bannon	108	440	0.25
7	Arthur Milne	85	81	1.05
8	Paul Hegarty	83	704	0.12
9	Collie Martin	80	92	0.87
10	Finn Dossing	76	115	0.66

== Club records ==
=== Scores ===
- Biggest win: 14–0 v Nithsdale Wanderers, Scottish Cup 1st Round, 17 January 1931
- Biggest league win: 12–1 v East Stirlingshire, Scottish Football League Division Two, 13 April 1936
- Worst defeat: 1–12 v Motherwell, Scottish Football League Division Two, 23 January 1954

=== Goals ===
- Most league goals: 108 during 1935–36 in Division Two (3.2 per match)
- Fewest league goals: 21 during 1911–12 in Division Two (0.95 per match)
- Fastest goals: Finn Dossing, after 14 seconds into the Division One match against Hamilton Academical at Tannadice on 16 October 1965 and Johnny Russell, also after 14 seconds in a Scottish Cup tie against Rangers at Tannadice on 2 February 2013.
- Most goals in one match: Albert Juliussen, with six of United's seven in a North Eastern League Cup match against St Bernard's on 15 November 1941
- Several players have scored five:
  - Collie Martin in a Scottish Football League Division Two match in December 1914
  - Tim Williamson in a Scottish Cup match in January 1931
  - Willie Ouchterlonie in Division Two matches in November and December 1933
  - Willie Black in the same competition in March 1939
  - Paul Sturrock scored all five in a 5–0 Premier Division win against Morton in November 1984.

=== Wins ===
- Most consecutive wins: 11 during the last 6 matches of 1982–83 and the first five of the 1983–84
- Most league wins in a season: 24 from 36 games (1928–29 and 1982–83)

=== Attendances ===
- Highest home attendance: 28,000 v CF Barcelona, European Fairs Cup 2nd Round 2nd Leg, 16 November 1966
- Largest crowd involving Dundee United: 100,000+ against Selangor for the formal opening of the Shah Alam Stadium, Selangor, Malaysia, in July 1994

=== Transfers ===
Record transfers as of 1 August 2008 (figures based on press reports). Where some records have been equalled, only the first instance is shown.

==== Bought ====
The current record signing is former Scotland international Steven Pressley, who was signed from Coventry City in July 1995 for £750,000.

Year	Player	From	Fee	2006
1959	(Scotland) Dennis Gillespie	(Scotland) Alloa	£3,000	£48,390
1968	(Scotland) Kenny Cameron	(Scotland) Kilmarnock	£10,000	£125,200
1974	(Scotland) Paul Hegarty	(Scotland) Hamilton Academical	£27,500	£229,075
1975	(Scotland) Tom McAdam	(Scotland) Dumbarton	£40,000	£287,200
1977	(Scotland) John Bourke	(Scotland) Dumbarton	£60,000	£297,600
1979	(Scotland) Willie Pettigrew	(Scotland) Motherwell	£100,000	£395,000
1979	(Scotland) Eamonn Bannon	(England) Chelsea	£165,000	£651,750
1988	(Socialist Federal Republic of Yugoslavia) Miodrag Krivokapić	(Socialist Federal Republic of Yugoslavia) Red Star	£200,000	£386,000
1989	(Northern Ireland) Michael O'Neill	(England) Newcastle United	£350,000	£644,000
1993	(Serbia) Gordan Petric	(Netherlands) Partizan	£600,000	£852,000
1995	(Scotland) Steven Pressley	(Scotland) Coventry City	£750,000	£1,027,500

Source: https://web.archive.org/web/20081208045249/http://www.dundeeunitedfc.co.uk/index.asp?pg=302

==== Sold ====
The current record sale is former Scotland international Duncan Ferguson, who was sold to Rangers in July 1993 for £4,000,000.

Year	Player	To	Fee	2013
1925	(Scotland) Jimmy Howieson	(Scotland) St Mirren	£1,000	£51,456
1927	(Scotland) Jimmy Simpson	(Scotland) Rangers	£1,250	£66,437
1929	(Scotland) Duncan Hutchison	(England) Newcastle United	£4,050	£218,135
1957	(Scotland) Johnny Coyle	(Scotland) Clyde	£8,000	£163,430
1961	(Scotland) Ron Yeats	(England) Liverpool	£30,000	£566,352
1970	(Scotland) Ian Mitchell	(England) Newcastle United	£50,000	£655,420
1975	(Scotland) Andy Gray	(England) Aston Villa	£100,000	£711,120
1979	(Scotland) Ray Stewart	(England) West Ham United	£400,000	£1,716,840
1986	(Scotland) Richard Gough	(England) Tottenham Hotspur	£750,000	£1,863,075
1990	(Scotland) Kevin Gallacher	(Scotland) Coventry City	£950,000	£1,829,035
1993	(Scotland) Duncan Ferguson	(Scotland) Rangers	£4,000,000	£6,902,000

Source: https://web.archive.org/web/20081208045249/http://www.dundeeunitedfc.co.uk/index.asp?pg=302
