= 1969 Scottish League Cup final (October) =

- Event: 1969–70 Scottish League Cup
St Johnstone	Celtic
0	1
- Date: 25 October 1969
- Venue: Hampden Park, Glasgow
- Attendance: 73,067

The 1969–70 Scottish League Cup final was played on 25 October 1969 at Hampden Park in Glasgow and was the final of the 24th Scottish League Cup competition. The final was contested by St Johnstone, who were contesting their first major national cup final, and cup holders Celtic. Celtic retained the cup for another year by winning the match 1–0, with Bertie Auld scoring the only goal.

== Match details ==
25 October 1969

St Johnstone	0–1	Celtic
	Report	Auld

Hampden Park, Glasgow
Attendance: 73,067
Referee: J Paterson

ST JOHNSTONE:
GK	Jim Donaldson
FB	John Lambie
FB	Willie Coburn
RH	Alex Gordon
CH	Benny Rooney (c)
LH	Ian McPhee
RW	Kenny Aird
IF	Henry Hall
CF	Bill McCarry	(substituted off) 45'
IF	John Connolly
LW	Fred Aitken
Substitutes:
FW	Gordon Whitelaw	(substituted on) 45'
Manager:
Willie Ormond

CELTIC:
GK	John Fallon
FB	Jim Craig
FB	Davie Hay
RH	Bobby Murdoch
CH	Billy McNeill (c)
LH	Jim Brogan
RW	Tommy Callaghan
IF	Harry Hood
CF	John Hughes
IF	Stevie Chalmers	(substituted off) 45'
LW	Bertie Auld
Substitutes:
RW	Jimmy Johnstone	(substituted on) 45'
Manager:
Jock Stein
