= Jim Cameron (Scottish footballer) =

Scottish footballer (born 1946)

Personal information
- Full name: James Fairley Cameron
- Date of birth: 7 December 1946 (age 79)
- Position: Left back

Senior career*
Years	Team	Apps	(Gls)
–1966	Ashfield		
1966–1973	Dundee United	159	(1)
1967	→ Dallas Tornado (loan)	10	(0)
1973–1977	Falkirk	101	(2)
1977–1978	Montrose	28	(0)
1978–1981	Forfar Athletic	73	(0)
Total		371	(3)
- * Club domestic league appearances and goals

James Fairley Cameron (born 7 December 1946) is a Scottish former professional footballer, who played as a left back in the Scottish Football League. He made over 200 appearances for Dundee United, and also played for Falkirk, Forfar Athletic and Montrose.

== Playing career ==
Jim Cameron joined Dundee United in October 1966 from Ashfield, having turned down contract offers from Leicester City and Stirling Albion, and was one of three players from the Glasgow-based junior club signed by United manager Jerry Kerr around that time. (Note: The other players were Gerry Hernon, and future Rangers and Scotland manager Walter Smith.) After performing well in the reserve team, he made his first team debut in the Scottish Football League in April 1967, in a 2–2 draw against Partick Thistle at Tannadice Park. The following month Dundee United travelled to the United States, to represent the Dallas Tornado franchise in the new United Soccer Association (USA) league. (Note: For this attempt to relaunch professional soccer in North America, all franchises were represented by club teams imported from Europe and South America.) With regular left back Jimmy Briggs initially left out due to a contract dispute, Cameron was included in the squad and featured regularly on the tour, playing in ten of the twelve USA matches. (Note: Briggs rejoined the squad before the end of the tour after signing a new contract, and began the following Scottish season in the United team.)

Returning to Scotland, Cameron began the 1967–68 season in the reserves until Briggs suffered a broken leg in February 1968. This gave Cameron his opportunity in the first team, and he rarely missed a match over the next four years. In December 1971, Jim McLean replaced Kerr as Dundee United manager and made a new left back, Frank Kopel, his first signing. By the beginning of the 1972–73 season, Kopel had replaced Cameron as first choice in the position. Cameron was transfer listed in October 1972 but didn't leave the club until September 1973 when he was transferred to Falkirk for a £7000 fee. He made a total of 208 competitive appearances for Dundee United, scoring his only goal in a 3–2 win over Dunfermline Athletic on Christmas Day 1971.

Cameron went on to play over 100 games for Falkirk, and also had spells with Montrose and Forfar Athletic before emigrating to Australia in 1981.
