= 1968–69 Dundee United F.C. season =

Dundee United
1968–69 season
- Chairman: J. Johnston-Grant
- Manager: Jerry Kerr
- Stadium: Tannadice Park
- Scottish First Division: 5th W17 D9 L8 F61 A49 P43
- Scottish Cup: 3rd Round
- League Cup: Group stage

The 1968–69 season was the 60th year of football played by Dundee United, and covers the period from 1 July 1968 to 30 June 1969. United finished in fifth place in the First Division.

== Match results ==
Dundee United played a total of 43 competitive matches during the 1968–69 season.

=== Legend ===
Win
Draw
Loss

All results are written with Dundee United's score first. Own goals in italics

=== First Division ===
Date	Opponent	Venue	Result	Attendance	Scorers
7 September 1968	St Johnstone	A	4–1	4,030	
14 September 1968	Dundee	H	3–1	13,942	
21 September 1968	Aberdeen	A	1–0	12,048	
28 September 1968	Arbroath	H	4–2	6,827	
5 October 1968	Celtic	A	0–2	49,983	
12 October 1968	Kilmarnock	A	0–3	11,847	
19 October 1968	Airdireonians	H	2–1	4,251	
26 October 1968	Hibernian	A	1–1	8,422	
2 November 1968	Clyde	H	1–0	4,905	
9 November 1968	Raith Rovers	A	2–1	4,469	
16 November 1968	Heart of Midlothian	H	4–2	7,914	
23 November 1968	Greenock Morton	H	2–0	6,607	
30 November 1968	St Mirren	A	1–1	8,021	
7 December 1968	Falkirk	H	2–1	5,123	
14 December 1969	Rangers	A	1–2	31,694	
21 December 1969	Partick Thistle	H	2–1	4,832	
28 December 1968	Dunfermline Athletic	A	2–2	5,108	
1 January 1969	St Johnstone	H	4–2	9,976	
2 January 1969	Dundee	A	2–1	19,549	
4 January 1969	Aberdeen	H	1–4	11,221	
11 January 1969	Arbroath	A	1–3	4,637	
18 January 1969	Celtic	H	1–3	19,539	
1 February 1969	Kilmarnock	H	2–2	5,076	
5 March 1969	Raith Rovers	H	3–1	4,647	
8 March 1969	Heart of Midlothian	A	0–1	6,793	
11 March 1969	Clyde	A	2–2	1,064	
15 March 1969	Greenock Morton	A	2–1	9,750	
22 March 1969	St Mirren	H	2–2	5,199	
29 March 1969	Falkirk	A	2–2	2,255	
31 March 1969	Hibernian	H	3–0	5,358	
5 April 1969	Rangers	H	2–1	18,620	
12 April 1969	Partick Thistle	A	0–0	3,382	
19 April 1969	Dunfermline Athletic	H	2–2	8,367	
23 April 1969	Airdrieonians	A	0–1	1,920	

=== Scottish Cup ===
Date	Rd	Opponent	Venue	Result	Attendance	Scorers
25 January 1969	R1	Queen's Park	H	2–1	5,000	K. Cameron, Mitchell
8 February 1969	R2	Ayr United	H	6–2	7,000	K. Cameron (3), Scott (2), Wilson,
1 March 1969	R3	Greenock Morton	H	2–3	9,750	K. Cameron (penalty), Mitchell

=== League Cup ===
Date	Rd	Opponent	Venue	Result	Attendance	Scorers
10 August 1968	G4	Dunfermline Athletic	A	2–3	7,477	Gillespie, K. Cameron
14 August 1968	G4	Clyde	H	2–3	5,239	
17 August 1968	G4	Aberdeen	A	1–4	14,919	Mitchell
24 August 1968	G4	Dunfermline Athletic	H	2–1	6,381	K. Cameron, Wood
28 August 1968	G4	Clyde	A	4–0	3,183	Mitchell (2), Hogg, K. Cameron
31 August 1968	G4	Aberdeen	H	1–0	11,313	J. Smith

== See also ==
- 1968–69 in Scottish football
