= List of Aberdeen F.C. managers =

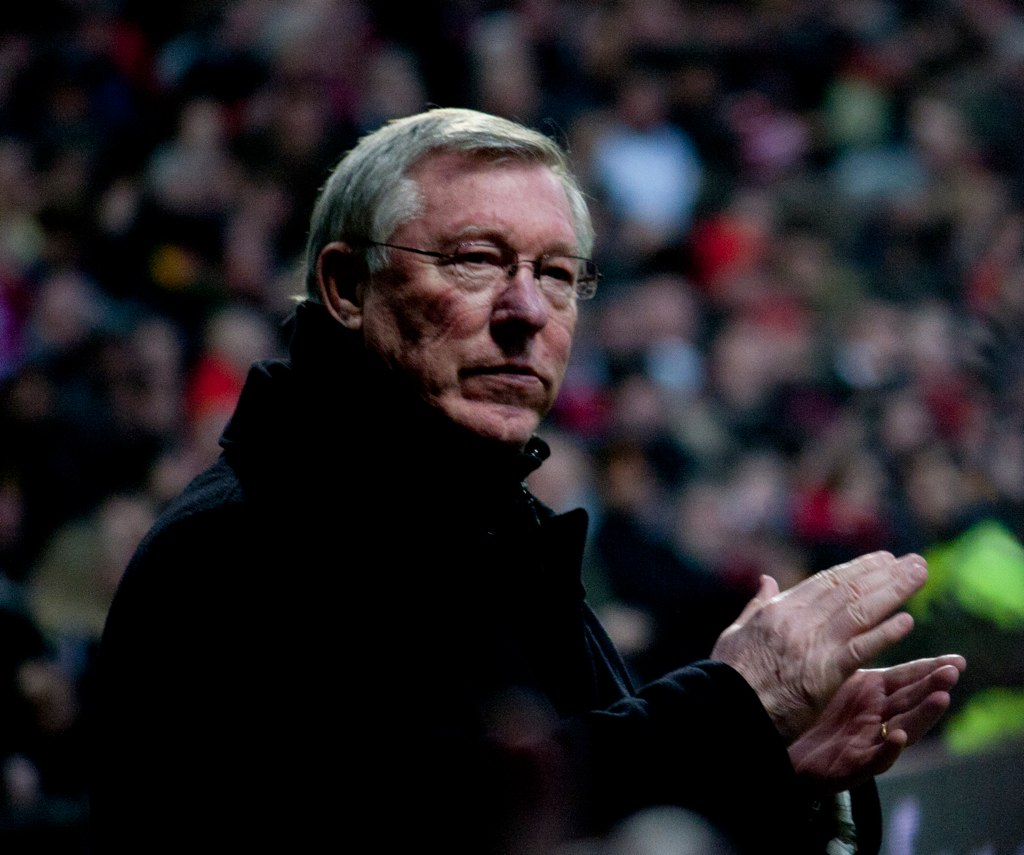
Alex Ferguson, the most successful manager in the history of Aberdeen F.C.

The following is a list of Aberdeen F.C. managers since the club's foundation in 1903. As of February 2024, Aberdeen has had 26 full-time managers, including joint managers.

The most successful Aberdeen manager is Sir Alex Ferguson, who won three Scottish Premier Division titles, four Scottish Cup trophies, one Scottish League Cup, one European Cup Winners' Cup and one UEFA Super Cup in an eight-year spell at the club.

== Statistics ==
Only competitive league & cup matches are counted. As of 4 January 2026.

*	Caretaker manager

#	From	To	Name	P	W	D	L	F	A	Win %	Source
1	1903	1924	(Scotland) Jimmy Philip	644	221	172	251	817	883	34%	
2	1924	1937	(Scotland) Paddy Travers	474	214	106	154	916	732	45%	
3	1937	1955	(Scotland) Dave Halliday	371	165	71	135	731	602	44%	
4	1955	1959	(Scotland) Davie Shaw	148	66	20	62	316	280	45%	
5	1959	1965	(Scotland) Tommy Pearson	180	67	42	71	328	341	37%	
6	1965	1971	(Scotland) Eddie Turnbull	214	100	42	72	386	278	47%	
7	1971	1975	(Scotland) Jimmy Bonthrone	143	67	46	30	264	143	47%	
	1975	1975	(Scotland) George Murray	4	2	0	2	5	6	50%	
8	1975	1977	(Scotland) Ally MacLeod	61	24	19	18	89	72	39%	
9	1977	1978	(Scotland) Billy McNeill	36	22	9	5	68	29	61%	
10	July 1, 1978	November 7, 1986	(Scotland) Alex Ferguson	288	167	71	50	564	229	58%	
	1986	1986	(Scotland) Alex Ferguson (Scotland) Archie Knox	15	7	5	3	25	14	47%	
	1986	1986	(Scotland) Archie Knox	1	0	1	0	0	0	0%	
11	November 5, 1986	May 16, 1988	(Scotland) Ian Porterfield	72	35	27	10	94	40	49%	
12	July 31, 1988	September 20, 1991	(Scotland) Alex Smith (Scotland) Jocky Scott	117	63	35	19	181	89	54%	
13	September 20, 1991	February 10, 1992	(Scotland) Alex Smith	23	7	7	9	34	31	30%	
14	February, 1992	February 7, 1995	(Scotland) Willie Miller	124	53	45	26	182	111	43%	
15	February 7, 1995	November 11, 1997	(Scotland) Roy Aitken	99	35	27	37	125	139	35%	
	November 11, 1997	November 21, 1997	(England) Keith Burkinshaw	2	0	2	0	2	2	0%	
16	November 21, 1997	December 8, 1998	(Scotland) Alex Miller	38	10	11	17	39	52	26%	
	January 1, 1999	May 24, 1999	(Scotland) Paul Hegarty	19	7	2	10	28	43	37%	
17	July 1, 1999	November 29, 2002	(Denmark) Ebbe Skovdahl	130	40	31	59	157	214	31%	
	December 5, 2002	December 11, 2002	(Scotland) Gardner Speirs	1	0	1	0	1	1	0%	
18	December 11, 2002	May 24, 2004	(Scotland) Steve Paterson	57	18	11	28	62	86	32%	
19	June 1, 2004	May 24, 2009	(Scotland) Jimmy Calderwood	190	79	49	62	236	214	42%	
20	July 1, 2009	December 1, 2010	(Scotland) Mark McGhee	53	13	12	28	51	83	24%	
	December 1, 2010	December 10, 2010	(Scotland) Neil Cooper (Scotland) Neil Simpson	1	0	0	1	0	5	0%	
21	December 10, 2010	April 6, 2013	(Scotland) Craig Brown	93	27	29	37	98	107	29%	
22	April 6, 2013	March 8, 2021	(Scotland) Derek McInnes	295	157	60	78	434	303	53%	
	March 8, 2021	March 23, 2021	(Scotland) Paul Sheerin	2	1	0	1	1	1	50%	
23	March 23, 2021	February 13, 2022	(Scotland) Stephen Glass	29	9	6	14	33	39	31%	
	February 13, 2022	February 19, 2022	(Scotland) Barry Robson	1	0	1	0	1	1	0%	
24	February 19, 2022	January 22, 2023	(Republic of Ireland) Jim Goodwin	35	11	7	17	45	56	31%	
25	January 29, 2023	January 31, 2024	(Scotland) Barry Robson	36	15	7	14	45	50	42%	
	January 31, 2024	February 5, 2024	(Scotland) Peter Leven	1	0	1	0	0	0	0%	
	February 5, 2024	March 9, 2024	(England) Neil Warnock	8	2	2	4	12	14	25%	
	March 10, 2024	May 31, 2024	(Scotland) Peter Leven	11	6	3	2	0	0	54%	
26	June 17, 2024	January 4, 2026	(Sweden) Jimmy Thelin	80	33	16	31	109	115	41%	
