= Sandy White =

Sandy White may refer to:

- Sandy White (footballer), Scottish footballer
- Sandy White (programmer), British computer game programmer
