= Duncan McLeod =

Duncan McLeod may refer to:

- Duncan Lloyd McLeod (1874–1935), politician in Manitoba, Canada
- Duncan Stuart McLeod (1854–1933), politician in Manitoba, Canada

== See also ==
- Duncan MacLeod, a fictional character from the Highlander multiverse
- Duncan MacLeod (footballer) (born 1949), Scottish footballer
