= Duncan MacLeod (footballer) =

Scottish footballer

Personal information
- Date of birth: 23 May 1949 (age 77)
- Place of birth: Tobermory, Scotland
- Position: Midfielder

Senior career*
Years	Team	Apps	(Gls)
1968–1971	Southampton	0	(0)
1971–1973	Dundee	0	(0)
1973–1975	Dundee United	25	(3)
1975–1976	St Johnstone	2	(0)
1976–1981	Brechin City	124	(3)
- * Club domestic league appearances and goals

Duncan MacLeod (born 23 May 1949) is a Scottish footballer who played as a midfielder. His clubs included Southampton, Dundee, Dundee United, St Johnstone and Brechin City.

== Playing career ==
MacLeod was born in Tobermory on the Isle of Mull. He began his career with English club Southampton in 1968, where he played in the reserve team. Returning to Scotland, he signed for Dundee in 1971. His only first team appearance for the club came in a Texaco Cup tie against Norwich City.

Released by Dundee after eighteen months, MacLeod joined Dundee United in April 1973. He made his debut in a Scottish League Cup match against East Fife on 11 August 1973, going on to make 36 appearances over the next two seasons without establishing himself as a regular. His three league goals for the club all came in the same match, against Morton on the final day of the 1973–74 season.

In June 1975, MacLeod was transferred to St Johnstone as part-exchange in United's purchase of Henry Hall. He then joined Brechin City in 1976, where he made 124 league appearances before retiring in 1981.
