= 1967–68 Dundee United F.C. season =

Dundee United
1967–68 season
- Chairman: J. Johnston-Grant
- Manager: Jerry Kerr
- Stadium: Tannadice Park
- Scottish First Division: 11th W10 D11 L13 F53 A72 P31
- Scottish Cup: 2nd Round
- League Cup: Group stage

The 1967–68 season was the 59th year of football played by Dundee United, and covers the period from 1 July 1967 to 30 June 1968. United finished in eleventh place in the First Division.

== Match results ==
Dundee United played a total of 42 competitive matches during the 1967–68 season.

=== Legend ===
Win
Draw
Loss

All results are written with Dundee United's score first. Own goals in italics

=== First division ===
Date	Opponent	Venue	Result	Attendance	Scorers
9 September 1967	St Johnstone	H	2–2	5,941	
16 September 1967	Dundee	A	2–2	13,186	
23 September 1967	Hibernian	H	2–2	7,716	
30 September 1967	Airdireonians	A	4–2	2,095	
7 October 1967	Greenock Morton	H	0–2	6,244	
14 October 1967	Aberdeen	A	0–6	8,940	
21 October 1967	Partick Thistle	H	2–2	3,854	
28 October 1967	Falkirk	A	2–1	3,697	
4 November 1967	Motherwell	H	1–1	3,972	
11 November 1967	Heart of Midlothian	A	0–1	7,478	
18 November 1967	Raith Rovers	A	4–2	3,996	
25 November 1967	Kilmarnock	H	3–2	5,144	
2 December 1967	Celtic	A	1–1	33,506	
16 December 1967	Clyde	A	0–5	2,145	
23 December 1967	Dunfermline Athletic	A	2–2	3,731	
30 December 1967	Stirling Albion	H	9–0	4,319	
2 January 1968	Dundee	H	0–0	14,014	
6 January 1968	Hibernian	A	0–3	9,285	
20 January 1968	Greenock Morton	A	2–5	4,692	
3 February 1968	Aberdeen	H	2–3	5,469	
10 February 1968	Partick Thistle	A	0–1	4,527	
2 March 1968	Motherwell	A	3–1	2,501	
6 March 1968	Falkirk	H	3–2	4,000	
16 March 1968	Raith Rovers	H	3–3	4,155	
20 March 1968	Heart of Midlothian	H	2–1	3,801	
25 March 1968	Airdrieonians	H	1–0	2,054	
30 March 1968	Celtic	H	0–5	11,315	
2 April 1968	Rangers	H	0–0	16,338	
6 April 1968	Rangers	A	1–4	31,299	
13 April 1968	Clyde	H	2–1	3,927	
17 April 1968	Kilmarnock	A	0–4	3,020	
20 April 1968	Dunfermline Athletic	H	1–4	4,288	
24 April 1968	St Johnstone	A	1–2	2,776	
27 April 1968	Stirling Albion	A	2–2	943	

=== Scottish Cup ===
Date	Rd	Opponent	Venue	Result	Attendance	Scorers
27 January 1968	R1	St Mirren	H	3–1	9,000	
17 February 1968	R2	Heart of Midlothian	H	5–6	9,021	

=== League Cup ===
Date	Rd	Opponent	Venue	Result	Attendance	Scorers
12 August 1967	G4	Celtic	A	0–1	51,101	
16 August 1967	G4	Aberdeen	H	5–0	11,865	
19 August 1967	G4	Rangers	A	0–1	51,133	
26 August 1967	G4	Celtic	H	0–1	25,697	
30 August 1967	G4	Aberdeen	A	2–2	9,108	
2 September 1967	G4	Rangers	H	0–3	14,121	

== See also ==
- 1967–68 in Scottish football
