= John Flanagan (Scottish footballer) =

Scottish footballer

Personal information
- Date of birth: 26 April 1942
- Place of birth: Glasgow, Scotland
- Date of death: 30 September 2013 (aged 71)
- Position: Forward

Youth career
- Glasgow Perthshire

Senior career*
| Years | Team | Apps | (Gls) |
| 1961–1963 | Albion Rovers | | |
| 1963–1965 | St Johnstone | 39 | (12) |
| 1965–1970 | Partick Thistle | 134 | (34) |
| 1970–1972 | Clyde | 46 | (13) |
- St Roch's
| Total | | 219 | (59) |
- * Club domestic league appearances and goals

John Flanagan (26 April 1942 – 30 September 2013) was a Scottish footballer who played as a forward.

Flanagan played for Albion Rovers, St Johnstone, Partick Thistle and Clyde.
