= John Muir (footballer, born 1947) =

Scottish footballer (1947–2018)

Personal information
- Full name: John Muir
- Date of birth: 1947
- Place of birth: Scotland
- Date of death: February 2018 (aged 70)
- Place of death: England
- Position: Striker

Senior career*
Years	Team	Apps	(Gls)
1967–1969	Alloa Athletic	57	(28)
1969–1976	St Johnstone	134	(37)
1976–1980	Alloa Athletic	74	(20)
Total		265	(85)
- * Club domestic league appearances and goals

John Muir (1947 – February 2018) was a Scottish footballer who played for St Johnstone and Alloa Athletic.

Willie Ormond brought Muir to Muirton Park in 1969 having been impressed by his goalscoring exploits at Alloa Athletic. He made his debut on 2 December 1969 against Kilmarnock and scored his first goal against Hearts on 29 August 1970.

A series of injuries meant that it was not until the 1972-73 season that the Saints fans saw his real abilities and he was the club's top scorer in each of the next two seasons. He made his final appearance for the club against Aberdeen on 21 April 1976 and was freed at the end of the 1975-76 season after relegation from the Scottish Premier Division.

Muir died in February 2018, aged 70.
