= Per Bartram =

Danish footballer (1944–2025)

Personal information
- Full name: Andreas Per Bartram
- Date of birth: 8 January 1944
- Place of birth: Odense, Denmark
- Date of death: 12 May 2025 (aged 81)
- Position: Forward

Senior career*
Years	Team	Apps	(Gls)
1963–1966	Odense BK	67	(50)
1966–1969	Morton	36	(20)
1969–1970	Crystal Palace	10	(2)
1970–1971	Morton	15	(6)
1971–1977	Odense BK	152	(74)
1977–?	Bonnyrigg Rose	?	(?)

International career
1975	Denmark	1	(0)
- * Club domestic league appearances and goals

Andreas Per Bartram (8 January 1944 – 12 May 2025) was a Danish footballer, who played as a forward. He made 61 appearances in the Scottish League and Football League for Morton and Crystal Palace, scoring 28 goals. He also played for Danish club Odense BK and for the Denmark national team.

== Club career ==
Bartram was born on 8 January 1944. He began his playing career in 1963, at Odense BK, then playing in the Danish 2nd Division. The club were promoted in 1966, but Bartram moved on to Morton where he made 36 appearances over the next two years scoring 20 goals. In August 1969, he signed for Crystal Palace then newly promoted to the top flight for the first time, and made 10 League appearances (two goals) between then and December 1970, when he returned to Morton. In the remainder of that season, he made 15 appearances, scoring six times before moving back to Odense BK in 1971. He remained at Odense until 1977, winning the Danish League Championship that year. Odense were also runners-up in the 1974 Danish Cup and Bartram was named "Man of the Match". At the close of his career in Denmark, he returned to Scotland to play for Bonnyrigg Rose Athletic.

== International career ==
Bartram made one appearance for the Denmark national team in 1975.

== Death ==
Bartram died on 12 May 2025, at the age of 81.
