= John Markie =

Scottish footballer (1944–2026)

Personal information
- Full name: John Markie
- Date of birth: 16 December 1944
- Place of birth: Bo'ness, Scotland
- Date of death: 27 February 2026 (aged 81)
- Position: Central defender

Senior career*
Years	Team	Apps	(Gls)
1963–1964	Newcastle United	2	(0)
1964–1976	Falkirk	347	(13)
1976–1977	Clyde	22	(0)
1977–1978	Stenhousemuir	12	(1)
Total		383	(14)
- * Club domestic league appearances and goals

John Markie (16 December 1944 – 27 February 2026) was a Scottish footballer, who played as a central defender.

Markie played for Newcastle United, Falkirk, Clyde and Stenhousemuir.

Markie died on 27 February 2026, at the age of 81.
