= Willie Ormond =

Scottish footballer and manager (1927–1984)

Willie Ormond OBE
Personal information
- Full name: William Esplin Ormond
- Date of birth: 23 February 1927
- Place of birth: Falkirk, Scotland
- Date of death: 4 May 1984 (aged 57)
- Place of death: Musselburgh, Scotland
- Height: 5 ft 8 in (1.73 m)
- Position: Outside left

Senior career*
Years	Team	Apps	(Gls)
1946	Stenhousemuir	9	(0)
1946–1961	Hibernian	335	(147)
1961–1962	Falkirk	27	(4)
Total		371	(151)

International career
1947–1958	Scottish League XI	10	(3)
1952	Scotland B	1	(0)
1954–1959	Scotland	6	(2)
1959	SFL trial v SFA	1	(0)

Managerial career
- 1967–1973: St Johnstone
- 1973–1977: Scotland
- 1977–1980: Heart of Midlothian
- 1980: Hibernian
- * Club domestic league appearances and goals

William Esplin Ormond OBE (23 February 1927 – 4 May 1984) was a Scottish football player and manager. As a player, Ormond was well known as one of Hibernian's Famous Five forward line, winning three league championships in the late 1940s and early 1950s. After a successful spell managing St Johnstone he led Scotland to the 1974 World Cup finals. Scotland were unbeaten at that World Cup, but were eliminated on goal difference.

Ormond was appointed an Officer of the Order of the British Empire (OBE) in the 1975 New Year Honours.

== Playing career ==
=== Club ===
Born in Falkirk, Ormond began his career nearby at Stenhousemuir. He then signed for Hibernian in November 1946. An outside-left, he played for Hibs over a fifteen-year period. He was one of the "Famous Five" forward line, one of the strongest front fives ever in Scottish football. The other forwards were Bobby Johnstone, Lawrie Reilly, Gordon Smith and Eddie Turnbull, who each scored over 100 goals for the club. Ormond scored a total of 187 goals in 503 appearances in all games for Hibs and won the Scottish League Championship three times. He was the last member of the Famous Five to leave Hibs, signing for hometown Falkirk in 1961.

=== Scotland ===
Ormond won six Scotland full international caps and played in Scotland's ill-fated venture to the 1954 FIFA World Cup finals. Ormond also represented the Scottish League XI 10 times.

== Managerial career ==
After he retired from playing, Ormond became assistant trainer at Falkirk.

=== St Johnstone ===
In 1967, he was appointed as manager of St Johnstone. He led the club to the 1969 Scottish League Cup Final (October) and third in the 1970–71 Scottish Football League campaign behind Celtic and Aberdeen. This league finish meant that St Johnstone qualified for European competition for the first time. Ormond is still remembered as one of the club's most revered figures and his contribution to the club was later recognised by the club naming the South Stand at McDiarmid Park in his honour.

One of the reasons Ormond's time at St Johnstone is remembered by Jim Pearson as, ‘Same as usual boys, attack them’ The abilities of players such as John Connolly, Henry Hall, Kenny Aird and Jim Pearson enhanced the attacking style of play.

Although greatly disappointed at Ormond leaving in 1972, St Johnstone were proud that he had become manager of Scotland.

=== Scotland national team ===
The Scottish Football Association replaced Tommy Docherty with Ormond in 1973 after Docherty left to join Manchester United. Ormond guided Scotland to the 1974 World Cup Finals in West Germany. Scotland beat Zaire and drew with Brazil and Yugoslavia to return home as the only unbeaten team in the tournament. They were eliminated after the group stage first round, but this remains the best-ever performance by a Scotland team in a World Cup.

UEFA Euro 1976 qualifying was unsuccessful in large part due to losing 2–1 at home to Spain in the campaign opener. On 5 February 1975 he sent Paul Wilson on as a 75th-minute substitute in the return game in Valencia (a 1–1 draw); this was the only appearance by a non-white footballer in the Scotland national team in the 20th century.

Ormond resigned as Scotland manager in May 1977.

As Scotland manager, Ormond was also responsible for the Scottish League XI. He also managed a Glasgow Select against a Football League XI to mark the Silver Jubilee of Elizabeth II.

=== Heart of Midlothian ===
In May 1977 Ormond was appointed as manager of Heart of Midlothian – the arch rivals of his old team, Hibs. Ormond was dismissed in 1980.

=== Hibernian ===
Ormond returned to Hibernian as assistant to his old Famous Five colleague Eddie Turnbull. When Turnbull resigned, Ormond took over as manager but he was forced to retire soon afterwards due to health issues.

== Personal life ==
His brother Gibby also played league football, for Airdrie, Dundee United, Cowdenbeath and Alloa. Gibby also represented the Scottish League. Another brother, Bert Ormond, emigrated and represented New Zealand at international level in 1962.

== Career statistics ==
=== International ===
Appearances and goals by national team and year
National team	Year	Apps	Goals
Scotland	1954	5	2
Scotland	1959	1	0
Total		6	2

Scores and results list Scotland's goal tally first, score column indicates score after each Ormond goal.

List of international goals scored by Willie Ormond
No.	Date	Venue	Opponent	Score	Result	Competition	Ref.
1	3 April 1954	Hampden Park, Glasgow, Scotland	England	2–4	2–4	1953–54 British Home Championship	
2	25 May 1954	Olympic Stadium, Helsinki, Finland	Finland	1–0	2–1	Friendly match	

=== Managerial record ===
As of 28 March 2015

Team	Nat	From	To	Record				
Team	Nat	From	To	G	W	D	L	Win %
Scotland	(Scotland)	1973	1977	38	18	8	12	47.37
