= Billy Steele =

Scottish footballer

Personal information
- Full name: William Steele
- Date of birth: 19 May 1956 (age 70)
- Place of birth: Dunfermline, Scotland
- Position: Striker

Youth career
- Oakley Star

Senior career*
Years	Team	Apps	(Gls)
1971–1975	Rangers	0	(0)
1975–1977	Dundee United	10	(0)
1977–1978	Dumbarton	20	(2)
1978–1982	Cowdenbeath	172	(70)
1982–1984	Arbroath	66	(21)
- * Club domestic league appearances and goals

William Steele (born 19 May 1956 in Dunfermline) is a Scottish former footballer who played as a striker.

== Career ==
Steele began his career in the early 1970s as a youngster with Rangers, although he failed to make a first-team appearance. In 1975, Steele moved to Dundee United, making ten league appearances over a year and a half in the newly formed Premier Division. After refusing to move to Dundee, as was required by then-manager Jim McLean, Steele dropped down a division to join Dumbarton. Playing in twice as many matches for the Sons, Steele moved on again at the end of the season, dropping down to the Second Division with Cowdenbeath. Steele spent five years back in his native Fife before a final two-year playing spell with Arbroath.

After leaving football, Steele moved into the bookmaker business, working in Edinburgh before opening BS Bookmakers in Inverkeithing.
