= Don McVicar =

Scottish footballer

Personal information
- Full name: Donald Frederick McVicar
- Date of birth: 6 November 1962
- Place of birth: Perth, Scotland
- Date of death: 31 January 2006 (aged 43)
- Place of death: Dundee, Scotland
- Position: Left back

Senior career*
Years	Team	Apps	(Gls)
1981–1985	St Johnstone	88	(1)
1985–1986	Tranmere Rovers	7	(0)
1985–1987	Montrose	18	(0)
1986–1992	St Johnstone	151	(10)
1991–1993	Partick Thistle	48	(0)
1993–1994	Airdrieonians	21	(0)
1993–1995	Ayr United	15	(0)
1994–1996	Forfar Athletic	39	(1)
1995–1997	Arbroath	29	(2)
Total		416	(14)
- * Club domestic league appearances and goals

Donald Frederick McVicar (6 November 1962 – 31 January 2006) was a Scottish footballer who played as a left back.

== Career ==
McVicar spent most of his career at St Johnstone and made a total of 263 appearances, scoring 12 goals in two spells with the club. A winner of the First Division championship with Saints in 1982–83, he had an even happier second spell at Perth. He played an integral role under Alex Totten to help the club gain promotion from the Second Division in 1987–88 and then captained the team to the First Division title again in 1989–90.

McVicar also played for Tranmere Rovers, Montrose, Partick Thistle, Airdrieonians, Ayr United, Forfar Athletic, Arbroath and Elgin City.

== Death ==
McVicar died on 31 January 2006, aged 43, after suffering from motor neuron disease for four years. Geoff Brown, then St Johnstone chairman, said: "It is sad news to hear, obviously for his family and all Perth supporters.Don was highly thought of by fans because of his strong left-foot and the fact he tackled extremely hard. He was a supporters' type of player."
