= Jim Burns (footballer) =

Scottish footballer (1943–2025)

Personal information
- Date of birth: 10 August 1943
- Place of birth: Stirling, Scotland
- Date of death: 11 May 2025 (aged 81)
- Position: Defender

Senior career*
Years	Team	Apps	(Gls)
1962–1967	Cowdenbeath	170	(24)
1967–1976	Clyde	270	(19)
1976–1980	Stirling Albion	66	(0)
Total		506	(43)
- * Club domestic league appearances and goals

James Burns (10 August 1943 – 11 May 2025) was a Scottish footballer.

Burns, a defender, began his career with Cowdenbeath. He made over 200 appearances for them before joining Clyde in 1967. Burns spent nine years with the Glasgow club, and made over 300 appearances, including 179 consecutive appearances between 1968 and 1972, making him one of the club's finest servants. Burns left Clyde in 1976 to join Stirling Albion. He retired in 1980, and became a coach at Stirling.

Burns died on 11 May 2025, at the age of 81.
