= Alan Devlin (footballer) =

Scottish footballer

Personal information
- Full name: Alan Thomas Devlin
- Date of birth: 10 October 1953 (age 73)
- Place of birth: Edinburgh, Scotland
- Position: Forward

Youth career
- Tynecastle Boys Club

Senior career*
Years	Team	Apps	(Gls)
1969–1972	Dundee United	8	(3)
1973–1974	Exeter City	1	(0)
- Broxburn Athletic
Total		9	(3)
- * Club domestic league appearances and goals

Alan Thomas Devlin (born 10 October 1953) is a Scottish former footballer who played as a forward for Dundee United, Exeter City and Broxburn Athletic.

== Early life ==
Devlin was born in Edinburgh on 10 October 1953. He played youth football for Tynecastle Boys Club.

== Career ==
Devlin initially joined Dundee United as a schoolboy signing. He turned professional in October 1969 and became a regular in the reserve team, going on to make over fifty appearances at that level. He made his first team debut as a substitute against Morton on 9 January 1971, scoring a goal in United's 3–2 defeat. He made his first starting appearance the following week, but was unable to establish himself as a first team regular, going on to score four goals in a total of twelve appearances. He accepted the offer of a free transfer in September 1972.

Devlin signed for Exeter City in November 1973, making one Football League appearance for the club. He later played junior football in Scotland for Broxburn Athletic.
