= Willie Coburn =

Scottish footballer

Personal information
- Date of birth: 13 April 1941
- Date of death: 5 December 2015 (aged 74)
- Position: Full-back

Youth career
- –1962: Crieff Earngrove

Senior career*
| Years | Team | Apps | (Gls) |
| 1962–1972 | St Johnstone | 238 | (12) |
| 1972–1973 | Forfar Athletic | 32 | (1) |
| 1973–1974 | Cowdenbeath | 11 | (0) |
| Total | | 281 | (13) |
- * Club domestic league appearances and goals

Willie Simpson Coburn (13 April 1941 – 5 December 2015) was a Scottish footballer who played as a full-back. He spent much of his career with St Johnstone and also played for Forfar Athletic and Cowdenbeath.

Coburn joined St Johnstone from Crieff Earngrove juniors in 1962 and went on to make 238 appearances for the Perth club before leaving in 1972 for Forfar Athletic. He made 32 appearances and scored once in a season at Forfar. He made 11 appearances at Cowdenbeath in the 1973–74 season. Coburn was one of five players to be voted into St Johnstone's inaugural Hall of Fame in 2013.

Coburn died on 5 December 2015 at the age of 74.
