= Alex Rennie =

Scottish footballer and manager

Personal information
- Full name: Alexander Duncan Rennie
- Date of birth: 27 September 1948
- Place of birth: Falkirk, Scotland
- Date of death: 4 March 2018 (aged 69)
- Position: Defender

Youth career
- Gairdoch United

Senior career*
Years	Team	Apps	(Gls)
1964–1967	Rangers	0	(0)
1967–1968	Stirling Albion	3	(0)
1968–1975	St Johnstone	197	(7)
1975–1978	Dundee United	63	(0)

Managerial career
- 1980: Heart of Midlothian (caretaker)
- 1980–1985: St Johnstone
- 1987–1989: Stenhousemuir
- * Club domestic league appearances and goals

Alexander Duncan Rennie (27 September 1948 – 4 March 2018) was a Scottish football player and manager who played as a defender. He played for St Johnstone between 1968 and 1975, making almost 200 league appearances, and later managed the club from 1980 until 1985, winning the Scottish First Division title in 1983. He also played for Rangers, Stirling Albion and Dundee United and managed Stenhousemuir.

== Playing career ==
Alex Rennie was born in Falkirk on 27 September 1948. He played for local youth team Gairdoch United during the 1962–63 season. He joined Rangers, where he played in the reserve team. After a brief spell with Stirling Albion, making three league appearances, he joined St Johnstone in 1968, going on to make 197 league appearances, scoring 7 goals. He was part of the St Johnstone team managed by Willie Ormond that finished third in the Scottish Football League in the 1970-71 season and also played in their subsequent UEFA Cup campaign.

Rennie was released by St Johnstone in April 1975. He was offered a contract by Hong Kong Rangers, but ultimately decided to remain in Scotland, signing for Dundee United in June 1975. After making 63 league appearances over the next three seasons, an eye injury forced him to retire from playing.

== Management career ==
Rennie was a member of Ormond's coaching staff at Heart of Midlothian in the late 1970s. He took over as caretaker manager in January 1980 after Ormond was sacked despite Hearts being top of the First Division. The team remained unbeaten in six matches under Rennie before Bobby Moncur took over and steered them to the league title.

After leaving Hearts, Rennie returned to St Johnstone as manager in April 1980. He was instrumental in converting the young Ally McCoist from a midfielder to a forward before selling the player to Sunderland for a club record fee. Rennie remained at the club until 1985, winning the First Division title in the 1982-83 season. He left the club in 1985 after two successive relegations, and later managed Stenhousemuir from 1987 to 1989.

== After football ==
Rennie ran a pub in Falkirk with his wife, the Blackmill Inn, and also worked as a driving instructor. Having previously recovered from throat cancer, he died on 4 March 2018 from the effects of oesophageal cancer, aged 69.

== Honours ==
=== Manager ===
St Johnstone

- Scottish First Division: 1982-83
