= Alex Gordon (footballer) =

Scottish footballer

Alex Gordon (25 July 1940 – 18 February 1996) was a Scottish footballer who played for Dundee United, Bradford Park Avenue and St Johnstone.
