= Walter Smith =

Scottish football player and manager (1948–2021)

Walter Smith OBE
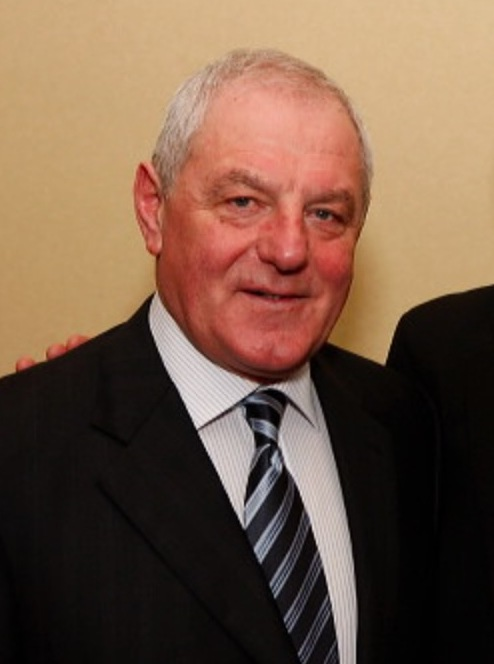
- Smith in 2010

Personal information
- Full name: Walter Ferguson Smith
- Date of birth: 24 February 1948
- Place of birth: Lanark, Scotland
- Date of death: 26 October 2021 (aged 73)
- Position: Defender

Youth career
- Drumchapel Amateurs
- Ashfield

Senior career*
Years	Team	Apps	(Gls)
1966–1975	Dundee United	108	(2)
1967	→ Dallas Tornado (loan)	3	(0)
1975–1977	Dumbarton	44	(0)
1977–1980	Dundee United	26	(0)
Total		181	(2)

Managerial career
- 1978–1982: Scotland U18
- 1982–1986: Scotland U21
- 1991–1998: Rangers
- 1998–2002: Everton
- 2004–2007: Scotland
- 2007–2011: Rangers
- * Club domestic league appearances and goals

Walter Ferguson Smith (24 February 1948 – 26 October 2021) was a Scottish football player, manager and director, primarily associated with his two spells as manager of Glasgow club Rangers.

A defender, Smith's playing career consisted of two spells with Dundee United, split by a short time at Dumbarton. A pelvic injury caused his retirement from playing and Smith moved into coaching at Dundee United, working for manager Jim McLean. Smith also took charge of the Scotland under-18 and under-21 teams, and assisted Scotland manager Alex Ferguson at the 1986 FIFA World Cup in Mexico, after it had been announced that he would be moving to Rangers as assistant to Graeme Souness.

Smith became the manager of Rangers in 1991, succeeding Souness. He won thirteen major trophies in seven years, including seven league titles in succession. After leaving Rangers at the end of the 1997–98 season, he was appointed manager of English Premier League club Everton. He was in charge at Goodison Park for four seasons before he was sacked in 2002.

After a brief stint as assistant manager to Alex Ferguson at Manchester United, Smith was appointed Scotland manager in December 2004. He presided over a revival in their fortunes, taking the national team seventy places up the FIFA World Rankings. After a UEFA Euro 2008 qualifying, he resigned as Scotland manager in January 2007 to return to Rangers. He won eight trophies during his second spell as Rangers manager and guided the team to the 2008 UEFA Cup final, before retiring from management in 2011. Smith is the second-most-successful manager in the history of Rangers, behind Bill Struth.

== Early life ==
Smith was born in Lanark, but grew up in the Carmyle district in the East End of Glasgow, and was a boyhood fan of Rangers. He was employed by the South of Scotland Electricity Board, and played youth football for Drumchapel Amateurs, before launching his football career in the 1960s with Junior League team Ashfield.

== Playing career ==
=== Dundee United ===
Smith was one of three Ashfield players signed by Dundee United manager Jerry Kerr in 1966, joining the club in November shortly after teammates Jim Cameron and Gerry Hernon. A versatile player, Smith appeared for the reserve team in a number of positions, initially as a right-half. He made his first team debut in a Scottish Football League match against Kilmarnock on 20 March 1967. He continued to play regularly for the reserves, but made only a handful of first-team appearances for Dundee United over the next four years until establishing himself in the latter part of the 1970–71 season. He also played for the Dallas Tornado in the United Soccer Association in 1967, when their roster was supplemented with Dundee United players.

Smith remained a regular first-team player for United until 1974, often in central defence. His future coaching mentor Jim McLean became manager in December 1971, and the following month his future managerial assistant Archie Knox became a teammate. In September 1973, Smith scored the only goal of the game as United defeated Dundee in the Dundee derby; he celebrated by kissing his boot, a gesture which he was later embarrassed by. He played in the 1974 Scottish Cup Final against Celtic, Dundee United's first appearance in a major final, but finished with a runners-up medal following a 3–0 defeat.

Smith played less regularly the following season, and in September 1975 was sold to Dumbarton. He had played in 108 league games, scoring two goals, between 1966 and 1975.

=== Dumbarton and return to Dundee United ===
Smith was brought to Dumbarton for a fee of £8,000 by the management team of Alex Wright and former Rangers player Davie Wilson, who was one of Smith's heroes as a teenage supporter. Wilson worked alongside Smith's father at a local steelworks in the village of Westburn, Cambuslang, and was a senior teammate at Dundee United. During his spell with Dumbarton, the club made a rare appearance at the semi-final stage of the Scottish Cup in 1976, losing to Hearts after a replay, with Smith scoring an early own goal.

He played in 44 league games for Dumbarton before McLean paid a fee of £4,000 to bring him back to Dundee United in February 1977. Shortly afterwards, however, a serious pelvic injury effectively curtailed Smith's playing career at the age of 29.

Thereafter, he played mainly in the reserve team, helping to develop younger players. His final first-team appearance was in September 1980, by which time he was embarking on a coaching career. He appeared in 26 league matches during his second spell and, in total, made 183 senior appearances for Dundee United, scoring three goals. Additionally, he set a club record by making approximately 360 reserve-team appearances.

== Managerial career ==
=== Coaching Dundee United and Scotland ===
He developed his coaching skills as assistant manager to Jim McLean, at a time when Dundee United were Scottish champions and European Cup semi-finalists. While working with McLean, a notoriously hard-bitten manager, Smith developed a reputation for being a strict disciplinarian. According to Kevin Gallacher, who was an apprentice of the club at the time in the early 1980s, Smith could become ferociously angry and was known to deal out punches to enforce discipline. He joined Dundee United's board of directors in 1986.

In 1978, he was appointed coach of the Scotland Under-18 team, and helped them to win the European Youth Championship in 1982. He became coach of the Under 21 team, and was Alex Ferguson's assistant manager during the 1986 Mexico World Cup. Ferguson commented on Smith by saying: "There are few people in the game with his experience, knowledge and technical ability."

=== Rangers ===
In late February 1986, Smith attended a meeting the Gleneagles Hotel at which he was informed that Graeme Souness was to be appointed player-manager of Rangers, and the latter wanted Smith as his assistant. Smith accepted the offer and within a few weeks Rangers made an official approach to Dundee United, who demanded £50,000 in compensation. The then Rangers chief executive David Holmes duly paid that amount, and Smith was allowed to join Rangers on 16 April. Smith was initially placed in temporary charge of the first team whilst Souness negotiated his own release from his playing contract with Italian side Sampdoria. He took sole charge of two Scottish Premier Division matches, on 19 and 26 April, both away, to St Mirren and Aberdeen respectively.

Smith helped Souness guide Rangers to Premier Division and League Cup glory in 1986–87, another League Cup in 1987–88, the Premier Division and League Cup again in 1988–89, a second successive league title in 1989–90 and another League Cup in 1990–91.

With Souness continuing to play regularly until 1988, Smith was the principal figure in the dugout for many matches. In addition, Smith took sole charge of the team in the 1987 Scottish League Cup Final as Souness was suspended. Souness was subject to an extensive touchline ban from February 1989, although he frequently circumvented this by naming himself as a substitute.

When Souness left for Liverpool in April 1991, Smith was appointed interim manager. This was made permanent in May 1991, after the club clinched its fourth title in five seasons. Six more league titles in succession followed under Smith's tenure, including a domestic treble in 1992–93. He also won the Scottish Cup and the League Cup three times each. Smith took Rangers to the brink of the final of the Champions League in season 1992–93, going ten games without defeat in that campaign and 44 matches unbeaten in all competitions.

This success was achieved at a cost, as Smith spent over £50m on transfer fees in his six years in charge – more than any other club in Great Britain over the same period – although in terms of net spend, particularly due to the sales of Trevor Steven in 1991 for £5.5 million and Duncan Ferguson in 1994 for £4.3 million, it was comparable for much of that time to the type of support offered across the city to Tommy Burns at Celtic.

Rangers equalled Celtic's record of nine successive championships in 1996–97. In an effort to secure a record-breaking tenth success in 1997–98, Rangers spent £13m on eight new players. In European competition, Rangers were beaten 4–1 by IFK Gothenburg in the 1997–98 UEFA Champions League preliminary round and 4–2 by Strasbourg in the first round of the 1997–98 UEFA Cup. There was growing pressure on Smith because of poor European results, and it was announced in October 1997 that he would leave Rangers at the end of the season. Rangers lost the league title to Celtic on the final day and then lost the 1998 Scottish Cup final to Hearts.

=== Everton ===
After success in his native Scotland, Smith's retirement lasted a month as he took the manager's job at Premier League club Everton in June 1998. Initially Smith had been linked with the manager's job at Sheffield Wednesday, but false promises made to him by the Everton chairman of massive transfer funds and unlimited ambition lured Smith to Goodison Park. Smith spent money on players only to discover that it was money the club did not have. When Duncan Ferguson was sold behind Smith's back, he was tempted to quit. The remainder of his time at Everton revolved around selling the club's better players such as John Collins, Olivier Dacourt, Don Hutchison, Marco Materazzi, Nick Barmby, Francis Jeffers and Michael Ball to balance the books.

Under Smith, Everton finished in the bottom half of the table for three consecutive seasons. The Everton board finally ran out of patience with Smith and he was sacked in March 2002 after an "abject" 3–0 FA Cup sixth-round defeat to Middlesbrough, with Everton in some danger of relegation from the Premier League. He was replaced by David Moyes, who managed Everton to a safe finish in fifteenth place.

=== Manchester United ===
In March 2004, Smith returned to football when he had a short spell as assistant manager to Alex Ferguson at Manchester United at the end of the 2003–04 season. During this time Manchester United won the 2004 FA Cup Final, beating Millwall at the Millennium Stadium in Cardiff.

=== Scotland national team ===
Smith was appointed manager of the Scottish national team on 2 December 2004, succeeding Berti Vogts. Despite a revival of fortunes under Smith, including a home draw with Italy and an away win against Norway, hopes of reaching the 2006 World Cup were ended by a 1–0 home defeat against Belarus.

Scotland's world ranking improved by seventy places during his tenure. Scotland recorded a famous victory against World Cup runners-up France in a UEFA Euro 2008 qualification match at Hampden and temporarily led their group by three points. A 2–0 defeat against Ukraine on 11 October 2006 was the first of the campaign.

=== Return to Rangers ===
On 5 January 2007, press outlets reported that Rangers had spoken to Smith with a view to hiring him to manage Rangers again, with Ally McCoist as assistant manager. The Scottish FA initially rebuffed Rangers' approach for Smith, but his return as Rangers manager was announced on 10 January 2007. He succeeded Paul Le Guen, who had left the club by mutual consent after Rangers had been knocked out of the 2006–07 Scottish League Cup by First Division side St Johnstone and fallen 17 points behind Celtic in the 2006–07 Scottish Premier League; caretaker manager Ian Durrant (who had previously played under him) was retained on the coaching staff.

Smith's first match in his second spell at Ibrox was a 5–0 win against Dundee United on 13 January, with two goals from Kris Boyd and one each from Barry Ferguson, Chris Burke and Charlie Adam. Smith's first final since his return was secured with a 2–0 win over Hearts in the 2007–08 Scottish League Cup. Rangers played Dundee United in the 2008 Scottish League Cup Final; the game was drawn 1–1 after normal time, and 2–2 after extra time. The winners were decided by penalty kicks. Rangers won 3–2, with Kris Boyd scoring the winning penalty (as well as the goals for Rangers in normal time and extra time).

In the 2007–08 UEFA Cup, Smith booked Rangers' first European final for 36 years, after an exit in the UEFA Champions League group stage on the final day after good results against VFB Stuttgart, Olympique Lyonnais and FC Barcelona. In the quarter-final, after a 0–0 home draw with Sporting, Rangers went on to win the away leg 2–0. In the semi-final they drew 0–0 in both legs against Fiorentina and after extra time, they won 4–2 on penalties, taking Rangers to the UEFA Cup Final in Manchester, which they lost 0–2 to Zenit St. Petersburg. Rangers also narrowly missed out on the league title, partly attributable to an end-of-season fixture backlog due to their cup runs. They added the 2007–08 Scottish Cup with a win over Queen of the South in what was their 68th match of the campaign; afterwards, Smith revealed that assistant McCoist had been controlling the team in the Scottish Cup run.

In the 2008–09 UEFA Champions League second qualifying round, Rangers drew 0–0 with Lithuanian side FBK Kaunas at Ibrox on 30 July 2008 and lost the return leg 2–1. The loss against Kaunas meant Rangers made an early exit from European competition. Rangers went on to claim the SPL title – the club's 52nd championship – on 24 May 2009. Smith followed this up with the Scottish Cup a week later to end the season with a League and Cup double.

In December 2009, it was revealed that Smith was to continue as Rangers manager without a contract when it expired the following month. In March 2010, he guided Rangers to win the League Cup after they had been reduced to nine men in the final. On 25 April 2010, Rangers clinched their 53rd league title with a 1–0 win away to Hibernian.

On 25 May 2010, Smith signed a new one-year deal to continue as Rangers manager throughout the 2010–11 campaign. He stated that it would be his last as Rangers manager, with McCoist to take control thereafter. In this final season as manager, Smith led Rangers to another domestic double, winning the League Cup and their 54th league championship. The league title was secured on the final day of the season, with a 5–1 win against Kilmarnock at Rugby Park.

== After management ==
Rangers entered administration in February 2012. An attempt to take the club out of administration by means of a creditors voluntary arrangement was rejected by HM Revenue & Customs, the largest creditor, putting the club into liquidation in June 2012. The administrator, Duff & Phelps, sold the assets of Rangers to a consortium led by Charles Green. Smith said that he was leading a consortium offering a deal to buy the assets from Green, but this offer was withdrawn days later. On 11 November 2012, Smith returned to Ibrox taking on a role with the new Rangers company as a non-executive director. Smith was appointed non-executive chairman in May 2013, but he resigned from the board in August.

Smith was linked with a return to management as Scotland manager in February 2018, but he withdrew his name from consideration after discussions with the Scottish FA.

== Personal life ==
Smith was married to Ethel, with whom he had two sons.

Smith was a close friend of former Celtic player and manager Tommy Burns. He was a pallbearer at Burns's funeral in 2008.

Politically, Smith described himself as a socialist and said he was brought up with "socialist principles".

During the 2014 Scottish independence referendum Smith was a supporter of the Better Together campaign against Scottish independence.

He underwent an unspecified medical operation in March 2021 that required him to stay in hospital.

== Death ==
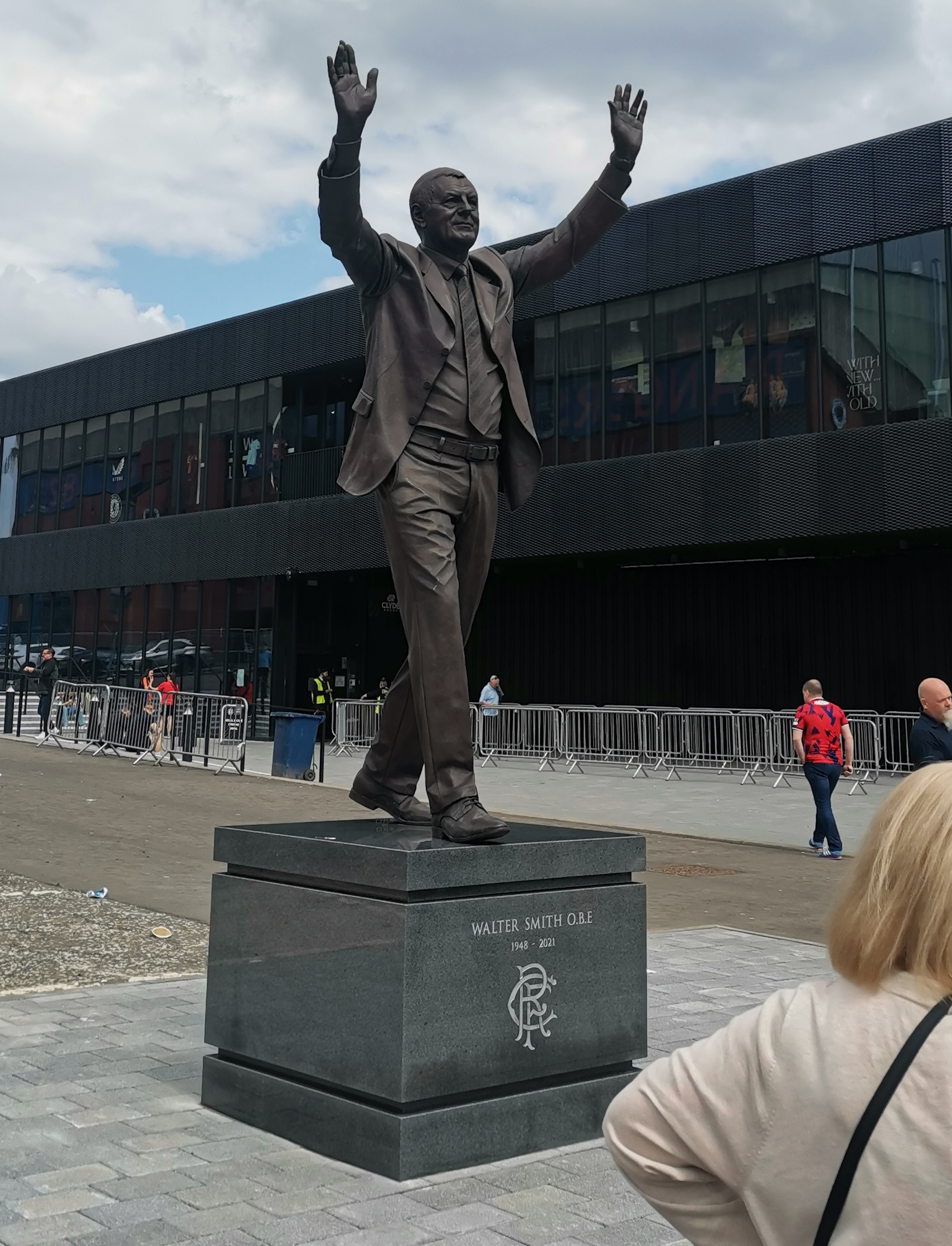
Statue of Smith at Ibrox Stadium

Smith died from cancer on the morning of 26 October 2021, aged 73. A private family funeral was held on 3 November, followed by a public memorial service at Glasgow Cathedral on 19 November.

=== Legacy ===
On 25 May 2024, a statue of Smith was unveiled in front of Ibrox's Copland Road Stand.

== Managerial statistics ==
Team	Nat	From	To	Record				
Team	Nat	From	To	G	W	D	L	Win %
Rangers	(Scotland)	16 April 1991	31 May 1998	380	249	68	63	65.53
Everton	(England)	1 July 1998	13 March 2002	168	53	50	65	31.55
Scotland	(Scotland)	2 December 2004	10 January 2007	16	7	5	4	43.75
Scotland B	(Scotland)	7 December 2004	14 November 2006	5	1	1	3	20.00
Rangers	(Scotland)	10 January 2007	15 May 2011	246	155	53	38	63.01
Total				815	465	177	173	57.06

== Honours ==
=== Player ===
Dundee United

- Scottish Cup runner-up: 1973–74

=== Manager ===
Scotland U18

- UEFA European Under-18 Championship: 1982
- Atlantic Cup: 1979

Rangers

- Scottish Premier Division/Scottish Premier League: 1990–91, 1991–92, 1992–93, 1993–94, 1994–95, 1995–96, 1996–97, 2008–09, 2009–10, 2010–11
- Scottish Cup: 1991–92, 1992–93, 1995–96, 2007–08, 2008–09
- Scottish League Cup: 1992–93, 1993–94, 1996–97, 2007–08, 2009–10, 2010–11
- UEFA Cup runner-up: 2007–08

Scotland

- Kirin Cup: 2006

=== Individual ===
- Scottish Premier League Manager of the Year: 2007–08, 2009–10
- SFWA Manager of the Year: 1991–92, 1992–93, 1993–94, 1995–96, 1996–97, 2007–08, 2009–10
- PFA Scotland Manager of the Year: 2009–10
- Premier League Manager of the Month: September 1999
- Scottish Premier League Manager of the Month: August 2007, January 2008, March 2008, April 2009, December 2009, August 2010

Honorary degree

- Honorary doctorate in recognition of his achievements in Scottish football, Glasgow Caledonian University (2012)

Orders

- Officer of the Order of the British Empire: 1997
