= Kenny Aird =

Scottish footballer (1947–2024)

Personal information
- Date of birth: 13 April 1947
- Place of birth: Glasgow, Scotland
- Date of death: 22 November 2024 (aged 77)
- Height: 5 ft 5 in (1.65 m)
- Position: Winger

Senior career*
Years	Team	Apps	(Gls)
1964–1965	Celtic	0	(0)
1965–1967	St Mirren	36	(3)
1967–1973	St Johnstone	161	(32)
1972–1977	Heart of Midlothian	87	(9)
1977	Toronto Metros	7	(0)
1977–1978	Arbroath	1	(0)
Total		292	(44)
- * Club domestic league appearances and goals

Kenneth Aird (13 April 1947 – 22 November 2024) was a Scottish footballer who played for Celtic, St Mirren, St Johnstone, Hearts, Toronto Metros and Arbroath. Aird died on 22 November 2024, at the age of 77.
