= Pat Gardner (footballer) =

Scottish footballer

Personal information
- Date of birth: 27 November 1943 (age 82)
- Position: Inside forward

Youth career
- Bellshill Athletic

Senior career*
| Years | Team | Apps | (Gls) |
| 1962–1964 | Queen of the South | 20 | (2) |
| 1964 | Airdrieonians | 0 | (0) |
| 1964–1967 | Raith Rovers | 135 | (57) |
| 1967–1971 | Dunfermline Athletic | 141 | (39) |
| 1972–1974 | Dundee United | 72 | (18) |
| 1974–1976 | Motherwell | 34 | (5) |
| 1976–1977 | Arbroath | 37 | (2) |
- * Club domestic league appearances and goals

Pat Gardner (born 27 November 1943) is a Scottish former footballer, who played for Queen of the South, Airdrieonians, Raith Rovers, Dunfermline Athletic, Dundee United, Motherwell and Arbroath.

Gardner began his senior career under player/manager George Farm at Dumfries club, Queen of the South, spending two seasons at the club which were in the Scottish League's top division at the time. He joined Farm again at Raith Rovers then moved to Dunfermline in the summer of 1967 for a "sizeable" fee, following manager George Farm. He helped Dunfermline win the 1967–68 Scottish Cup, scoring two goals in the victory against Heart of Midlothian in the final. The Pars progressed to the semi-finals of the 1968–69 European Cup Winners' Cup, with Gardner scoring the only goal of the quarter-final tie against West Bromwich Albion. He later helped Dundee United reach the 1974 Scottish Cup Final, which they lost 3–0 to Celtic.
