= Alex Reid (footballer, born 1947) =

Scottish footballer

Personal information
- Full name: Dennis Alexander Reid
- Date of birth: 2 March 1947
- Place of birth: Glasgow, Scotland
- Date of death: 1998 (aged 50–51)
- Place of death: Canada
- Position: Midfielder

Senior career*
| Years | Team | Apps | (Gls) |
| 1964–1968 | Rangers | 3 | (2) |
| 1968–1971 | Dundee United | 99 | (11) |
| 1971–1973 | Newcastle United | 23 | (0) |
| 1973 | → Morton (loan) | 7 | (1) |
| 1973–1976 | Morton | 65 | (13) |
| 1976–1977 | Dundee United | 11 | (3) |
| 1977 | Ayr United | 2 | (0) |
| Total | | 210 | (30) |
- * Club domestic league appearances and goals

Dennis Alexander Reid (2 March 1947 – 1998) was a Scottish footballer whose career as a midfielder extended from 1964 (Rangers) to 1977 (Ayr United).

A native of Glasgow, Alex Reid began his professional career with hometown club Rangers, but left after making only three league appearances at senior level. Joining Dundee United in 1968, Reid's performances against Newcastle United in the 1969 Fair Cup won him a somewhat-delayed move to Tyneside in 1971, although he returned to Scotland eighteen months later with Morton. Three seasons later, Reid returned to Dundee United before finishing his career with a couple of appearances for Ayr United.

After retiring in 1977 due to injury, Reid moved to Canada where he died in the year of his 51st birthday.
