= Sandy White (footballer) =

Scottish footballer

Personal information
- Full name: Alexander Smith White
- Date of birth: 3 November 1950 (age 75)
- Place of birth: Ballingry, Scotland
- Position: Left winger

Senior career*
Years	Team	Apps	(Gls)
- Glenrothes
1971–1974	Dundee United	47	(11)
1975–1978	Forfar Athletic	61	(21)
- Glenrothes
Total		108	(32)
- * Club domestic league appearances and goals

Alexander Smith White (born 3 November 1950) is a Scottish former footballer who played as a left winger.

== Career ==
White began his professional career with Dundee United alongside his identical twin brother Joe, with the siblings playing together for the first time on 18 December 1971 in a 3–0 defeat away to Aberdeen (they were the first pair of twins to play for the club).

White spent three years at Tannadice before moving to Forfar Athletic in 1975, where he went on to make over sixty league appearances. In 1978, White left the senior game and returned to Glenrothes, rejoining his brother who had returned to the Fife Junior club four years earlier.
