= Archie Knox =

Scottish footballer (born 1947)

Personal information
- Full name: Archibald Gall Knox
- Date of birth: 1 May 1947 (age 79)
- Place of birth: Tealing, Angus, Scotland
- Position: Midfielder

Senior career*
Years	Team	Apps	(Gls)
1965	Alloa Athletic (trialist)	2	(0)
1965–1970	Forfar Athletic	173	(52)
1970–1972	St Mirren	49	(11)
1972–1976	Dundee United	57	(13)
1976	Montrose	13	(3)
1976–1980	Forfar Athletic	118	(8)
Total		412	(87)

Managerial career
- 1976–1980: Forfar Athletic
- 1983–1986: Dundee
- 1986: Aberdeen (co-manager)
- 2006–2007: Scotland U21
- 2007: Bolton Wanderers (caretaker)
- * Club domestic league appearances and goals

Archibald Gall Knox (born 1 May 1947) is a Scottish football player and coach. He was most recently the assistant manager of Aberdeen until leaving the club in March 2013.

Knox worked with Alex Ferguson as an assistant manager at Aberdeen and Manchester United, and with Walter Smith at Rangers and Everton.

== Playing career ==
As a player, Knox played in his native Scotland, featuring for Forfar Athletic (twice), St Mirren, Dundee United and a short spell with Montrose. During his time with Dundee United, Knox was a runner-up in the 1974 Scottish Cup final, his only honour as a player.

== Managerial career ==
Knox's first managerial role came in a player-manager capacity when he returned to first club Forfar in 1976, spending four years in the dual role. In 1980, Knox became assistant to Alex Ferguson at Aberdeen, helping the team to two Scottish Cups, the European Cup Winners' Cup and subsequent European Super Cup in his three years with the Dons. In 1983, Knox returned to management with Dundee, where he would spend two-and-a-half years, with a best finish of sixth place in 1984–85 and 1985–86, narrowly missing out on UEFA Cup qualification. There then followed a short spell back at Aberdeen, where he was made co-manager so Ferguson could fulfil his duties as Scotland manager. He went on to join Ferguson at Manchester United in 1986, where he stayed until April 1991. At this point, Knox came back to Scotland, becoming assistant to Walter Smith at Rangers, where the pair would enjoy six titles over the next seven years together. In July 1998, both men moved south to Everton, although their time was ended by March 2002.

It was at this point that Knox's association with the national team began, with a three-year spell assisting then-manager Craig Brown. Short spells followed at Millwall and Coventry City (as assistant to Mark McGhee and Eric Black respectively) before returning to Scotland as Richard Gough's assistant at Livingston in November 2004. Knox again assisted the national team as a coach, helping at the Kirin Cup in May 2006. Knox was appointed Scotland under-21 manager in July 2006 following Rainer Bonhof's departure. In August 2007 he was appointed as Bolton's Assistant Manager by Wanderers manager Sammy Lee. When Lee left Knox was made caretaker manager for two games (against Arsenal and in the UEFA Cup against S.C. Braga) before Gary Megson took over. Knox remained at the club under Megson.

Two days after Bolton Wanderers secured their premiership status he was axed by Megson with six other members of the coaching staff at the club. The club denied it was due to cost-cutting measures and stated it was due to Megson wanting to bring in his own staff.

On 4 July 2008 Knox was appointed as the first-team coach of Blackburn Rovers by Paul Ince. They had previously worked together at Manchester United. He became the second member of the backroom staff to be appointed by Ince; his appointment followed that of Ray Mathias as assistant manager. On 18 December 2008, Knox was relieved of his duties along with Ray Mathias following the sacking of Paul Ince and the subsequent arrival of Sam Allardyce as the new Rovers manager.

On 29 December 2009, he was appointed as the assistant manager to Craig Brown at Motherwell. On 10 December 2010, after Brown moved to Aberdeen, Knox followed him back to his former club. After three years with Brown, it announced that he and Brown would leave the club at the end of the season. Though leaving the club, Knox reversed his decision to retire, insisting he "not retiring now. I still feel young and I've plenty to offer."

In October 2013, Knox returned to Scottish Championship side Dundee as a playing scout role. Knox will be reunited with manager John Brown, whom he signed whilst manager at Dundee.

In November 2017, he was one of four inductees into the Aberdeen Hall of Fame.

== Honours ==
Individual

- Scottish Football Hall of Fame: 2018
