= Henry Hall (footballer) =

Scottish footballer and manager

Personal information
- Full name: Henry Begg Hall
- Date of birth: 22 April 1945 (age 81)
- Place of birth: Bothkennar, Scotland
- Position: Striker

Senior career*
| Years | Team | Apps | (Gls) |
- Kirkintilloch Rob Roy
| 1965–1968 | Stirling Albion | 89 | (22) |
| 1968–1975 | St Johnstone | 187 | (85) |
| 1975–1977 | Dundee United | 35 | (8) |
| 1977–1979 | Forfar Athletic | 66 | (10) |
| Total | | 376 | (125) |

International career
| 1970 | Scottish League XI | 2 | (0) |

Managerial career
- 1986: Forfar Athletic
- 2003–2005: Montrose
- * Club domestic league appearances and goals

Henry Begg Hall (born 22 April 1945) is a Scottish former football player and manager.

The peak of Hall's career as a player was when he was with for St Johnstone during the early 1970s, while Willie Ormond was manager; during this time they came third in the Scottish Football League and reached a Scottish League Cup Final. Hall made his name at Stirling Albion, and later served Dundee United and Forfar Athletic. He also managed Forfar and Montrose.

He taught physical education (PE) at Larbert High School and Falkirk High School in the early 1970s, Kirkton High School in the late 1970s and at Rockwell High School (Dundee) in the late 1970s and early 1980s. Hall worked as a youth team coach for St Johnstone between 2000 and 2002. He was made redundant in 2002 as the club cut costs after they were relegated from the Scottish Premier League.
