= Jim Henry (footballer, born 1949) =

Scottish footballer

Personal information
- Date of birth: 4 February 1949 (age 77)
- Place of birth: Dundee, Scotland
- Position: Midfielder

Youth career
- Carnoustie Panmure

Senior career*
Years	Team	Apps	(Gls)
1969–1973	Dundee United	93	(7)
1973–1976	Aberdeen	18	(0)
1976	San Antonio Thunder	18	(0)
1976–1977	Forfar Athletic	4	(1)
1977	Team Hawaii	24	(5)
1977–1980	Forfar Athletic	45	(3)

International career
1970	Scottish League XI	1	(0)
- * Club domestic league appearances and goals

James Henry (born 4 February 1949) is a Scottish former football midfielder.
