= Ian Mitchell (footballer) =

Scottish footballer

Personal information
- Date of birth: 9 May 1946
- Place of birth: Falkirk, Scotland
- Date of death: 2 April 1996 (aged 49)
- Place of death: Dundee, Scotland
- Position: Left winger

Youth career
- Woodburn Athletic

Senior career*
Years	Team	Apps	(Gls)
1962–70	Dundee United	205	(95)
1970–71	Newcastle United	3	(0)
1971–73	Dundee United	31	(7)
1973–74	Falkirk	3	(1)
1974–77	Brechin City	62	(15)
Total		304	(118)

International career
1966–1967	Scotland U23	2	(1)
- * Club domestic league appearances and goals

Ian Mitchell (9 May 1946 – 2 April 1996) was a Scottish footballer who played mainly for Dundee United and holds the record of being the youngest player ever to make a first team appearance for the club.

Mitchell was born in Falkirk. After winning schoolboy caps for Scotland, Dundee United snapped him up as a juvenile. He became a regular in the first team after a good showing in his debut, aged only sixteen. He is one of five United players to score more than 100 league goals for the club and in the top twenty appearances for the club.

In 1970, he signed for Newcastle United for £50,000 but returned to Dundee United a year later. He also had spells with Falkirk and Brechin City before retiring.

He died after a long illness at the age of 49.
