= Frank Kopel =

Scottish footballer (1949–2014)

Personal information
- Full name: Frank Kopel
- Date of birth: 28 March 1949
- Place of birth: Falkirk, Scotland
- Date of death: 16 April 2014 (aged 65)
- Place of death: Kirriemuir, Scotland
- Height: 5 ft 8 1/2 in (1.74 m)
- Position: Left back

Youth career
- 1964–1966: Manchester United

Senior career*
Years	Team	Apps	(Gls)
1966–1969	Manchester United	10	(0)
1969–1972	Blackburn Rovers	25	(0)
1972–1982	Dundee United	284	(7)
1982–1984	Arbroath	62	(1)

Managerial career
- 1982–1983: Arbroath (assistant)
- 1991–1992: Forfar Athletic (assistant)
- * Club domestic league appearances and goals

Frank Kopel (28 March 1949 – 16 April 2014) was a Scottish footballer who played as a left back. Born in Falkirk, he had an 18-year professional football career, during which he played for Manchester United, Blackburn Rovers, Dundee United and Arbroath. He then went into coaching, becoming assistant manager at Arbroath and Forfar Athletic with a spell on the Dundee United coaching staff in between.

== Career ==
Kopel was born in Falkirk and was a Scottish schoolboy international before signing for Manchester United as a schoolboy in 1964. He turned professional in 1966 and made his debut as a substitute in a 2–2 draw at home to Burnley on 9 September 1967. He made his full debut – and his only other appearance for the 1967–68 season – on 28 October 1967, playing at right-back in a 3–1 defeat away to Nottingham Forest. Kopel made a further 10 appearances for Manchester United during the 1968–69 season, including his European debut against Anderlecht on 27 November 1968, but he spent most of the season as a back-up to the club's first-choice full-backs, Shay Brennan and Tony Dunne. His final appearance for United was a 1–1 draw with Watford in the FA Cup. Almost two months later, he transferred. Kopel's record during his time at Manchester United was out of his 12 appearances, they won two, drew five and lost five.

He was sold to Blackburn Rovers for £25,000 in March 1969,. Kopel spent over two years at Blackburn before being released in December 1971.

He joined Dundee United in January 1972; the first signing made by the club's new manager Jim McLean. Kopel would remain at Tannadice for the next ten years, playing nearly 400 first team games, and picking up two League Cup and two Scottish Cup runners-up medals during his time with the Terrors.

In 1982, he moved to Arbroath as player/coach, before retiring from playing in 1984.

He returned to United to coach and his son, Scott, was an apprentice at Tannadice before making a career at Chesterfield, Brechin City and Forfar Athletic.

== Legacy ==
Kopel has a Dundee United Supporters Club named after him, Frank Kopel's Travelling Shindig. In 2011, he was inducted into Dundee United's official Hall of Fame.

== Personal life ==
Kopel married Amanda in 1969. He arranged their first date to be at a football ground later telling friends: "Well, it was a cup tie!"

He was diagnosed as suffering vascular dementia in 2008. He died at age 65 at his home in Kirriemuir on 16 April 2014. He was survived by his wife and their son, Scott. Among attendees at the service at Kirriemuir Old Parish Church were ex United teammates, Dave Narey, Paul Hegarty, Davie Dodds, Hamish McAlpine and Maurice Malpas. Also in attendance were former assistant manager Walter Smith and ex Dundee players Jocky Scott and Bobby Glennie.

Kopel is the grandfather of actor Ryan Kopel.

== Honours ==
Dundee United

- Scottish League Cup (2): 1979–80, 1980–81
