= George Fleming (footballer, born 1948) =

Scottish footballer

Personal information
- Date of birth: 22 September 1948 (age 78)
- Place of birth: Edinburgh, Scotland
- Position: Midfielder

Senior career*
Years	Team	Apps	(Gls)
1966–1972	Heart of Midlothian	132	(21)
1972–1980	Dundee United	259	(31)
1980–1983	St Johnstone	95	(1)

Managerial career
- 1983–1985: Arbroath
- * Club domestic league appearances and goals

George Fleming (born 22 September 1948) is a Scottish former footballer who played in midfield. With Dundee United he won the 1979-80 Scottish League Cup.

== Career ==
Fleming made 132 league appearances for Hearts between 1966 and 1972.

In 1972 he joined Dundee United and won the Scottish League Cup in December 1979. That was his last season at United. He made 258 league appearances for the Tayside club.

He took a player/coach role at St Johnstone from 1980 to 1983.

He subsequently managed Arbroath in the mid-1980s.

== Honours ==
- Scottish League Cup: 1

1979–80

== See also ==
- Dundee United F.C. records
