= Jackie Copland =

Scottish footballer

Personal information
- Full name: John Copland
- Date of birth: 21 March 1947 (age 79)
- Place of birth: Paisley, Scotland
- Position: Centre back

Youth career
- Kirklandneuk Juveniles

Senior career*
Years	Team	Apps	(Gls)
1967–1968	St Mirren	2	(0)
1968–1969	Beith Juniors		
1969–1970	Stranraer	34	(19)
1970–1976	Dundee United	144	(18)
1976–1983	St Mirren	201	(6)

International career
1974	Scottish Football League XI	1	(0)
- * Club domestic league appearances and goals

John "Jackie" Copland (born 21 March 1947 in Paisley) is a Scottish former footballer who played as a centre back. Copland spent most of his career with St Mirren (in two spells), Stranraer and Dundee United, retiring from football in 1983 after his second spell with the Buddies.

Since retiring, Copland continued his association with St Mirren, working in various administrative roles.

He was inducted into the St Mirren Hall of Fame in 2016.
