= Tommy Traynor (Scottish footballer) =

Scottish footballer

Personal information
- Date of birth: 27 September 1943
- Place of birth: Bonnybridge, Scotland
- Date of death: January 1993 (aged 49)
- Place of death: Melbourne, Australia
- Position: Winger

Youth career
- Dunipace Juniors

Senior career*
Years	Team	Apps	(Gls)
1962–1970	Heart of Midlothian	173	(32)
1970–1976	Dundee United	122	(15)
1975–1976	→ Morton (loan)	4	(0)
1976–1977	Falkirk	14	(0)
Total		313	(47)
- * Club domestic league appearances and goals

Thomas Traynor (27 September 1943 – January 1993) was a Scottish footballer who played as a winger. Traynor spent the majority of his career with Heart of Midlothian and Dundee United, gaining Scottish Cup runners-up medals with both, in 1968 and 1974 respectively. Traynor also had short spells with Morton and Falkirk. He was a coach with Cowdenbeath after his playing retirement before moving to Australia, where he died from a heart attack.

== Honours ==
Heart of Midlothian

- Scottish Cup finalist: 1967–68

Dundee United

- Scottish Cup finalist: 1973–74
