= Doug Smith (footballer, born 1937) =

Scottish footballer

Personal information
- Full name: Douglas Baigrie Smith
- Date of birth: 9 March 1937
- Place of birth: Aberdeen, Scotland
- Date of death: 5 December 2012 (aged 75)
- Position: Centre half

Youth career
- ?–1958: Aberdeen Lads Club

Senior career*
Years	Team	Apps	(Gls)
1958–76	Dundee United	456	(17)
1967	→ Dallas Tornado (loan)		
- * Club domestic league appearances and goals

Douglas Baigrie Smith (9 March 1937 – 5 December 2012) was a Scottish footballer who played as a centre half. Smith spent his entire senior career with Dundee United, making over 600 appearances for the club between 1959 and 1976. He later joined the club's board of directors and was chairman from 2000 until 2002.

== Early life ==
Doug Smith was born in Aberdeen, one of four brothers. Two of the others would also go on to play senior football: Dave, who played for Aberdeen, Rangers and Scotland, and Hugh, who played for Forfar Athletic and Greenock Morton.

== Playing career ==
Smith began his career with local junior team Aberdeen Lads Club, while also serving an apprenticeship as a painter and decorator. Initially a right-half, alongside Ron Yeats at centre-half, he converted to the latter position when Yeats was signed by Dundee United in 1957. After completing his apprenticeship, Smith also signed for Dundee United in 1958, where he would spend his entire senior career. With Yeats established in the first team despite being on national service, Smith initially played in the reserves, making his first team debut in September 1959 when Yeats' army duties meant he was unavailable for a midweek match.

Yeats was transferred to Liverpool in 1961, allowing Smith to establish himself in the first team, and he went to miss only four matches over the next ten seasons. He helped Dundee United become established in the top division of Scottish football, qualifying for European competition for the first time in 1966, and was part of the team that defeated Barcelona home and away in United's European debut. By the 1970–71 season, Smith had become the teams's captain and also their regular penalty taker. He captained United to the 1974 Scottish Cup Final, their first appearance in the final, where they lost 3–0 to Celtic; that runners-up medal was the closest Smith came to winning a major honour.

Smith made his final appearance for Dundee United in January 1976. In total, he appeared in 628 competitive matches for the club, never receiving a booking throughout his playing career.

== Administrative career ==
Smith returned to Dundee United in 1983, when he was invited to join the club's board of directors. In 1992, Smith was elected as vice-chairman, under chairman Jim McLean. Smith became chairman in October 2000 following McLean's resignation, although the latter retained his majority shareholding. In January 2002, a consortium involving McLean ousted the existing board at an extraordinary general meeting, leading to the end of Smith's 44-year association with the club.

As well as his club commitments, Smith served on various Scottish Football Association (SFA) and Scottish Football League (SFL) committees and was appointed as president of the SFL for a term beginning in 1997.

== Outside football and legacy ==
After retiring as a player, Smith ran the Athletic Bar, a pub near Dundee United's Tannadice Park ground. He was one of the first inductees to the Dundee United Hall of Fame in 2008. He died in Dundee on 5 December 2012, aged 75. His wife May had died earlier; the couple had three children as well as 6 grandchildren

== Honours ==
Dundee United

- Scottish Cup:
  - Runner-up: 1973–74

== See also ==
- List of one-club men in association football
- List of Scottish football families
