= Kenny Cameron =

Scottish footballer

Personal information
- Date of birth: 15 July 1943 (age 83)
- Place of birth: Perth, Scotland
- Position: Striker

Youth career
- Blairgowrie

Senior career*
Years	Team	Apps	(Gls)
1962–1967	Dundee	76	(48)
1967–1968	Kilmarnock	28	(11)
1968–1974	Dundee United	119	(63)
1974–1979	Montrose	44	(21)

Managerial career
- 1975–1979: Montrose
- 1996–1997: Dundee St Joseph's
- * Club domestic league appearances and goals

Kenny Cameron (born 15 July 1943) is a Scottish former footballer who played as striker for a number of Scottish clubs.

== Career ==
Cameron began his senior career with Dundee, for whom he scored in the 1964 Scottish Cup Final. He joined Kilmarnock and then, in 1968, Dundee United, where he managed more than a goal every two games during his six years at Tannadice, leaving in 1974 to join Montrose, whom he later managed. In 1978 Cameron managed Dundee University in the Scottish University Championships and Dundee amateur leagues. Cameron returned to Tannadice as coach, then chief scout, until leaving in 1996 (after fifteen years) to become full-time manager of junior club Dundee St Joseph's. He returned to first club Dundee to join the coaching staff at Dens Park in 1997.

== Honours ==
- Scottish Cup Runner-up

1963–64
