= Andy Rolland =

Scottish footballer

Personal information
- Full name: Andrew Rolland
- Date of birth: 12 November 1942 (age 83)
- Place of birth: Cowdenbeath, Scotland
- Position: Full back

Youth career
- 1959–1961: Cowdenbeath Royals

Senior career*
Years	Team	Apps	(Gls)
1961–1962	Cowdenbeath	7	(3)
1962–1964	Dundonald Bluebell		
1964–1967	Cowdenbeath	93	(15)
1967–1978	Dundee United	327	(33)
1978	Fort Lauderdale Strikers	15	(0)
1978	Los Angeles Aztecs	12	(0)
1978–1980	Dunfermline Athletic	42	(8)
1980–1982	Cowdenbeath	78	(7)
Total		574	(66)

International career
1976	Scottish Football League XI	1	(0)

Managerial career
- 1980–1982: Cowdenbeath
- * Club domestic league appearances and goals

Andy Rolland (born 12 November 1942 in Cowdenbeath) is a Scottish former footballer who played as a right back.

== Career ==
Rolland began his senior career in 1961 with Cowdenbeath but was released at the end of the season. After a spell in junior football, he returned to Central Park in 1964 and remained for three seasons, before a £10,000 move to Dundee United in 1967. Rolland played at Tannadice for eleven seasons, picking up a Scottish Cup runners-up medal and making some 429 competitive appearances, putting him in the top ten for United players. In summer 1978, Rolland moved to the US to play in the North American Soccer League, featuring for Fort Lauderdale Strikers and Los Angeles Aztecs, the latter involving a swap deal for George Best. Rolland returned to Scotland after the summer and signed for Dunfermline, where he scored the all-important penalty in the last game of the 1978–79 season v Falkirk to secure promotion for The Pars as runners up to Berwick Rangers Midway through 1980–81, Rolland returned to Cowdenbeath for a third spell, becoming player/manager shortly afterwards. During that season, Rolland missed the all-important penalty in a match which denied Cowden promotion. Rolland left the club in March 1982, and later returned to junior football at the age of 40 with Leven Juniors.

Although Rolland never appeared for Scotland, he was selected for the Scottish League team against the Football League at Hampden in 1976. This was the final of these matches, as this occasion drew less than 9,000 spectators.

== Honours ==
- Scottish Cup Runner-up

1973–74

== See also ==
- List of footballers in Scotland by number of league appearances (500+)
