= Ormond (surname) =

Ormond or Ormand is an old surname, originated in Ireland (Ormonde) and Scotland (Ormond), but also occurring in England, Wales, Australia, New Zealand, United States, Portugal (mainly in Azores, as a variation of the Scottish surname Drummond) and Brazil.

The Irish surname derives from the Irish toponym Oirmhumhain 'East Munster' and was a hereditary title within the Irish aristocracy.

However, the Scottish Ormonds originate from the county of Angus, where the Douglas family held the title of earl of Ormond, deriving from their ownership of Ormond Castle in Avoch, on the Black Isle in the Scottish Highlands. The Ormond surname is rumoured to have been taken up by an illegitimate son of the earl in the 15th or 16th century. The earliest Ormond in Angus to feature on the parish records is Elspit Ormond, born 1617 in Monikie, the daughter of James Ormond.

The name can vary in spelling in old texts (as is typical of the English language generally). However the spelling Ormond is specific to the earldom, while Ormonde with an e is specific to the dukedom.

There is also an Ormond family in Pembrokeshire, Wales, which is of great antiquity. David Ormond is the first recorded Ormond in Pembrokeshire, who was a church rector recorded in Narberth in 1386, Pembroke in 1397 and Manorbier in 1415. The National Archives hold the will of Owen Ormond of Pembrokeshire, which was proved in 1610, and he is listed owning land in Wolfsdale, Pembrokeshire, in 1580, as reported in a Grant by Sir John Perrot of Haroldston, in the County of Pembroke, Knight. Their origin in Wales likely was connected to the Flemish Marches (according to research on the family done in 1922 by the Royal College of Heralds, researching a pedigree for Sir Herbert John Ormond of Stoke Newington), being English in the South of Wales, coming to England originally with the Norman Conquest as mercenary soldiers under William of Normandy in the 11th Century, with some coming in later centuries. This Ormond family may have originated as "Ormont," meaning "gold mountain," given this Flemish origin. Some family traditions also claim the family was a merchant family originally from the "Ormont-Dessous" region of Switzerland, going to Flanders in the 5th or 6th Centuries, although there is no written evidence supporting this.

In Portugal, the surname traces back to Sir John Drummond, son of Sir John Drummond of Carghill and Stobhall, who left Scotland in 1418, set off for France and from there to the kingdom of Granada (Spain) to fight against the moors, and later he set off for the island of Madeira (Portugal). Francisco Ferreira Drummond (b. Madeira, 1580, d. Azores, 1615) migrated to the island of Terceira in the Azores archipelago (Portugal), where he established his residence in Ribeira Seca, part of the town of S. Sebastião. From this date onwards, the surname Drummond undergoes various corruptions, such as 'Armond' and 'de Ormonde', eventually consolidating into the form 'Ormond' in Brazil. The oldest record would be of 1691 (Manuel Machado Ormonde). Their descendants also emigrated mainly to Rio de Janeiro (Brazil) and California (USA).

== People ==
- Andrew Ormond, Irish hurler
- Bert Ormond (1931–2017), New Zealand footballer
- Brian Ormond (born 1979), Irish television presenter
- Charles L. Ormond (1932–2017), American politician
- Danny Ormand, American law enforcement officer
- Duncan Ormond (born 1950), New Zealand footballer
- Francis Ormond (1827–1889), Australian politician
- George Ormond (1889–1980), Scottish footballer
- Gibby Ormond (1933–2010), Scottish footballer
- Guillaume Ormond (1896–1971), English cathedral organist
- Henry Ormond (1901–1973), German judge and lawyer
- Herbert Ormond (1867–1934), English draper and politician
- Ian Ormond (1949–2021), New Zealand footballer
- Jack Ormond (1891–1970), New Zealand politician and rugby union footballer, better known as Tiaki Omana
- Jackson Ormond (born 1990), New Zealand rugby union player
- James Ormond (administrator) (died 1497), Lord Treasurer of Ireland
- James Ormond (alpine skier) (born 1973), British alpine skier
- Jimmy Ormond (born 1977), English cricketer
- Joan Ormond (died 1507), wife of John Ormond, esquire
- John Davies Ormond (1831–1917), New Zealand politician
- John James Ormond (1795–1866), American judge
- John Kelso Ormond (1886–1978), American urologist
- John Ormond (1923–1990), Welsh poet and film-maker
- John Ormond (farmer) (1905–1995), New Zealand farmer, businessman, and politician
- Julia Ormond (born 1965), English actress
- Lewis Ormond (born 1994), New Zealand rugby union player
- Mary Ormond (c. 1702 – c. 1759), Supposed wife of Blackbeard
- Paul Ormond (born 1977), Irish hurler and Gaelic footballer
- Richard Louis Ormond (born 1939), British art historian
- Roger Ormond (1740–1775), North Carolinian statesman
- Ron Ormond (1910–1981), American filmmaker and showman
- Saint Ormond, French saint of the 6th-century Catholic church; feastday 23 January; elected Abbot of St. Maire c. 587
- Sophie Ormond (born 1979), British alpine skier
- Vicki Ormond (born 1982), New Zealand footballer
- Wayne Ormond (businessman) (born 1973), Australian entrepreneur and businessman
- Wayne Ormond (rugby union) (born 1977), New Zealand rugby union player
- Willie Ormond (1927–1984), Scottish footballer and manager
- Willie Ormond (footballer, born 1926) (1926–1992), Scottish footballer

== See also ==
- Ormond (disambiguation)
- Earl of Ormond (Ireland)
- Earl of Ormond (Scotland)
- Ormonde (surname)
