= Ormond =

Ormond may refer to:

== People ==
- Ormond (surname)
- Earl of Ormond (Ireland)
- Earl of Ormond (Scotland)
- Ormond Somerville (1868–1928), justice of the Supreme Court of Alabama
- Ormond Wilson (1907–1988), New Zealand politician

== Places ==
Ireland

- Ormond (ancient Irish kingdom), in the province of Munster
- Two baronies in North Tipperary
  - Ormond Upper
  - Ormond Lower
- Ormonde Castle, an Irish castle, from 1315 home of the Butler family
- Birr Aerodrome, the Ormand flying club

Scotland

- Ormond Castle, a Scottish castle, home of the Douglas family

England

- Great Ormond Street Hospital, a children's hospital in London

United States

- Ormond Beach, Oxnard, California, a portion of the California coastline
- Ormond Beach, Florida, a city in Florida
  - Ormond Beach Middle School, a middle school located in the city of Ormond Beach
  - Ormond Beach Municipal Airport, An airport close to Ormond Beach
  - Ormond Yacht Club, a yacht club of Ormond Beach, Florida
- Ormond-By-The-Sea, Florida, a city in Florida
- Ormond Plantation House, Historic plantation house in St. Charles, Parish, LA
- Ormond Memorial Art Museum and Gardens, art museum in Ormond Beach, Florida

Australia

- Ormond College, a residential college of The University of Melbourne
- Ormond, Victoria, a suburb of Melbourne, Australia
  - Ormond railway station, in the suburb
  - Ormond Primary School, Ormond, Victoria
  - Ormond Amateur Football Club

New Zealand

- Ormond, New Zealand, a small settlement inland from Gisborne

== Others ==
- Ormond Pursuivant, Scottish officer of arms.
- Ormond's disease, Retroperitoneal fibrosis named for Dr. John Kelso Ormond
- Ormond (novel), a book by Maria Edgeworth
- Ormond Hotel, at one time the largest wooden building in the world
- Ormond (steam automobile company), 1904–1905
- Ormond; or, the Secret Witness, a 1799 novel by Charles Brockden Brown
- Ormond Shops, American women's apparel retailer, 1933–1994

== See also ==
- Ormonde (disambiguation)
