= Jesse Aaron =

American sculptor (1887–1979)

Jesse James Aaron
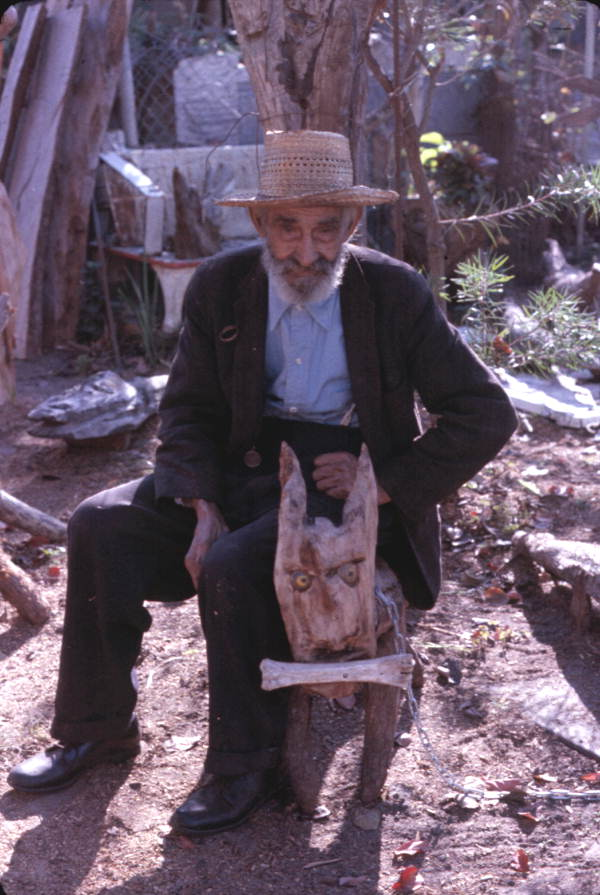
- Aaron with one of his works, 1976
- Born: June 10, 1887; Lake City, Florida, U.S.
- Died: October 17, 1979 (aged 92); Alachua, Florida, U.S.
- Occupations: Sculptor; Wood carver
- Spouse: Lee Anna Jenkins (m. 1912)
- Children: 1

Jesse James Aaron (June 10, 1887 – October 17, 1979) was an American sculptor and wood carver. His work is held in the permanent collections of several museums including the High Museum of Art and the Smithsonian Museum of American Art.

== Early life ==
Jesse Aaron was born on June 10, 1887, in Lake City, Florida and was born into a mixed race family descending from a Seminole grandmother and parents of African and European descent. He was the oldest of twelve children. His formal education ended in the first grade when his parents removed him from school to hire him out as a farm-laborer for seven dollars per month. He continued sporadic agricultural labor until 1908 when he attended a technical college for his baking certification. From that point onwards, Aaron began working as a cook for the Seaboard Coast Line Railroad system, operated several bake shops, cooked for Hotel Thomas in Gainesville, Florida, and then for various hospitals and fraternities later in his career. When he could not find work cooking, he worked in cabinetmaking, which gave him the skills and inspiration for woodcarving and sculpture. At age 21, Aaron interned with a local bakery and then worked in several bakeries.

== Career ==
According to Aaron, desperation and divine intervention inspired him to carve wood. In 1968, after selling his farm to fund his wife's cataract operation, Aaron still did not have enough money to fully fund her surgery. As he recounted, at three o'clock in the morning on July 5, Aaron awoke to the voice of God commanding him to carve wood. This inspiration offered solutions both to Lee Anna's desperate need for surgery and Aaron's unemployment after losing his nursery. Thus, at 81 years old, Aaron began a new career as a sculptor.

Aaron's first carvings were on the trees surrounding his home in Gainesville. Aaron believed these trees and their carved faces to be protective. Aaron's first stand-alone carvings were carved from soft kindling wood that he got from a neighbor. Later, his more anthropomorphic wood sculptures, with their characteristically large, yellow eyes, would be sourced from the woods and swamps surrounding his property.

=== Process and materials ===
Aaron had a similar artistic process to other southern African American wood carvers of the mid-twentieth century, such as Bessie Harvey, Ralph Griffin, Archie Byron, Elijah Pierce, and Ulysses Davis. Aaron would walk the swamp and forest to collect pieces of wood in which "he could bring forth human and animal shapes that, to him if not to anyone else, already existed." For the artist, there was a distinct difference between inspired and uninspired material and the power of distinguishing the two lay in his communion with God. He described his process by saying "I can see faces on anything. I can look at a tree stump and I know just how is gonna look 'fore I start, it all depends on what God has put there in the wood." Towards the end of his life, he would experience arthritic pain that prevented him from harvesting his own wood. Fruitlessly, he hired college students to help him source wood, complaining, "These guys don't know what to look for. They can't see it. Most of the time, what they bring to me I can't see nothing in it."

Aaron most often worked with untreated hardwoods, such as cedar and cypress, which are native to Florida and bug-resistant. He began by roughly shaping them with a chainsaw, then refined the pieces with hammers, chisels, and other hand-tools. He never painted, stained, or varnished the sculptures, but would often burn the surface of the wood to enhance color and texture. He created his iconic, large, aghast, yellow eyes from polyester resin. He also attached found objects, bones, old pipes, rusted guns, and hats to his pieces to further animate them.

His work ranged from pocket-sized sculptures to works on tree trunks. Although it is difficult to estimate how many carvings were completed in his short eleven-year working period, several hundred examples of his work have survived, making it likely that he completed many more pieces than that.

=== Acclaim ===
Approximately one month after Aaron began carving and displaying his work in his front yard, Stuart R. Purser, a professor of art at the University of Florida, stumbled upon his work. He arranged a visit with the artist and was quickly taken by Aaron's prowess. In October 1968, Purser organized Aaron's first solo exhibition at the University of Florida. Two years later, with the attention of University of Florida art historian and curator Roy Craven, Aaron had another gallery opening at the university. As Craven recalls, the gallery opened at 1:00 pm and all of Aaron's work was sold by 2:30 pm.

In 1975, Aaron was awarded the Visual Arts Fellowship from the National Endowment for the Arts.

== Personal life and death ==
Shortly after becoming a certified baker, Aaron met Lee Anna Jenkins, a school teacher, whom he would marry in 1912 and together raise one daughter, Ida Aaron Wells (1913 - 2006). In the early 1930s, Aaron built a home for his family in Gainesville, Florida, where he lived for the rest of his life. In the mid-1960s he bought three acres of land east of Gainesville and created his own farm and nursery there. He sold flowers and seedlings from the nursery to supplement his income.

In 1968, Aaron was forced to sell the nursery to pay for his wife's cataract surgery, which Aaron still lacked the money after selling the nursery to fully pay for her cataract surgery and so could only partially pay for this. Aaron met Lennie Kesl in the 1970s and the two became friends.

Aaron suffered from arthritis. He died on October 17, 1979, in Alachua, Florida, and Lee Anna died on December 25, 1985.

== Exhibitions ==
- Wood Sculpture by Jesse J. Aaron. 14 Oct - 3 Nov, 1970, University of Florida, College of Architecture and Fine Arts, Gainesville, FL.
- Black Folk Art in America, 1930-1980. 15 Jan- 28 Mar, 1982, Corcoran Gallery of Art, Washington (D.C.)
- Outside the Main Stream: Folk Art in Our Time, May- Aug 1988, High Museum of Art at Georgia-Pacific Center, Atlanta, GA.
- Unsigned, Unsung.. Whereabouts Unknown!: Make-Do Art of the American Outlands. 5 Feb- 7 Mar, 1993, Florida State University Art Gallery and Museum, Tallahassee, FL.
- Passionate Visions of the American South: Self-Taught Artists from 1940 to the Present, 23 Oct 1993- 30 Jan 1994, New Orleans Museum of Art, New Orleans, LA.
- Southern Spirit: The Hill Collection, 21 Feb- 31 Mar, 2000, Museum of Art, Tallahassee, FL.
- The Sculpture of Jesse Aaron. 9 Sep- 4 Nov 2000, Zora Neale Hurston National Museum of Fine Arts, Eatonville, FL.
- A Return to January '82: The Corcoran Show Revisited, 22 Jan- 16 Mar, 2002, Luise Ross Gallery, New York, NY.
- Southern Folk: Self-Taught Artists, 15 Nov, 2002- 5 Jan, 2003, Ormond Memorial Art Museum and Gardens, Ormond Beach, FL.
- Coming Home: Self-Taught Artists, the Bible and the American South. 19 Jun- 13 Nov, 2004, Art Museum of the University of Memphis, Memphis, TN.
- Stories of Community: Self-Taught Art from the Hill Collection. 12 Aug- 30 Oct, 2004, Museum of Arts and Sciences, Macon, GA.
- Amazing Grace: Self-Taught Artists from the Mullis Collection. 29 Sep, 2007- 6 Jan, 2008, Georgia Museum of Art, University of Georgia, Athens, GA.
- Confluence / Tree of Life. 27 May- 20 Sep 2016, Galleries at the Historic Thomas Center, Gainesville, FL.
- Cosmologies from the Tree of Life: Art from the African American South, 8 Jun- 17 Nov 2019, Virginia Museum of Fine Arts, Richmond, VA.
- In the Presence of Our Ancestors: Southern Perspectives in African American Art. December 12, 2020 to December 5, 2021. Minneapolis Institute of Art. Minneapolis, MN.

== Collections ==
- Harn Museum of Art
- High Museum of Art
- Fine Arts Museums of San Francisco
- Minneapolis Institute of Art
- Virginia Museum of Fine Arts
- Smithsonian American Art Museum
