= Wayne Ormond =

Wayne Ormond may refer to:

- Wayne Ormond (businessman) (born 1973), Australian entrepreneur and businessman.
- Wayne Ormond (rugby union) (born 1977), New Zealand rugby union player.
