= James Ormond =

James Ormond or Ormonde may refer to:

- Jimmy Ormond (born 1977), English cricketer
- James Ormond (administrator) (died 1497), Lord High Treasurer of Ireland, 1492–1494
- James Ormond (alpine skier) (born 1973), British alpine skier
- James Ormonde (Australian politician) (1903–1970), Australian politician
