= Sumner Hale Gove =

American architect

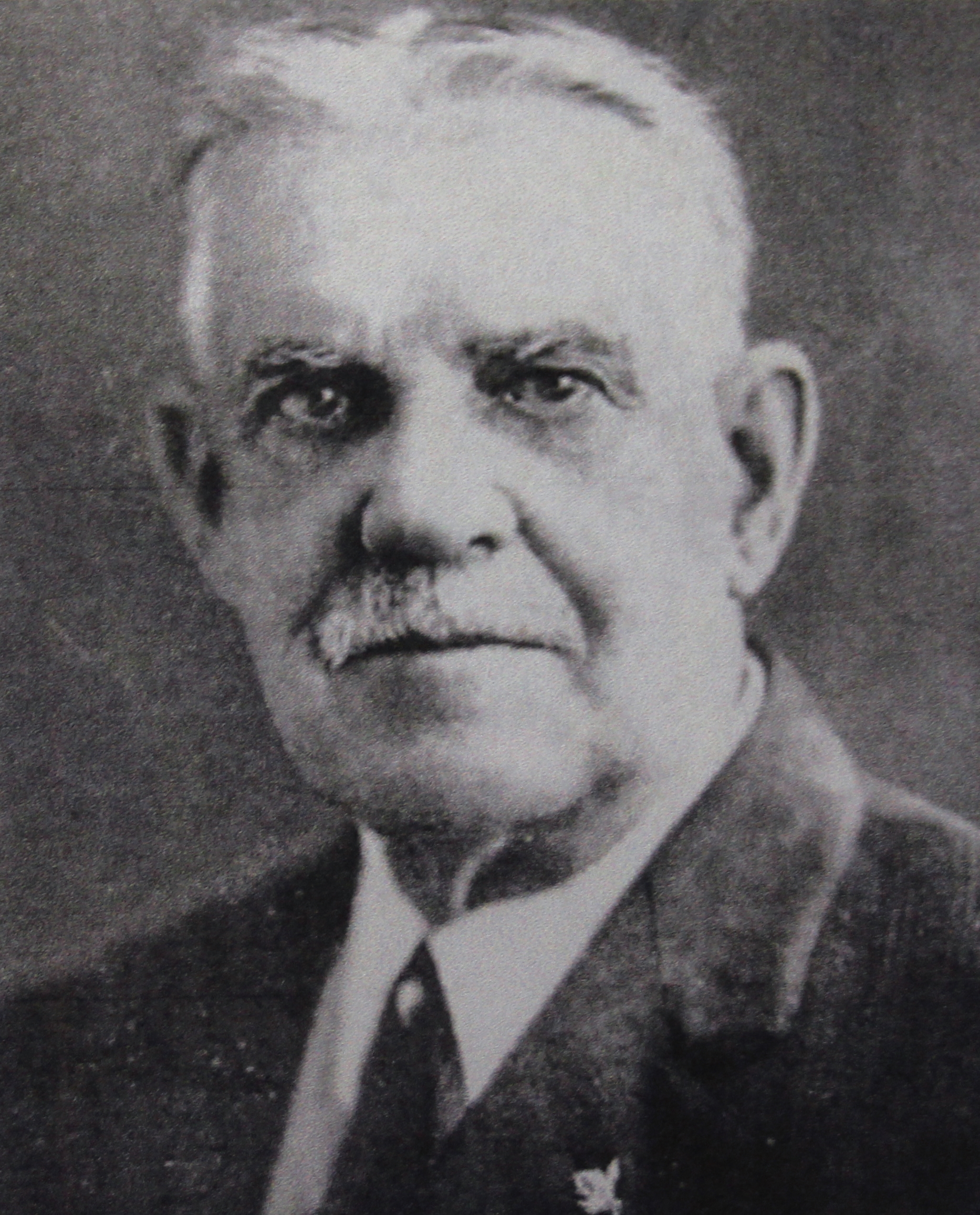
Circa 1920 photo of Sumner Hale Gove.

Sumner Hale Gove (c. 1853–1926) was an American businessman, politician, and prolific developer and architect. During the early 1880s, he was employed as a carpenter and builder in the Groton, Connecticut area. In 1882, he served as a member of the Connecticut General Assembly.

== Early life ==
Gove was born in Lynn, Massachusetts, as the ninth child of Worthen Augustus and Emeline Augusta (Spencer) Gove. He graduated from grammar school at the age of 14 and went to work for Louis Agassiz in Cambridge, Massachusetts. By 16 he was apprenticed in carpentry in Nahant. At the age of 19 married to Caroline Baker in Newport, Rhode Island, before returning to Nahant. After the passing of his father-in-law, Gove and Caroline came to Groton Connecticut, where Gove took up the contracting business, building many buildings & residences in the New London Connecticut area. Gove also served one term on the Connecticut State Legislature in 1881-82. He was the superintendent for Maxson & Company at Westerly, Rhode Island, where he had built some of the first buildings in that area and also Watch Hill. He resided there about 4 & a half years.

== Daytona, Florida ==
In 1883, he and his first wife, Caroline Baker, relocated to Daytona, Florida. They believed that the milder climate would relieve Caroline's asthma. Caroline died in 1910.

In 1891, Gove started businesses as an architect, builder, developer and supplier of construction materials in the Daytona, Florida area. By the 1910s, Gove was one of Daytona's leading citizens and businessmen. He ran for City Council in Daytona, winning the election and serving as its president. He then served as Mayor of Daytona for 10 years. He engineered much of Daytona Beach, including 3 mile bridge and the Bridge to Port Orange. He was the president of the East Florida Telephone Company, and managed three bridge companies (Daytona, Halifax and Peninsula). He was also the co-founder and president of the Halifax River Yacht Club, and vice-president of the Florida East Coast Automobile Association.

== Developer and architect ==
As an architect, Gove designed important residential and commercial properties that had a major influence on the physical character of the Daytona, Florida area. His architectural influences in the late 1800s was Neoclassical, Shingle and Victorian styles. During the early 1900s he adapted to changing building trends and was influenced by Mediterranean Revival styles.

In 1909, Gove contracted with the ketchup maker, Thomas A. Snider, and built a group of California-style bungalows on the northeast corner of South Street and Ridgewood Avenue in Daytona.

His residential buildings include the Siems house, the Thomas H. White house at 426 South Beach Street, Daytona (which later served as the YWCA), the Conrad and Anthony Blocks, the Charles Nichols House, the Charles G. Burgoyne House on Beach Street in Daytona Beach, the Delos A. Blodgett House at 404 Ridgewood Avenue, Daytona Beach (now listed on the National Register of Historic Places), and the MacDonald House at 38 E. Granada Blvd., Ormond Beach, FL. In Nassau Bahama he was supervisor of the building of hotels for Henry M. Flager. He also was behind buildings for John D. Rockefeller & Daytona High School and many buildings on Halifax Ave and for the British government the public market. After being there about 3 years, he returned to Daytona & built the Electric & Ice plant, several hotels and many residences, both there and at Ormond, Fl. He was the superintendent of the electric plant & telephone, and also manager for 16 years of the 4 bridges, 3 in Daytona & one at Port Orange, which he built, all about a mile long. He opened 2 sub-divisions to Daytona; sold out one, which is all built up & held the other. As a city politician he set up the tax system in town. Gove was a Freemason and a Shriner. He was the President of the Florida East Coast Automobile Association during the Daytona heyday of the early auto racers and makers established racing at the famous Daytona beach, the finest in the world. He now did all of John D. Rockefeller's building at Ormond & making his plans in all parts of the United States. He belonged to the Registered Architects Association in Florida.

Gove married, 1st, Caroline, daughter of Humphrey & Lucy (Stoddard) Baker of Groton, Conn., Sept. 27, 1873. She was born in Groton Jan. 21, 1850; & died at Daytona Nov. 30, 1910. He married, 2nd, Anna Nellie, daughter of Nelson Newton & Mary Ann (Brown) Bailey of Daytona Feb. 18, 1911. He also was the director of the Equitable Building & Loan Association of Daytona.

His commercial buildings include the Rexall Building, Clarendon Hotel, Colonnades Hotel, Ridgewood Hotel, Deland High School, Halifax Yacht Club, an addition onto the Ormond Hotel and the Ormond Yacht Club Building (now listed on the National Register of Historic Places). He also built the first Port Orange and Seabreeze bridges across the Halifax River.

== Boating interests ==
Gove designed and built his personal house on Anita Avenue in Daytona, Florida in 1912. It originally included a boat house and private slip to the east which provided direct access to the Halifax River. He participated in business investments with another prominent developer and architect in Daytona, Charles A. Ballough, and collaborated with him on the construction of the Clarendon Hotel. In 1915, Gove and Ballough filed a patent for the design of a “Submarine Vessel.”

== Death ==
On October 27, 1926, Sumner H. Gove died in Daytona Beach at the age of 73. He is buried along his first wife and several children in Pinewood Cemetery in Daytona Beach.
