= Moseley House Museum =

Building in Eatonville, Florida, USA

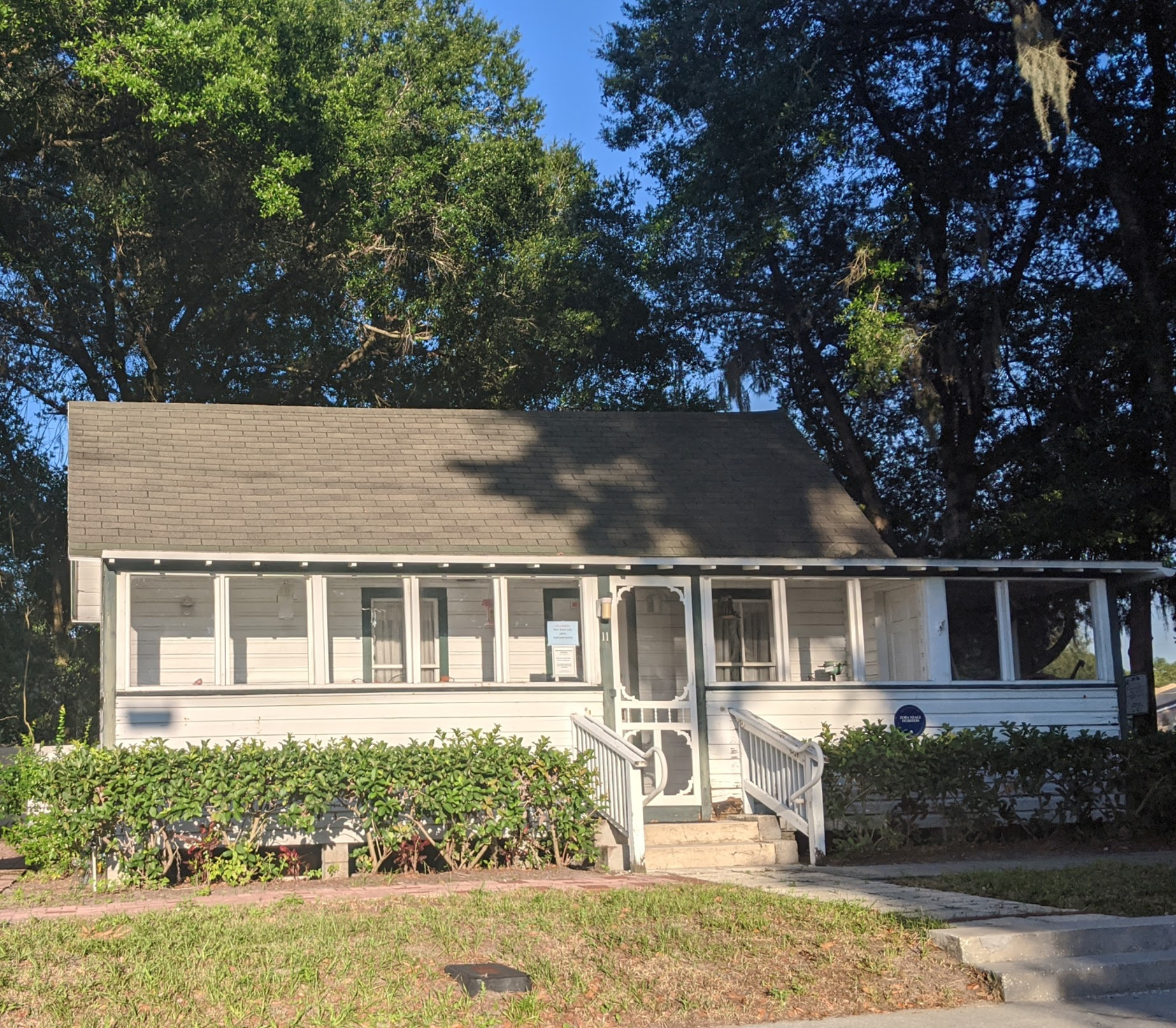
- The Mosely House
- Interactive map of the Moseley House Museum area

General information
- Location: 11 Taylor Ave; Eatonville, FL 32751
- Coordinates: 28°37′05″N 81°22′34″W
- Construction started: 1888

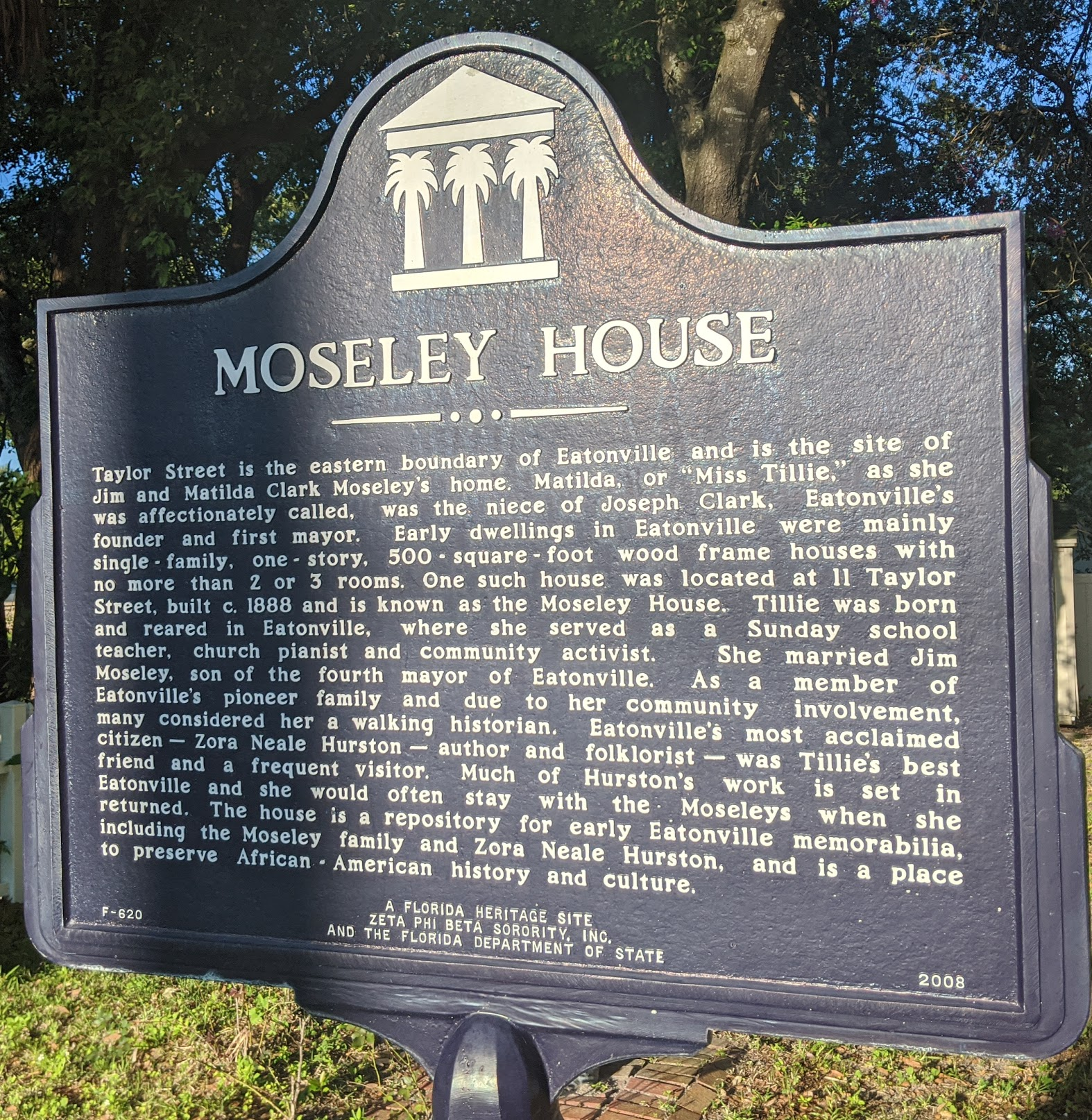
Mosely House marker

Moseley House Museum is a house museum located in Eatonville, Florida. The house is the second oldest structure in the town, constructed in 1888. The house was owned by Jim and Matilda Clark Moseley, Matilda was the niece of Eatonville's founder and first mayor. Author Zora Neale Hurston was a friend of Matilda and often visited the house. The house was restored and opened as a museum in 2000. It currently exhibits early Eatonville memorabilia.
