= Gibby Ormond =

Scottish footballer (1933–2010)

Personal information
- Full name: Gilbert McNaughton Ormond
- Date of birth: 11 September 1933
- Place of birth: Falkirk, Scotland
- Date of death: 2010 (aged 76–77)
- Position: Left winger

Senior career*
Years	Team	Apps	(Gls)
- Kilsyth Rangers
1957–1960	Airdrieonians	65	(21)
1960–1962	Dundee United	44	(7)
1962–1964	Cowdenbeath	38	(22)
1964–1965	Alloa Athletic	29	(13)
Total		176	(63)

International career
1958	Scottish League XI	2	(1)
- * Club domestic league appearances and goals

Gilbert McNaughton Ormond (12 September 1933 – 2010) was a Scottish footballer who played as a left winger for Airdrieonians, Dundee United, Cowdenbeath and Alloa Athletic in the Scottish Football League.

Ormond joined Dundee United from Airdrieonians in February 1960, scoring on his debut against Albion Rovers. He was an ever-present in the team for the rest of the season as United won promotion from Division Two. After promotion to the top division, Ormond played regularly during the 1960–61 season, missing only four matches, but featured less often the following season after United signed Neil Mochan. He was released in May 1962 and joined Cowdenbeath.

In April 1960, Ormond was chosen to play for a Second Division Select against the Scotland under-23 team in an international trial match at Brockville Park in Falkirk, missing a penalty in a 3–1 defeat.

He was the younger brother of Scotland player and manager Willie Ormond. Another brother, Bert Ormond, emigrated and represented New Zealand at international level in 1962.
