= Robert Hungerford Preparatory High School =

Robert Hungerford Normal and Industrial School campus
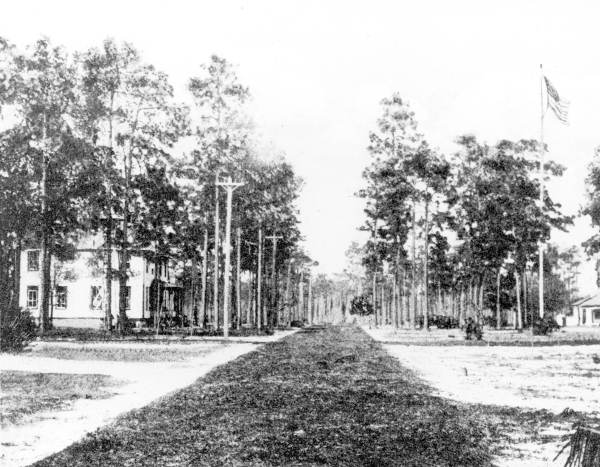
- school campus

Location
- Eatonville, Florida; 28.617164°N 81.3861955°W

Information
- Founded: 1897
- Founder: Russell C. Calhoun
- Closed: 2010
- Campus size: 160 acres (65 ha)
- Last updated: 29 December 2017

Robert Hungerford Preparatory High School was a segregated high school for African Americans in Eatonville, Florida.

== Early history ==
The original name of the school was the Robert Hungerford Normal and Industrial School and it was founded by Professor and Mrs. Russell C. Calhoun in 1897. Eatonville was the first African American town to incorporate in the United States. The school was closed in 2009.

Both the professor and his wife attended the Tuskegee Institute, of which the husband was a graduate. In the spring of 1898, along with the help of friends and relatives, Mr. E C. Hungerford donated to the school 160 acres (65 ha) of land. Mr. Hungerford of Chester, Connecticut owned a winter home in nearby Maitland, Florida. The land was donated in memory of his late doctor son, Robert, who died due to yellow fever. Robert had cared for a sick African American boy who no one else would help, even when Robert himself became ill.

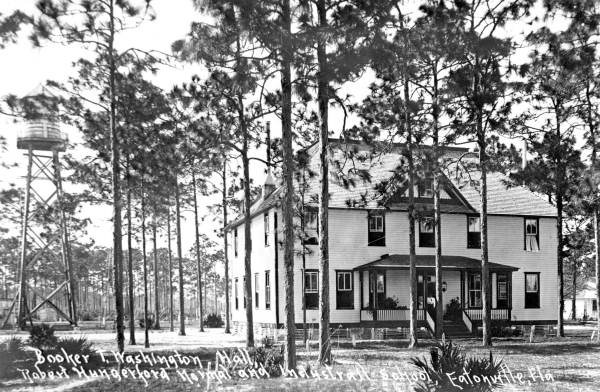
Booker T. Washington Hall

The groundwork for the school was possible thanks to donors not only from Florida, but throughout the country. The first cash donation for Hungerford was given by Miss Mary Brown of Winter Park, and the second was $400 was through Booker T. Washington of Tuskegee. The first building was named Booker T. Washington Hall.

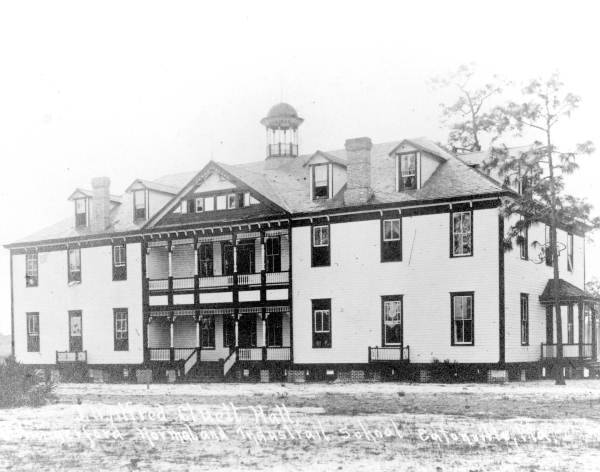
JH Alfred Cluett Hall

Later on Mr. George B. Cluett, a manufacturer in Troy, New York donated $8,000 towards the construction of a second building named J.H. Alfred Cluett Hall. An additional $4,000 was given towards the purchase of an orange grove near campus. Although Cluett Hall was burned in 1922, it was replaced by a stone structure bearing the same name only a year and a half later. Cluett also contributed a major sum towards the dining hall, which he himself insisted be named Calhoun Hall. Additionally, he gave $500 annually towards expenses for a number of years.

== Boarding school ==
By 1927, the school had expanded significantly. Originally only able to support a handful of students, the school now had over 100 boarding pupils, a number of day students, and also carried night classes for adults. A private school, Hungerford required each citizen to make personal arrangements in order to attend the institution. By 1938, Orange County began making arrangements for 19 African American High School students of Winter Park to attend Hungerford, and commuted daily to the school by bus. These "day students" did not pay tuition. Hungerford was a private school, offering grades 6 through 12 with dorms for both girls and boys. The institution was equipped with a "dining hall, chapel, library, manual training shops, laundry, home economics laboratory, barn, farm land and facilities for teaching business subjects."(Hall) It embraced both college preparatory and vocational, including subjects such as English, Latin, history, general science, biology, algebra, geometry, manual training (industrial arts), and home economics. The school also taught typing, bookkeeping, agriculture and physical education.

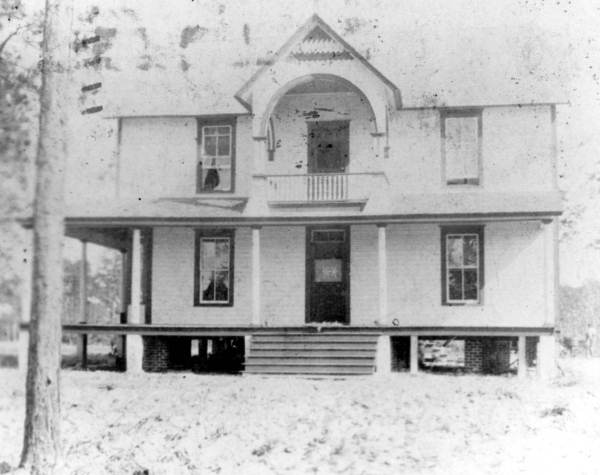
"Palms" - the principal's house

As the 20th century progressed, classes in technical subjects such as mechanical drawing and radio were added. As for extracurricular activities, Hungerford took part in interschool sports, such as football, basketball and track. To instill responsibility, students were assigned "jobs and chores" outside of the classroom. These tasks involved helping maintain the school's dairy, chicken coops, gardens, classrooms and dormitories. To give back to the communities of Eatonville and Winter Park for their involvement, it had weekly Sunday afternoon Choral Concerts that were open to the public.

== Struggle for control ==
For the 1947-48 school year, the number of boarding students had declined seriously and "day students" outnumbered boarders 5-1. Orange County Public Schools (OCPS) began paying teachers and custodians before agreeing to pay rent for the buildings. The Hungerford trustees, who were court-appointed and had no direct connection to Eatonville or the school, contacted the Florida Department of Education for help. They spoke to the "Director for Negro Education" who advised them to find a church to take over operations or sell to OCPS and become a public school. The trustees began discussions with Presbyterian Church in the United States of America. After two years of talks, the church declined. A trustee meeting was called and the trustees voted to begin working on the OCPS takeover plan, which took just eight weeks. A coalition of Constance Hungerford Fenske, daughter of the school's namesake; Mary McLeod Bethune, founder of Bethune-Cookman School; and John Mott, 1946 Nobel Peace Prize recipient came together to suggest an alternative to the sale. Their proposal would keep Hungerford a private black boarding school affiliated with Bethune-Cookman and replace the existing trustees. It did not provide a financial plan but suggested that publicity would attract enough students to justify its operation.

Just two weeks after the church's decision, the group met with the Hungerford trustees, who refused to even consider their proposal. Fenske's lawyers wrote, “Although but a few days had passed since the trustees’ decision to negotiate with the School Board, they informed the Bethune-Cookman people that they had already made a commitment to give Hungerford to the County School Board and could not entertain the proposition of Bethune-Cookman.”
The coalition met with the OCPS representatives separately. No documentation of that meeting was made available, but the School Board passed a resolution concluding that OCPS would be the best provider of education to Central Florida's Black students.
Bethune-Cookman's president, Richard V. Moore met with the Hungerford trustees on March 18, 1950. After hearing the presentation, they concluded that the plan did not meet the needs of Hungerford and voted to give the school to OCPS.

=== Lawsuit ===
A court order was required to transfer property from a public trust to the Orange County Schools. Lawyers for Constance Hungerford Fenske opposed the sale in several briefs filed with the court. The dispute finally went to the Florida Supreme Court. Newspapers at the time downplayed the battle as a “friendly suit” necessary to resolve “legal technicalities” but the court case lasted almost two years.

=== The judge ===
John Mathews was a Georgia-born lawyer who moved to Jacksonville, Florida in 1916 and opened a practice. He became involved in politics and was elected to the Florida House of Representatives from 1928 to 1932. He was elected to the Florida Senate in 1942 and was unsuccessful in his effort to exclude blacks from voting in the 1947 Democratic primary. Mathews stated that if his bill did not pass, it would put “southern civilization, southern ideals and southern institutions... at stake.” He opposed desegregation at the University of Florida and was defeated in his bid for senate re-election in 1950, partly because of black voter turnout. He was friends with Florida Governor Fuller Warren who appointed Mathews to the Florida Supreme Court in 1951. Mathews was vocal in his opposition to Brown v. Board of Education in 1954. Defending himself, Mathews stated, “I have been referred to as a negro hater. No man in this senate has any more love for the negro race than I.”

=== Decision ===
Supreme Court Justice John Mathews’ opinion in Fenske v. Coddington argued Hungerford could no longer exist as a private school because it lacked money and enough Black students “desiring a high-class boarding school” to remain open. He stated that (in 1897) “there was a real need for a private boarding school for negros” but “since that time, conditions have radically changed in Florida and throughout the south.”

== Land trust ==
The Hungerford campus had grown to 300 acres (120 ha) in 1950 and was held in trust for the school. That land was almost 40% of the town of Eatonville. When Orange County Public Schools purchased the campus in 1951, they got 11 buildings and 300 acres of land that had been appraised at more than $220,000, paying just over $16,000. However, the land transaction included a stipulation that it be used "for the education of Black children".

Interstate 4 was constructed in the 1960s, splitting the Hungerford property into two parcels. Beginning in the 1970s, OCPS cited the highway as justification when petitioning the courts to reduce the number of acres required to be used for the education of black children from 300 to 100 acres. OCPS has received almost $8 million from those sales. The remaining 100 acres (40 ha) parcel was appraised in 2019 for $20 million, but the OCPS announced their intention to sell the land to a developer for $14 million on March 31, 2023. The plans include a "new community" of 350 homes, apartments, retail businesses and restaurants. Existing residents claim the new development would wipe out the historic community and violate the land agreement, so locals are in a fight with the school board.

=== Sale controversy ===
Few current residents of Eatonville were aware of the controversy surrounding the 1950 Hungerford School property sale until the Orlando Sentinel published an article detailing the events of that time. When questioned about the 1950 opposition to the sale, the OCPS spokesperson brushed it off saying the issue was not “new information”, just “repeated rehashing, second-guessing and attempts to twist a decision from 73 years ago.” However, the school board representative for Eatonville claimed that she was unaware of that history and “certainly an important part of this whole process and it’s not something that should be denied.”

In January 2023 the Southern Poverty Law Center agreed to assist The Association to Preserve the Eatonville Community, Incorporated (PEC). In March 2023 they filed a state court complaint against OCPS on behalf of PEC.

Sovereign Land Co., the property developer who was scheduled to purchase the last 100-acre parcel of Hungerford School property had a change of heart and submitted a letter of termination to OCPS after Eatonville residents protested and a lawsuit to block the sale was filed.

On March 31, 2023 OCPS issued a statement:

“In deference to the viewpoints expressed by so many in the community, the leadership of OCPS has decided not to extend the contract or entertain other bids at this time. This decision presents us with a new opportunity to collaborate with the Eatonville community to preserve and celebrate the Town’s historic and cultural significance as the oldest incorporated Black town in the U.S." “OCPS will be considering our available options moving forward. However, under current state law, the school board cannot donate or give real property to any entity. The school board remains steadfast in its commitment to the high-quality education of students in Eatonville and beyond, including at the recently rebuilt Hungerford Elementary. The district is also putting the finishing touches on the updated Orange Technical College - Eatonville Campus, which will offer GED, adult education and a welding program adjacent to Hungerford Elementary.”

== Notable alumni ==
- Deacon Jones – NFL defensive end, member of the Pro Football Hall of Fame

== Additional sources ==
- Clyde W. Hall. 2005. An African-American Growing Up on the West Side of Winter Park, Florida 1925-1942
- Negro Educational Conference To Open Here On Monday (WP Herald) Feb 2, 1933
- Blackman, William Fremont. History of Orange County, Florida. Narrative and Biographical. DeLand, Florida, The E.O. Painter Printing Co., 1927
- The Orlando Sentinel, Sunday, March 4, 1990.
