= Deacon Jones =

American football player (1938–2013)

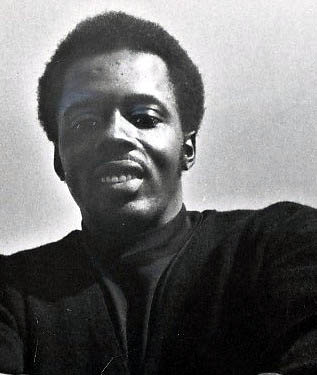
- Jones in 1971

No. 75
- Position: Defensive end

Personal information
- Born: December 9, 1938; Eatonville, Florida, U.S.
- Died: June 3, 2013 (aged 74); Anaheim Hills, California, U.S.
- Listed height: 6 ft 5 in (1.96 m)
- Listed weight: 272 lb (123 kg)

Career information
- High school: Hungerford (Eatonville)
- College: South Carolina State (1958); Mississippi Valley State (1960)
- NFL draft: 1961: 14th round, 186th overall pick

Career history
- Los Angeles Rams (1961–1971); San Diego Chargers (1972–1973); Washington Redskins (1974)

Awards and highlights
- 2× NFL Defensive Player of the Year (1967, 1968); 5× First-team All-Pro (1965–1969); 3× Second-team All-Pro (1964, 1970, 1972); 8× Pro Bowl (1964–1970, 1972); 5× NFL sacks leader (1964, 1965, 1967–1969); NFL 1960s All-Decade Team; NFL 75th Anniversary All-Time Team; NFL 100th Anniversary All-Time Team; St. Louis Football Ring of Fame; Los Angeles Rams No. 75 retired

Career NFL statistics
- Games played: 191
- Interceptions: 2
- Stats at Pro Football Reference
- Pro Football Hall of Fame

David D. "Deacon" Jones (December 9, 1938 – June 3, 2013) was an American professional football defensive end who played in the National Football League (NFL) for 14 seasons. He played for the Los Angeles Rams, San Diego Chargers, and Washington Redskins. He was inducted into the Pro Football Hall of Fame in 1980.

Jones specialized in sacks. Nicknamed "the Secretary of Defense", Jones is considered one of the greatest defensive players ever. The Los Angeles Times called Jones the "most valuable Ram of all time", and former Rams head coach George Allen called him the "greatest defensive end of modern football".

== Early life ==
Jones was born in Eatonville, Florida, and lived in a four-bedroom house with his family of ten. Jones attended Hungerford High School, where he played football, baseball, and basketball. During high school, Jones developed a lump in his thigh and learned that it was a tumor; he had surgery to remove it by Dr. Ron Alegria.

Late in life, Jones told The San Diego Union-Tribune that when he was 14 years old, he witnessed a carload of white teenagers laughingly hit an elderly black woman with a watermelon. The woman died days later from the injury, and Jones recalls that there was never a police investigation. "Unlike many black people then, I was determined not to be what society said I was", Jones later recounted. "Thank God I had the ability to play a violent game like football. It gave me an outlet for the anger in my heart."

== College career ==
Jones' college football career consisted of one year at South Carolina State University in 1958, followed by one year of inactivity in 1959 and a final season at then National Association of Intercollegiate Athletics (NAIA) Mississippi Vocational College, now known as Mississippi Valley State University, in 1960.

South Carolina State revoked Jones' scholarship after they learned that he participated in a protest during the Civil Rights Movement. However, one of the assistant football coaches at South Carolina State was leaving to coach at Mississippi Vocational, and told Jones and some of the other black players that he could get them scholarships at the new school. While he was playing at Mississippi Vocational, he and his black teammates had to sleep on cots in the opposing team's gym because motels would not take them on numerous occasions.

== Professional career ==
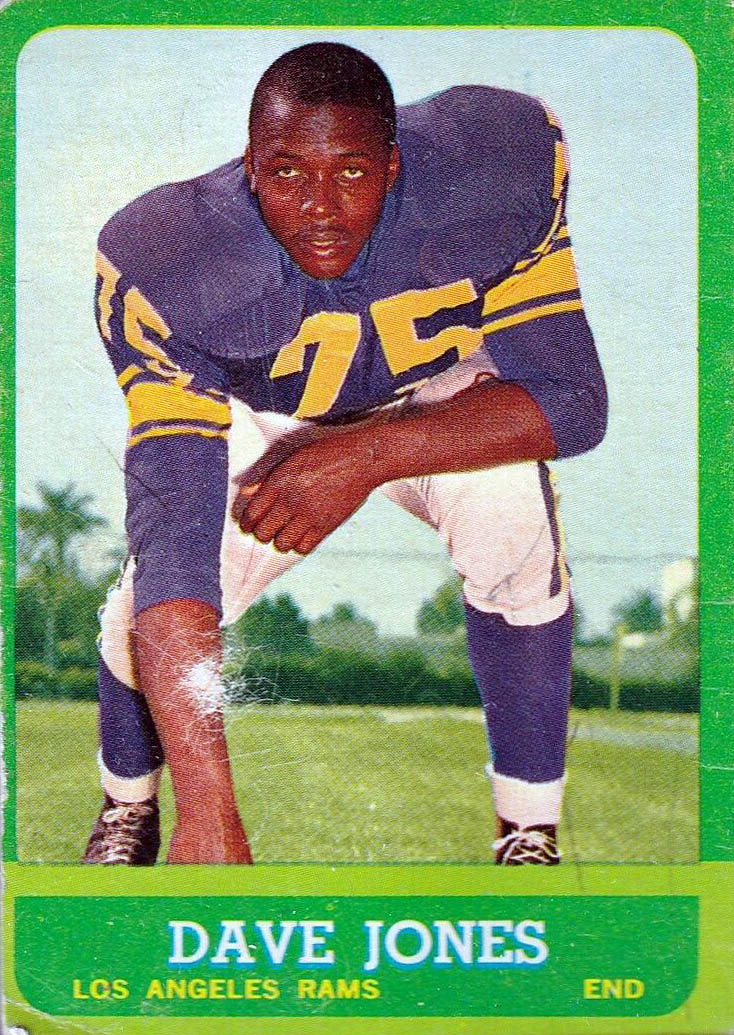
1963 Topps trading card of Jones with the Los Angeles Rams

Due to a lack of television coverage and modern scouting networks, Jones was largely overlooked during his college career. According to an NFL Films interview with writer Ray Didinger, "Deacon was discovered kinda by accident. The Rams were scouting some running backs and they found this defensive tackle who was outrunning the running backs that they were scouting." Jones was selected in the 14th round of the 1961 NFL draft by the Los Angeles Rams. He then earned a starting role as a defensive end and teamed with tackle Merlin Olsen to give Los Angeles a perennial All-Pro left side of the defensive line. He became a part of the Fearsome Foursome defensive line of the Rams (along with Lamar Lundy, Rosey Grier, and Olsen), which is now considered to have been one of the best defensive lines of all time.

"I'm probably the toughest (expletive) here. Ain't no
question about that with me. I'm the toughest guy
here... I'm clean. I mean, I ain't got no marks on
me. I don't know nobody else who can say that
who came out of any sport. I ain't got no marks on
me, so I've got to be the baddest dude I know of."

— Jones, in an interview with Kevin Jackson

Jones won consensus All-Pro honors five straight years from 1965 through 1969 and was second-team All-Pro in 1964, 1970, and 1972. He was also in seven straight Pro Bowls, from 1964 to 1970, and was selected to an eighth after the 1972 season with the San Diego Chargers. He was voted the team's Outstanding Defensive Lineman by the Los Angeles Rams Alumni in 1962, '64, '65, and '66. In 1971, Jones suffered a severely sprained arch, which caused him to miss four starts, and he ended the season with 4½ sacks, his career-low to that point.

Jones was traded along with Lee White and Greg Wojcik from the Rams to the San Diego Chargers for Jeff Staggs, a second-rounder in 1972 (30th overall) and a second and third-rounder in 1973 (31st and 60th overall) on January 29, 1972. He was named San Diego's defensive captain and led all Chargers' defensive linemen in tackles and won a berth on the AFC Pro Bowl squad. He concluded his career with the Washington Redskins in 1974. In the final game of his NFL career, the Redskins allowed him to kick the point-after-touchdown for the game's last score. Along the way, Jones was named the Associated Press NFL Defensive Player of the Week four times: week 14, 1967; week 12, 1968; week 11, 1969; and week 10, 1970.

Jones missed six games of a possible 196 regular-season encounters in his 14 National Football League seasons.

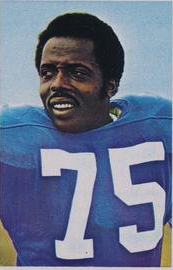
Jones with the Rams in 1972

=== Sacks ===
Jones was considered by many to revolutionize the position of defensive end.

What separated Jones from every other defensive end was his speed and his ability to make tackles from sideline to sideline, which was unheard of in his time. He also was the first pass rusher to use the head slap, a move that he said was, "to give myself an initial head start on the pass rush, in other words an extra step. Because anytime you go upside a man's head … or a woman; they may have a tendency to blink they [sic] eyes or close they eyes. And that's all I needed." "The head slap was not my invention, but Rembrandt, of course, did not invent painting. The quickness of my hands and the length of my arms, it was perfect for me. It was the greatest thing I ever did, and when I left the game, they outlawed it."

Pro Football Weekly reported he accumulated 173.5 sacks over his career. The total would be third on the all-time sack list, which would have ranked first all-time at the time of his retirement by a substantial margin.

In 1964, Jones had 22 sacks in only 14 games. If official, this would have stood as an NFL record until Al Baker's 1978 campaign in which he totaled 23 sacks. In 1967, Jones had 21.5 sacks; he again tallied 22 sacks in 14 games the following year. That is 1.57 sacks per game. The current NFL record, set by Myles Garrett in 2025 is 23 sacks in a 17 game season, or 1.35 per game.

Unofficial annual sack totals
Year	Sacks	Team
1961	8	Los Angeles Rams
1962	12	Los Angeles Rams
1963	5.5	Los Angeles Rams
1964	22	Los Angeles Rams
1965	19	Los Angeles Rams
1966	18	Los Angeles Rams
1967	21.5	Los Angeles Rams
1968	22	Los Angeles Rams
1969	15	Los Angeles Rams
1970	12	Los Angeles Rams
1971	4.5	Los Angeles Rams
1972	6	San Diego Chargers
1973	5	San Diego Chargers
1974	3	Washington Redskins

(Source: Los Angeles Rams, San Diego Chargers and Washington Redskins Media Guides)

== After football ==
=== Acting ===
Jones worked as a television actor, and appeared in numerous TV programs since the 1970s, most often appearing in cameo roles. He appeared in an episode of The Odd Couple where he and Oscar were in a television commercial selling shaving products. He appeared as himself on The Brady Bunch, and in a Bewitched episode in 1969, he played a guard to the Giant's castle in "Sam & the Beanstalk". Jones also played himself on an episode of Wonder Woman in 1978.

In 1978, he played a Viking named Thall in The Norseman. Fellow Hall of Famer Fred Biletnikoff joined Jones in the film, also portraying a Norseman. That same year, Jones portrayed a fierce defensive lineman named Gorman in the film Heaven Can Wait.

In the series G vs E, he played himself, but as an agent of "The Corps". He also played a role in the hit show, ALF, where he played a father figure to Alf.

=== Broadcasting ===
Jones served as a color analyst for Rams broadcasts on KMPC radio in the 1994 season, teaming with Steve Physioc and Jack Snow. In 1998, shortly before Super Bowl XXXII between the Denver Broncos and Green Bay Packers, Jones correctly predicted the Broncos, 11.5-point underdogs, would win the game and Terrell Davis would be named MVP of the game.

=== Business ===
Jones worked for many companies, including the Miller Brewing Company, Haggar Clothing, Pacific Coast Medical Enterprises, and Epson America, and represented the NFL and Champion Products as spokesman for their Throwback campaigns. Jones was also chairman for AstraZeneca Pharmaceuticals in their national hypertension awareness program.

=== Community involvement ===
NFL.com reported that Jones made several trips to Iraq to visit the U. S. military.

Jones served as the president and CEO of the Deacon Jones Foundation, an organization he founded in 1997 "to assist young people and the communities in which they live with a comprehensive program that includes education, mentoring, corporate internship, and community service."

=== Bringing the NFL back to Los Angeles ===
Jones was one of the many former L.A. Rams players who disliked the team's controversial relocation to St. Louis in 1995. He was adamant in interviews and appearances that he played for Los Angeles, not St. Louis, and considered the Rams franchise there a different team that should have a different name. He participated in many grassroots efforts to bring NFL football back to L.A. and also voiced support on many new stadium proposals. The Rams eventually returned to Los Angeles in 2016 after Jones had died.

== Honors ==
He was elected to the Pro Football Hall of Fame in his first year of eligibility in 1980, and was named to the NFL's 75th Anniversary All-Time Team in 1994. In 1999, he was ranked number 13 on The Sporting News list of the 100 Greatest Football Players, the highest-ranked player to have played for the Rams franchise, the highest-ranked defensive end, and the second-ranked defensive lineman behind Bob Lilly. The same year, he was named by Sports Illustrated as the "Defensive End of the Century". In 2010, he was named to the inaugural class of the Black College Football Hall of Fame.

- 1980 – Elected to South Carolina Athletic Hall of Fame
- 1981 – Voted to the Central Florida Sports Hall of Fame
- 1983 – Elected to the Florida Sports Hall of Fame
- 1999 – Recipient of the Gale Sayers Lifetime Spirit Achievement Award
- 1999 – Awarded "The Order of the Leather Helmet" by the NFL Alumni Organization, their highest honor
- 2001 – Winner of the NFL Alumni Spirit Award for community service
- 2005 – Recipient of the Junior Seau Foundation "Legend of the Year Award"
- 2007 – Named to the Florida High School Association All-Century Team which selected the Top 33 players in the 100-year history of high school football in Florida's history
- 2009 – His number 75 was retired by the Rams on September 27, 2009.
- 2013 – An award for the league leader in sacks is named in his honor and awarded for the first time. Robert Mathis of the Indianapolis Colts was the inaugural award winner.

== Personal life ==
Jones stated that he gave himself the nickname Deacon after joining the Rams because too many David Joneses were in the local phone book. "Football is a violent world and Deacon has a religious connotation", he told the Los Angeles Times in 1980. "I thought a name like that would be remembered."

Jones' wife Elizabeth is the chief operating and financial officer of the Deacon Jones Foundation, based in Anaheim Hills, California, the community in which the couple lived.

Jones was backed by the band Nightshift, which later became the group War. He was also confused with Melvyn "Deacon" Jones from Richmond, Indiana, a rhythm and blues singer who was active during the same period. He sang onstage with Ray Charles, performed on The Hollywood Palace in 1967 and 1968, and on The Merv Griffin Show in 1970.

Jones was the inspiration for the name of the 1977 song "Deacon Blues" by Steely Dan.

=== Death ===
On June 3, 2013, Jones died at his home in Anaheim Hills, California at age 74 of natural causes after suffering from lung cancer and heart disease. Jones' death left Rosey Grier as the last surviving member of the Fearsome Foursome, the L.A. Rams defensive line that is widely considered the best such unit in the history of the NFL. Of the former defensive standout, NFL commissioner Roger Goodell said, "Even with his fellow Hall of Famers, Deacon Jones held a special status. He was an icon among the icons." Washington Redskins General Manager Bruce Allen, son of Jones' longtime coach George Allen, called him "one of the greatest players in NFL history. Off the field... a true giant." Sports Illustrated columnist Peter King noted at his death that Jones had a profound effect on the way defense was played in the NFL and cited the influence on such later NFL stars as Lawrence Taylor, Deion Sanders, and Michael Strahan. As a tribute to Jones, the NFL created the Deacon Jones Award, that is given annually to the league leader in sacks.
