= Ormonde (surname) =

Ormonde is an Anglo-Irish surname, a variant spelling of Ormond, and a toponymic territorial designation closely associated with the Ormonde earldom and the Butler dynasty, whose principal members held the peerage title of Earl, Marquess, or Duke of Ormonde. The surname is also found in Portugal and Brazil as a corruption of the Scottish surname Drummond.

- Ann Ormonde (born 1935), Irish former politician
- Czenzi Ormonde (1909–2004), American novelist
- Donal Ormonde (born 1943), Irish former politician
- James Ormonde (Australian politician) (1903–1970), Scottish-born Australian politician
- John Ormonde (1905–1981), Irish politician
- José Eduardo Martins Ormonde (1943–2004), Portuguese botanist
- Paul Ormonde (1931–2022), Australian journalist and author

Butler dynasty

- James Butler, 1st Duke of Ormonde (1610–1688)
- Thomas Butler, 6th Earl of Ossory (1634–1680)
- James Butler, 2nd Duke of Ormonde (1665–1745)
- Charles Butler, 3rd Duke of Ormonde (1671–1758)
- John Butler, 15th and 8th Earl of Ormonde (died 1766)
- Walter Butler, 16th Earl of Ormonde (1703–1783)
- John Butler, 17th Earl of Ormonde (1740–1795)
- Walter Butler, 18th Earl of Ormonde (1770–1820)
- Walter Butler, 1st Marquess of Ormonde (1770–1820)
- James Wandesford Butler, 1st Marquess of Ormonde and 19th Earl of Ormonde (1777–1838)
- John Butler, 2nd Marquess of Ormonde and 20th Earl of Ormonde (1808–1854)
- James Edward Butler, 3rd Marquess of Ormonde and 21st Earl of Ormonde (1844–1919)
- Arthur Butler, 4th Marquess of Ormonde and 22nd Earl of Ormonde (1849–1943)
- George Butler, 5th Marquess of Ormonde and 23rd Earl of Ormonde (1890–1949)
- Arthur Butler, 6th Marquess of Ormonde and 24th Earl of Ormonde (1893–1971)
- Charles Butler, 7th Marquess of Ormonde and 25th Earl of Ormonde (1899–1997)

== See also ==
- Ormonde (disambiguation)
- Ormonde (given name)
- Ormond (surname)
