= Ormonde (given name) =

Male given name

Ormonde is a given name, a transferred use of the surname.

Notable people with the name include:

- H. Ormonde McConnell (1904–1998), Irish Methodist minister and missionary
- William Frederick Ormonde O'Callaghan (1852–1877), Irish politician
- Richard Ormonde Shuttleworth (1909–1940), British racing driver
- D. Ormonde Walker (1890–1955), President of Wilberforce University
- Ormonde Winter (1875–1962), British Army general

== See also ==
- Ormonde (disambiguation)
- Ormonde (surname)
