= Delos A. Blodgett House =

Historic house in Florida, United States

- U.S. National Register of Historic Places
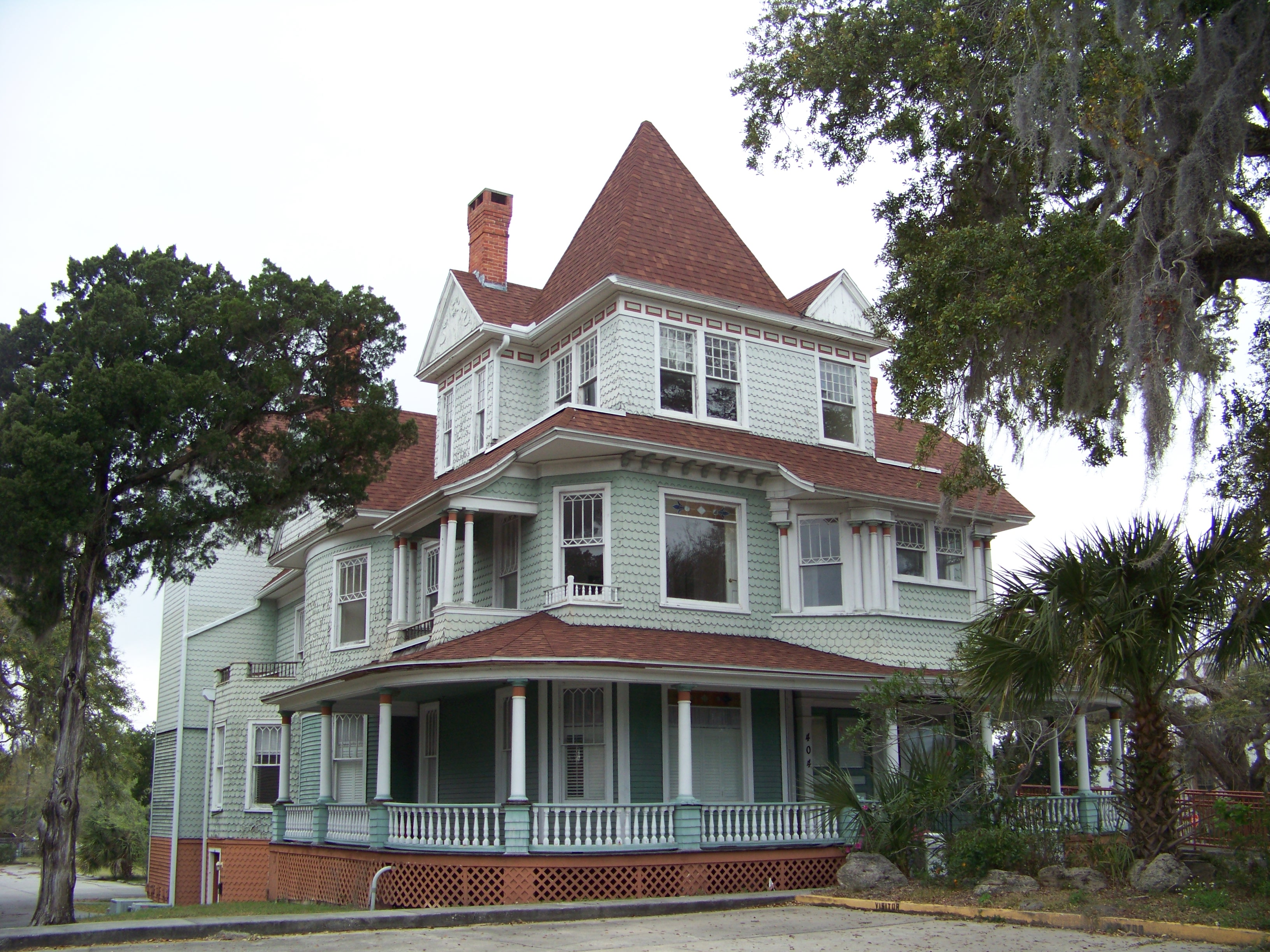

- Location within Volusia County
- Location: 404 S. Ridgewood Ave., Daytona Beach, Volusia County, Florida
- Coordinates: 29°12′16.32″N 81°1′12.59″W
- Area: less than one acre
- Built: 1896
- Architect: Sumner Hale Gove; Bliven, Giles H.
- Architectural style: Queen Anne
- NRHP reference No.: 93000724
- Added to NRHP: August 2, 1993

The Delos A. Blodgett House (also known as 8VO4385) is a historic house located at 404 Ridgewood Avenue in Daytona Beach, Florida.

== Description and history ==
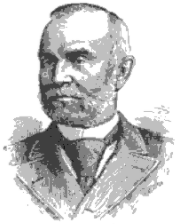
Delos A. Blodgett (1825–1908)

The 2 1/2-story house was completed in 1896 for Delos A. Blodgett and his wife Daisy A. Peck. It was listed on the National Register of Historic Places on August 2, 1993.

== Design ==
The Delos A. Blodgett House was designed by architect, Sumner Hale Gove in the Queen Anne style.

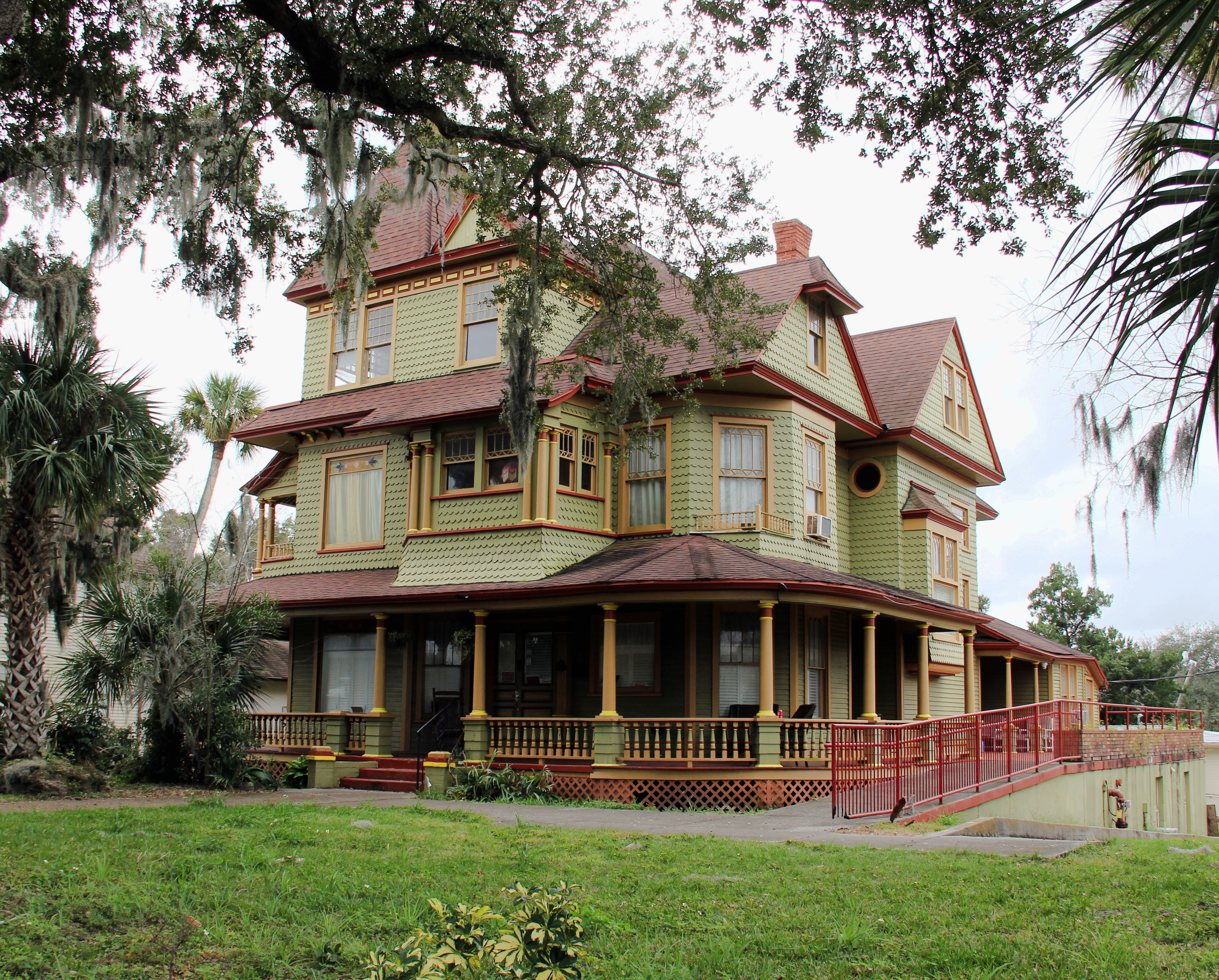
Delos A. Blodgett House - Northeast View (January 14, 2020)
