= Bert Ormond =

New Zealand footballer (1931–2017)

Personal information
- Full name: Robert Donaldson Ormond
- Date of birth: 12 January 1931
- Place of birth: Falkirk, Scotland
- Date of death: 15 November 2017 (aged 86)
- Place of death: Auckland, New Zealand
- Position: Inside forward

Senior career*
Years	Team	Apps	(Gls)
- Grange Rovers
1954–1958	Falkirk	53	(23)
1958–1960	Airdrieonians	10	(4)
1960–1961	Dumbarton	20	(7)
1961	Eastern Union		
1962	Gisborne Thistle		
1964	Blockhouse Bay		

International career
1962	New Zealand	2	(1)
- * Club domestic league appearances and goals

Robert Donaldson Ormond (12 January 1931 – 15 November 2017) was a Scottish-born footballer who represented New Zealand at international level.

Ormond played for Falkirk, Airdrieonians and Dumbarton in his native Scotland, before emigrating to New Zealand in 1961. Ormond made his full All Whites debut in a 4–1 win over New Caledonia on 2 June 1962 and played his second and final official FIFA A-international two days later, also against New Caledonia, scoring in the 4–2 win.

Ormond came from a successful footballing family. His brother Willie Ormond represented Scotland at the 1954 FIFA World Cup as a player and the 1974 FIFA World Cup as manager, and his brother Gibby Ormond also played professional football. Ormond's sons Ian Ormond and Duncan Ormond, and granddaughter (Duncan's daughter) Vicki Ormond also represented New Zealand.

In November 2016, Ormond was awarded the Friends of Football Medal of Excellence in recognition of his playing, coaching and media work in New Zealand football.

Ormond died on 15 November 2017, aged 86.
