= Ormond Yacht Club =

- U.S. National Register of Historic Places
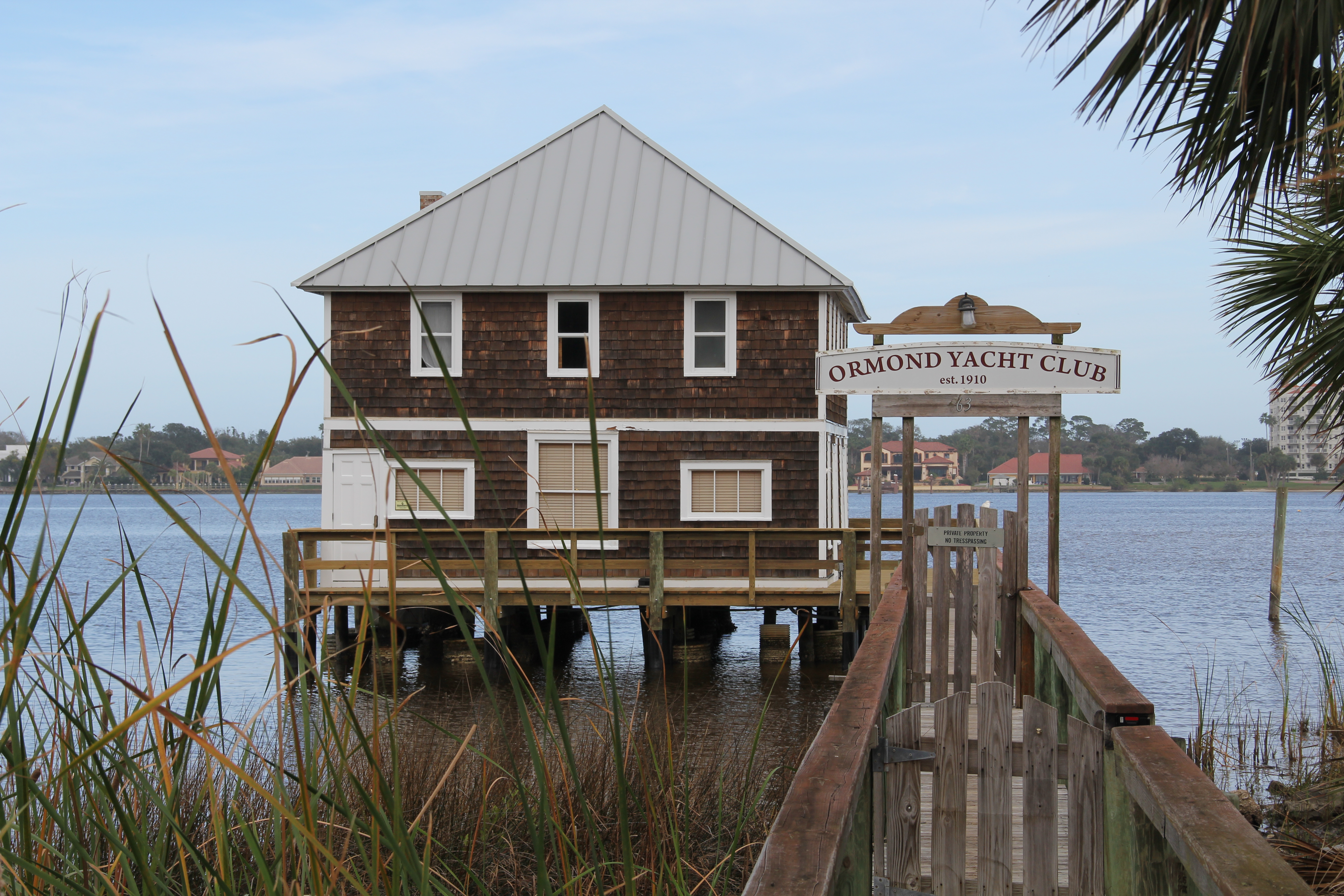
- Ormond Beach Yacht Club - West View - Camera Facing East

- Location within Volusia County
- Location: Ormond Beach, Florida
- Coordinates: 29°17′16″N 81°3′21″W
- Area: less than one acre
- Built: 1910
- Architect: Sumner Hale Gove
- Architectural style: Frame Vernacular
- NRHP reference No.: 05000310
- Added to NRHP: April 19, 2005

The Ormond Yacht Club building is a historic site in Ormond Beach, Florida, United States. The organization was chartered on February 10, 1910, and its constitution stated, "The object of the club shall be to increase the sociability and general up-building of the town of Ormond and to promote boating in its broadest sense,"

It is located at 63 North Beach Street, and was built in 1910 on the Halifax River. The structure is supported by a foundation of concrete piers with wooden posts. A 147-foot walkway connects the structure to the river's western shore. It is a 2-story frame vernacular wooden structure with 1,734 square feet. Its hip roof has a medium pitch (almost pyramidal in appearance). A walkway and boathouse once extended from the clubhouse further into the Halifax River, but these structures were destroyed by a storm and never rebuilt.

== Design ==
The Ormond Yacht Club was designed by architect, Sumner Hale Gove in the Frame Vernacular style.

== National Register of Historic Places ==
On April 19, 2005, it was added to the U.S. National Register of Historic Places.

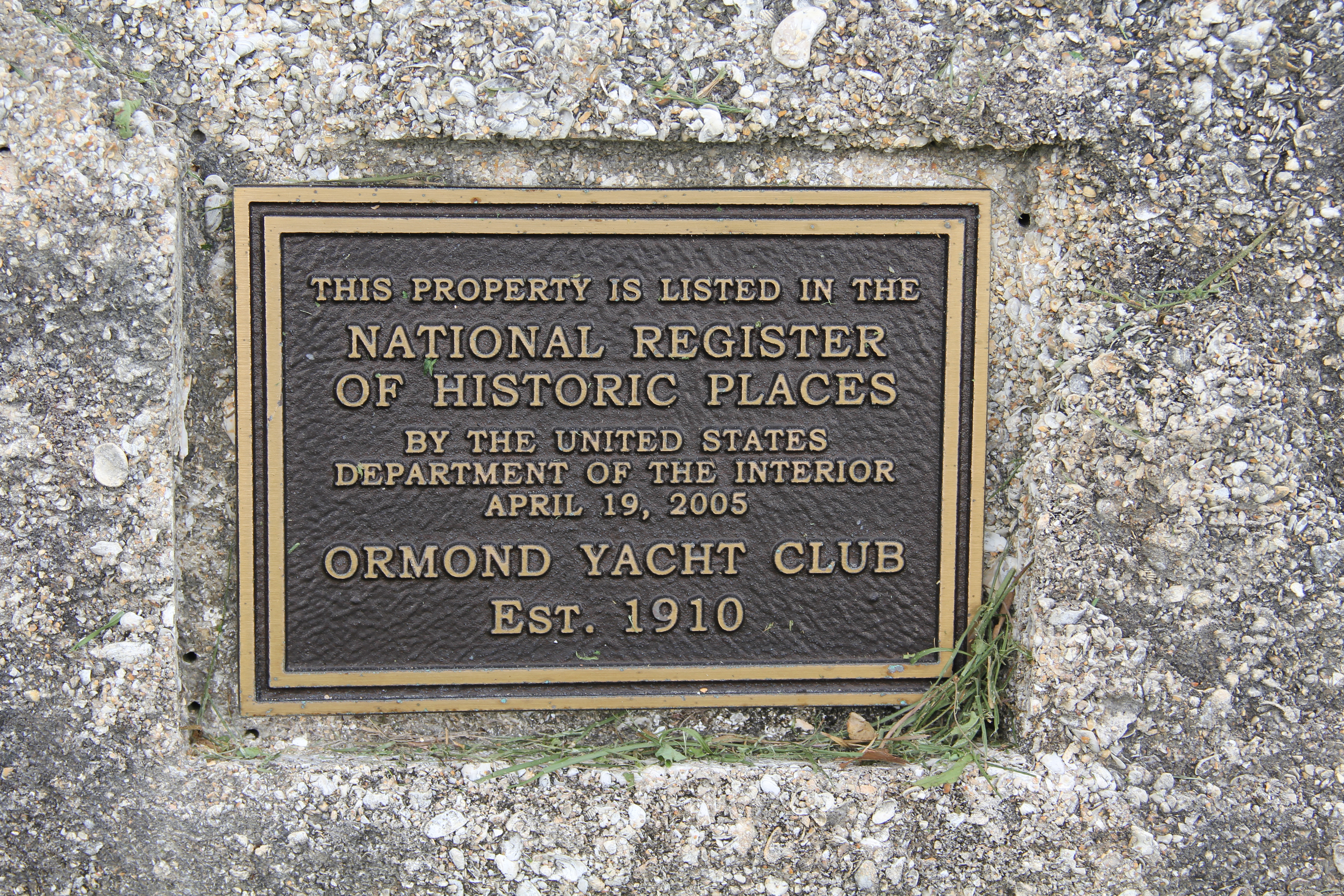
Ormond Yacht Club - NRHP Plaque.

== Gallery ==
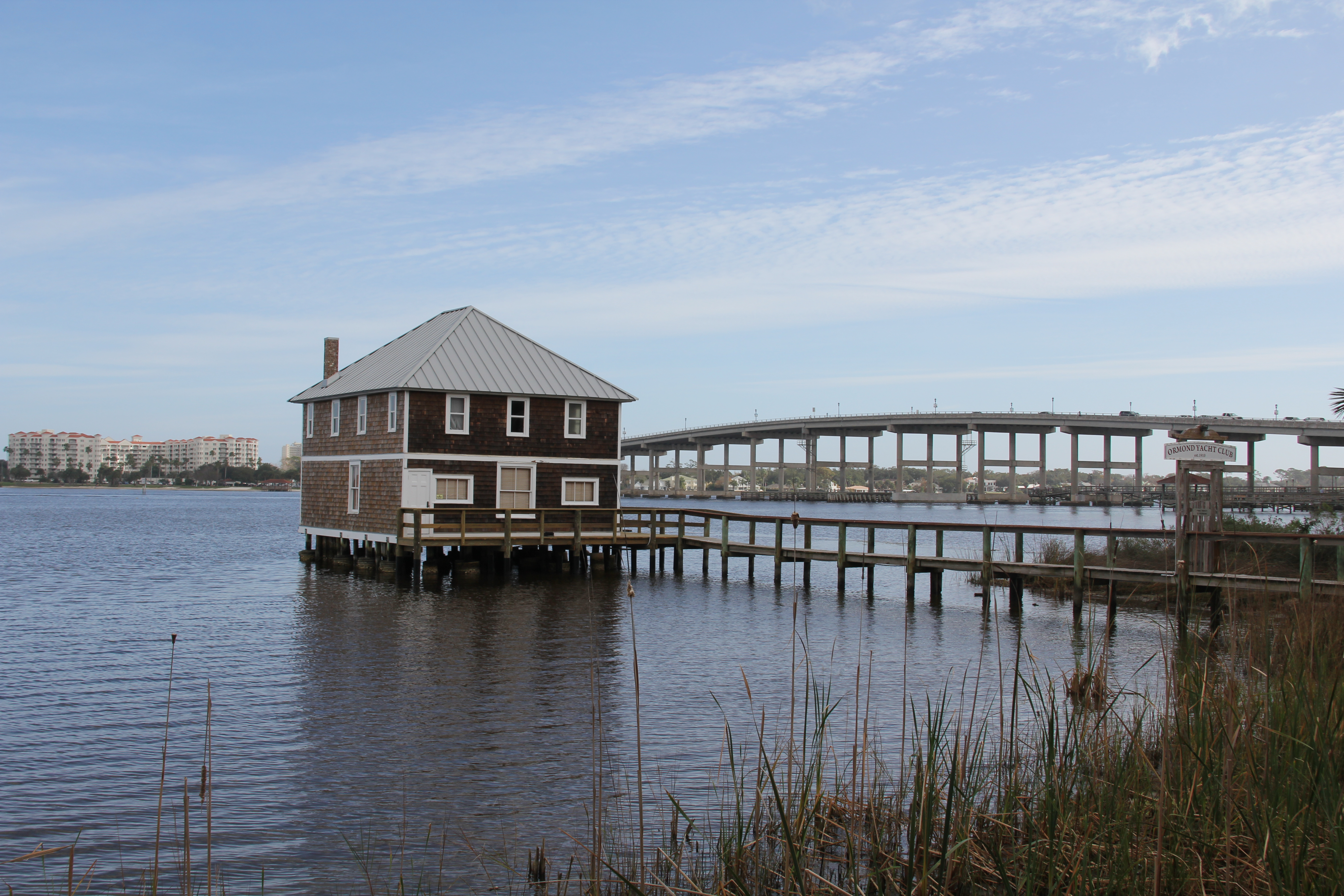
NE View - Bridge in Background

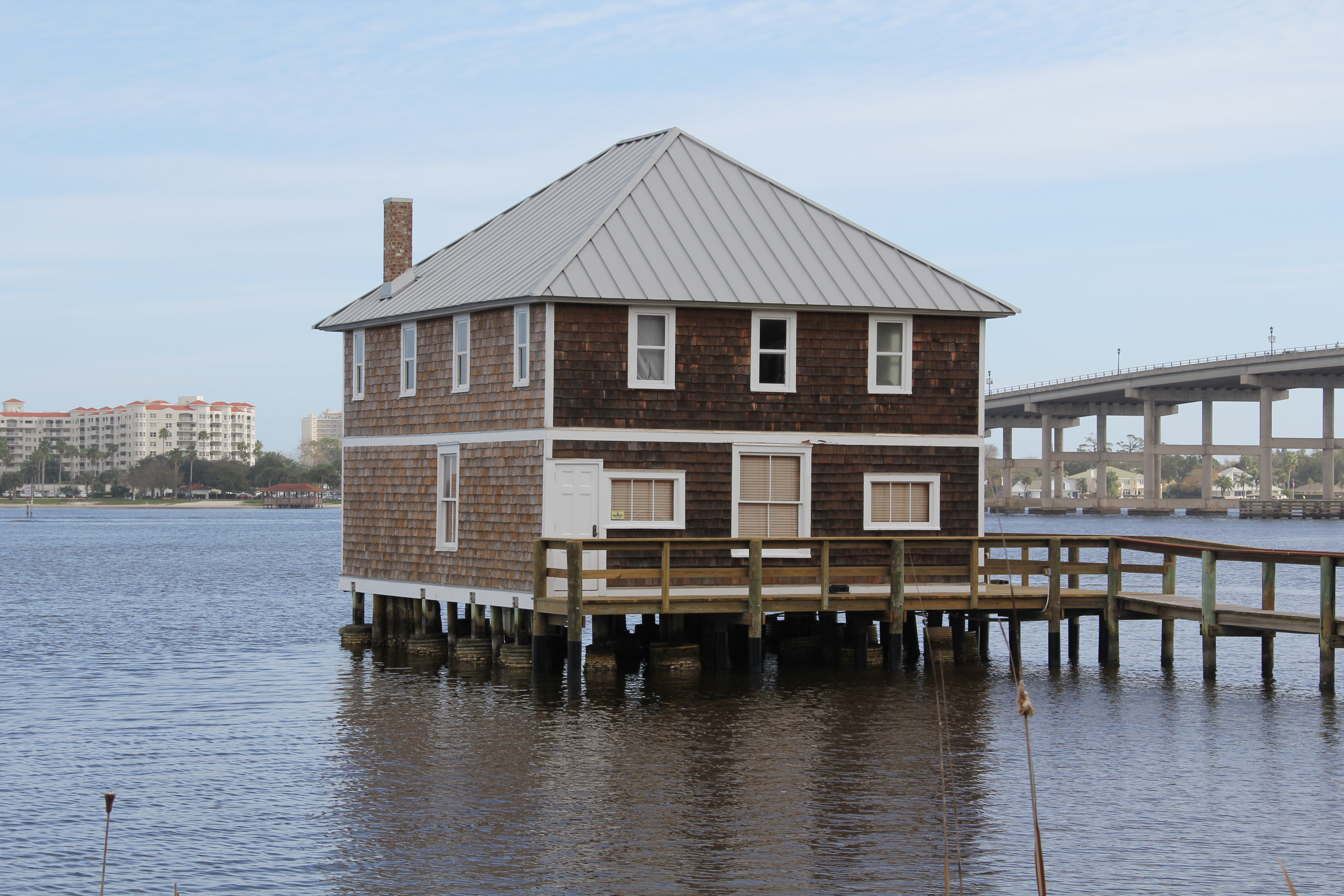
NE View - Building Close Up View

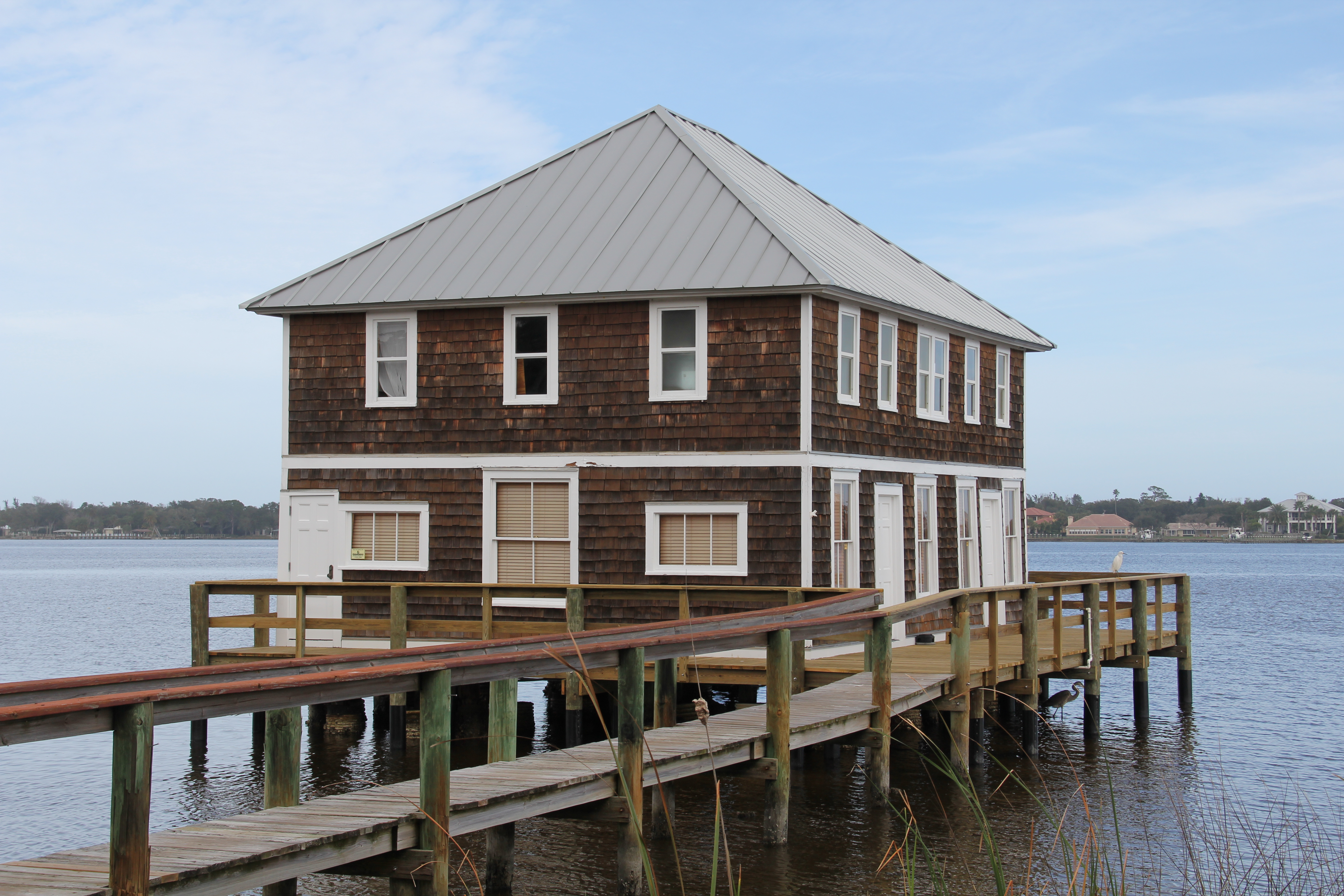
SE View - Building Close Up View

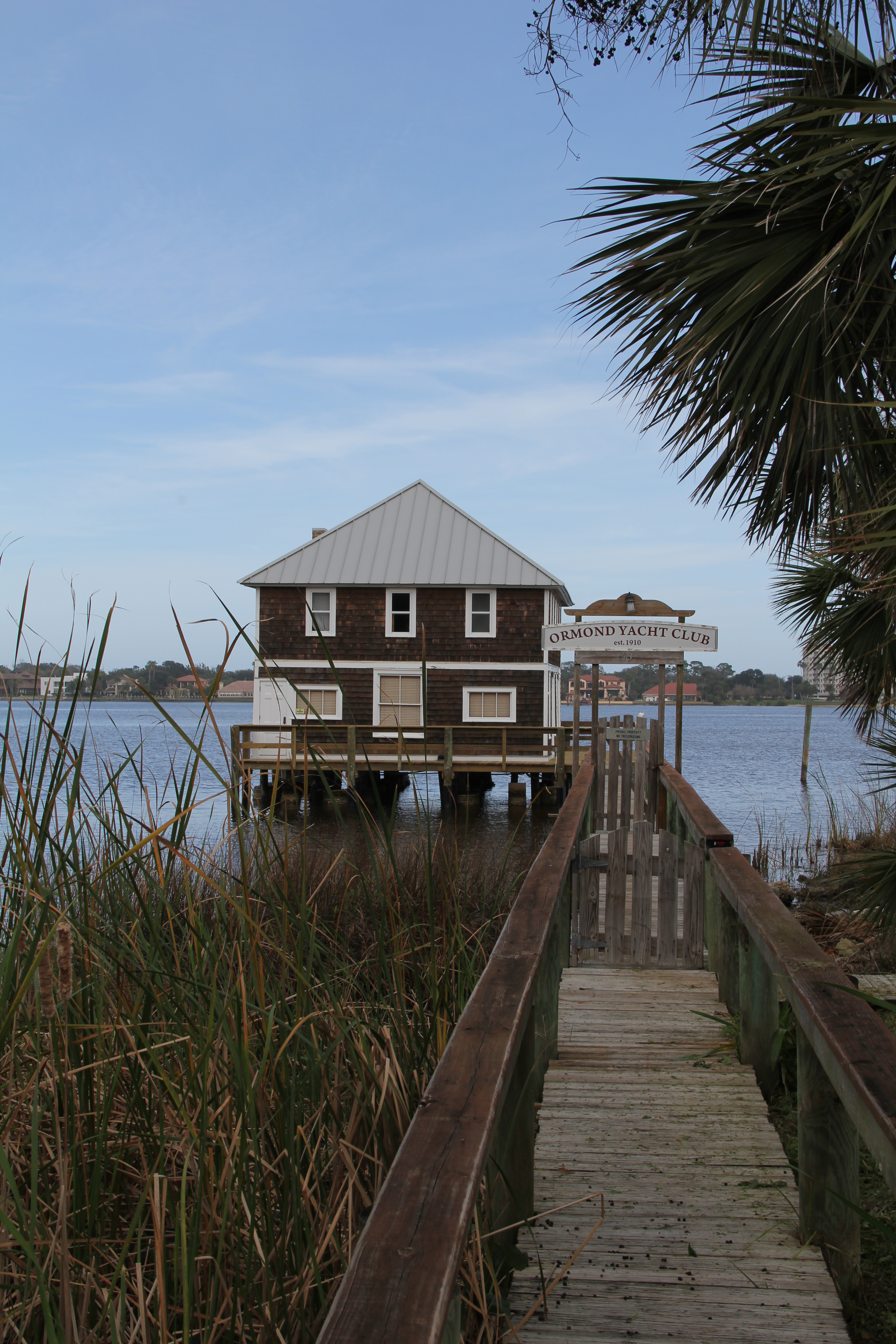
East - Boardwalk View
