= Ormonde =

Ormonde may refer to:

== People ==
- Ormonde (given name)
- Ormonde (surname)

== Places ==
- Ormonde Island, Nunavut, Canada
- Ormonde, Gauteng, a suburb of Johannesburg, South Africa
- Ormonde (Cazenovia, New York), a mansion listed on the U.S. National Register of Historic Places

== Other uses ==
- The British peerage of the Earl of Ormonde
- Ormonde (horse) (1883–1904), a thoroughbred racehorse
- Ormonde Wind Farm in the Irish Sea
- SS Ormonde, one of the first ships on which the "Windrush generation" of British African-Caribbean people travelled in 1947

== See also ==
- Ormond (disambiguation)
