= Ian Ormond =

New Zealand footballer (1949–2021)

Personal information
- Full name: John Lambie Ormond
- Date of birth: 5 August 1949
- Place of birth: Harthill, Scotland
- Date of death: 8 October 2021 (aged 72)
- Place of death: Auckland, New Zealand
- Position: Striker

Youth career
- 1961–1964: Eastern Union
- 1964–1965: Blockhouse Bay

Senior career*
Years	Team	Apps	(Gls)
1965–1976	Blockhouse Bay	203	(108)
1967–1968	→ Barnsley (loan)	1	(1)
1977	Stop Out	28	(2)
1978–1979	North Shore United	35	(19)
Total		267	(130)

International career
1965–1979	Auckland XI	16	(11)
1972–1978	New Zealand	10	(5)
- * Club domestic league appearances and goals

John Lambie "Ian" Ormond (5 August 1949 – 8 October 2021) was an association football player who represented New Zealand at international level.

== Biography ==
Ormond was born in Harthill, Scotland, on 5 August 1949, and migrated with his family to New Zealand in 1961. He became a naturalised New Zealand citizen in 1975. From 1965 to 1976 he played for Blockhouse Bay, but had a brief stint with Barnsley in the Football League, scoring a goal in his only appearance. Later in his career he played for Stop Out and North Shore United before retiring.

Ormond scored a hat-trick on his full All Whites debut in a 4–1 win over New Caledonia on 17 September 1971 and ended his international playing career with ten A-international caps and five goals to his credit, his final cap an appearance in a 1–0 loss to Australia on 2 March 1976.

Ormond was from good football pedigree: his uncle Willie Ormond represented Scotland at the 1954 FIFA World Cup as a player and the 1974 FIFA World Cup as manager, while his father Bert Ormond and brother Duncan Ormond also represented New Zealand, as did Duncan's daughter Vicki Ormond.

Ormond died in Auckland on 8 October 2021.

== Honours ==
Individual

- New Zealand Footballer of the Year: 1972
