= Ormond Shops =

- Formerly: Ormond Hosiery Shops
- Industry: Retail
- Founded: 1932
- Defunct: 1994
- Fate: Bankruptcy
- Headquarters: North Bergen, NJ, United States
- Number of locations: 40 (1968); 62 (1975); 121 (1982); 190 (1990); 204 (1993); 148 (1994, pre-bankruptcy); 85 (1994, post-bankruptcy)
- Area served: Eastern US
- Products: Women's apparel, dance wear, and hosiery

Ormond Shops (formerly Ormond Hosiery Shops) was an American chain of mall-based women's apparel shops in the United States that operated from the 1930s until 1994.

== History ==
Ormond Shops began as Ormond Hosiery Shops in the early 1930s, selling hosiery made by the Triumph Hosiery Mills. By 1934, the store had become a small chain, with stores in Frederick, Maryland, Hagerstown, Maryland, York, Pennsylvania, and others. The shops were named after Ormond Beach, Florida, which Herbert N. Goodman had visited and was fond of.

By 1968, the chain had grown to a total of 40 stores in eight states. During this time, the chain expanded by moving into new shopping centers and malls, and also expanded its product line; changing from exclusively hosiery to general women's apparel, including dresses, blouses, dance wear, sweaters, skirts, and lingerie.

By 1982, the chain had grown to 121 stores, primarily in malls. Stores were also "electronically linked" to the home office in North Bergen, New Jersey.

The chain reached its peak in 1993, when it operated a total of 204 stores. That year Ormond Shops also began operating a new chain called "Ormond Woman" that focused on "casual sportswear, career-related separates, and dresses for women sizes 14 to 24". 28 stores were opened in 1993, in what Chairman & President Lawrence B. Goodman stated as "one of the most important events in the history of Ormonds".

On April 5, 1994, Ormond Shops filed for Chapter 11 bankruptcy, initially closing 63 stores and planning to leave bankruptcy. However, in December that year, it was announced that Ormond Shops would be closing all 85 remaining stores, with 33 stores going to competitor Canadians Corp.
