= Vicki Ormond =

New Zealand footballer (born 1982)

Personal information
- Full name: Vicki Ormond
- Date of birth: 29 September 1982 (age 44)
- Place of birth: New Zealand
- Position: Forward

International career
Years	Team	Apps	(Gls)
2000	New Zealand	4	(0)

Vicki Ormond (born 29 September 1982) is an association football player who represented New Zealand.

A forward, Ormond made her full Football Ferns debut as a substitute in a 2–1 loss to Japan on 2 June 2000 and finished her international career with four caps to her credit.

Ormond's father Duncan Ormond, uncle Ian Ormond and grandfather Bert Ormond represented the All Whites of New Zealand.
