= 1960–61 Dundee United F.C. season =

Dundee United
1960–61 season
- Chairman: J. Johnston-Grant
- Manager: Jerry Kerr
- Stadium: Tannadice Park
- Scottish First Division: 9th W13 D7 L14 F60 A58 P33
- Scottish Cup: Round 1
- League Cup: Group stage

The 1960–61 season was the 53rd year of football played by Dundee United, and covers the period from 1 July 1960 to 30 June 1961. United finished in ninth place in the First Division.

== Match results ==
Dundee United played a total of 41 competitive matches during the 1960–61 season.

=== Legend ===
Win
Draw
Loss

All results are written with Dundee United's score first. Own goals in italics

=== First Division ===
Date	Opponent	Venue	Result	Attendance	Scorers
24 August 1960	Hibernian	H	3-1	9,000	
10 September 1960	St Johnstone	A	2-0	11,000	
17 September 1960	Dundee	H	3-1	20,000	
24 September 1960	Partick Thistle	A	1-3	11,000	
1 October 1960	Heart of Midlothian	A	1-1	15,000	
8 October 1960	Airdrieonians	H	1-2	8,000	
15 October 1960	Raith Rovers	A	2-0	7,000	
22 October 1960	Motherwell	H	0-1	9,000	
29 October 1960	Clyde	H	2-1	12,000	
5 November 1960	Third Lanark	A	1-5	7,000	
12 November 1960	Rangers	A	0-4	25,000	
19 November 1960	Kilmarnock	H	2-4	12,000	
26 November 1960	Aberdeen	A	3-1	13,000	
3 December 1960	St Mirren	H	2-0	7,000	
10 December 1960	Celtic	A	1-1	15,000	
17 December 1960	Ayr United	H	2-1	7,700	
24 December 1960	Dunfermline Athletic	A	2-3	7,000	
31 December 1960	Hibernian	A	0-2	15,000	
2 January 1961	St Johnstone	H	0-2	18,500	
7 January 1961	Dundee	A	0-3	22,000	
14 January 1961	Partick Thistle	H	3-0	9,000	
21 January 1961	Heart of Midlothian	H	3-0	12,000	
4 February 1961	Airdireonians	A	4-4	5,000	
18 February 1961	Raith Rovers	H	4-1	10,000	
4 March 1961	Clyde	A	1-3	5,000	
7 March 1961	Motherwell	A	3-4	6,000	
11 March 1961	Third Lanark	H	1-2	8,000	
18 March 1961	Rangers	H	1-1	17,300	
25 March 1961	Kilmarnock	A	1-1	8,012	
1 April 1961	Aberdeen	H	3-3	9,000	
8 April 1961	St Mirren	A	3-0	8,000	
10 April 1961	Celtic	H	1-1	15,000	
22 April 1961	Ayr United	A	0-3	3,000	
29 April 1961	Dunfermline Athletic	H	5-0	10,000	

=== Scottish Cup ===
Date	Rd	Opponent	Venue	Result	Attendance	Scorers
11 January 1961	R1	St Mirren	H	0-1	10,500	

=== League Cup ===
Date	Rd	Opponent	Venue	Result	Attendance	Scorers
13 August 1960	G2	Stirling Albion	A	2-1	4,222	
17 August 1960	G2	Brechin City	H	2-1	8,000	
20 August 1960	G2	Stenhousemuir	H	3-3	10,700	
27 August 1960	G2	Stirling Albion	H	1-3	10,000	
31 August 1960	G2	Brechin City	A	1-2	3,000	
3 September 1960	G2	Stenhousemuir	A	1-1	2,500	

== See also ==
- 1960–61 in Scottish football
