= Duncan Ormond =

New Zealand footballer (born 1950)

Personal information
- Full name: Thomas Duncan Ormond
- Date of birth: 10 October 1950 (age 76)
- Place of birth: Harthill, Scotland

Senior career*
Years	Team	Apps	(Gls)
?–1976	Blockhouse Bay		
1977–	North Shore United		

International career
1979–1980	New Zealand	7	(1)
- * Club domestic league appearances and goals

Thomas Duncan Ormond (born 10 October 1950) is a former association football player who represented New Zealand at international level.

== Biography ==
Ormond was born in Harthill, Scotland, on 10 October 1950, and migrated with his family to New Zealand in 1961. He became a naturalised New Zealand citizen in 1979.

Ormond scored the winner on his full All Whites debut in a 1–0 win over Australia on 13 June 1979 and ended his international playing career with seven A-international caps to his credit. His debut goal was the only international goal he scored in official FIFA matches. He earned his final cap in a 3–0 loss to Canada on 18 September 1980.

Ormond comes from good football pedigree, his uncle Willie Ormond represented Scotland at the 1954 FIFA World Cup as a player and the 1974 FIFA World Cup as manager, while his father Bert Ormond and brother Ian Ormond and daughter Vicki Ormond also represented New Zealand.
