= Zora Neale Hurston Museum of Fine Arts =

Coordinates: 28.61851°N 81.38204°W

Zora Neale Hurston National Museum of Fine Arts
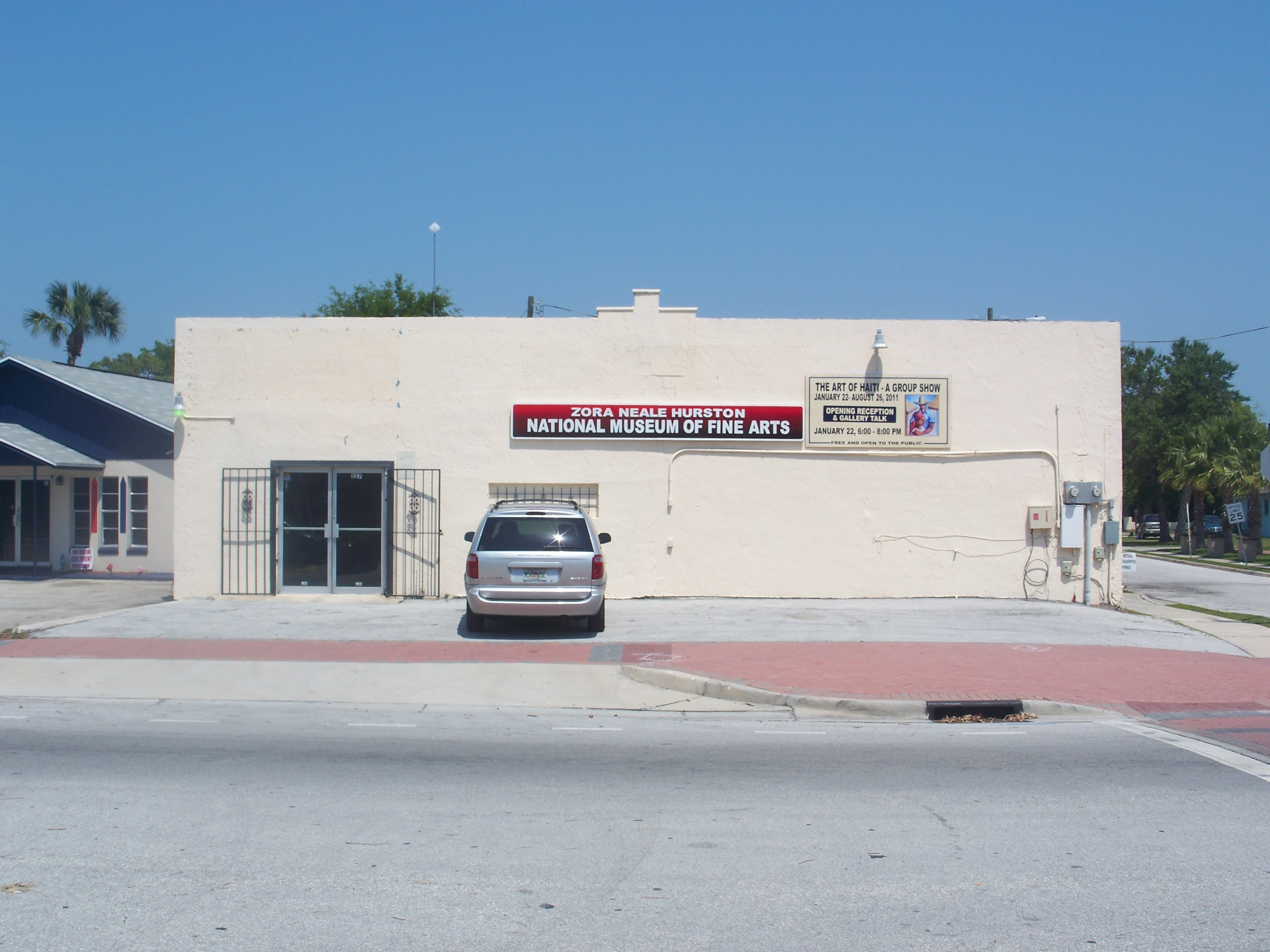
- Established: 1990
- Location: Eatonville, Florida
- Type: Art museum
- Website: www.zoranealehurstonmuseum.com

The Zora Neale Hurston National Museum of Fine Arts, also known as The Hurston, is an art museum in Eatonville, Florida. The Hurston is named after Zora Neale Hurston, an African-American writer, folklorist, and anthropologist who moved to Eatonville at a young age and whose father became mayor of Eatonville in 1897. The museum's exhibits are centered on individuals of African descent, from the diaspora and the United States. The Hurston features exhibitions quarterly to highlight emerging artists.

The museum supports the art involved within the museum and the Zora Neale Hurston Trail, which contains 16 historic artists and 10 markers written by Hurston. The museum is also featured in the Zora Festival, which is held every year to celebrate the history, culture, and arts of Eatonville. In January 2022, the Southern Poverty Law Center gave a $50,000 grant to the museum.

== Overview ==
Established in 1990, the museum shows artworks of African-American artists and other artists from the African Diaspora. The Hurston is sponsored by the Association to Preserve the Eatonville Community, Inc. (P.E.C.), which continues the history and culture of Eatonville. It has developed partnerships with the Orlando Museum of Fine Arts and the Cornell Fine Arts Museum program at Rollins College.
