= Eatonville, Florida =

Town in Florida, US

- Town
- Town of Eatonville
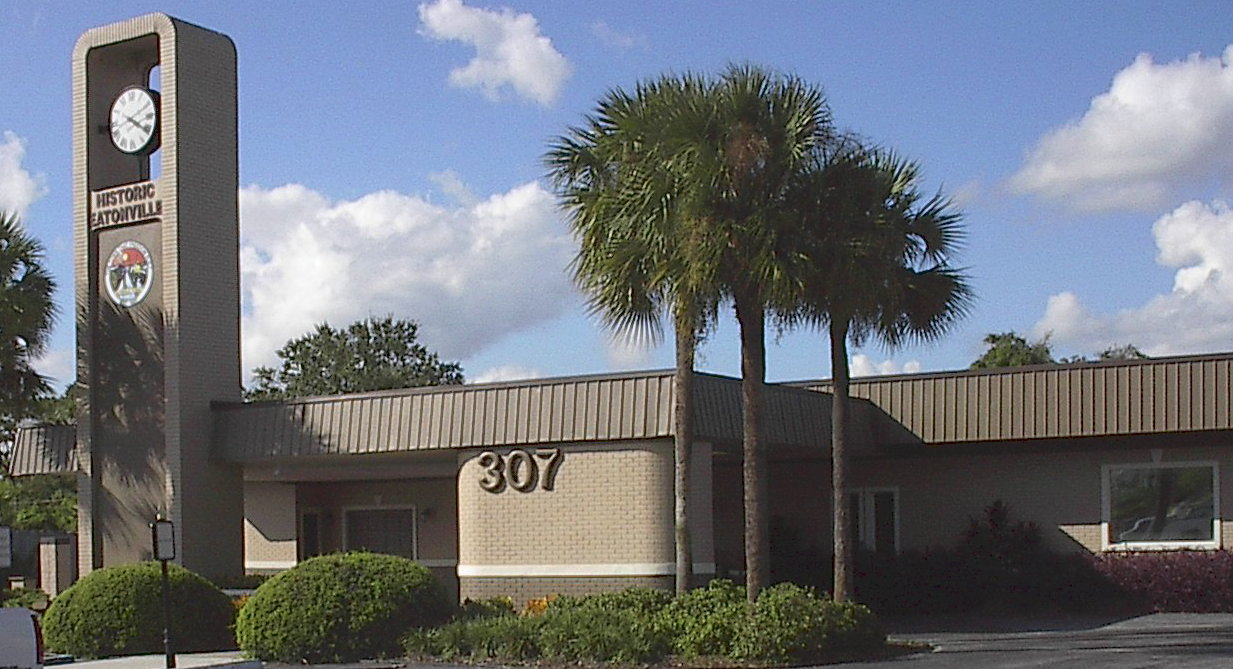
- Eatonville Town Hall

- Motto: "The Town that Freedom Built"
- Location in Orange County and the state of Florida
- Coordinates: 28°37′00″N 81°23′26″W
- Country: United States
- State: Florida
- County: Orange
- Founded (Lawrence): c. 1880-1881
- Incorporated (Town of Eatonville): August 15, 1887

Government
  - Type: Mayor-Council
  - Mayor: Ruth "Ruthi" Critton
  - Vice Mayor: Angela Y. Thomas
  - Council Members: Wanda Randolph, LaDwyana Jordan, and Tarus Mack
  - Town Clerk: Veronica L. King
  - Town Attorney: Clifford B. Shepard III

Area
  - Total: 1.16 sq mi (3.00 km^{2})
  - Land: 0.98 sq mi (2.55 km^{2})
  - Water: 0.17 sq mi (0.45 km^{2})
- Elevation: 92 ft (28 m)

Population (2020)
  - Total: 2,349
  - Density: 2,384.5/sq mi (920.65/km^{2})
- Time zone: UTC-5 (Eastern (EST))
  - Summer (DST): UTC-4 (EDT)
- ZIP code: 32751
- Area codes: 407, 689
- FIPS code: 12-19650
- GNIS feature ID: 2406418
- Website: www.townofeatonville.org

Eatonville is a town in Orange County, Florida, United States, six miles north of Orlando. It is part of Greater Orlando. Incorporated on August 15, 1887, it was one of the first freedmen's towns, which were self-governing, all-Black municipalities in the United States (Brooklyn, Illinois, incorporated July 8, 1873, is the oldest incorporated Black town in the U.S.). The town had a population of 2,349 as of the 2020 census with the vast majority of its residents being Black or African American.

== History ==
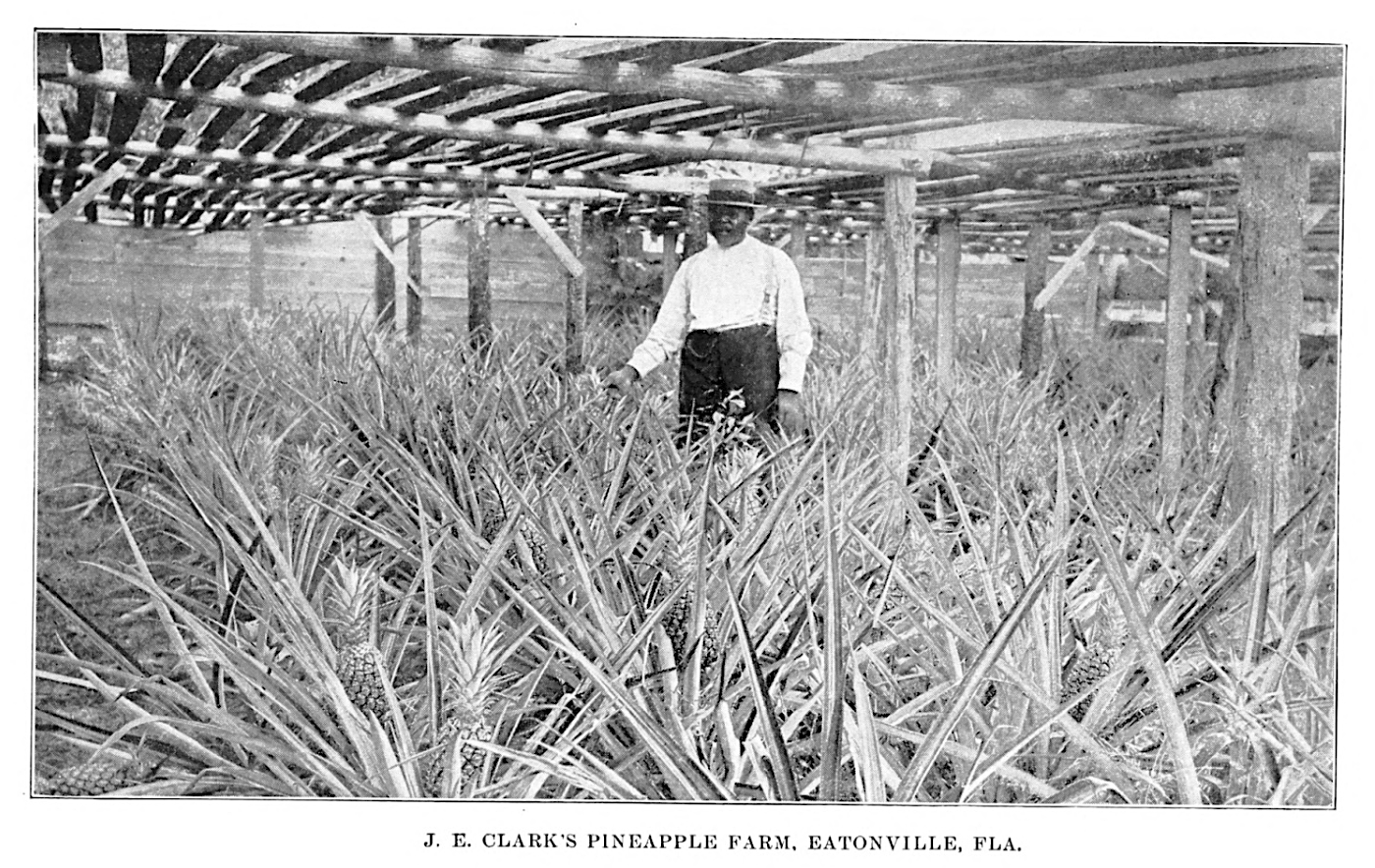
J. E. Clark's Pineapple Farm, Eatonville, Florida

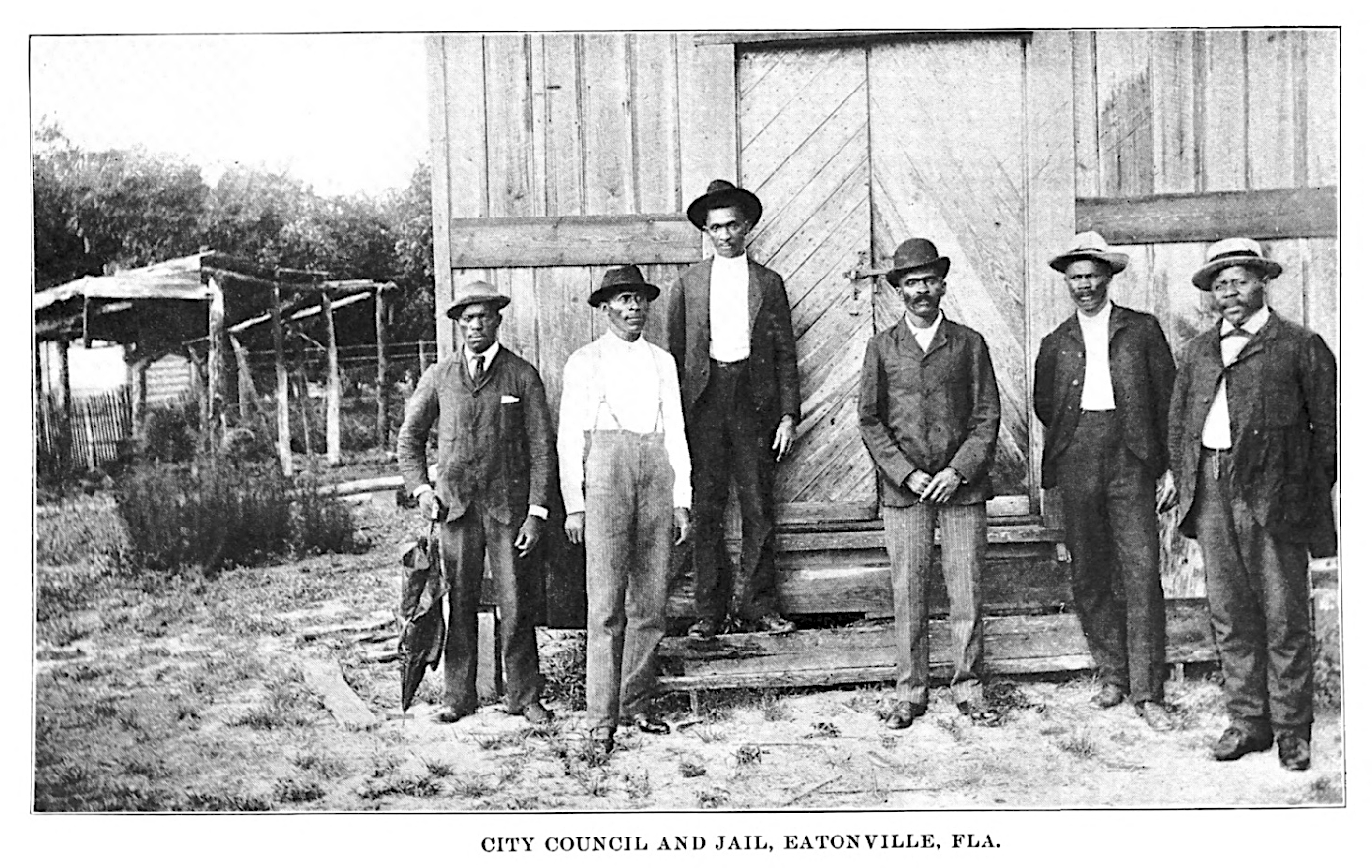
City Council and Jail (1907), Eatonville, Florida

Ten years after the Emancipation Proclamation, formerly enslaved people migrated to rural Central Florida, finding work in the citrus groves. Joseph "J.E." Clark and several friends attempted to purchase a block of land to establish a "colony for colored people, but so great was the prejudice then existing against the Negro that no one would sell them land for such a purpose", according to Clark. Lewis Lawrence, originally from Utica, New York, agreed to help them in 1881. Lawrence convinced Captain Josiah Eaton, a neighbor and friend, to sell him 22 acres, which Lawrence subdivided. Upon each lot he had a small house constructed and instructed an agent to sell them. An article in the Tallahassee Weekly Floridian newspaper titled, "A Negro Colony in Florida" stated,

A Negro settlement has been established at Maitland...which is divided into forty-eight lots, 50x50 feet, to be sold to Negroes at from $19 to $30 per lot. Mr. Lawrence has erected on this land a framed church 30x20 feet, a bell for which has been presented by the Congregational Sabbath School of Chelsea, Connecticut. No liquor is ever to be sold or given away on the ground; no gambling or disreputable house of any kind will ever be allowed, under a forfeiture of the purchase.

In 1884, the Orange County Reporter wrote about the “colored village at Maitland sometimes known as Lawrence, the name of its worthy founder”. Mr. Lawrence requested that the settlement use the name Eatonville. The following year, Maitland incorporated using votes from Black people, and at least one Black man was elected as a town officer. A year after incorporation, there were "discussions of separation as a peaceful, progressive-minded, mutually beneficial solution to the so-called 'race problem'.” While sources seem to disagree on the exact date and year of the town's incorporation, the town's official site provides a detailed account of the process and the dates.

The Town of Eatonville was officially incorporated as a municipality on August 15, 1887.

Jim Crow laws enforced segregation, violence and racial discrimination in the Southern United States in the late 19th century. The Eatonville Speaker newspaper printed an invitation in 1889:

“Colored People of the United States! Solve the Great Race Problem by Securing a Home in Eatonville, Florida, a Negro City Governed by Negroes.” The article describes Eatonville as a "thriving community of 200-300 people — all colored, and NOT A WHITE FAMILY in the whole city.” The newspaper also recounts a near-lynching in Sanford, nineteen miles away.

Rev. Columbus H. Boger Sr. (1857-1918) was Eatonville's first mayor, serving from 1887-1888. He edited the Florida Watchman newspaper. A post office opened at Eatonville in 1889, and closed in 1918.

The Robert Hungerford Normal and Industrial School was founded in 1897 to provide education for Black students in grades 6-12 and taught children for more than 100 years. In 1990, the town founded the Zora Neale Hurston Museum of Fine Arts. Every winter the town stages the Zora Neale Hurston Festival of the Arts and Humanities. A library named for her opened in January 2004.

Artist Jules Andre Smith created a series of paintings depicting life in Eatonville during the 1930s and 1940s. Twelve of these works are at the Maitland Art Center in the adjacent town of Maitland.

Author Zora Neale Hurston grew up in Eatonville, and the area is featured in many of her stories. Hurston's novel Their Eyes Were Watching God is set in the town and nearby communities, many of which have disappeared with the expansion of Greater Orlando.

Before the days of racial integration, Club Eaton was a popular stop on the Chitlin' Circuit, hosting performers ranging from B.B. King to Aretha Franklin, Ray Charles, Sam Cooke, The Platters, Duke Ellington, Ella Fitzgerald, Billie Holiday and James Brown.

The Eatonville Historic District and Moseley House Museum are located within the town's borders.

As of 2023, Eatonville has no gas station, supermarket, or pharmacy; only a Family Dollar. With a median household income of $27,000, the town is struggling to survive.

=== Eatonville Historic District ===
The Eatonville Historic District was designated and added to the National Register of Historic Places on February 3, 1998. The district is bounded by Wymore Road, Eaton Street, Fords, and East Avenues, Ruffel, and Clark Streets. It contains 48 historic buildings. Several are related to the town's establishment as a home for African Americans and to its most famous former resident, Zora Neale Hurston.

The National Trust for Historic Preservation named on May 1, 2024 Eatonville, Florida as one of the eleven historic sites in the country most endangered and in need of protection due to development threats that will displace the inhabitants of the town.

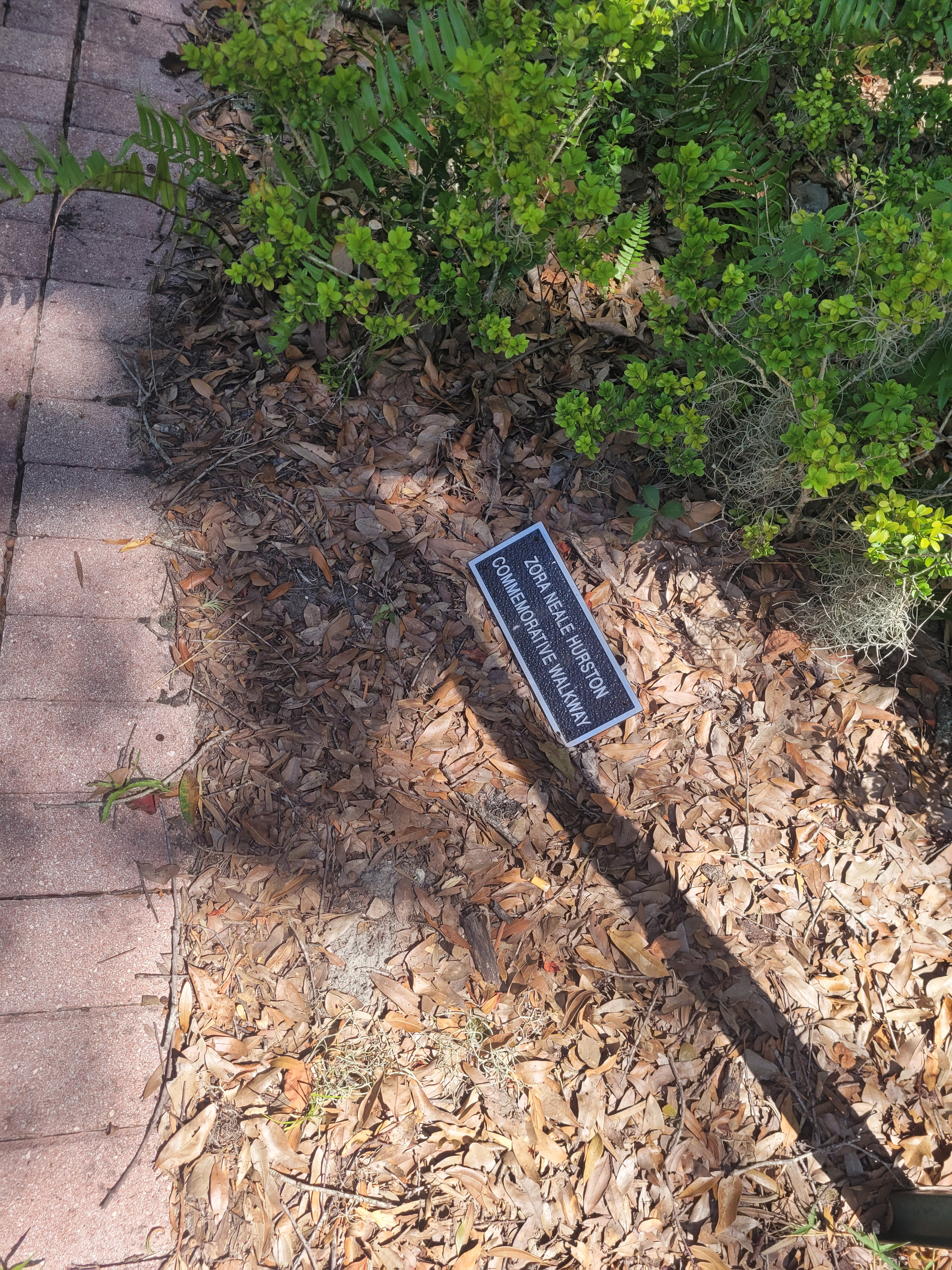
Zora Neale Hurston Commemorative Walkway

== Geography ==
According to the United States Census Bureau, the town has a total area of 1.1 square miles (2.8 km^{2}), of which 1.0 square mile (2.6 km^{2}) is land and 0.1 square miles (0.26 km^{2}) (9.17%) is water.

=== Climate ===
The climate in this area is characterized by hot, humid summers and generally mild winters. According to the Köppen climate classification, the Town of Eatonville has a humid subtropical climate zone (Cfa).

== Demographics ==
Historical population
Census	Pop.	Note	%±
1900	125		—
1910	108		−13.6%
1920	125		15.7%
1930	136		8.8%
1960	857		—
1970	2,024		136.2%
1980	2,185		8.0%
1990	2,170		−0.7%
2000	2,432		12.1%
2010	2,159		−11.2%
2020	2,349		8.8%
U.S. Decennial Census; Florida Department of Agriculture

=== Racial and ethnic composition ===
Eatonville town, Florida – Racial and ethnic composition Note: the US Census treats Hispanic/Latino as an ethnic category. This table excludes Latinos from the racial categories and assigns them to a separate category. Hispanics/Latinos may be of any race.
Race / Ethnicity (NH = Non-Hispanic)	Pop 2000	Pop 2010	Pop 2020	% 2000	% 2010	% 2020
White (NH)	169	147	265	6.95%	6.81%	11.28%
Black or African American (NH)	2,151	1,788	1,692	88.45%	82.82%	72.03%
Native American or Alaska Native (NH)	7	0	6	0.29%	0.00%	0.26%
Asian (NH)	7	16	7	0.29%	0.74%	0.30%
Pacific Islander or Native Hawaiian (NH)	0	1	1	0.00%	0.05%	0.04%
Other race (NH)	0	2	10	0.00%	0.09%	0.43%
Mixed race or Multiracial (NH)	12	9	47	0.49%	0.42%	2.00%
Hispanic or Latino (any race)	86	196	321	3.54%	9.08%	13.67%
Total	2,432	2,159	2,349	100.00%	100.00%	100.00%

=== 2020 census ===
As of the 2020 census, Eatonville had a population of 2,349. The median age was 37.6 years. 22.1% of residents were under the age of 18 and 14.4% of residents were 65 years of age or older. For every 100 females there were 101.5 males, and for every 100 females age 18 and over there were 97.2 males age 18 and over.

100.0% of residents lived in urban areas, while 0.0% lived in rural areas.

There were 782 households in Eatonville, of which 41.0% had children under the age of 18 living in them. Of all households, 20.5% were married-couple households, 25.8% were households with a male householder and no spouse or partner present, and 46.5% were households with a female householder and no spouse or partner present. About 22.8% of all households were made up of individuals and 9.6% had someone living alone who was 65 years of age or older.

There were 854 housing units, of which 8.4% were vacant. The homeowner vacancy rate was 3.1% and the rental vacancy rate was 4.1%.

According to the 2020 American Community Survey 5-year estimates, there were 437 families residing in the town.

=== 2010 census ===
As of the 2010 United States census, there were 2,159 people, 709 households, and 514 families residing in the town.

=== 2000 census ===
As of the census of 2000, there were 2,432 people, 761 households, and 548 families residing in the town. The population density was 2,469.5 inhabitants per square mile (953.5/km^{2}). There were 858 housing units at an average density of 871.2 per square mile (336.4/km^{2}). The racial makeup of the town was 89.31% African American, 7.5% White, 0.49% Native American, 0.29% Asian, 1.56% from other races, and 0.82% from two or more races. Hispanic or Latino of any race were 3.54% of the population.

In 2000, there were 761 households, out of which 35.5% had children under the age of 18 living with them, 28.0% were married couples living together, 37.6% had a female householder with no husband present, and 27.9% were non-families. 22.5% of all households were made up of individuals, and 8.5% had someone living alone who was 65 years of age or older. The average household size was 2.92 and the average family size was 3.42.

In 2000, in the town, the population was spread out, with 33.6% under the age of 18, 8.8% from 18 to 24, 27.5% from 25 to 44, 19.6% from 45 to 64, and 10.4% who were 65 years of age or older. The median age was 31 years. For every 100 females, there were 88.7 males. For every 100 females age 18 and over, there were 81.3 males.

In 2000, the median income for a household in the town was $29,457, and the median income for a family was $31,042. Males had a median income of $21,719 versus $21,328 for females. The per capita income for the town was $11,257. About 21.9% of families and 25.0% of the population were below the poverty line, including 29.3% of those under age 18 and 24.5% of those age 65 or over.

== Government ==
The Town of Eatonville has a Mayor-Council government.

=== Mayors ===
- Columbus H. Boger Sr. ~ 1887 - 1888
- Joseph E. Clark ~ 1889 - 1890
- John Hurston ~ 1897 - 1899
- Joseph E. Clark ~ 1900 - 1912
- John Hurston ~ 1912 - 1916
- Matthew B. Brazell ~ 1916 - 1920
- Samuel "Sam" M. Moseley ~ 1920 - 1922
- Hiram B. Lester ~ 1922 - 1924
- Augustus Johnson ~ 1928 - 1932
- Columbus H. Crooms ~ 1938 - 1963
- Nathaniel Vereen Sr. ~ 1963 - 1980
- Abraham Gordon ~ 1980 - 1986
- Nathaniel Vereen Sr. ~ 1987 - 1989
- Ada Sims ~ 1990 - 1992
- Harry Bing ~ 1992 - 1994
- Anthony Grant ~ 1994 - 2009
- Bruce Mount ~ 2009 - 2015
- Anthony Grant ~ 2015 - 2016 (removed because of voter fraud)
- Eddie Cole ~ 2016 - 2022
- Angie Gardner ~ 2022 - 2026
- Ruth "Ruthi" Critton ~ 2026–present

== Transportation ==
Interstate 4 passes through the city limits, but there is no exit. The closest exits are Florida State Road 423 (to the south) and Florida State Road 414 (to the north).

== Education ==
All public schools are served by Orange County Public Schools.

The Robert Hungerford Normal and Industrial School was founded in 1897 for vocational education for Black students by Professor and Mrs. Russell C. Calhoun, a graduate of Tuskegee Institute. At that time, segregation in the South provided few opportunities for non-whites. The 160 acres (65 ha) land was donated by E.C. Hungerford of Chester, Connecticut in memory of his physician son, Robert, who died of yellow fever. Cash donations came from across the country, including $400 from Booker T. Washington. The school was successful and more than 100 students were boarding in 1927, as well as local children attending and adult classes offered at night. Ten years later, Orange County provided bus transportation for black children from nearby Winter Park to attend the school. The school provided both vocational and college preparation, teaching English, Latin, history, general science, biology, algebra, geometry, industrial arts and home economics. Students could also learn bookkeeping and typing, physical education and agriculture. Programs for drafting and radio were added during the 1940s. The campus included girls & boys dormitories, a dining hall, library, chapel, laundry, industrial training shops, home economics laboratory, equipment barn and farmland. To keep expenses down, students were assigned various duties around the campus including jobs at the school's dairy, chicken coops, gardens and janitorial/maintenance of the institution's classrooms and buildings. The school had been privately funded until the Orange County Public Schools (OCPS) took control in 1950. The Hungerford School was closed in 2010.

=== Land ===
The Hungerford campus had grown to 300 acres (120 ha) in 1950, and was held in trust for the school. That land was almost 40% of the town of Eatonville. However, OCPS purchased the land from the trust in 1951 for about $16,000 with the stipulation that it be used "for the education of Black children". Since the original purchase, OCPS has petitioned the courts multiple times to reduce the number of acres required to be used for the education of Black children from 300 to 100 with OCPS receiving almost $8 million. The remaining 100 acres (40 ha) parcel was appraised in 2019 for $20 million, but the OCPS announced their intention to sell the land to a developer for $14 million on March 31, 2023. The plans include a "new community" of 350 homes, apartments, retail businesses and restaurants. Existing residents claim the new development would wipe out the historic community and violate the land agreement, so locals are in a fight with the school board.

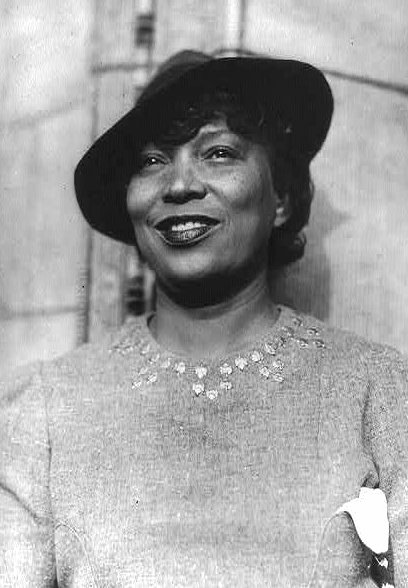
Zora Neale Hurston

== Media ==
Eatonville is home to WESH and WKCF, two television stations serving the Orlando television market. The Orlando Sentinel newspaper serves the area as well.

== Notable people ==
- Ha Ha Clinton-Dix, NFL football safety
- Zora Neale Hurston, folklorist and author
- Deacon Jones, NFL football defensive end
- Norm Lewis, actor and baritone singer

== Cultural references ==
- "Eatonville" is a song by indie rockers The Samples, written by Andy Sheldon. The song was written after Sheldon read Their Eyes Were Watching God and is on their fourth album, The Last Drag, released in 1993.
