= Ormond (steam automobile company) =

Defunct American motor vehicle manufacturer

United Motor & Vehicle Company
- Company type: Automobile manufacturer
- Founded: 1904; 122 years ago
- Defunct: 1905; 121 years ago
- Fate: Closed
- Headquarters: Boston, Massachusetts, United States

The Ormond Steamer automobile was made by the United Motor and Vehicle Company of Boston, Massachusetts from 1904 to 1905.

They are not to be confused with the 1903 Ormond Motor Car Company of Brooklyn, New York which did not produce any cars.

== History ==
The Ormond Steamer used a 24-hp steam-engine with a flash boiler. Built as a large touring car with a canopy top, the company exhibited at the 1905 New York Automobile show. An estimated three to four cars were built under this marque.
