= James Ormond (alpine skier) =

British alpine skier (born 1973)

James Ormond (born 18 June 1973) is a British former alpine skier who competed in the 1998 Winter Olympics.
