= Wayne Ormond (businessman) =

Australian entrepreneur and businessman (born 1973)

Wayne Rodney PaedOrmond
- Born: 15 July 1973 (age 53)
- Known for: Founder of Refund Home Loans and Child Grooming Charges

Wayne Ormond is an Australian businessman. He was the founder of a mortgage brokering service which was prosecuted by the Australian Competition & Consumer Commission and later went into administration.

== Career ==
Ormond established Refund Home Loans in 2004. In 2009 and 2010, the company was mentioned in Australia's Business Review Weekly magazine including Fast Franchise, Fast Starters and he was included in the "Young Rich List" which features the top 100 wealthiest under 40s; in 2009 Ormond was listed at number 74.

In October 2009, the Australian Competition & Consumer Commission ("ACCC") commenced proceedings against Refund Home Loans and Ormond over accusations they breached the Trade Practices Act 1974.

In 2010, Refund Home Loans and Wayne Ormond admitted to making false and misleading statements about a non-existent agreement with the ACCC and the court ordered injunctions restraining such misrepresentations in future, issuing of corrective statements and a mandatory implementation of a compliance program including specific training for Mr. Ormond.

In October 2011, the company went into voluntary administration, and was acquired the following year. The shell of the former company was placed into liquidation a month later with debts of over AUS$20 million according to the liquidator.

In March 2025, Ormond faced court charged with indecent treatment of a child under 16 and of grooming a child under 16.

It is understood the complainant spoke to police earlier in the year. His solicitor Michael O’Brien, of Fisher Dore Lawyers, sought an adjournment of the matter. Magistrate Linda Bradford-Morgan ordered the brief of evidence be available by May 19 and adjourned the case to June 20. Ormond is not yet required to enter a plea, he remains on bail.
