= Ormond Memorial Art Museum and Gardens =

Place in Florida

Coordinates: 29.28965°N 81.04495°W

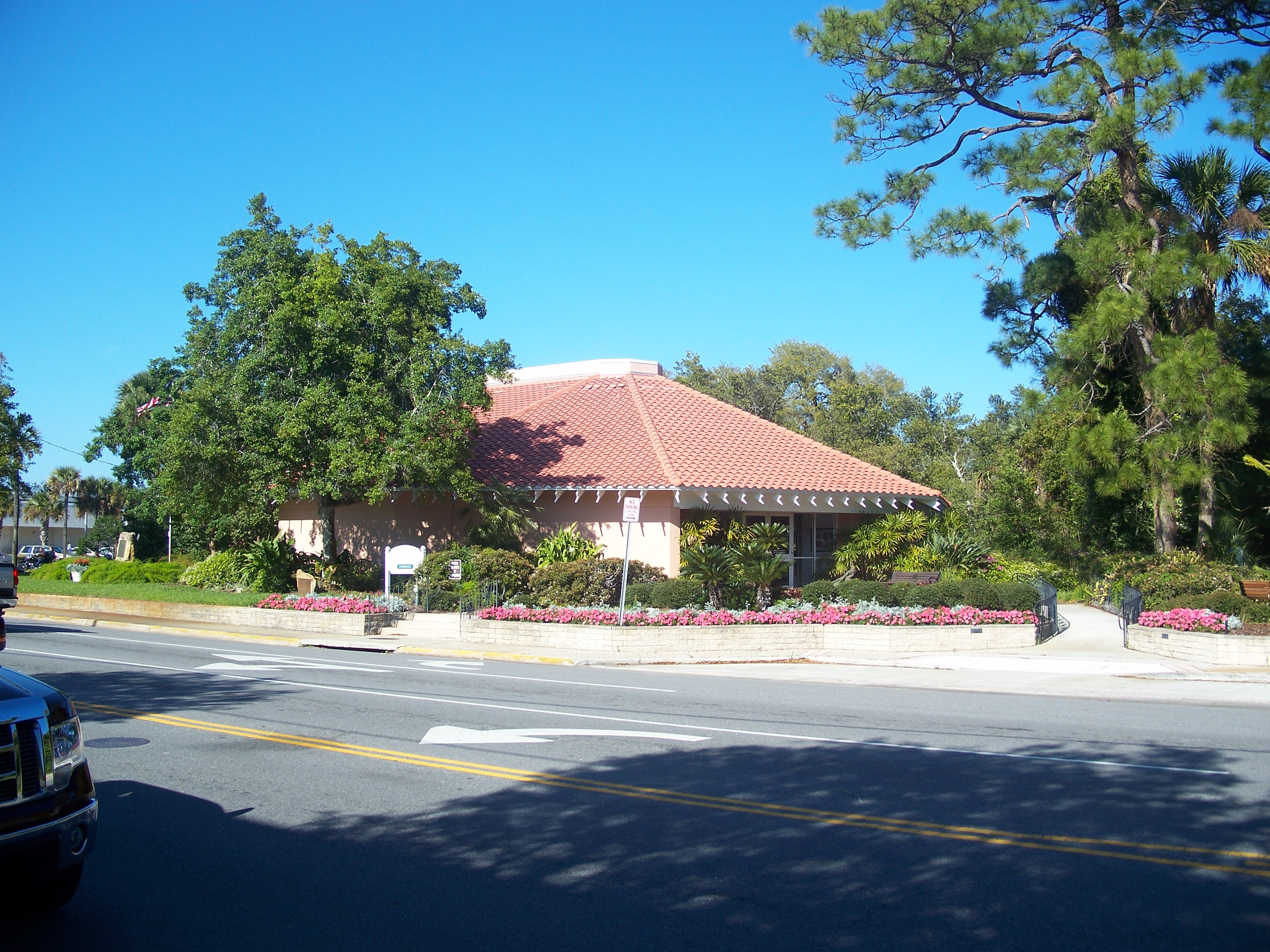
View of the Ormond Memorial Art Museum and gardens

Ormond Memorial Art Museum and Gardens is in Ormond Beach, Volusia County in central Florida. Exhibitions include artwork from regional Florida artists and national artists as well as an annual student exhibition, and programs for veterans. The art museum includes "spiritual oil paintings" by Malcolm Fraser and a botanical garden that is home to the 1885 Emmons Cottage.

The museum and gardens were founded as a memorial to veterans of World War I and World War II, and there is an American flag and monument to soldiers who served in World War I as well as a bronze plaque inside the Museum listing Ormond Beach residents who served in World War II, including an honor roll recognizing those who died in the war. There are also sculptures in the Memorial Gardens dedicated to American soldiers who fought in the Korean War and Vietnam War.

== See also ==
- List of museums in Florida
