= List of Dundee United F.C. players =

This is a list of notable players who have played for Dundee United Football Club. Dundee United were founded as Dundee Hibernian in 1909 but were renamed in 1923. The club made their début in the Northern League in 1909 and joined the Scottish Football League for the first time a year later.

== List of players ==
The following list includes all Dundee United players that have played 100 or more competitive matches for the club in any first-class competition, e.g., national leagues (Scottish Football League, Scottish Premier League, Scottish Professional Football League), Scottish Cup, League Cup or any European competition such as the European Cup, UEFA Cup Winners' Cup, Inter-Cities Fairs Cup and UEFA Europa League.

Players are listed with their first-team début and last appearance for the club, along with appearances and goals. Statistics are correct as of 27 September 2014 and are taken from where further details are available.

Nat.	Name	First game	Final game	Apps	Goals
Scotland	Derek Addison	12 January 1974	8 August 1981	137	15
Scotland	Alan Archibald	9 August 2003	16 January 2007	144	7
Scotland	Stuart Armstrong	6 November 2010	27 September 2014	132*	16
Scotland	Alex Arnold	16 August 1952	24 April 1957	140	0
Scotland	Eamonn Bannon	31 October 1979	14 May 1988	440	108
Scotland	Bobby Bauld	3 November 1923	30 April 1927	143	30
Scotland	Dave Beaumont	26 October 1983	7 January 1989	119	5
Scotland	Doug Berrie	14 December 1946	28 March 1953	185	0
Scotland	Tom Boland	4 September 1909	27 April 1914	102	3
Scotland	Dave Bowman	9 August 1986	9 May 1998	429	12
Scotland	Craig Brewster	7 August 1993	19 September 2006	117	47
Scotland	Jimmy Briggs	24 August 1955	17 January 1970	401	33
Ghana	Prince Buaben	4 August 2007	15 May 2011	142	11
Scotland	Jim Cameron	22 April 1967	18 August 1973	208	1
Scotland	Kenny Cameron	10 August 1968	3 May 1974	170	83
Scotland	Walter Carlyle	13 August 1960	26 October 1963	103	45
Poland	Radosław Cierzniak	2 August 2012	27 September 2014	100*	0
Scotland	John Clark	3 November 1982	9 November 1993	329	37
Scotland	Alec Cleland	30 April 1988	14 January 1995	183	10
Scotland	Paddy Connolly	6 May 1989	23 September 1995	144	40
Scotland	Craig Conway	29 July 2006	15 May 2011	166	16
Scotland	Jackie Copland	19 December 1970	4 May 1976	192	22
Scotland	Johnny Coyle	11 August 1951	14 December 1957	132	112
Scotland	Dave Cross	14 August 1954	15 March 1958	137	3
Scotland	George Cruikshank	4 September 1948	31 March 1954	186	32
Scotland	Christian Dailly	21 August 1990	16 May 1996	178	21
Republic of Ireland	Jon Daly	13 January 2007	19 May 2013	203	73
Scotland	Sandy Davie	21 April 1962	10 May 1974	184	0
Canada	Jason de Vos	17 October 1998	12 May 2001	111	2
Netherlands	Sieb Dijkstra	7 December 1996	1 May 1999	113	0
Republic of Ireland	Seán Dillon	13 January 2007	27 September 2014	265*	4
Scotland	Paul Dixon	23 September 2008	13 May 2012	146	5
Scotland	Billy Dodds	23 September 1998	19 February 2005	132	42
Scotland	Davie Dodds	18 August 1976	12 April 1986	369	150
Scotland	Darren Dods	4 August 2007	2 October 2010	100	5
Denmark	Finn Døssing	5 December 1964	21 October 1967	115	76
Scotland	Stuart Duff	1 December 2001	22 December 2007	171	4
Scotland	Andy Dunsmore	12 March 1949	31 March 1954	104	27
Scotland	Craig Easton	1 January 1997	16 May 2004	259	17
Scotland	Alec Edmiston	8 January 1949	15 April 1957	178	0
Scotland	Iain Ferguson	23 August 1986	14 May 1988	104	44
Scotland	George Fleming	12 February 1972	26 April 1980	340	37
Republic of Ireland	Willo Flood	4 August 2007	19 May 2013	152	5
Scotland	Stewart Fraser	18 September 1957	29 October 1966	246	15
Scotland	Kevin Gallacher	11 December 1985	20 January 1990	188	40
Scotland	Paul Gallacher	26 February 2000	16 May 2004	138	0
Scotland	Bobby Gardiner	16 December 1933	10 April 1943	166	66
Scotland	George Gardiner	10 August 1929	22 April 1933	141	7
Scotland	Pat Gardner	29 January 1972	12 October 1974	113	24
Scotland	Dennis Gillespie	5 September 1959	27 February 1971	455	115
Senegal	Morgaro Gomis	1 January 2007	11 May 2014	201	7
Scotland	David Goodwillie	31 December 2005	5 January 2014	158	46
Scotland	Alan Gordon	31 March 1969	15 January 1972	104	41
Scotland	Alex Gordon	18 February 1961	19 April 1965	106	1
Scotland	Richard Gough	22 April 1981	16 August 1986	256	37
Scotland	George Grant	7 December 1946	6 November 1954	244	51
Scotland	David Hannah	13 February 1993	6 March 2002	183	24
Scotland	Johnny Hart	14 August 1926	19 April 1930	131	28
Scotland	Paul Hegarty	16 November 1974	17 October 1989	707	82
Scotland	Jim Henry	25 October 1969	5 January 1974	130	12
Scotland	John Holt	19 January 1974	12 September 1987	405	24
Scotland	Doug Houston	30 March 1974	23 April 1977	107	5
Scotland	Duncan Hutchison	13 August 1927	29 April 1939	215	122
Scotland	Jim Irvine	19 August 1959	9 May 1964	160	76
Scotland	Darren Jackson	17 December 1988	2 May 1992	110	37
Scotland	Alex Jardine	9 March 1946	4 February 1950	108	2
Scotland	Grant Johnson	7 March 1992	21 September 1996	101	11
Scotland	Jacky Kay	13 August 1927	13 April 1936	249	91
Scotland	Jock Kay	18 August 1923	14 April 1928	191	3
Scotland	Garry Kenneth	5 February 2005	6 May 2012	193	7
Scotland	Mark Kerr	9 August 2003	22 May 2008	188	5
Scotland	Billy Kirkwood	20 April 1977	25 August 1987	399	70
Scotland	Frank Kopel	29 January 1972	24 October 1981	407	13
Yugoslavia	Miodrag Krivokapić	20 September 1988	5 January 1993	108	1
Scotland	Willie Linn	11 November 1911	29 April 1922	129	33
Scotland	Don Mackay	11 August 1962	25 March 1972	243	0
Scotland	Piper Mackay	16 January 1943	15 November 1947	128	17
Scotland	Gary Mackay-Steven	21 July 2011	27 September 2014	115*	23
Scotland	Alan Main	24 March 1987	1 October 1994	187	0
Scotland	Maurice Malpas	21 November 1981	21 May 2000	830	26
Scotland	Stuart Markland	28 August 1968	3 March 1973	106	3
Scotland	Hamish McAlpine	8 March 1969	9 October 1985	688	3
Scotland	David McCracken	2 May 2000	19 May 2007	203	8
Scotland	Jock McDonald	15 August 1925	31 March 1928	115	11
Scotland	Jim McInally	20 September 1986	10 May 1997	395	22
Scotland	Chic McIntosh	8 August 1931	17 March 1934	100	0
Scotland	Jim McIntyre	28 July 2001	6 May 2006	164	43
Scotland	Peter McKay	13 September 1947	31 March 1954	241	203
Scotland	Billy McKinlay	22 November 1986	30 September 1995	284	31
Scotland	Ray McKinnon	8 April 1989	2 May 1998	122	13
Scotland	Andy McLaren	27 August 1991	25 September 2004	250	23
Scotland	Gary McSwegan	7 October 1995	4 October 1998	119	47
Scotland	Tommy Millar	17 April 1962	4 January 1969	282	10
Scotland	Charlie Miller	4 November 2000	16 May 2004	135	19
Scotland	Arthur Milne	28 November 1934	11 May 1940	111	109
Scotland	Ralph Milne	28 July 1979	10 December 1986	286	75
Scotland	George Mitchell	1 January 1949	22 March 1952	101	10
Scotland	Ian Mitchell	29 September 1962	28 April 1973	314	133
Scotland	David Narey	21 November 1973	2 April 1994	872	36
Scotland	Tommy Neilson	24 October 1959	17 April 1968	316	11
Sweden	Kjell Olofsson	26 October 1996	23 May 1999	119	46
Finland	Mixu Paatelainen	31 October 1987	21 March 1992	173	47
Scotland	Jim Paterson	12 September 1998	25 January 2004	126	6
Scotland	Graeme Payne	11 August 1973	30 November 1983	293	21
Scotland	Frank Penson	9 August 1930	22 April 1933	108	0
Slovakia	Dušan Perniš	9 January 2010	13 May 2012	116	0
Scotland	Mark Perry	12 December 1992	25 April 1998	159	4
Sweden	Örjan Persson	5 December 1964	3 May 1967	101	17
Scotland	Iain Phillip	16 December 1978	19 March 1983	149	1
Scotland	Steven Pressley	12 August 1995	2 May 1998	129	6
Scotland	Frank Quinn	1 September 1948	13 March 1954	200	109
Scotland	John Rankin	14 July 2011	27 September 2014	140*	10
Scotland	Ian Redford	17 August 1985	22 October 1988	155	32
Scotland	Alex Reid	10 August 1968	28 August 1976	147	20
Scotland	David Robertson	21 January 2006	15 May 2011	145	20
Scotland	Scott Robertson	11 August 2008	13 May 2012	126	12
Scotland	Barry Robson	9 August 2003	26 January 2008	166	37
Scotland	Andy Rolland	30 September 1967	4 February 1978	440	37
Scotland	Bobby Ross	6 January 1945	13 August 1952	219	2
Scotland	George Ross	6 February 1929	25 September 1943	159	65
Scotland	Johnny Russell	12 May 2007	19 May 2013	121	45
Trinidad and Tobago	Collin Samuel	9 August 2003	19 May 2007	132	15
Scotland	Tommy Simpson	22 December 1923	30 April 1927	105	15
Scotland	Dave Skelligan	10 August 1935	29 April 1939	129	17
Scotland	Ian Smart	9 August 1941	14 April 1952	144	17
Scotland	Doug Smith	22 April 1959	31 January 1976	628	27
Scotland	Walter Smith	20 March 1967	24 September 1980	183	3
Scotland	Derek Stark	2 May 1978	30 April 1984	247	111
Scotland	David Sturrock	14 January 1956	14 November 1959	110	26
Scotland	Paul Sturrock	18 September 1974	13 May 1989	576	171
Scotland	Danny Swanson	2 January 2008	13 May 2012	127	12
Scotland	Bill Taylor	26 November 1927	11 March 1933	209	1
Scotland	Steven Thompson	3 May 1997	29 December 2002	163	32
Scotland	Billy Thomson	11 August 1984	3 October 1990	234	0
Scotland	Tommy Traynor	8 August 1970	30 August 1975	176	23
Netherlands	Freddy van der Hoorn	12 August 1989	19 February 1994	205	5
Scotland	Dave Walker	15 August 1925	12 January 1929	120	20
Scotland	Keith Watson	16 January 2007	27 September 2014	145*	11
Scotland	Brian Welsh	11 May 1987	16 May 1996	177	14
Scotland	Davie Wilson	12 August 1967	3 January 1972	169	27
Scotland	Mark Wilson	5 January 2002	11 May 2014	157*	11
Scotland	Robbie Winters	19 November 1994	22 August 1998	149	42
Scotland	Bob Wyllie	19 November 1949	18 April 1953	109	0
Scotland	Ron Yeats	2 January 1958	1 April 1961	118	1
Sweden	Lars Zetterlund	2 November 1996	3 March 1999	100	8
