= Dundee (disambiguation) =

Dundee is the fourth-largest city in Scotland by population.

Dundee may also refer to:

== Places ==
=== Australia ===
- Dundee, New South Wales, a rural locality
- Dundee Beach, Northern Territory, a locality

=== Canada ===
- Dundee, New Brunswick, a community
- Dundee, Nova Scotia, a community
- Dundee, Quebec, a township municipality

=== Scotland ===
- Dundee (Parliament of Scotland constituency), a pre-1707 constituency
- Dundee (UK Parliament constituency), a former parliamentary constituency (1832-1950)

=== United States ===
- Dundee, Alabama, an unincorporated place
- Dundee, Florida, a town
- Dundee, Indiana, an unincorporated community
- Dundee, Iowa, a city
- Dundee, Kansas, an unincorporated community
- Dundee, Kentucky, an unincorporated community
- Dundee, Michigan, a village
- Dundee, Minnesota, a city
- Dundee, Mississippi, an unincorporated community
- Dundee, Missouri, an unincorporated community
- Dundee, Nebraska, a neighborhood in Omaha, Nebraska
  - Dundee Dell, a bar and restaurant in Omaha
- Dundee, New York, a village
- Dundee, Ohio, a census-designated place
- Dundee, Oklahoma, an unincorporated community
- Dundee, Oregon, a city
- Dundee, Texas, an unincorporated place
- Dundee, Virginia, an unincorporated community
- Dundee, Wisconsin, an unincorporated community
- Dundee Township, Illinois
- Dundee Township, Michigan
- Dundee Township, Walsh County, North Dakota
- Dundee Canal, New Jersey, an industrial canal from 1861 to c. the 1930s

=== Elsewhere ===
- Dundee, KwaZulu-Natal, South Africa, a town
- Dundee Island, Antarctica

== Businesses ==
- Dundee Brewing Company, a Rochester, New York–based beer brewery
- Dundee Corporation, a Canadian financial, real estate and mining holding company
- Dundee Shipbuilders Company, a defunct shipbuilding company which was based in Dundee, Scotland

== Maritime vessels ==
- HMS Dundee (1909), an armed boarding steamer of the First World War
- HMS Dundee (L84), a sloop of the Second World War
- SS Dundee, a British steam passenger and cargo ship torpedoed in the First World War
- Dundee (ship), a ship wrecked off the coast of New South Wales, Australia in 1808

== Sports ==
- Dundee F.C.
- Dundee United F.C.
- Dundee Handball Club
- Dundee HSFP, Scottish rugby union team
- Dundee Sports Dome, Moncton, New Brunswick, Canada

== Schools ==
- University of Dundee, one of Scotland's main universities
- Dundee College, a former College in Dundee, Scotland, now part of Dundee and Angus College
- Dundee High School (disambiguation)

== Titles ==
- Earl of Dundee a title in the Peerage of Scotland
- Viscount of Dundee, a defunct title in the Peerage of Scotland

== People ==
- Dundee (surname)

== Other ==
- Dundee cake, a type of fruitcake
- Michael "Crocodile" Dundee, the title character of the "Crocodile Dundee" series of films
- Dundee, tune to which the hymn "God Moves in a Mysterious Way" is sung
- Dundee Institute of Architects, a professional body for architects based in Dundee, Scotland
- The Dundee Society, group of U.S. National Security Agency cryptologists and cryptanalysts
- Dundee International Book Prize, a UK prize for debut novelists
- Dundee, a fictional cat in "The Pirate's Chest" bookstore in the Cat Who series by Lilian Jackson Braun
- "Dundee" (Succession), a second-series episode of the HBO television show Succession
- Dundee (slang), a Nigerian slang

== See also ==
- Upper Dundee, New Brunswick, an unincorporated community
- New Dundee, Ontario, Canada, a community
- East Dundee, Illinois, United States, a village
- West Dundee, Illinois, United States, a village
- Dundy (disambiguation)
