= Eden Brewery =

Eden Brewery may refer to:

- Eden Brewery St Andrews
- Eden Brewery, Penrith
