= Dundee City =

Dundee is a city in Scotland, a constituent country of the United Kingdom.

Dundee City may also refer to:

- Dundee City (council area), a unitary district established in 1996
  - Dundee City Council, the local authority body in the city
- City of Dundee District (1975–1996), a district of Tayside region from 1975 to 1996
  - City of Dundee District Council (1975–1996), the local authority of the district
- City and royal burgh of Dundee (ca. 1191–1894), the initial area governed by the Dundee Corporation
- County of the city of Dundee (1894–1975), the "county of city" area
- Dundee Corporation (ca. 1191–1975), the local authority body of the burgh of Dundee and the county of city of Dundee
- Dundee Town Council, a name used interchangeably with Dundee Corporation
- Dundee (settlement), the joined area of the localities: Dundee, Monifieth and Invergowrie
- Dundee City Centre, the central area of Dundee

== See also ==
- Dundee (disambiguation)
