= Captain John Hart =

Captain John Hart may refer to:

- Captain John Hart (Torchwood), fictional character on Torchwood TV Series
- John Hart (South Australian colonist) (1809–1873), sailor, businessman, and premier of South Australia

== See also ==
- John Hart (disambiguation)
