= Jack Hart =

Jack Hart may refer to:

- Jack Hart (state senator), American lawyer and member of the Massachusetts Senate
- Jack Hart (rugby union) (born 1998), South African rugby union player
- Jack Hart, ringname of Barry Horowitz
- Jack Hart, known better as Jack of Hearts, a Marvel Comics character

== See also ==
- Jack Harte (disambiguation)
- John Hart (disambiguation)
- Jack Hart-Davis (1900–1963), cricket umpire
