= Alex Arnold =

Alex or Alexander Arnold may refer to:

- Alex Arnold (footballer) (1928–2017), former Scottish footballer
- Alexander Arnold (actor) (born 1992), English actor
- Alexander A. Arnold (1833–1915), American politician in Wisconsin

== See also ==
- Trent Alexander-Arnold (born 1998), English footballer
