= Örjan Persson =

Swedish footballer

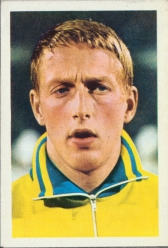
- Persson in the 1970 FIFA World Cup

Personal information
- Date of birth: 27 August 1942 (age 84)
- Place of birth: Uddevalla, Sweden
- Height: 1.80 m (5 ft 11 in)
- Position: Midfielder

Senior career*
Years	Team	Apps	(Gls)
1957–1960	Smögens IF		
1961–1964	Örgryte IS	81	(12)
1964–1967	Dundee United	77	(15)
1967–1970	Rangers	72	(22)
1971–1974	Örgryte IS	87	(12)
1975–1977	Kungsbacka BI		
1978–1980	IF Väster		

International career
1962–1974	Sweden	48	(7)
- * Club domestic league appearances and goals

Per Örjan Persson (27 August 1942) is a Swedish former football player who played as a midfielder. He played for Scottish clubs Dundee United and Rangers in the 1960s. He also represented Sweden at the 1970 FIFA World Cup in Mexico and the 1974 FIFA World Cup in West Germany.

== Career ==
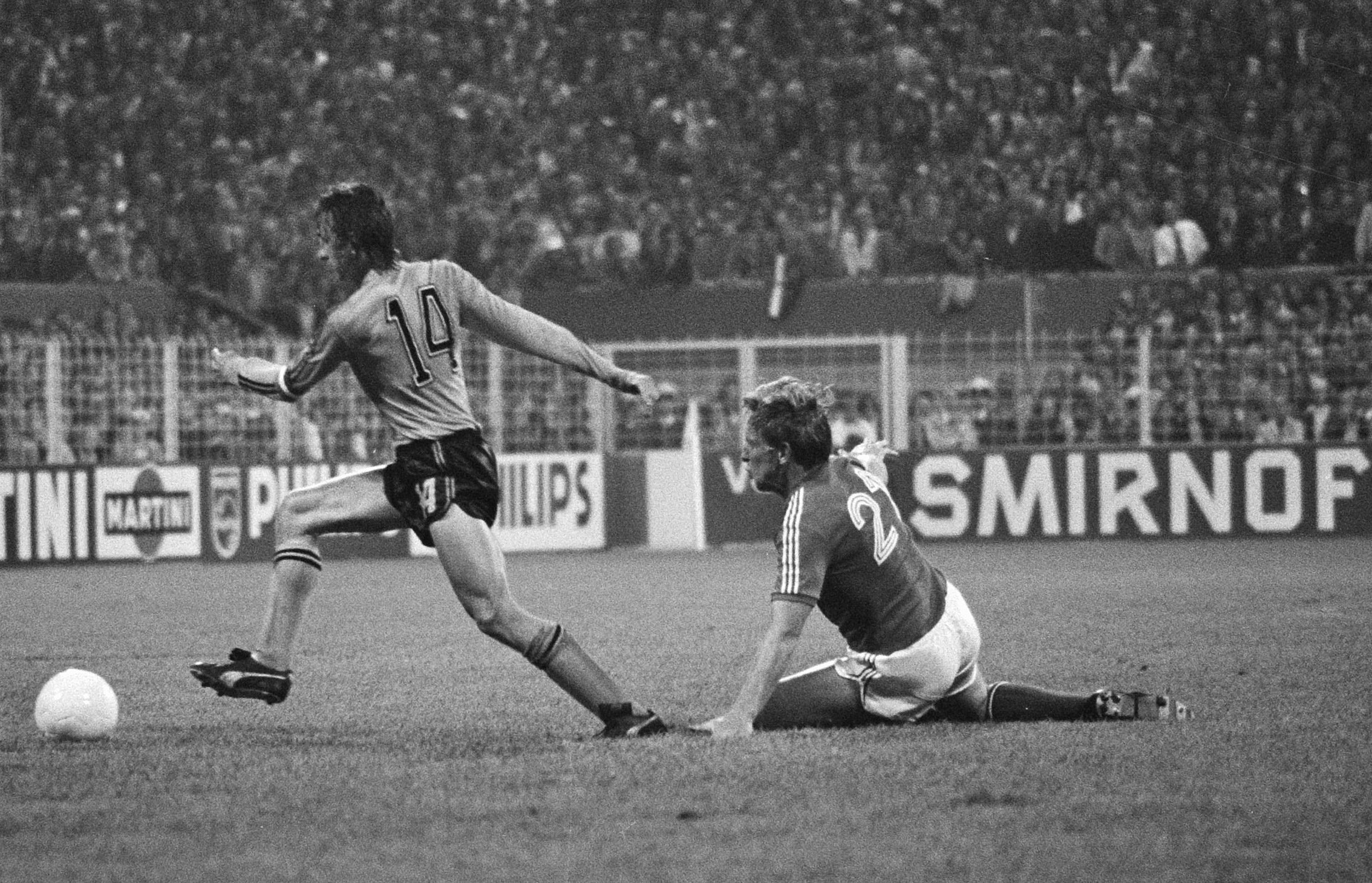
Persson (right) and Johan Cruyff of the Netherlands at the 1974 FIFA World Cup.

Persson was the first of five Scandinavian imports signed by Dundee United manager Jerry Kerr who was one of the first managers in Scotland to tap into the Scandinavian market to find talented and experienced players at an affordable price. Persson moved to Tannadice from Örgryte IS on 2 December 1964, the first overseas player to join the club. As there was no professionalism in Swedish football in the 1960s United did not have to pay a transfer fee. He made his debut along with the Danish striker Finn Døssing. United had made a poor start to the 1964–65 First Division season and appeared to be heading towards relegation, which would have undone the great work done by Kerr since leading the team to promotion in 1959–60. Since then the club had enjoyed their longest ever spell in the top flight and were becoming established as a permanent fixture in the First Division although relegation in the Spring of 1965 may have doomed the club to obscurity.

Kerr had taken a gamble in bringing players with no experience in Scottish football, like Mogens Berg and Lennart Wing, to the club to help fight relegation. The gamble paid off, and Persson's classy play on the wing and pinpoint crosses being complementary to Døssing's huge goal scoring talent. United managed mid-table security by the end of the season. In the following 1965–66 season Persson played a crucial role in helping United to finish in 5th place in the league qualifying for Europe for the first time. The 1966–67 was to be Persson's last at Tannadice, but arguably his most successful. Scoring 11 goals in 29 appearances from the wing as well as helping United to two victories over FC Barcelona and one over Juventus in the Fairs Cup.

Persson was immensely popular at United playing in 101 matches and scoring 17 goals. He has the distinction (shared with fellow countryman Lennart Wing) of being the first Dundee United player to win a full international cap. He won a total of 9 Sweden caps while with United.

He moved to Rangers in May 1967 where he played 113 games, scored 31 goals (often spectacular ones) and won 6 caps, representing his country at the World Cup in 1970. Later that year he returned to Örgryte IS and went on to play for Sweden at the 1974 World Cup.
