= 1938–39 Division 3 (Swedish football) =

Swedish League Division 3
- Season: 1938–39
- Champions: Iggesunds IK; Sandvikens AIK; Nynäshamns IF; IFK Kumla; Katrineholms AIK; IF Örnen; Finspångs AIK; Olofströms IF; Skara IF; Skogens IF; Ängelholms IF
- Promoted: 8 teams
- Relegated: 22 teams

Statistics of Swedish football Division 3 for the 1938–39 season.

== League standings ==
=== Uppsvenska Östra 1938–39 ===
| Pos | Team | Pld | W | D | L | GF | GA | GD | Pts | Qualification or relegation |
|---|---|---|---|---|---|---|---|---|---|---|
| 1 | Iggesunds IK | 16 | 10 | 4 | 2 | 47 | 11 | +36 | 24 | Promotion Playoffs |
| 2 | Ala IF | 16 | 9 | 2 | 5 | 33 | 25 | +8 | 20 | |
| 3 | Strands IF, Hudiksvall | 16 | 8 | 3 | 5 | 30 | 28 | +2 | 19 | |
| 4 | GIF Sundsvall | 16 | 7 | 3 | 6 | 28 | 34 | −6 | 17 | |
| 5 | Skärgårdens IF, Sandarne | 16 | 6 | 4 | 6 | 37 | 31 | +6 | 16 | |
| 6 | Kramfors IF | 16 | 7 | 2 | 7 | 39 | 41 | −2 | 16 | |
| 7 | Söderhamns IF | 16 | 6 | 1 | 9 | 24 | 28 | −4 | 13 | |
| 8 | Kubikenborgs IF | 16 | 3 | 4 | 9 | 22 | 50 | −28 | 10 | Relegated |
| 9 | IFK Bergvik | 16 | 2 | 5 | 9 | 29 | 41 | −12 | 9 | Relegated |

=== Uppsvenska Västra 1938–39 ===
| Pos | Team | Pld | W | D | L | GF | GA | GD | Pts | Qualification or relegation |
|---|---|---|---|---|---|---|---|---|---|---|
| 1 | Sandvikens AIK | 18 | 12 | 2 | 4 | 51 | 21 | +30 | 26 | Promotion Playoffs |
| 2 | Örtakoloniens IF, Sandviken | 18 | 11 | 4 | 3 | 43 | 23 | +20 | 26 | |
| 3 | Brynäs IF, Gävle | 18 | 10 | 5 | 3 | 46 | 30 | +16 | 25 | |
| 4 | Hofors AIF | 18 | 10 | 2 | 6 | 45 | 31 | +14 | 22 | |
| 5 | Avesta AIK | 18 | 7 | 6 | 5 | 32 | 32 | 0 | 20 | |
| 6 | Forsbacka IK | 18 | 6 | 4 | 8 | 25 | 28 | −3 | 16 | |
| 7 | Skutskärs IF | 18 | 6 | 4 | 8 | 26 | 31 | −5 | 16 | |
| 8 | Fagersta AIK | 18 | 5 | 4 | 9 | 40 | 40 | 0 | 14 | |
| 9 | Avesta IF | 18 | 5 | 2 | 11 | 35 | 70 | −35 | 12 | Relegated |
| 10 | Långshyttans AIK | 18 | 0 | 3 | 15 | 21 | 58 | −37 | 3 | Relegated |

=== Östsvenska 1938–39 ===
| Pos | Team | Pld | W | D | L | GF | GA | GD | Pts | Promotion or relegation |
|---|---|---|---|---|---|---|---|---|---|---|
| 1 | Nynäshamns IF | 18 | 14 | 1 | 3 | 70 | 29 | +41 | 29 | Promoted |
| 2 | Enskede IK | 18 | 11 | 2 | 5 | 61 | 28 | +33 | 24 | |
| 3 | Sundbybergs IK | 18 | 10 | 3 | 5 | 41 | 25 | +16 | 23 | |
| 4 | Årsta SK, Stockholm | 18 | 11 | 1 | 6 | 52 | 32 | +20 | 23 | |
| 5 | IF Vesta, Uppsala | 18 | 8 | 3 | 7 | 47 | 32 | +15 | 19 | |
| 6 | Lunda SK, Märsta | 18 | 8 | 2 | 8 | 47 | 57 | −10 | 18 | |
| 7 | Enebybergs IF | 18 | 6 | 1 | 11 | 30 | 46 | −16 | 13 | |
| 8 | IK Sture, Stockholm | 18 | 4 | 5 | 9 | 33 | 58 | −25 | 13 | |
| 9 | Heby AIF | 18 | 5 | 1 | 12 | 33 | 63 | −30 | 11 | Relegated |
| 10 | Karlbergs BK, Stockholm | 18 | 3 | 1 | 14 | 33 | 77 | −44 | 7 | Relegated |

=== Centralserien Norra 1938–39 ===
| Pos | Team | Pld | W | D | L | GF | GA | GD | Pts | Promotion or relegation |
|---|---|---|---|---|---|---|---|---|---|---|
| 1 | IFK Kumla | 18 | 11 | 5 | 2 | 37 | 17 | +20 | 27 | Promotion Playoffs – Promoted |
| 2 | Örebro IK | 18 | 12 | 3 | 3 | 51 | 28 | +23 | 27 | |
| 3 | Örebro SK | 18 | 9 | 5 | 4 | 44 | 30 | +14 | 23 | |
| 4 | Kolsva IF | 18 | 8 | 3 | 7 | 35 | 31 | +4 | 19 | |
| 5 | IFK Örebro | 18 | 7 | 4 | 7 | 36 | 37 | −1 | 18 | |
| 6 | Laxå IF | 18 | 4 | 8 | 6 | 28 | 31 | −3 | 16 | |
| 7 | IFK Lindesberg | 18 | 6 | 3 | 9 | 40 | 51 | −11 | 15 | |
| 8 | IK Svenske, Örebro | 18 | 4 | 7 | 7 | 34 | 46 | −12 | 15 | |
| 9 | IFK Nora | 18 | 3 | 4 | 11 | 19 | 35 | −16 | 10 | Relegated |
| 10 | IFK Hallsberg | 18 | 3 | 4 | 11 | 27 | 45 | −18 | 10 | Relegated |

=== Centralserien Södra 1938–39 ===
| Pos | Team | Pld | W | D | L | GF | GA | GD | Pts | Qualification or relegation |
|---|---|---|---|---|---|---|---|---|---|---|
| 1 | Katrineholms AIK | 18 | 13 | 2 | 3 | 62 | 17 | +45 | 28 | Promotion Playoffs |
| 2 | Katrineholms SK | 18 | 12 | 4 | 2 | 46 | 14 | +32 | 28 | |
| 3 | Västerås SK | 18 | 14 | 0 | 4 | 50 | 27 | +23 | 28 | |
| 4 | IK City, Eskilstuna | 18 | 9 | 4 | 5 | 39 | 19 | +20 | 22 | |
| 5 | Nyköpings AIK | 18 | 10 | 2 | 6 | 50 | 36 | +14 | 22 | |
| 6 | IF Verdandi, Eskilstuna | 18 | 8 | 3 | 7 | 32 | 36 | −4 | 19 | |
| 7 | Västerås IK | 18 | 6 | 1 | 11 | 30 | 48 | −18 | 13 | |
| 8 | Nyköpings SK | 18 | 4 | 1 | 13 | 32 | 57 | −25 | 9 | |
| 9 | Södertälje FF | 18 | 4 | 1 | 13 | 22 | 60 | −38 | 9 | Relegated |
| 10 | IFK Arboga | 18 | 1 | 0 | 17 | 22 | 81 | −59 | 2 | Relegated |

=== Nordvästra 1938–39 ===
| Pos | Team | Pld | W | D | L | GF | GA | GD | Pts | Promotion or relegation |
|---|---|---|---|---|---|---|---|---|---|---|
| 1 | IF Örnen, Kristinehamn | 18 | 11 | 5 | 2 | 53 | 27 | +26 | 27 | Promoted |
| 2 | IFK Kristinehamn | 18 | 9 | 3 | 6 | 29 | 28 | +1 | 21 | |
| 3 | Karlstads BIK | 18 | 9 | 2 | 7 | 49 | 34 | +15 | 20 | |
| 4 | IFK Åmål | 18 | 9 | 2 | 7 | 37 | 31 | +6 | 20 | |
| 5 | IFK Bofors | 18 | 9 | 2 | 7 | 42 | 41 | +1 | 20 | |
| 6 | Forshaga IF | 18 | 6 | 6 | 6 | 41 | 28 | +13 | 18 | |
| 7 | Fengerfors IK | 18 | 7 | 3 | 8 | 38 | 44 | −6 | 17 | |
| 8 | IFK Sunne | 18 | 7 | 2 | 9 | 45 | 53 | −8 | 16 | |
| 9 | Håfreströms IF | 18 | 6 | 3 | 9 | 32 | 46 | −14 | 15 | Relegated |
| 10 | Arvika IS | 18 | 1 | 4 | 13 | 24 | 58 | −34 | 6 | Relegated |

=== Mellansvenska 1938–39 ===
| Pos | Team | Pld | W | D | L | GF | GA | GD | Pts | Promotion or relegation |
|---|---|---|---|---|---|---|---|---|---|---|
| 1 | Finspångs AIK | 18 | 13 | 1 | 4 | 71 | 24 | +47 | 27 | Promoted |
| 2 | BK Derby, Linköping | 18 | 11 | 3 | 4 | 68 | 31 | +37 | 25 | |
| 3 | IFK Oskarshamn | 18 | 11 | 2 | 5 | 59 | 36 | +23 | 24 | |
| 4 | Waggeryds IK | 18 | 9 | 3 | 6 | 61 | 42 | +19 | 21 | |
| 5 | Åtvidabergs FF | 18 | 7 | 5 | 6 | 50 | 48 | +2 | 19 | |
| 6 | Vetlanda FF | 18 | 5 | 5 | 8 | 45 | 59 | −14 | 15 | |
| 7 | Norrahammars GIF | 18 | 5 | 5 | 8 | 33 | 58 | −25 | 15 | |
| 8 | Karle IF | 18 | 6 | 2 | 10 | 33 | 55 | −22 | 14 | |
| 9 | Boxholms IF | 18 | 4 | 2 | 12 | 37 | 74 | −37 | 10 | Relegated |
| 10 | Skeninge IK, Skänninge | 18 | 2 | 6 | 10 | 26 | 56 | −30 | 10 | Relegated |

=== Sydöstra 1938–39 ===
| Pos | Team | Pld | W | D | L | GF | GA | GD | Pts | Promotion or relegation |
|---|---|---|---|---|---|---|---|---|---|---|
| 1 | Olofströms IF | 18 | 12 | 4 | 2 | 51 | 16 | +35 | 28 | Promoted |
| 2 | Kalmar FF | 18 | 10 | 2 | 6 | 39 | 29 | +10 | 22 | |
| 3 | Nybro IF | 18 | 9 | 3 | 6 | 44 | 29 | +15 | 21 | |
| 4 | Lessebo GIF | 18 | 9 | 3 | 6 | 43 | 42 | +1 | 21 | |
| 5 | Hovmantorps GIF | 18 | 8 | 3 | 7 | 37 | 35 | +2 | 19 | |
| 6 | Kallinge SK | 18 | 7 | 3 | 8 | 27 | 37 | −10 | 17 | |
| 7 | IFK Karlshamn | 18 | 5 | 6 | 7 | 32 | 37 | −5 | 16 | |
| 8 | Anderstorps IF | 18 | 6 | 3 | 9 | 46 | 51 | −5 | 15 | |
| 9 | Emmaboda IS | 18 | 5 | 4 | 9 | 40 | 51 | −11 | 14 | Relegated |
| 10 | Blomstermåla IK | 18 | 2 | 3 | 13 | 20 | 52 | −32 | 7 | Relegated |

=== Västsvenska Norra 1938–39 ===
| Pos | Team | Pld | W | D | L | GF | GA | GD | Pts | Promotion or relegation |
|---|---|---|---|---|---|---|---|---|---|---|
| 1 | Skara IF | 18 | 11 | 3 | 4 | 57 | 24 | +33 | 25 | Promotion Playoffs – Promoted |
| 2 | IFK Trollhättan | 18 | 11 | 2 | 5 | 32 | 26 | +6 | 24 | |
| 3 | Trollhättans IF | 18 | 10 | 0 | 8 | 30 | 29 | +1 | 20 | |
| 4 | IFK Uddevalla | 18 | 9 | 1 | 8 | 36 | 27 | +9 | 19 | |
| 5 | Kungshamns IF | 18 | 8 | 3 | 7 | 44 | 43 | +1 | 19 | |
| 6 | Alingsås IF | 18 | 7 | 3 | 8 | 31 | 34 | −3 | 17 | |
| 7 | Munkedals IF | 18 | 7 | 2 | 9 | 27 | 39 | −12 | 16 | |
| 8 | Vänersborgs IF | 18 | 7 | 1 | 10 | 34 | 38 | −4 | 15 | |
| 9 | IF Heimer, Lidköping | 18 | 5 | 3 | 10 | 26 | 37 | −11 | 13 | Relegated |
| 10 | Smögens IF | 18 | 5 | 2 | 11 | 19 | 39 | −20 | 12 | Relegated |

=== Västsvenska Södra 1938–39 ===
| Pos | Team | Pld | W | D | L | GF | GA | GD | Pts | Qualification or relegation |
|---|---|---|---|---|---|---|---|---|---|---|
| 1 | Skogens IF, Göteborg | 18 | 12 | 4 | 2 | 53 | 21 | +32 | 28 | Promotion Playoffs |
| 2 | Falkenbergs FF | 18 | 11 | 4 | 3 | 52 | 22 | +30 | 26 | |
| 3 | Kinna IF | 18 | 12 | 1 | 5 | 53 | 31 | +22 | 25 | |
| 4 | Lundby IF, Göteborg | 18 | 10 | 3 | 5 | 46 | 24 | +22 | 23 | |
| 5 | Majornas IK, Göteborg | 18 | 7 | 3 | 8 | 39 | 39 | 0 | 17 | |
| 6 | Krokslätts FF, Mölndal | 18 | 6 | 4 | 8 | 36 | 31 | +5 | 16 | |
| 7 | Hisingstads IS, Hisingen | 18 | 5 | 3 | 10 | 25 | 44 | −19 | 13 | |
| 8 | Varbergs GIF | 18 | 5 | 3 | 10 | 28 | 62 | −34 | 13 | |
| 9 | Göteborgs AIK | 18 | 3 | 4 | 11 | 22 | 45 | −23 | 10 | Relegated |
| 10 | IF Leikin, Halmstad | 18 | 3 | 3 | 12 | 30 | 65 | −35 | 9 | Relegated |

=== Sydsvenska 1938–39 ===
| Pos | Team | Pld | W | D | L | GF | GA | GD | Pts | Promotion or relegation |
|---|---|---|---|---|---|---|---|---|---|---|
| 1 | Ängelholms IF | 18 | 10 | 4 | 4 | 29 | 19 | +10 | 24 | Promoted |
| 2 | IFK Kristianstad | 18 | 10 | 2 | 6 | 48 | 33 | +15 | 22 | |
| 3 | IFK Höganäs | 18 | 10 | 0 | 8 | 43 | 29 | +14 | 20 | |
| 4 | Bjuvs IF | 18 | 9 | 2 | 7 | 45 | 40 | +5 | 20 | |
| 5 | Klippans BoIF | 18 | 8 | 3 | 7 | 42 | 34 | +8 | 19 | |
| 6 | IFK Hälsingborg | 18 | 8 | 3 | 7 | 32 | 38 | −6 | 19 | |
| 7 | IFK Hässleholm | 18 | 7 | 3 | 8 | 37 | 33 | +4 | 17 | |
| 8 | Stattena IF, Hälsingborg | 18 | 8 | 0 | 10 | 30 | 32 | −2 | 16 | |
| 9 | Hälsans BK, Hälsingborg | 18 | 6 | 3 | 9 | 25 | 43 | −18 | 15 | Relegated |
| 10 | Ystads IF | 18 | 2 | 4 | 12 | 18 | 48 | −30 | 8 | Relegated |
