= Paul Sturrock =

Scottish footballer and manager (born 1956)

Personal information
- Full name: Paul Whitehead Sturrock
- Date of birth: 10 October 1956 (age 70)
- Place of birth: Ellon, Scotland
- Position: Striker

Youth career
- Grandtully Vale
- 1972–1973: Vale of Atholl
- 1973–1974: Bankfoot Athletic

Senior career*
Years	Team	Apps	(Gls)
1974–1989	Dundee United	385	(109)

International career
1977–1982	Scotland under-21	9	(0)
1981–1987	Scotland	20	(3)

Managerial career
- 1993–1998: St Johnstone
- 1998–2000: Dundee United
- 2000–2004: Plymouth Argyle
- 2004: Southampton
- 2004–2006: Sheffield Wednesday
- 2006–2007: Swindon Town
- 2007–2009: Plymouth Argyle
- 2010–2013: Southend United
- 2015: Yeovil Town
- * Club domestic league appearances and goals

Paul Whitehead Sturrock (born 10 October 1956) is a Scottish former football coach and former player.

As a player, Sturrock spent his entire senior career with Dundee United, making more than five hundred appearances between 1974 and 1989. He won the Scottish Football League title with United in 1982–83 and the Scottish League Cup twice, in 1979 and 1980. He was named the SFWA Footballer of the Year in 1982. At international level, Sturrock played twenty times for Scotland and appeared at the 1982 and 1986 World Cups.

Sturrock's managerial career began with St Johnstone in 1993, where he went on to win the Scottish First Division title in 1996–97 before returning to Dundee United as manager. Since 2000, Sturrock has worked as a manager in English football, initially with Plymouth Argyle where he helped the club to win two promotions before moving on to a brief spell with Southampton. He has subsequently also managed Sheffield Wednesday, Swindon Town and Southend United as well as returning to Plymouth for a second spell. He became Yeovil Town manager in April 2015, but left the club eight months later. According to an analysis by the Financial Times he was among the country's best ever managers, even though he has mostly managed clubs at Championship level and below.

He is known by fans as Luggy (from the Scots language word lugs, Eng: ears). Sturrock announced in July 2008 that he was suffering from a mild form of Parkinson's disease. His son, Blair, was also a professional footballer.

== Early life ==
Sturrock was born in Ellon, Aberdeenshire, and grew up in Pitlochry, Perthshire, where he was educated at the local primary and secondary schools and played for amateur side Grandtully Vale. In 1972, he joined Vale of Atholl of the Perthshire Amateur First Division (where he returned as coach in his latter days with Dundee United), and in the 1972–73 season he scored approximately 100 goals. He then moved on to Bankfoot Athletic, and in the 1973–74 season he scored 53 goals as they finished 2nd in the Scottish Junior FA First Division. He had trials with Morton and St Johnstone, but was signed for Dundee United by then manager Jim McLean on 1 July 1974.

== Club career ==
Sturrock made his debut in the European Cup Winners' Cup match v Juil Petrosani of Romania on 18 September 1974 and his league debut on 28 December 1974 as a substitute against Motherwell.

In his first season at Tannadice he made nine League appearances and came on from the substitutes' bench for three more and in the process he scored six goals. His first goal for Dundee United was one of two he scored in a 2–2 draw with Rangers at Tannadice on 5 April 1975. Dundee United finished fourth in the League that year. In the following season, he made 18 League appearances, eight as sub, and scored three times. He was also played as a substitute in two of the three Scottish Cup ties and was on from the start in five out of six League Cup games and scored once. He also started in three of the four UEFA Cup games netting one in that competition, too.

1976–77 not only saw Dundee United consolidate their Premier League position but throughout the campaign Sturrock was an ever-present, playing in all 36 League games and scoring 15 times. Adding that total to one each in the Scottish Cup and League Cup he was top scorer at the Club that year. He played in United's only Scottish Cup tie, a 4–1 defeat at St Mirren. He also appeared four times plus once as sub out of the six League Cup ties. In a short-lived Anglo Scottish Cup campaign he was brought on as sub in one leg of the tie against Aberdeen.

In 1982–83, Dundee United won the Scottish League Championship, losing only four League games during the season. Sturrock contributed to this success with eight goals in his 28 appearances. He also set up Ralph Milne for his fourth-minute opener against Dundee in the final League game. The Scottish Cup that year had been yet another early exit at the hands of St Mirren. Sturrock scored seven in the nine games he turned out in on the way to a League Cup quarter-final exit. He also played in seven of the eight games and scored once in a UEFA Cup run that ended with an exit in Prague.

His playing career came to an end in 1989, with his final goal for United occurring on 8 April 1989 in a 2-1 victory against local rivals Dundee. Over the course of his playing career from 1974 to 1989, he made 385 league appearances for the club and scored 109 goals. When considering all competitions, he amassed a total of 171 goals in 576 games, which places him as the second-highest goal scorer in Dundee United's history. Following his playing career, Sturrock remained at Tannadice for the next five years in a coaching role. After twenty years of continuous service, he eventually departed the club in 1993.

In addition, Sturrock finished runner-up to Alan Rough for the Scottish Writers' award in 1981.

== International career ==
Sturrock made his first appearance for the Scotland under-21 team on 12 October 1976, in a goalless draw with Czechoslovakia. Four months later, he scored in a 3–2 win against Wales under-21s on 9 February 1977.

Sturrock made his full international debut for Scotland against Wales on 16 May 1981, and on 8 November 1981, he scored his first goal for Scotland in the 2–1 World Cup qualifier defeat against Portugal in Lisbon. Sturrock won 20 caps for his country, scoring three goals. He was a non-playing member of the Scotland squad for the 1982 World Cup finals in Spain and appeared twice in Mexico in 1986.

== Managerial career ==
In a 2012 study by Stefan Szymanski, economics professor at the University of Michigan, Sturrock was rated as one of the best managers in English football.

=== St Johnstone ===
In 1993, Sturrock became the manager of Premier Division team St Johnstone. The team were relegated to the First Division at the end of the 1993–94 season. It took a while for Sturrock to improve the club's fortunes, as they lost 4–0 to Stenhousemuir in the 1994–95 Scottish Cup, and he then collapsed in the dugout at Tannadice while managing St Johnstone against Dundee United during the 1995–96 season. While he was recovering in hospital from the collapse, Sturrock was called by his former international manager Alex Ferguson. Ferguson warned Sturrock that he was "trying to make bad players into good players" and to just get rid of the "bad pros" in his squad. Sturrock guided Saints to promotion back to the Premier Division in 1996–97, winning the First Division by 20 points. In their first season back in the Premier Division, St Johnstone finished in fifth place in 1997–98.

=== Dundee United ===
In September 1998 Sturrock was appointed manager at Dundee United. He made a bright start to his time as manager at Tannadice, where he was feted by the fans for his excellent spell as a player. His United team failed to recover from the sale of top scorer Billy Dodds in December 1999, when they were lying third in the table. The team scored few goals following Dodds's departure, and Sturrock resigned after two games of the 2000–01 season.

=== Plymouth Argyle ===
In October 2000 Sturrock joined Plymouth Argyle, a club which had reached the lowest ebb in its history, struggling in the English Football League Third Division. A shake-up at boardroom level took place, Sturrock began to build his own squad. The following season, he guided them to the Third Division title breaking numerous records in the process, including a club and league points total of 102. In October 2003, Sturrock had successfully taken Argyle back to the top of the Football League Second Division and left when Plymouth had just 12 games to play in what would prove to be another season when they would finish as divisional champions and return to the Football League Championship, formerly known as the First Division. As a result of his success at Home Park he was named as the manager of Argyle's Team of the Century in a BBC Devon poll.

=== Southampton ===
Sturrock was named as the successor to Gordon Strachan as manager of Southampton on 4 March 2004. On 23 August 2004, it was announced that Sturrock was leaving the club 'by mutual consent', after a disappointing run of form and rumours of player unrest and boardroom dissatisfaction with his management.

=== Sheffield Wednesday ===
Sturrock was then appointed by League One club Sheffield Wednesday languishing in 14th place on 23 September 2004, and he guided the club to the League One play-offs. After beating Brentford in the semi-final with an aggregate score of 3–1, Sturrock took Wednesday to the play-off final at the Millennium Stadium and beat Hartlepool United 4–2 after extra-time, winning promotion to the Championship. Despite numerous injuries to key players he helped Wednesday to finish 10 points clear of relegation in their first season back in The Championship.

A slow start to the 2006–07 season sparked rumours that Wednesday were about to sack Sturrock, but this speculation looked to be false when he agreed a new four-year contract on 14 September. But he was sacked on the evening of 19 October, just five weeks and three games after agreeing this new deal. The new contract was agreed while the club were at the bottom of the League, while he was sacked when they were fourth from bottom.

=== Swindon Town ===
In late October 2006, Swindon Town allowed their management team of Dennis Wise and Gustavo Poyet to join Leeds United. Swindon pounced at the opportunity to acquire the services of Sturrock and on 7 November 2006 Sturrock was confirmed as manager with Kevin Summerfield and John Blackley following him from Wednesday. Sturrock's first season in charge at Swindon was a success, achieving promotion from League Two to League One.

Swindon made a decent start to the 2007–08 season, maintaining their position in the top half of the league table after the first 8 games.

=== Return to Plymouth ===
On 27 November 2007, Sturrock resigned his post as Swindon Town manager after just over a year with the club to rejoin previous club Plymouth Argyle. Sturrock also brought back to the club assistants Kevin Summerfield and John Blackley, who were previously with him during his first successful spell as manager. Sturrock then proceeded to take the club to its highest league position in 20 years: tenth in the Championship. However, the team subsequently struggled and finished five points and one place outside the Championship relegation zone in the 2008–09 season. On 10 December 2009, Sturrock was removed as Plymouth Argyle manager and put into a business support role by chairman Sir Roy Gardner. On 22 April 2010, the Plymouth board confirmed that Sturrock had left his role within the club to pursue other managerial opportunities. Following Sturrock's departure, it emerged that the board had mis-managed the finances of the club and Argyle entered administration.

=== Southend United ===
On 5 July 2010, Sturrock was confirmed as manager of League Two Southend United. Former Salisbury City manager Tommy Widdrington was named as Sturrock's assistant manager while one of Sturrock's former players at Plymouth Argyle and Sheffield Wednesday, who served as captain at the latter, Graham Coughlan was soon appointed as a player-coach.

Sturrock faced the tough task of rebuilding the Southend side with only five first team players available for selection at one stage of pre-season, with only Anthony Grant, Matt Paterson and Scott Spencer surviving. He soon appointed new signing Craig Easton, who he had previously managed at Swindon Town, as captain while another player from one of Sturrock's old clubs, Chris Barker, was later appointed as vice-captain, having initially been signed on loan, and then permanently on deadline day. It was not an easy task for Sturrock as his assistant, Tommy Widdrington left for "footballing reasons" on Wednesday 15 December 2010. After a mid table finish in his first season, he enjoyed more success during the 2011–12 season where Southend led League Two for most of the campaign. Sturrock was named Manager of the Month for September 2011 by the Football League.

Sturrock was sacked as manager of Southend United on 24 March 2013 although it was agreed that he could lead out the players in the final of the Football League Trophy to be held at Wembley on 7 April. Sturrock declined the offer.

=== Yeovil Town ===
After a brief spell as an advisor to Conference Premier side Torquay United, he departed just four days after taking the job, after being appointed manager of Football League One side Yeovil Town on 9 April 2015, with the club all but relegated.

Following a poor start to the season, Yeovil announced on 1 December 2015 that they had parted company with Sturrock.

=== Post-retirement ===
Following his retirement from professional management, Sturrock returned to live in the South West of England. He remained involved in local football, being given an advisory role at non-League club Plymouth Parkway. He also writes a regular column for local newspaper, the Plymouth Evening Herald.

On 8 March 2018, Sturrock renewed his involvement with Dundee United when he was appointed as the club's chief scout in England. Later in March, Sturrock was added to the United coaching staff. He left United during the 2018–19 season.

== Career statistics ==
=== Club ===
Appearances and goals by club, season and competition
Club	Season	League			Scottish Cup		League Cup		Europe		Total	
Club	Season	Division	Apps	Goals	Apps	Goals	Apps	Goals	Apps	Goals	Apps	Goals
Dundee United	1974–75	Division One	12	6	–		–		1	0	13	6
Dundee United	1975–76	Premier Division	17	3	2	0	–		5	1	27	5
Dundee United	1976–77	Premier Division	36	15	1	1	5	1	–		42	17
Dundee United	1977–78	Premier Division	33	3	4	1	8	3	2	1	47	8
Dundee United	1978–79	Premier Division	33	6	1	0	2	1	2	0	38	7
Dundee United	1979–80	Premier Division	33	4	2	1	9	6	4	0	48	11
Dundee United	1980–81	Premier Division	35	13	7	1	11	9	4	0	57	23
Dundee United	1981–82	Premier Division	31	15	5	2	11	6	7	1	54	24
Dundee United	1982–83	Premier Division	28	8	1	0	9	7	7	1	45	16
Dundee United	1983–84	Premier Division	17	4	3	2	2	0	5	0	27	6
Dundee United	1984–85	Premier Division	30	14	6	2	6	2	6	2	48	20
Dundee United	1985–86	Premier Division	31	8	5	2	5	0	5	3	46	13
Dundee United	1986–87	Premier Division	30	6	6	0	3	0	11	0	50	6
Dundee United	1987–88	Premier Division	9	3	–		3	2	3	2	15	7
Dundee United	1988–89	Premier Division	9	1	5	0	–		–		14	1
Career total			384	109	48	12	79	38	60	11	571	170

=== International ===
Appearances and goals by national team and year
National team	Year	Apps	Goals
Scotland	1981	4	1
Scotland	1982	6	1
Scotland	1983	3	0
Scotland	1984	2	1
Scotland	1986	4	0
Scotland	1987	1	0
Total		20	3

Scores and results list Scotland's goal tally first, score column indicates score after each Sturrock goal.

List of international goals scored by Paul Sturrock
No.	Date	Venue	Opponent	Score	Result	Competition	Ref.
1	18 November 1981	Estadio da Luz, Lisbon	Portugal	1–0	1–2	1982 FIFA World Cup qualification	
2	13 October 1982	Hampden Park, Glasgow	East Germany	2–0	2–0	UEFA Euro 1984 qualifying	
3	12 September 1984	Hampden Park, Glasgow	Yugoslavia	4–1	6–1	Friendly match	

=== Managerial record ===
Research by football journalist Simon Kuper and football economist Stefan Szymanski found Sturrock to be among the highest performing managers in English football. The measure was based on game success after allowing for the clubs' wage bills.

As of 1 December 2015

Team	Nat	From	To	Record				
Team	Nat	From	To	G	W	D	L	Win %
St Johnstone	(Scotland)	1 August 1993	5 September 1998	197	90	56	51	45.69
Dundee United	(Scotland)	5 September 1998	7 August 2000	85	27	19	39	31.76
Plymouth Argyle	(England)	31 October 2000	4 March 2004	178	85	47	46	47.75
Southampton	(England)	4 March 2004	23 August 2004	13	5	2	6	38.46
Sheffield Wednesday	(England)	23 September 2004	19 October 2006	104	35	29	40	33.65
Swindon Town	(England)	7 November 2006	27 November 2007	52	26	11	15	50.00
Plymouth Argyle	(England)	27 November 2007	10 December 2009	99	28	22	49	28.28
Southend United	(England)	5 July 2010	24 March 2013	161	67	43	51	41.61
Yeovil Town	(England)	9 April 2015	1 December 2015	30	6	8	16	20.00
Total				919	369	237	313	40.15

== Honours ==
=== As a player ===
Dundee United

- Scottish Football League Premier Division: 1982–83
- Scottish League Cup: 1979–80, 1980–81; runner-up: 1981–82, 1984–85
- UEFA Cup runner-up: 1986–87
- Scottish Cup runner-up: 1980–81, 1984–85, 1986–87, 1987–88

Scotland

- The Rous Cup: 1985

=== As a manager ===
St Johnstone

- Scottish League First Division: 1996–97

Plymouth Argyle

- Football League Third Division: 2001–02
- Football League Second Division: 2003–04

Sheffield Wednesday

- Football League One play-offs: 2005

Swindon Town

- Football League Two promotion: 2006–07

Individual

- Football League Third Division Manager of the Year: 2001–02
- Football League Second Division Manager of the Year: 2003–04
- LMA Managers Performance League: January 2004

Awards

- Scottish Football Hall of Fame inductee: 2019

== Books ==
His autobiography was published in 2015, Luggy: The Autobiography of Paul Sturrock.

== See also ==
- List of Dundee United F.C. players
- List of one-club men in association football
- List of Scotland international footballers
