= Jack Harte =

Jack Harte may refer to:

- Jack Harte (writer), Irish short story writer and novelist
- Jack Harte (politician) (1920–2015), Irish Labour party politician and senator

== See also ==
- John Harte (disambiguation)
- Jack Hart (disambiguation)
