= Jerry Kerr =

Scottish footballer and manager

Personal information
- Full name: John Kerr
- Date of birth: 1 June 1912
- Place of birth: Armadale, Scotland
- Date of death: 8 November 1999 (aged 87)
- Place of death: Dundee, Scotland
- Position: Left-back

Senior career*
Years	Team	Apps	(Gls)
- Armadale Thistle
- Motherwell
–1937	Alloa		
1937–1939	St Bernard's		
1939–1947	Dundee United		
- Rangers
- Berwick Rangers

Managerial career
- Peebles Rovers
- 1953–1954: Berwick Rangers
- 1955–1959: Alloa
- 1959–1971: Dundee United
- 1967: Dallas Tornado
- 1974–1976: Forfar Athletic
- * Club domestic league appearances and goals

John "Jerry" Kerr (1 June 1912 – 8 November 1999) was a Scottish football player and manager, best known as manager of Dundee United from 1959 to 1971. He is credited with taking the club from third bottom of the Scottish League to being an established side in the Scottish top tier. He became the first manager of a British club to win a competitive game in Spain when United won home and away against F.C. Barcelona in the 1966-67 Inter-Cities Fairs Cup.

== Playing career ==
A native of West Lothian, Kerr enjoyed a lengthy playing career as a full-back, predominantly as a part-timer or amateur.

=== Armadale Thistle and Rangers ===
From the age of 15, he played for his native Armadale Thistle. He joined Rangers at the age of 17 but played just one game for the Ibrox club.

=== Motherwell and Alloa Athletic ===
Kerr's senior playing career began at Armadale Thistle before he joined Motherwell and later Alloa Athletic.

=== St Bernard's ===
His next club was St Bernard's in 1937. He captained the Edinburgh side to the Scottish Cup semi-finals in his first season at the Gymnasium, where they eventually lost to fellow Second Division side East Fife in a second replay.

=== Dundee United ===
Kerr became one of new Dundee United manager Bobby McKay's first signings during the close season of 1939 and again was made club captain but only four League matches of season 1939–40 were played before the competition was abandoned. Kerr was one of only three players who remained with United after the outbreak of war, and played as his team progressed to the final of the Emergency War Cup (effectively the Scottish Cup, but with relaxed registration rules due to the Second World War). He was, however, unlucky to sustain a shoulder injury in the semi-final which kept him out of the final against Rangers, at Hampden.

=== Rangers ===
Kerr spent two years with Rangers after the war before moving towards a coaching career.

== Managerial career ==
=== Peebles Rovers and Berwick Rangers ===
It was in the field of football management where Kerr's true strengths began to emerge. His first post was as player/manager with the East of Scotland League club Peebles Rovers, followed by a spell at Berwick Rangers.

=== Alloa Athletic ===
Kerr was appointed manager of Alloa Athletic in 1955, a club where he had spent time as a player. He became known as having an eye for a good player, also having a theory that the bigger the club, the worse the talent-spotting. When at Alloa he assembled a partnership of inside forwards Dennis Gillespie (who he would later take to Tannadice) and John White. Two years later Kerr sold White to Falkirk. Tottenham Hotspur a year later spent £20,000 to lure White to North London.

=== Dundee United ===
In 1959 United manager Andy McCall (their fifth in less than five years), resigned after leading the part-time club to third bottom place in Division Two. Kerr was the man given the task of reviving the club in April that year.

Kerr's first policy upon joining United was his insistence that his players be full-time, a gamble that could have cost the club dearly. He also insisted that there had to be a properly constituted reserve side and an end to the previous policy of buying in over-the-hill First Division players. Ron Yeats' career took an upward turn from Kerr's appointment. Kerr regarded Yeats as so vital to the fortunes of the team he sought his release to play each Saturday from the military authorities while Yeats served his National Service. In Kerr's 1959–60 first full season in charge, St Johnstone finished as champions. United's challengers for the second promotion spot were Hamilton Academical and Queen of the South. Hamilton were beaten 5–1 at Tannadice with seven games to go before a crowd of over 11,000 putting Accies firmly in United's rear view. United went to Palmerston Park to play the Ivor Broadis inspired Queen of the South with three games to go. United returned home with a 4–4 draw to maintain their one-point advantage over QoS. Promotion was clinched with a last game of the season 1–0 home win against Berwick Rangers before a crowd of near 17,000. This brought First Division football to Tannadice for the first time since they had been relegated in 1932.

In the following 1960–61 season United retained their top division place. Other players were to flourish; like defensive giant Yeats were the forward pair of Gillespie (whom Kerr had brought with him from Alloa Athletic) and Jim Irvine scoring 21 and 23 goals respectively. United finished ninth.

With Hal Stewart of Morton, he was one of first to see the possibility of tapping Scandinavia for players at an affordable price. And by 1964, Lennart Wing, Finn Døssing, Mogens Berg and Örjan Persson had joined the club.

Kerr is also credited with another landmark moment in the club's history, as he led United into their first ever European tie in 1966. This produced a 4–1 aggregate victory over FC Barcelona in the Fairs Cup that included a 2–1 win at the Nou Camp.

In November 1971 (then aged 59) he assumed the post of general manager. Jim McLean took over as manager of football matters to build upon Kerr's successful base over the following seasons. Kerr then left the club, with the minimum of publicity, at the end of season 1972–73. Kerr is remembered for taking United from third from the bottom in Scottish League Football to a secure place in the top division.

More than thirty years later the Club recognised the contribution Kerr had made, when they renamed the south stand the Jerry Kerr Stand.

=== Forfar Athletic ===
Kerr later managed Forfar Athletic from 1974 to 1976 before retiring from football completely.

== Honours ==
Alloa Athletic

- Stirlingshire Cup: 1955–56, 1957–58

Dundee United

- Scottish Second Division promotion: 1959-60
- Forfarshire Cup: 1960–61, 1962–63, 1963–64, 1964–65, 1967–68, 1968–69
