= Kevin Summerfield =

Professional footballer, coach

Personal information
- Date of birth: 7 January 1959 (age 67)
- Place of birth: Walsall, England
- Height: 5 ft 11 in (1.80 m)
- Positions: Midfielder; forward

Youth career
- 1975–1977: West Bromwich Albion

Senior career*
Years	Team	Apps	(Gls)
1977–1982	West Bromwich Albion	9	(4)
1982–1983	Birmingham City	5	(1)
1983–1984	Walsall	54	(17)
1984	Cardiff City	10	(1)
1984–1990	Plymouth Argyle	139	(26)
1990	→ Exeter City	4	(0)
1990–1996	Shrewsbury Town	163	(21)
Total		384	(70)

International career
1976–1977	England Youth	6	(2)
- * Club domestic league appearances and goals

Kevin Summerfield (born 7 January 1959) is an English football coach and retired player.

He began his career with West Bromwich Albion as a forward, making his first team debut in 1977, before joining Birmingham City five years later. A few months later, he signed for his hometown club Walsall and enjoyed a successful 18 months there, scoring 17 league goals, which led to a transfer to Cardiff City in 1984. He was signed by Dave Smith for Plymouth Argyle six months later, where was converted into a midfielder, and was an important member of the squad for the next five years. A broken leg sustained in January 1989 led to a year on the sidelines, and after regaining full fitness he spent time on loan with Exeter City. He ended his playing career with Shrewsbury Town.

He returned to Plymouth Argyle in 1997 as the club's youth team coach, and was appointed caretaker manager three years later. He became the club's assistant manager after the arrival of Paul Sturrock and led the club to the brink of promotion to the Football League Championship before joining Sturrock at Southampton. He gained promotion two more times with Sturrock, at Sheffield Wednesday in 2005, and Swindon Town in 2007, before returning to Plymouth Argyle once again. He then spent two years as assistant manager at Tranmere Rovers, before moving to Burton Albion to take up the same role. In October 2014, he followed Burton manager Gary Rowett to Birmingham City, again as assistant manager, where they remained for two years, and in March 2017 joined Derby County, again as assistant to Rowett.

== Playing career ==
Born in Walsall, Summerfield started his career as an apprentice with West Bromwich Albion in 1975. During his time at The Hawthorns he played for the England youth team on six occasions. After more than five years as a professional at the club he moved on to Birmingham City, followed by a successful spell with hometown club Walsall. A short stay with Cardiff City followed, before he joined Plymouth Argyle, He spent time on loan at Exeter City in 1990 and ended his playing career Shrewsbury Town where he was player-coach.

== Coaching career ==
Summerfield took charge of the Shrews' youth team before becoming a coach at Plymouth Argyle under manager Kevin Hodges the following year. After Hodges was sacked in 2000, Summerfield took over as caretaker manager for five matches until the appointment of Paul Sturrock as permanent manager. He again took over as Argyle's caretaker manager when Paul Sturrock left to become manager of Southampton. This time he was in charge for nine matches before following Sturrock to Southampton as his assistant and later again to Sheffield Wednesday, and Swindon Town.

During his first spell as Sturrock's assistant at Home Park, he won the Third Division title in the 2001–02 season and to the brink of winning the Second Division title in the 2003–04 season, before moving to Southampton. His and Sturrock's success continued at Hillsborough when they achieved promotion to the Championship in their first season with Sheffield Wednesday, and also at Swindon Town, where the team was promoted to League One in their year in charge. He returned to Plymouth Argyle once more as assistant manager when Sturrock was reappointed as the club's manager in November 2007. Summerfield left the club in October 2009, along with fellow coach John Blackley, after being informed that their contracts would not be renewed at the end of the season. He was replaced by former player Paul Mariner, who assumed the role of head coach.

He joined Tranmere Rovers in July 2010 as assistant manager to Les Parry.

On 18 May 2012, Summerfield was announced as assistant manager to Gary Rowett at Burton Albion. In October 2014, Summerfield followed Rowett to Birmingham City, again as his assistant. Rowett and his staff, Summerfield included, were sacked in December 2016. On 14 March 2017, Summerfield again followed Rowett, this time to Derby County where he again became assistant manager.

== Personal life ==
His son Luke also became a professional footballer.

== Honours ==
Shrewsbury Town

- Football League Third Division: 1993–94
