= Eden Brewery, Penrith =

Independent brewery in Penrith, Cumbria, England

Eden Brewery is an English independent brewery based in Penrith, Cumbria, England. The brewery was established in October 2011 in the former kitchens of Brougham Hall and began production in March 2012.

In May 2018 the brewery rebranded as Eden River Brew Co. In February 2019 it was sold to Eden Mill St Andrews.

It produces a range of 500ml bottled traditional English ales, as well as more experimental 330ml and 440ml cans.
