= John Harte =

John Harte may refer to:

- John Harte (mayor) (died 1604), Lord Mayor of London for 1589
- John Harte (scientist) (born 1939), American ecologist

== See also ==
- Jack Harte (disambiguation)
- John Hart (disambiguation)
