= Dundy =

Dundy may refer to:

- Dundy County, Nebraska
- Elmer Scipio Dundy (1830–1896), American Judge and namesake of Dundy County, Nebraska
- Elmer "Skip" Dundy (1862–1907), son of Elmer Scipio Dundy and showman
- Elaine Dundy (1921–2008), American novelist, actress and playwright

== See also ==
- Dundee (disambiguation)
