= Frank Quinn (footballer, born 1926) =

Scottish footballer (1926–2008)

Personal information
- Date of birth: 12 September 1926
- Place of birth: Saltcoats, Scotland
- Date of death: 18 October 2008 (aged 82)
- Place of death: Saltcoats, Scotland
- Height: 5 ft 10 in (1.78 m)
- Position: Outside right

Senior career*
Years	Team	Apps	(Gls)
- Saltcoats Victoria
1946–1948	Celtic	6	(2)
1948–1954	Dundee United	157	(90)
1954–1955	Hamilton Academical	25	(15)
1955–1957	Cowdenbeath	63	(38)
1957–1958	Stranraer	9	(7)
Total		260	(152)
- * Club domestic league appearances and goals

Francis Quinn (12 September 1926 – 18 October 2008) was a Scottish professional footballer who played as an outside right for Celtic, Dundee United, Hamilton Academical, Cowdenbeath and Stranraer.

Born in Saltcoats, Ayrshire, Quinn played for local junior club Saltcoats Victoria before turning senior with Celtic in November 1946. Having failed to become a first team regular, he was released in 1948, joining Dundee United on a free transfer on 18 August 1948. He scored a hat trick for the reserve team on the same day. After making his first team debut against Alloa Athletic on 1 September, he quickly established himself, becoming part of a celebrated forward line known as the "Famous Five". Despite playing on the wing he was also a regular goalscorer, scoring over twenty goals in each of four consecutive seasons and finishing as United's leading scorer in the 1952-53 season. He was released by the club in May 1954, subsequently signing for Hamilton.

Quinn died in Saltcoats in 2008. He was posthumously inducted into the Dundee United Hall of Fame in 2016.
