= Dundee, Virginia =

Unincorporated community in Virginia, US

Coordinates: 36.59153°N 79.37586°W

Dundee is an unincorporated community in Pittsylvania County, in the U.S. state of Virginia.
