= Tommy Neilson =

Scottish footballer

Personal information
- Full name: Thomas Murphy Neilson
- Date of birth: 15 March 1935
- Place of birth: Gorebridge, Scotland
- Date of death: 10 February 2018 (aged 82)
- Place of death: South Africa
- Position: Wing half

Senior career*
| Years | Team | Apps | (Gls) |
- Arniston Rangers
| 1953–1957 | Heart of Midlothian | 0 | (0) |
| 1957–1959 | East Fife | 53 | (4) |
| 1959–1968 | Dundee United | 235 | (9) |
| 1967 | → Dallas Tornado (loan) | 11 | (0) |
| 1968–1969 | Cowdenbeath | 30 | (2) |
- * Club domestic league appearances and goals

Thomas Neilson (15 March 1935 – 10 February 2018) was a Scottish footballer who played wing-half. Neilson played for East Fife, Dundee United and – briefly – Cowdenbeath. He emigrated to South Africa in 1970 and died there in February 2018.
