= Dundee (ship) =

1808 ship wrecked in Australia

History
- Name: Dundee
- Fate: Wrecked August 1808

Dundee was a ship wrecked in 1808 off the coast of New South Wales, Australia.

== History ==
Dundee left Sydney for Fiji to obtain Sandalwood to take to China in August 1808. As it sailed past the entrance to the Hunter River the ship encountered a heavy gale and foundered on the sandbars at the mouth of the river. Shortly after the ship broke up drowning two Lascars. The remaining crew made it to shore, although the chief mate gave up swimming in a state of exhaustion and was only rescued when other sailors went back into the surf to rescue him.
