= Dundee (slang) =

Nigerian slang

Dundee United is a colloquial Nigerian insult used to describe someone as an idiot or stupid. The phrase originated from the Scottish football club Dundee United's tour of Nigeria in 1972.

== Origin ==
There are several possible explanations, including the 1989 FIFA Under-16 World Championships where four games were played in the rivalling Dens Park stadium, and the 1983-84 European Cup semi-final tie, which Dundee United controversially lost to Roma despite winning by two goals in the first leg. Alternatively, it could be onomatopoeic, as a drum in Yoruba is "dundun"; this could be a contributing reason. The term dates back at least to the late 1980s in advertising.

The likeliest reason is their two-week tour in May–June 1972, where Dundee United played several matches against local (sometimes amateur) Nigerian teams, suffering notable defeats — including a 4–1 loss to Stationery Stores and a 2–0 loss to Enugu Rangers. Jim McLean, the then-new manager of Dundee United, blamed heat, injuries, and the condition of the pitches.

These unexpected results led to widespread ridicule, and the team's name became synonymous with poor performance and ineptitude. Over time, Nigerians began using "Dundee United" as an insult to mock someone perceived as acting foolishly or making avoidable mistakes. It became known to the world during a BBC documentary "Welcome to Lagos".

== Evolution ==
The phrase later evolved into a shorter form, with "Dundee" alone sometimes used to convey the same meaning. In certain contexts, "Dundee United" is reserved for describing a group behaving foolishly, while "Dundee" targets an individual.

It has been posited that due to the large disparity in population between Nigeria and Scotland, more people know "Dundee United" to mean a fool than know that it's a real football team.
