= Dundee (surname) =

Dundee is a surname. Notable people with the surname include:

- Angelo Dundee (1921–2012), American boxing trainer
- Bill Dundee (1943–2026), ring name of Scottish–Australian professional wrestler William Cruickshanks
- Jamie Dundee (born 1971), a ring name of James Cruickshanks, Australia-born American professional wrestler and son of Bill Dundee best known as J. C. Ice
- Joe Dundee (1903–1982), Italian American boxer
- John Dundee (1921–1991), Northern Irish medical anesthesiologist
- Johnny Dundee (1893–1965), Italian American boxer
- Sean Dundee (born 1972), South African/German footballer
- Vince Dundee (1907–1949), Italian American boxer

== Fictional ==
- Michael "Crocodile" Dundee (also called Mick), played by Paul Hogan, is an Australian fictional character, the protagonist in the Crocodile Dundee film series.
