= Dundee High School =

Dundee High School may refer to:

- High School of Dundee, Dundee, Scotland
- Dundee High School (Michigan), Dundee, Michigan, USA
- Dundee-Crown High School, Carpentersville, Illinois, USA
- Dundee Junior - Senior High School, Dundee, New York, USA
