= Stewart Fraser (footballer) =

Scottish footballer

Personal information
- Full name: James Stewart Fraser
- Date of birth: 25 September 1936 (age 90)
- Place of birth: Aberdeen, Scotland
- Position: Left half

Youth career
- Banks o' Dee

Senior career*
Years	Team	Apps	(Gls)
1957–1967	Dundee United	193	(11)

International career
1962	Scottish Football League XI	2	(3)
- * Club domestic league appearances and goals

James Stewart Fraser (born 1936 in Aberdeen) is a Scottish former footballer who played as a left half. Fraser spent his entire senior career with Dundee United, making nearly 200 appearances in a ten-year spell before a broken leg halted his United career. He represented the Scottish Football League XI twice in 1962, scoring a hat-trick against the League of Ireland XI in an 11–0 win.

When he left Dundee United, Fraser signed as player manager with Brora Rangers FC in the Scottish Highland Football League, where he remained for several seasons.
