= Duncan Hutchison =

Scottish footballer

Personal information
- Date of birth: 3 March 1904
- Place of birth: Kelty, Scotland
- Date of death: 1973 (aged 68–69)
- Position: Forward

Senior career*
Years	Team	Apps	(Gls)
- Dunfermline Athletic
1927–1929	Dundee United		
1929–1931	Newcastle United		
- Derby County
- Hull City
1935–1939	Dundee United		

Managerial career
- 1954: Dundee United (caretaker)
- * Club domestic league appearances and goals

Duncan Hutchison (3 March 1904 – 1973) was a Scottish footballer. Nicknamed "Hurricane Hutch", he played as a forward for Dunfermline Athletic, Dundee United, Newcastle United, Derby County and Hull City.

Born in Kelty, Fife, Hutchison began his senior career with Dunfermline. He was released after breaking a leg and joined Dundee United in July 1927. After a debut goal against Bathgate on 13 August 1927, he went on to become United's top scorer in 1927-28, with a total of 32 league and cup goals, including two hat-tricks. In the following season, he was once again United's top scorer with 35 goals, helping the club to the Division Two title and promotion. He scored four goals in one match against Albion Rovers, as well as two more hat-tricks. Hutchison's goalscoring led to speculation regarding transfers to other clubs, and a bid for his services from Liverpool was rejected.

After only three matches of the 1929-30 season, however, Hutchison was unexpectedly sold to Newcastle United for a fee of about £4,000, leading to vociferous protests from Dundee United supporters. Without him, the club were relegated at the end of the season.

After two years at Newcastle, Hutchison had spells with Derby County and Hull City before rejoining Dundee United in June 1935. Arthur Milne was now United's established centre forward, so Hutchison now took on the role of a supporting forward, although he continued to score regularly. His brother Dan was a teammate during this time.

Hutchison continued to play for Dundee United up until retiring at the outbreak of the Second World War in 1939. He became a publican, running the United Bar in Dundee, and became a director of Dundee United in 1953. After the resignation of manager Willie MacFadyen in August 1954, Hutchison took over on a temporary basis for six matches until the appointment of Reggie Smith. He remained as a director until his death in 1973, also having a brief spell as club chairman in 1963. In January 2011, Hutchison was posthumously inducted into the Dundee United Hall of Fame.
