= Alex Arnold (footballer) =

Scottish footballer (1928–2017)

Personal information
- Full name: Alexander Wilson Arnold
- Date of birth: 1 May 1928
- Place of birth: Edinburgh, Scotland
- Date of death: 2017 (aged 89)
- Place of death: Kirkcaldy, Scotland
- Position: Defender

Senior career*
Years	Team	Apps	(Gls)
1952–1957	Dundee United	110	(0)
1957	Stirling Albion	1	(0)
1957–1958	Berwick Rangers	17	(0)
- * Club domestic league appearances and goals

Alexander Wilson Arnold (1 May 1928 – 2017) was a Scottish footballer who played as a defender. Arnold began his senior career in the early 1950s with Dundee United, having previously played with Dundonald Bluebell. Featuring in over 100 league matches for The Terrors, Arnold went on to play for Stirling Albion and Berwick Rangers after leaving Tannadice. Arnold died in Kirkcaldy in 2017, at the age of 89.
