= John Hart =

John Hart or Johnny Hart may refer to:

== Arts and entertainment ==
- John Hart (actor) (1917–2009), American actor
- John Hart (dancer) (1921–2015), English ballet dancer, choreographer and artistic director
- Johnny Hart (1931–2007), American cartoonist
- John Hart (author) (born 1965), American novelist
- Jonn Hart (born 1989), American R&B singer
- John Hart (producer), American film and theater producer

== Fictional ==
- Captain John Hart (Torchwood), fictional character on Torchwood

== Military ==
- John Hart (soldier) (1706–1777), American soldier
- John E. Hart (1824–1863), American naval officer during the Civil War
- John W. Hart (1833–1907), American Civil War soldier and Medal of Honor recipient
- John Hart (RAF officer) (1916–2019), Canadian pilot in the Royal Air Force

== Politics ==
- John Hart (colonial administrator) (flourished 1714–1720), royal governor of Maryland and later the Leeward Islands
- John Hart (New Jersey politician) (c. 1711–1779), delegate from New Jersey to the Continental Congress and a signer of the United States Declaration of Independence
- John Hart (doctor) (1751–1836), American surgeon and politician
- John Hart (South Australian colonist) (1809–1873), "Capt. John Hart", sailor, mill-owner and politician
- John Hart (Tasmanian politician) (1829–1896), member of the Tasmanian House of Assembly
- John Shadrach Hart (1838–1912), New South Wales politician
- John Hart Jr. (1848–1881), member of the South Australian House of Assembly
- John M. Hart (1866–1955), American politician
- John Hart (Canadian politician) (1879–1957), premier of British Columbia in 1940s
- Jack Hart (state senator) (John A. Hart, Jr., born 1961), Democratic member of the Massachusetts State Senate
- John Hart Ely (1938–2003), American legal scholar
- John Hart, aka James L. Hart (born 1944), US congressional candidate in 2004 and 2006

== Religion ==
- John Hart (Jesuit) (died 1586), English priest
- John Stephen Hart (bishop) (1866–1952), bishop in the Anglican Church of Australia

== Sports ==
- Johnny Hart (Australian footballer) (1888–1966), Australian footballer for Essendon
- Les Hart (John Leslie Hart, 1917-1996), English footballer
- John Hart (rugby union, born 1928) (1928–2007), Scottish rugby union player
- Johnny Hart (English footballer) (1928–2018), English footballer and manager
- John Hart (speedway rider) (born 1941), English speedway rider
- John Hart (rugby union coach) (born 1945), New Zealand rugby union coach
- John Hart (baseball) (born 1948), American baseball vice-president and general manager
- John Hart (rugby union, born 1982), British rugby player
- Johnny Hart (Scottish footballer), Scottish footballer and coach

== Other ==
- John Hart (spelling reformer) (died 1574), English grammarian and officer of arms
- John Seely Hart (1810–1877), American author and educator
- John Hart (journalist) (born 1932), American journalist
- John Hart (classicist) (1936–2011), first male winner of UK Mastermind
- John P. Hart (born 1960), American activist
- John Fraser Hart (1924–2024), American geographer

== See also ==
- John Harte (disambiguation)
- John De Hart (1727–1795), American lawyer, jurist, statesman, Continental Congress delegate
- John O'Hart (1824–1902), Irish genealogist
