= Johnny Hart (Scottish footballer) =

Scottish footballer and coach

Personal information
- Full name: Johnny Hart
- Place of birth: Scotland
- Position: Forward

Senior career*
Years	Team	Apps	(Gls)
- Albion Rovers F.C.
- Motherwell F.C.
- St Johnstone F.C.
1926–1930	Dundee United F.C.		
1930–	Ross County F.C.		

Managerial career
- 1930–: Ross County F.C. (player-coach)
- 1932–1937: Dundee United F.C. (trainer)
- 1946–1953: Dundee United F.C. (trainer)
- * Club domestic league appearances and goals

Johnny Hart was a Scottish footballer and coach who played as a forward. He played for Albion Rovers, Motherwell and St Johnstone before joining Dundee United in June 1926. The club were relegated in his first season, but he helped them to promotion in 1929. Hart was released in 1930 and joined Ross County in the Highland Football League as a player-coach. He applied unsuccessfully for the Dundee United manager's job in May 1931, but rejoined the club as team trainer in July 1932. He left in 1937, but later returned in the same role between 1946 and 1953, and thereafter continued his association with the club as a scout. He was inducted into the Dundee United Hall of Fame in 2013.
