= Smögens IF =

Swedish football club

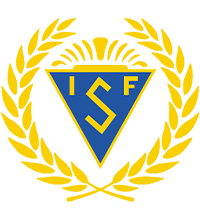
- Full name: Smögens IF
- Founded: 1913
- Ground: Havsvallen; Smögen; Sweden
Home colours

Smögens IF is a Swedish football club located in Smögen. It was founded in 1913 and plays its home games at Havsvallen. It currently plays in the seventh tier of Swedish football.

== Season to season ==
Season	Level	Division	Section	Position	Movements
1959	Tier 4	Division 4	Bohuslän/Dalsland	3rd	
1960	Tier 4	Division 4	Bohuslän/Dalsland	4th	
1961	Tier 4	Division 4	Bohuslän/Dalsland	9th	Relegated
1962	Tier 5	Division 5	Bohuslän	5th	
1963	Tier 5	Division 5	Bohuslän	2nd	
1964	Tier 5	Division 5	Bohuslän	3rd	
1965	Tier 5	Division 5	Bohuslän	5th	
1966	Tier 5	Division 5	Bohuslän	6th	
1967	Tier 5	Division 5	Bohuslän	2nd	Promoted
1968	Tier 4	Division 4	Bohuslän/Dalsland	11th	Relegated
1969	Tier 5	Division 5	Bohuslän	1st	Promoted
1970	Tier 4	Division 4	Bohuslän/Dalsland	3rd	
1971	Tier 4	Division 4	Bohuslän/Dalsland	12th	Relegated
1972	Tier 5	Division 5	Bohuslän	3rd	
1973	Tier 5	Division 5	Bohuslän	1st	Promoted
1974	Tier 4	Division 4	Bohuslän/Dalsland	7th	
1975	Tier 4	Division 4	Bohuslän/Dalsland	6th	
1976	Tier 4	Division 4	Bohuslän/Dalsland	4th	
1977	Tier 4	Division 4	Bohuslän/Dalsland	9th	
1978	Tier 4	Division 4	Bohuslän/Dalsland	12th	Relegated
1979	Tier 5	Division 5	Bohuslän	6th	
1980	Tier 5	Division 5	Bohuslän	8th	
1981	Tier 5	Division 5	Bohuslän	2nd	
1982	Tier 5	Division 5	Bohuslän Norra	4th	
1983	Tier 5	Division 5	Bohuslän Norra	6th	
1984	Tier 5	Division 5	Bohuslän Norra	11th	Relegated
1985	Tier 6	Division 6	Bohuslän Norra	3rd	
1986	Tier 6	Division 6	Bohuslän Norra	2nd	Promoted
1987	Tier 6	Division 5	Bohuslän Norra	7th	
1988	Tier 6	Division 5	Bohuslän Norra	7th	
1989	Tier 6	Division 5	Bohuslän Norra	7th	
1990	Tier 6	Division 5	Bohuslän	7th	
1991	Tier 6	Division 5	Bohuslän	6th	
1992	Tier 6	Division 5	Bohuslän	3rd	Promoted
1993	Tier 5	Division 4	Bohuslän/Dalsland	10th	Relegated
1994	Tier 6	Division 5	Bohuslän	12th	Relegated
1995	Tier 7	Division 6	Bohuslän	5th	
1996	Tier 7	Division 6	Bohuslän	3rd	
1997	Tier 7	Division 6	Bohuslän	5th	
1998	Tier 7	Division 6	Bohuslän	1st	Promoted
1999	Tier 6	Division 5	Bohuslän	7th	
2000	Tier 6	Division 5	Bohuslän	8th	
2001	Tier 6	Division 5	Bohuslän	8th	
2002	Tier 6	Division 5	Bohuslän	3rd	
2003	Tier 6	Division 5	Bohuslän	5th	
2004	Tier 6	Division 5	Bohuslän	12th	Relegated
2005	Tier 7	Division 6	Bohuslän	3rd	Promoted
2006	Tier 7	Division 5	Bohuslän	8th	
2007	Tier 7	Division 5	Bohuslän	7th	
2008	Tier 7	Division 5	Bohuslän	2nd	Promoted
2009	Tier 6	Division 4	Bohuslän/Dalsland	10th	Relegated
2010	Tier 7	Division 5	Bohuslän	8th	
2011	Tier 7	Division 5	Bohuslän	4th	
2012	Tier 7	Division 5	Bohuslän	9th	
2013	Club played as Smögen KIF due to partnership with Kungshamns IF				
2014	Club played as Smögen KIF due to partnership with Kungshamns IF				
2015	Tier 9	Division 7	Bohuslän	2nd	Promoted
2016	Tier 8	Division 6	Bohuslän norra	3rd	
2017	Tier 8	Division 6	Bohuslän norra	4th	
2018	Tier 8	Division 6	Bohuslän norra	2nd	Promoted
2019	Tier 7	Division 5	Bohuslän	6th	
2020	Tier 7	Division 5	Bohuslän	8th	
2021	Tier 7	Division 5	Bohuslän	2nd	Promoted
2022	Tier 6	Division 4	Bohuslän/Dalsland	12th	Relegated
2023	Tier 7	Division 5	Bohuslän	5th	
2024	Tier 7	Division 5	Bohuslän	5th	
2025	Tier 7	Division 5	Bohuslän/Dalsland södra		
