= Dundee United F.C. =

Association football club in Dundee, Scotland

Dundee United
- Full name: Dundee United Football Club
- Nicknames: The Terrors; The Tangerines
- Founded: 24 May 1909; 117 years ago (as Dundee Hibernian)
- Ground: Tannadice Park
- Capacity: 14,223
- Coordinates: 56°28′29″N 2°58′8″W
- Chairman: Mark Ogren
- Manager: Jim Goodwin
- League: Scottish Premiership
- 2025–26: Scottish Premiership, 7th of 12
- Website: www.dundeeunitedfc.co.uk
Home colours	Away colours

Dundee United Football Club is a Scottish professional football club based in the city of Dundee. Formed in 1909, originally as Dundee Hibernian, the club changed to the present name in 1923. United are nicknamed The Terrors or The Tangerines and the supporters are known as Arabs. They currently play in the Scottish Premiership.

The club have played in tangerine shirts mostly accompanied by black shorts since August 1969, and have played at Tannadice Park since the club's foundation in 1909. United was a founding member of the Scottish Premier League (SPL) in 1998, and was ever-present in the competition until it was abolished in 2013 to make way for the SPFL structure. In the last decade United's top flight status has wavered somewhat, having suffered two relegations. They bounced back at the first time of asking on the most recent occasion, winning the 2023–24 Scottish Championship and returning to the top flight impressively in the 2024–25 Scottish Premiership season, finishing 4th and securing European qualification.

Domestically, the club has won the Scottish Premier Division on one occasion (1982–83), the Scottish Cup twice (1994 and 2010) and the Scottish League Cup twice (1979 and 1980). United appeared in European competition for the first time in the 1966–67 season, going on to appear in Europe in 14 successive seasons from 1976. They also reached the European Cup semi-finals in 1983–84 and the UEFA Cup final in 1987.

The club contest the Dundee derby with local rivals Dundee; this is the geographically closest derby in Britain, as Dens Park stadium is located virtually next door to Tannadice Park. United have won the local derby on the most occasions.

== History ==
Chart of historic performance of Dundee United in the League.

=== Beginning (1909–1959) ===
The club was formed as Dundee Hibernian in 1909, playing from the outset at Tannadice Park (previously known as Clepington Park), named after the street it's located on - Tannadice Street. They were voted into the Scottish Football League in 1910. After being saved from going out of business in October 1923, the club changed their name to Dundee United in order to widen their appeal. Between 1925 and 1932 United were promoted and relegated between the first and second tier three times, winning the Second Division title in 1925 and 1929.

=== Promotion to the top flight (1959–1971) ===
The club took significant strides forward when Jerry Kerr became manager in 1959. Kerr's team won promotion in his first season in charge and became an established team in the top flight, where they remained until 1995.

A key characteristic of Kerr's reign was the strengthening of the playing squad with Scandinavian imports, most notably with the signings of Lennart Wing, Finn Dossing, Mogens Berg, Finn Seemann and Orjan Persson.

It was during this period that United qualified for European competition for the first time, eliminating Inter-Cities Fairs Cup holders Barcelona on their European debut in 1966.

=== Jim McLean era (1971–1993) ===
Jim McLean took over from Kerr in 1971 and under his management the club enjoyed the most successful era in its history. McLean's era became known for his youth policy and the offering of long-term contracts that would see future Scotland international players such as Dave Narey, Paul Sturrock, Paul Hegarty, Davie Dodds, Eamonn Bannon and Maurice Malpas spend the majority of their careers at the club.

United won their first major honour under McLean, capturing the Scottish League Cup in 1979 and again in 1980. They were crowned Premier Division champions in 1982–83.

The club were also successful in Europe, reaching the European Cup semi-finals in 1984 and the UEFA Cup final in 1987, the latter campaign involving another elimination of Barcelona during the earlier rounds (maintaining a 100% record over the Spaniards in competitive European ties). Despite losing to IFK Gothenburg in the final, the club was awarded a FIFA Fair Play Award.

McLean retired as manager in 1993, but remained as club chairman.

=== Scottish Cup wins and relegation (1993–2016) ===
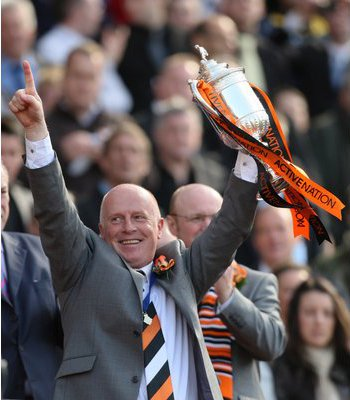
Manager Peter Houston celebrating Dundee United's 2010 Scottish Cup final win

United won the Scottish Cup for the first time in 1994 under McLean's successor Ivan Golac, but were relegated in 1995, before returning to the Premier Division a year later.

Following a number of board changes, the club was purchased from McLean in 2002 by former Morning Noon and Night co-founder and chief executive Eddie Thompson. A lifelong United fan, Thompson invested heavily in the team in a bid to compete with significant spending which had developed following the formation of the Scottish Premier League, however little progress was made until Craig Levein became manager in 2006. Levein established United as a top six club, regularly achieving European qualification before he left the club to take the post as Scotland men's national team manager in 2009.

With the foundations of the side in place, United won the Scottish Cup for a second time in 2010 under the management of Peter Houston.

After several relatively successful seasons, a series of poor results in the Premiership led to United being relegated in 2016.

=== Scottish Championship and promotion battles (2016–2020) ===
Dundee United's first season in the Championship was under the management of Ray McKinnon. United won the Challenge Cup by beating St Mirren 2–1 in the final and they reached the play-off final for the Premiership, losing narrowly 1–0 to Hamilton. The second season in the second tier was less successful, as manager McKinnon was sacked and replaced with Csaba László; after a very disappointing season, United lost in the play-off semi-final to eventual promotion winners Livingston. After a poor start to the 2018–19 season the manager was once again sacked and replaced with Robbie Neilson. The team finished second in the Championship but lost in the play-offs to St Mirren, missing four penalty kicks in the process. United started the 2019–20 season in title winning form, maintaining the top spot since the opening weekend, but the season was postponed due to the global COVID-19 pandemic on 13 March 2020. On 15 April 2020, the SPFL plan proposing an end to the season was approved. A 14-point lead over second place Inverness CT saw United crowned champions and subsequently promoted back to the Premiership. On 21 June 2020, the club announced that they were parting ways with manager Robbie Neilson, who agreed a deal to return to newly relegated side Heart of Midlothian.

=== Scottish Premiership return (2020–2023) ===
Prior to the start of the Premiership season, Dundee United hired Tranmere Rovers manager Micky Mellon to replace Neilson, and began their campaign at home to Tayside rivals St Johnstone, drawing 1–1. In their first season back in the top flight United finished in 9th place, whilst also making a Scottish Cup semi-final appearance, losing to Hibernian.

In May 2021 Mellon departed the club, being replaced on 7 June by Tam Courts. Courts first season as Dundee United manager saw the team finish 4th, their highest position since 2014, and qualify to play in the third qualification round of the 2022–23 UEFA Europa Conference League.

United were eliminated in the third qualification round by AZ Alkmaar after a 7–1 aggregate defeat, losing 7–0 away from home, equaling the record defeat for a Scottish club in European competition. They started the league season equally poorly, and were beaten 9–0 at home by Celtic on 28 August 2022. United continued to play poorly throughout the season, leading to the departure of two managers as the club faced an unexpected relegation battle. The first was Jack Ross, who was appointed as manager before the season; he was sacked after the 9–0 loss to Celtic. Ross was succeeded by Liam Fox, first on an interim basis and then as full-time head coach after a win against Livingston in the League Cup. Fox was in charge of the club until February where a 4–0 defeat against fellow relegation rivals Ross County resulted in the second managerial departure in the same season. The club turned to Jim Goodwin, who had himself been relieved from his role at Aberdeen in February, to save their season, appointing him along with long-time assistant Lee Sharp on a short-term deal until the end of the Premiership season. United became only the second side to go a post-split campaign without picking up a single point and were consigned to relegation after a 3–2 loss away at Motherwell on the final day.

=== Relegation back to the Championship and immediate Premiership return (2023–present) ===
Just before United's relegation was confirmed, Goodwin signed a 2-year deal to remain manager of United. Goodwin subsequently announced he would allow any player who wishes to leave the club to do so. United had a much changed side for their first competitive outing came in the League Cup group stage against The Spartans, who had just gained promotion from the Lowland League into the SPFL set up. The matchday squad contained only 9 players from the squad that lost to Motherwell two months prior. United suffered a shock 1–0 defeat at Ainslie Park before losing once again to Partick Thistle in their first home match in the group stage. United then went on an incredible run of form, winning 14 of their next 17 matches across all competitions without losing, so that after a 2–1 win away to Dunfermline United sat on top of the Championship, with 31 points from a possible 39.

It was not all smooth sailing for the Tangerines however, as they fell out of the Challenge Cup at the quarter-final stage to League One side Falkirk before crashing out of the Scottish Cup at the first time of asking to another League One side in Queen of the South. United suffered their first defeat of the season against high-flying Raith Rovers at Tannadice. Raith had been unbeaten in 6 consecutive matches before their victory meaning that despite only losing once United were second in the league and 5 points behind the Fife side.

Raith led United by 4 points as they met once more at Stark's Park. United once again fell victim to the Rovers - this time to an 89th minute wonder strike from Rovers' captain Scott Brown. The atmosphere at Tannadice was beginning to sour, and after a 2–0 home defeat to Airdrie jeers and boos rained from the stands at the players and manager.

United managed to regain form towards the end of the season. A goal from nearly the halfway line by Louis Moult against Inverness secured a draw to put the Tannadice side clear of Raith by 1 point. The next match was between the two title challengers and seemed likely to prove decisive in the race for promotion. United defeated Raith for the first time that season, winning 2–0 to send United 4 clear at the top of the league, a position which they would not relinquish. United all but secured the Championship title and promotion back to the Premiership with a 1–0 win over Ayr United at Tannadice in April, putting them 6 points clear of Raith with two games to spare, with United's goal difference 36 more than Rovers'. The title, and subsequent promotion, was officially confirmed after a 0–0 draw at Airdrie on 26 April 2024.

After a successful return to the Premiership, United achieved a fourth-place finish on the final day of the season with a 2–1 comeback victory against Aberdeen, securing a place in the following year's UEFA Conference League second qualifying round.

== Colours and badge ==
United's playing kit consists of tangerine shirts and black shorts, derived from the kit first used when the team played under the Dallas Tornado moniker in the United Soccer Association competition of 1967, which they were invited to participate in after their first European excursion had created many headlines in the football world. After persuasion by the wife of manager Jerry Kerr, the colour would soon be adopted as the club's own in 1969 to give the club a brighter, more modern image. The new colour was paraded for the first time in a pre-season friendly against Everton in August.

When founded as Dundee Hibernian, they had followed the example of other clubs of similar heritage by adopting the traditionally Irish colours of green shirts and white shorts. By the time the club became Dundee United in 1923, the colours had been changed to white shirts and black shorts as they sought to appeal to a wider cross-section of the community. These colours persisted in various forms up until 1969, sometimes using plain shirts, but also at various times including Celtic-style broad hoops, Queen's Park-style narrow hoops and an Airdrie-style "V" motif.

Period	Kit manufacturer	Shirt sponsor (front)	Shirt sponsor (sleeve)
1973–1976	Bukta	none	none
1976–1985	Adidas	none	none
1985–1987	Adidas	VG	none
1987–1989	Adidas	Belhaven	none
1989–1991	Asics	Belhaven	none
1991–1992	Bukta	Belhaven	none
1992–1993	Loki	Belhaven	none
1993–1994	Loki	none	none
1994–1996	Pony	Rover	none
1996–1998	Pony	Telewest	none
1998–2000	Olympic Sports	Telewest	none
2000–2003	TFG Sports	Telewest	none
2003–2006	TFG Sports	Morning, Noon and Night	none
2006–2008	Hummel	Anglian Home Improvements	none
2008–2009	Hummel	Carbrini Sportswear	none
2009–2010	Nike	Carbrini Sportswear	none
2010–2016	Nike	Calor	none
2016–2018	Nike	McEwan Fraser Legal	none
2018–2019	Nike	Utilita	none
2019–2020	Macron	Utilita	none
2020–2021	Macron	Utilita	Eden Mill
2021–2022	Macron	Eden Mill	Utilita
2022–2023	Macron	Quinn Casino	Primero Contracts
2023–2024	Erreà	Bartercard	Spaces Taylored
2024–	Erreà	Quinn Casino	Trade-Mart

The present club badge was introduced in 2022, and saw the previous lion rampant design updated in a new logo incorporating the club colours. To mark the club's centenary in 2009, a special version of the badge with an added "1909 2009 Centenary" logo was introduced for the duration of the 2009–10 season, along with additional green trim on the badge, representing Dundee Hibernian's colours.

Previously, the lion had been represented on a simpler shield design. Although this "classic" version had been used as the club crest on the cover of the matchday programme as early as 1956, it had never appeared on the players' strip prior to 1983. Since 1959, various other designs had been worn on the shirts, incorporating either the lion rampant or the letters DUFC, often on a circular badge.

The club first introduced shirt sponsorship in the 1985–86 season when future chairman Eddie Thompson's VG chain sponsored the club in the first of a two-year deal. A six-year association with Belhaven then ensued with a sponsorless 1993–94 season. Rover began a two-year deal early in time for the 1994 Scottish Cup final, sponsoring the club until the end of the 1995–96 season. Telewest took over sponsorship from 1996 for six years until Eddie Thompson's Morning, Noon and Night started sponsoring the club in 2002. This association continued until 2006 when Anglian Home Improvements began a two-year deal with an optional third year. At the same time, Ole International became the first shorts sponsors. JD Sports' Carbrini Sportswear brand sponsored the club in the 2008–09 and 2009–10 seasons. United's shirt sponsor from the 2016–17 season was McEwan Fraser Legal, before Utilita took over the sponsorship from 2018 until 2021. United's shirt sponsor was then Eden Mill, who took over before the 2021–22 season, followed by two one-year sponsorships from Quinn Casino and Bartercard. Their current shirt sponsor is Quinn Casino.

United have had a number of official kit suppliers, including Adidas, Hummel, Nike, Macron and most recently Erreà.

=== Historical kits ===
Home

c. 1909	c.1929–30	1986–87	1990–91	1993–94	1994–95	2006–07	2008–09

2009–10	2010–11	2011–12	2021-22

Alternative

1985–86	1989–91	1995–96	2002–03	2009–10	2013–14

== Stadium ==
Dundee United's home ground throughout their history has been Tannadice Park, located on Tannadice Street in the Coldside area of the city. It is situated a mere 170 yards (160 m) away from Dens Park, home of rivals Dundee; The club has only ever played one home fixture at another venue. This was a League Cup tie against Rangers in March 1947, when despite snow rendering Tannadice Park unplayable, the match was able to go ahead across the road at Dens Park.

Tannadice is currently an all-seater with a capacity of 14,223. The Main Stand, built in 1962, was the first cantilever to be constructed at a Scottish football ground. For long periods of its history, only a small proportion of the ground contained seated accommodation. In the late 1980s the ground had 2,252 seats out of a total capacity of 22,310.

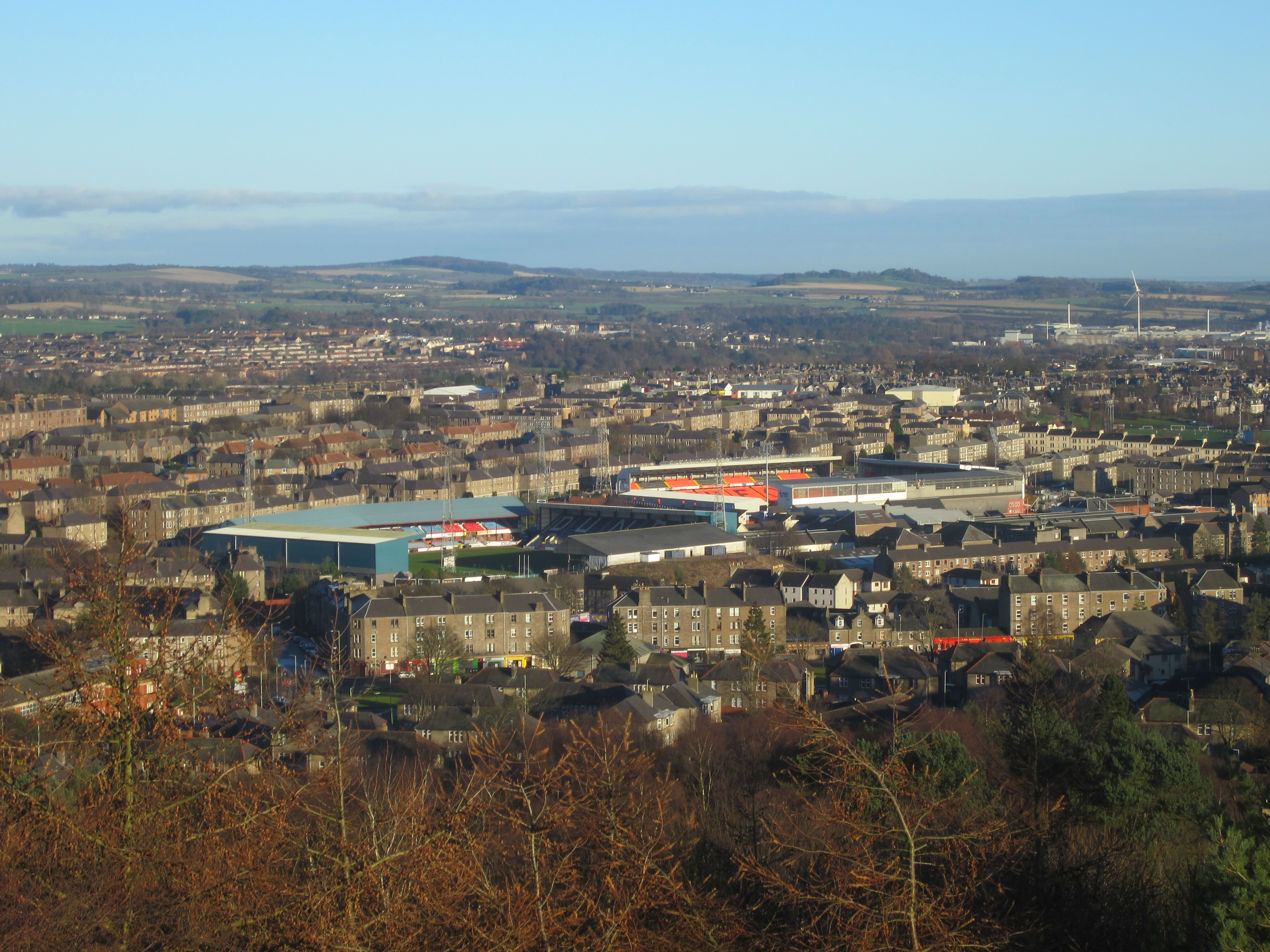
Tannadice Park is situated just 300 metres from Dens Park, home of neighbours Dundee

The comparative age and proximity of their stadiums has led to various discussions about the possibility of both Dundee clubs moving to a new, purpose-built shared stadium. The most recent proposal was put forward as part of Scotland's bid to jointly host the UEFA Euro 2008 championship, with several clubs seeking to benefit from a new stadium. With planning permission given to a proposed site at Caird Park, special dispensation was requested to proceed with the proposal, as rules at the time forbade SPL teams from groundsharing. Following Scotland's failed bid to host the tournament, the scheme was shelved, although it was resurrected in June 2008, following doubts about joint-host Ukraine's ability to stage Euro 2012, and the SFA's keenness to act as an alternative host.

In June 2024, Dundee United announced CalForth Construction as the stadium naming rights partner. As part of the agreement the stadium will be known as the CalForth Construction Arena at Tannadice Park until summer 2026.

=== League attendance ===
The table below displays Dundee United's league attendances since 2010.

The highest attendance in that period came on 30 August 2019 when United beat their city rivals Dundee 6–2 in front a 14,108 crowd, their largest league attendance since 1998. In the same season United also set their highest average attendance and highest low attendance of the decade, these records being set despite the club residing in the second tier of the Scottish Professional Football League at the time. The lowest attendance of the 2019–20 season was larger than the highest attendance of the previous year, likely due to United's strong performance.

Due to United's failure to gain promotion back to the Scottish Premiership over the previous seasons and growing mistrust of the club chairman and owner, 2018–19 saw the lowest average attendance of the decade. The lowest attendance was set the season before.

At the start of the 2020s, United's attendance figures were hampered by the COVID-19 pandemic, however the attendance slowly recovered in the period between 2020 and 2023. The club's return to the Premiership in 2024 saw an increase in attendance compared to the last season the club spent in the top flight.

The table does not include playoff attendances.

Dundee United Attendance 2010–2026
Season	Division	Tier	Place	Lowest Attendance	Highest Attendance	Average Attendance
2010–11	Scottish Premier League	1	4th	4,918	11,790	7,389
2011–12	Scottish Premier League	1	4th	5,232	11,741	7,496
2012–13	Scottish Premier League	1	6th	5,117	13,538	7,547
2013–14	Scottish Premiership	1	4th	5,784	12,601	7,548
2014–15	Scottish Premiership	1	5th	5,243	12,964	8,114
2015–16	Scottish Premiership	1	12th	4,689	11,835	7,969
2016–17	Scottish Championship	2	3rd	4,661	10,925	6,584
2017–18	Scottish Championship	2	3rd	3,620	6,936	5,505
2018–19	Scottish Championship	2	2nd	4,201	6,532	5,079
2019–20	Scottish Championship	2	1st	6,929	14,108	8,496
2020–21	Scottish Premiership	1	9th	0*	0*	0*
2021–22	Scottish Premiership	1	4th	0*	12,806	6,972
2022–23	Scottish Premiership	1	12th	7,430	12,599	8,625
2023–24	Scottish Championship	2	1st	7,000	11,802	8,408
2024–25	Scottish Premiership	1	4th	8,349	14,268	11,043
2025–26	Scottish Premiership	1	7th	8,147	13,495	10,414

*Spectators were not allowed to attend matches due to the COVID-19 pandemic.

== Rivalries ==
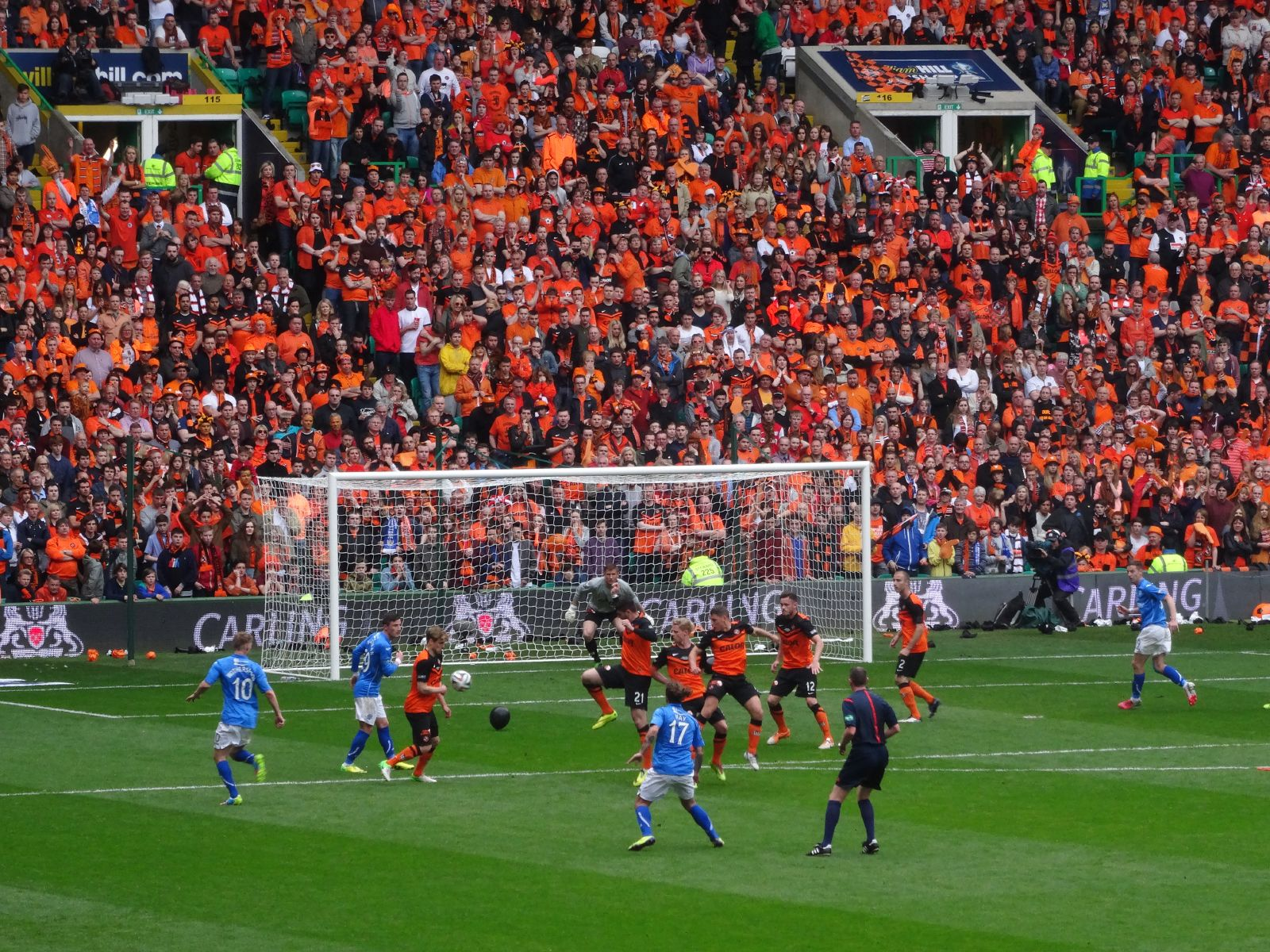
Dundee United faced rivals St Johnstone in the 2014 Scottish Cup final

Dundee United's traditional rivals are Dundee, with whom they compete in the Dundee derby. A unique element of the rivalry lies in the fact that the clubs' stadiums are located within 100 yards of one another.

In spite of their rivalry, the two sides previously contemplated ground-sharing as part of the SFA's unsuccessful bid to host Euro 2008. Perhaps the most notable meeting was the final game of the 1982–83 Premier Division season, where if United were victors at Dens Park, they would clinch the top flight title; United were victorious thanks to an Eamonn Bannon winner. Another significant match was that of the 1980 Scottish League Cup final, in which United ran out 3–0 winners on their rivals' home turf.

Another intense ongoing rivalry is that of the New Firm derby between United and North-East rivals Aberdeen. The match itself became one of fierce competition due to the domestic and European success the two sides achieved in the late 1970s and 1980s under the stewardship of United's Jim McLean and Aberdeen's Alex Ferguson. There has been one major cup final between the two sides; the 1979–80 Scottish League Cup final in which United ran out the victors, winning the club's first major trophy.

A further local, but less intense rivalry, is that of the Tayside derby which United share with Perth side St Johnstone. United fans generally consider this rivalry to be inferior compared with the Dundee derby or New Firm. However, the most significant match between the two clubs was that of the 2014 Scottish Cup final, which saw a United team including the likes of Stuart Armstrong and now-Champions League winner Andy Robertson fail to conclude an otherwise successful season with silverware, losing 2–0 to 'the Saints', allowing St Johnstone to win their first ever major trophy.

The rivalry between Dundee United and Rangers has become a significant fixture in Scottish football in recent times, marked by competitive intensity and off-the-pitch drama. It gained prominence in the 1980s and 1990s when Dundee United, under Jim McLean, challenged the dominance of Rangers and other Glasgow clubs. Key moments, such as Dundee United's 1994 Scottish Cup final victory over Rangers, and various contentious league matches, heightened tensions.

The major spark for the rivalry between the two clubs was when Dundee United played a significant role in the relegation saga of Rangers during the 2011–12 season, marked by Rangers' financial turmoil. After Rangers entered administration and received a 10-point deduction, Dundee United delivered crucial defeats that added to Rangers' on-field struggles.

== Current squad ==
=== First-team squad ===
As of 1 October 2026

Note: Flags indicate national team as defined under FIFA eligibility rules; some limited exceptions apply. Players may hold more than one non-FIFA nationality.

No.	Pos.	Nation	Player
1	GK	ENG	Jack Walton
3	DF	NED	Bert Esselink
4	DF	MDA	Iurie Iovu
6	DF	SCO	Ross Graham (captain)
7	FW	ALG	Mehdi Merghem
8	MF	GBS	Panutche Camará
9	FW	AUS	Zac Sapsford
10	MF	SCO	Dylan Tait (vice-captain)
11	DF	IRL	Will Ferry
12	MF	GHA	Emmanuel Agyei
14	MF	IRQ	Zidane Iqbal
15	FW	AUS	Lachlan Rose
16	MF	SCO	Lyall Cameron (on loan from Rangers)

No.	Pos.	Nation	Player
18	DF	NIR	Michael Forbes
19	DF	ROU	Kevin Ciubotaru
20	DF	IRL	Neil Farrugia
21	FW	NZL	Jesse Randall
22	DF	IRQ	Dario Naamo
23	DF	AUS	Joshua Rawlins
26	MF	CIV	Abdoulaye Yoro (on loan from İstanbul Başakşehir)
30	GK	GHA	Jordan Amissah
45	MF	SCO	Cohen Leiper
60	FW	ITA	Lorenzo Sassetti
77	FW	AUS	Daniel Bennie (on loan from Queens Park Rangers)
93	FW	TOG	Idjessi Metsoko (on loan from Viktoria Plzeň)

=== On loan ===
Note: Flags indicate national team as defined under FIFA eligibility rules; some limited exceptions apply. Players may hold more than one non-FIFA nationality.

No.	Pos.	Nation	Player
29	MF	SCO	Miller Thomson (on loan at Stenhousemuir)
31	GK	SCO	Ruairidh Adams (on loan at Airdrieonians)
34	FW	SCO	Owen Stirton (on loan at Ayr United)
35	DF	ENG	Charlie Dewar (on loan at Arbroath)
36	DF	SCO	Matthew Mudie (on loan at The Spartans)
37	DF	SCO	Samuel Cleall-Harding (on loan at Dunfermline Athletic)
38	MF	SCO	Keir Gilligan (co-operation loan with Clyde)
39	MF	SCO	Scott Constable (on loan at Arbroath)

No.	Pos.	Nation	Player
40	MF	SCO	Jack Anderson (co-operation loan with Clyde)
48	MF	SCO	Jamie Forrest (co-operation loan with Clyde)
—	DF	SCO	Marcus Buchanan (on loan at Jeanfield Swifts)
—	DF	SCO	Brodie Lee (on loan at Lochee United)
—	MF	DEN	Julius Eskesen (on loan at KuPS)
—	MF	POL	Emil Franczak (on loan at Jeanfield Swifts)
—	MF	ENG	Joene Mampovisa (on loan at Carnoustie Panmure)

== Staff ==
Position	Name
Manager	Jim Goodwin
Assistant manager	Lee Sharp
First team coach	Dave Bowman
Goalkeeping coach	Paul Mathers
Head of recruitment	Ross Goodwin
Academy director	Scott Allison
Head of academy coaching	Alec Cleland
Head of player pathway and loans	Brian Grant
Head of player development	Andy Payne
Head of player care	Niall Nicolson
Head of analysis	Aidan Croll
Head of medical	Marcin Szostak
Physiotherapist	Kevin Milne
Sports scientist	Ewan Anderson
Strength and conditioning coach	Allan Gartshore
Kit coordinator	Andy Bryan

== Managers ==
The first manager of Dundee Hibernian in 1909 was Pat Reilly. The club's longest serving and most successful manager, Jim McLean, held the position from 1971 to 1993, winning three major honours – the Scottish Premier Division title in 1982–83 and the Scottish League Cup twice in 1979 and 1980. Two Dundee United managers have won the Scottish Cup – Ivan Golac in 1994 and Peter Houston in 2010.

Name	Period
(Scotland) Pat Reilly	1909–1915
(Scotland) Pat Reilly	1917–1922
(England) Bert Dainty	1915–1917
(Scotland) Peter O'Rourke	1922–1923
(Scotland) Jimmy Brownlie	1923–1931
(Scotland) Jimmy Brownlie	1934–1936
(Scotland) Willie Reid	1931–1934
(Scotland) George Greig	1936–1938
(Scotland) Jimmy Brownlie (Northern Ireland) Sam Irving	1938–1939
(Scotland) Bobby McKay	1939
(Scotland) Jimmy Allan	1939–1942
(Scotland) Jimmy Littlejohn	1942–1944
(Scotland) Charlie McGillivray	1944–1945
(Scotland) Willie MacFadyen	1945–1954
(England) Reg Smith	1954–1957
(Scotland) Ally Gallacher	1957
(Scotland) Tommy Gray	1957–1958
(Scotland) Andy McCall	1958–1959
(Scotland) Jerry Kerr	1959–1971
(Scotland) Jim McLean	1971–1993

Name	Period
(Federal Republic of Yugoslavia) Ivan Golac	1993–1995
(Scotland) Billy Kirkwood	1995–1996
(Scotland) Tommy McLean	1996–1998
(Scotland) Paul Sturrock	1998–2000
(Scotland) Alex Smith	2000–2002
(Scotland) Paul Hegarty	2002–2003
(Scotland) Ian McCall	2003–2005
(Scotland) Gordon Chisholm	2005–2006
(Scotland) Craig Brewster	2006
(Scotland) Craig Levein	2006–2009
(Scotland) Peter Houston	2009–2013
(Scotland) Jackie McNamara	2013–2015
(Finland) Mixu Paatelainen	2015–2016
(Scotland) Ray McKinnon	2016–2017
(Hungary) Csaba László	2017–2018
(Scotland) Robbie Neilson	2018–2020
(Scotland) Micky Mellon	2020–2021
(Scotland) Tam Courts	2021–2022
(Scotland) Jack Ross	2022
(Scotland) Liam Fox	2022–2023
(Republic of Ireland) Jim Goodwin	2023–

== Noted players ==
=== International players ===
This is a list of former and current players who have played at full international level while with the club. They are ordered by nationality and year of United debut below. Additionally, two goalkeepers – Pat Onstad (Canada) and Kémoko Camara (Guinea) – were both capped while at Tannadice yet never played a first-team game for United.

Australia

- 2014 Curtis Good
- 2015 Ryan McGowan
- 2022 Aziz Behich

Bonaire

- 2024 Jort van der Sande

Canada

- 1998 Jason de Vos
- 2004 Lars Hirschfeld

Estonia

- 2015 Henri Anier

Finland

- 1987 Mixu Paatelainen
- 2021 Ilmari Niskanen

Ghana

- 2007 Prince Buaben
- 2026 Emmanuel Agyei

Guinea-Bissau

- 2025 Panutche Camará

Iceland

- 1997 Siggi Jónsson
- 2002 Arnar Gunnlaugsson

Iraq

- 2026 Dario Naamo
- 2026 Zidane Iqbal

Israel

- 1999 Jan Talesnikov

Japan

- 2016 Eiji Kawashima

Kenya

- 2024 Richard Odada

Latvia

- 2010 Pāvels Mihadjuks

Moldova

- 2026 Iurie Iovu

New Zealand

- 2026 Jesse Randall

Northern Ireland

- 1989 Michael O'Neill
- 1998 Iain Jenkins
- 1998 Darren Patterson
- 2000 Danny Griffin
- 2008 Warren Feeney
- 2013 Paul Paton
- 2015 Billy Mckay
- 2021 Trevor Carson

North Macedonia

- 2024 David Babunski
- 2024 Kristijan Trapanovski

Republic of Ireland

- 2022 Jamie McGrath
- 2026 Will Ferry

Scotland

- 1973 David Narey
- 1974 Paul Hegarty
- 1974 Paul Sturrock
- 1976 Davie Dodds
- 1979 Eamonn Bannon
- 1981 Richard Gough
- 1981 Maurice Malpas
- 1985 Kevin Gallacher
- 1986 Dave Bowman
- 1986 Jim McInally
- 1986 Billy McKinlay
- 1990 Duncan Ferguson
- 1997 Steven Thompson
- 1998 Billy Dodds
- 2000 Paul Gallacher
- 2000 Charlie Miller
- 2003 Barry Robson
- 2005 Garry Kenneth
- 2005 Lee Miller
- 2005 David Goodwillie
- 2006 Craig Conway
- 2008 Scott Robertson
- 2009 Andy Webster
- 2011 Gary Mackay-Steven
- 2013 Andrew Robertson
- 2019 Lawrence Shankland

Senegal

- 2007 Morgaro Gomis

Slovakia

- 2010 Dušan Perniš
- 2018 Pavol Šafranko

Sweden

- 1964 Örjan Persson
- 1965 Lennart Wing

Trinidad and Tobago

- 1993 Jerren Nixon
- 2003 Collin Samuel
- 2003 Jason Scotland

Wales

- 2021 Dylan Levitt

(Socialist Federal Republic of Yugoslavia) Yugoslavia

- 1988 Miodrag Krivokapić

=== Hall of Fame ===
The club launched its official Hall of Fame in 2008, with seven inaugural members. A further six players were inducted in January 2009, and seven more in January 2010. Since then six players have been inducted each year.

2008:

- (Scotland) Jimmy Briggs
- (Denmark) Finn Døssing
- (Scotland) Dennis Gillespie
- (Scotland) Paul Hegarty
- (Scotland) Maurice Malpas
- (Scotland) David Narey
- (Scotland) Doug Smith

2009:

- (Scotland) Eamonn Bannon
- (Scotland) Johnny Coyle
- (Scotland) Hamish McAlpine
- (Scotland) Peter McKay
- (Scotland) Ralph Milne
- (Scotland) Andy Rolland

2010:

- (Scotland) Dave Bowman
- (Scotland) John Clark
- (Scotland) Davie Dodds
- (Scotland) Stewart Fraser
- (Scotland) Billy Hainey
- (Scotland) Ian Mitchell
- (Scotland) Paul Sturrock

2011:

- (Scotland) Kenny Cameron
- (Scotland) John Holt
- (Scotland) Duncan Hutchison
- (Scotland) Frank Kopel
- (Norway) Erik Pedersen
- (Sweden) Lennart Wing

2012:

- (Scotland) Arthur Milne
- (Scotland) Jim Irvine
- (Scotland) Billy Kirkwood
- (Scotland) Billy Thomson
- (Scotland) Brian Welsh
- (Sweden) Kjell Olofsson

2013:

- (Scotland) Johnny Hart
- (Scotland) Donald Mackay
- (Sweden) Örjan Persson
- (Scotland) George Fleming
- (Scotland) John Reilly
- (Scotland) Alan Main

2014:

- (Scotland) Billy McKinlay
- (Scotland) Willie Pettigrew
- (Scotland) Graeme Payne
- (Scotland) Lee Wilkie
- (Scotland) Tommy Millar
- (Scotland) Kevin Gallacher

2015:

- (Scotland) Derek Stark
- (Scotland) Jim McInally
- (Finland) Mixu Paatelainen
- (Scotland) Christian Dailly
- (Scotland) Pat Reilly
- (Scotland) Jim McLean

2016:

- (New Zealand) Sandy Davie
- (Scotland) Jerry Kerr
- (Scotland) Andy McLaren
- (Scotland) Frank Quinn
- (Scotland) Richard Gough
- (Republic of Ireland) Seán Dillon

2017:

- (Scotland) Davie Wilson
- (Scotland) Iain Phillip
- (Netherlands) Guido van de Kamp
- (Scotland) Ian Redford

2019:

- (Scotland) Craig Brewster
- (Socialist Federal Republic of Yugoslavia) Ivan Golac
- (Scotland) Jimmy Brownlie
- (Scotland) Tommy Neilson

== Honours ==
=== League ===
Dundee United's first trophy came in 1925, when they won the 1924–25 Division Two championship. After two seasons in the top tier, they were relegated, but they won the Division Two title for a second time in 1928–29. Immediate relegation followed and the club finished runners-up in 1931–32. Another runners-up spot was claimed in 1959–60, in manager Jerry Kerr's first season, and from then club remained in the top division for the next 35-years. Under Jim McLean's management, the club won the Premier Division title for the only time, in 1982–83, resulting in European Cup football the following season. The title win was United's last major league success, although they finished runners-up in the First Division in 1995–96 (winning promotion via the play-offs) and in third place in their first season back in the Premier Division. A third lower league title was added in 2019–20, after the curtailment of the campaign with United clear in 1st place and subsequently a fourth lower league title was added in 2023–24, as United won the Championship title.

- Scottish Premiership:
  - Winners: 1982–83
- Scottish Championship:
  - Winners: 1924–25, 1928–29, 2019–20, 2023–24

=== Cups ===
The club had to wait several decades before their first realistic chance at cup silverware, when they began the first of a six-game losing streak of Scottish Cup final appearances in 1974, losing 3–0 to Celtic. Towards the end of the 1970s, things began to change, with three successive appearances in the League Cup final. United won their first major trophy with a 3–0 replay victory over Aberdeen in the 1979–80 Scottish League Cup final. The club reached both cup finals in the following season; while they retained the League Cup by winning 3–0 against rivals Dundee, United lost out again in the Scottish Cup with a replay defeat to Rangers. United reached a third consecutive League Cup final in 1981–82, but failed to make it a hat-trick of wins as they lost 2–1 to Rangers.

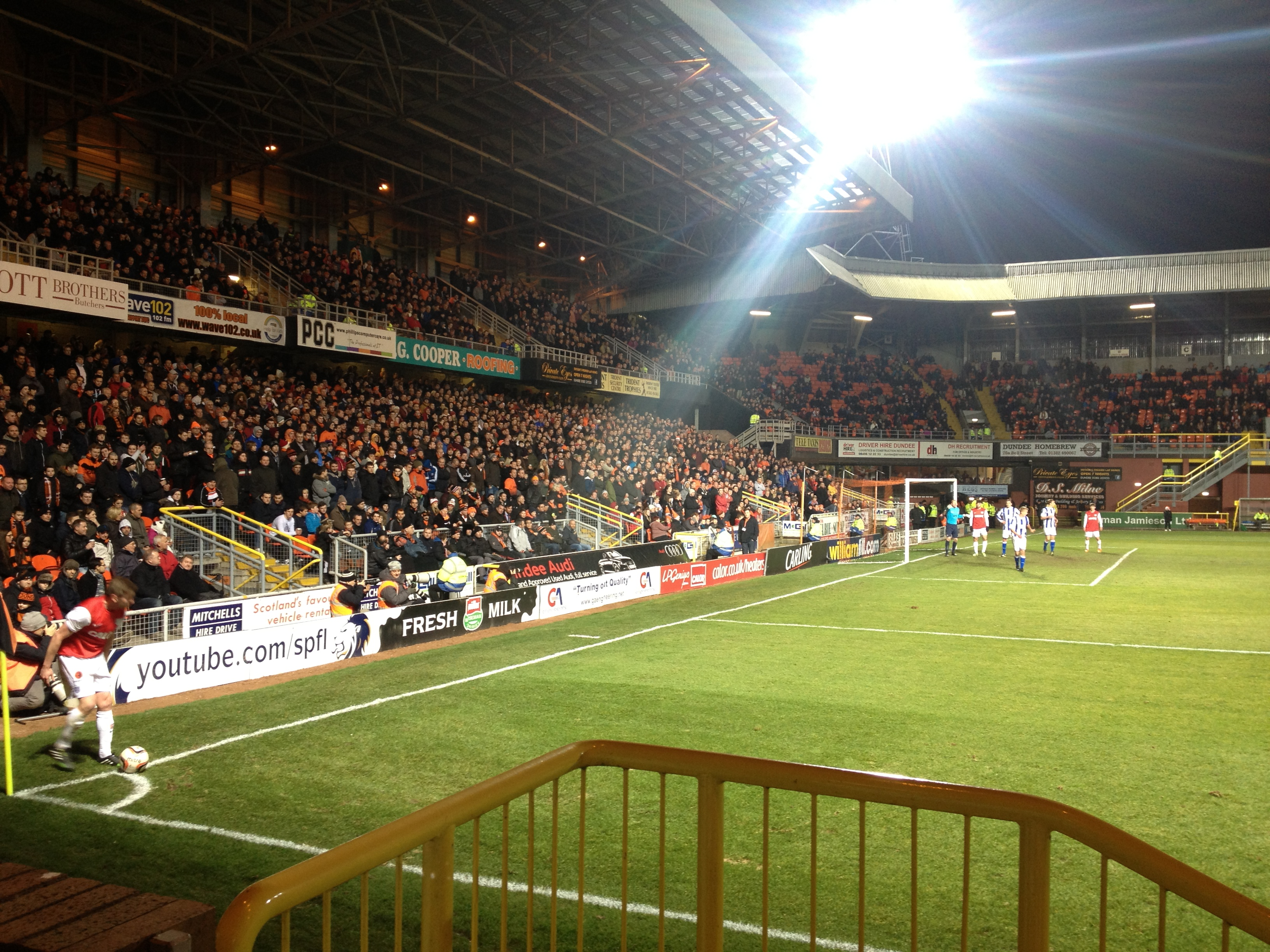
United (in red) versus Kilmarnock at Tannadice in the 2013–14 Scottish Cup.

United suffered the agony of reaching three out of four Scottish Cup finals in the mid-1980s, only to lose them all by a single goal. First came a 2–1 defeat to Celtic in 1984–85, compounded by a 1–0 League Cup final loss to Rangers in the same season; then a 1–0 defeat in extra time to St Mirren in 1986–87; and finally, a last-minute 2–1 loss against Celtic the following year, despite being a goal ahead. A three-year gap ensued before the 1990–91 Scottish Cup final, which pitted Jim McLean against his brother Tommy, at Motherwell. The final was won 4–3 by 'Well, with United again losing in extra time. The sixth Cup Final loss was also the club's fifth final appearance in eleven years.

These defeats in cup finals at Hampden Park led to the Scottish football media claiming that United suffered from a Hampden hoodoo, as they had failed to win ten cup finals played at the ground between 1974 and 1991. When the club reached the 1994 Scottish Cup final, manager Ivan Golac dismissed talk of the hoodoo, even though opponents Rangers were strong favourites to complete a 2nd consecutive domestic treble in the 1993–94 season. United broke the supposed hoodoo and won the Scottish Cup for the first time when Craig Brewster's goal gave them a 1–0 win.

Eleven years passed until the next Scottish Cup final appearance, when United lost 1–0 to Celtic in 2005. Sandwiched in the middle of these appearances was a defeat on penalties to Stenhousemuir in the 1995 Scottish Challenge Cup final (when United failed to concede a goal in the whole competition) and a 3–0 defeat to Celtic in the 1997 Scottish League Cup final. United then lost the 2008 Scottish League Cup final on penalties to Rangers after the match had finished 2–2 after extra time. Dundee United won their next major trophy in 2010, under the guidance of manager Peter Houston, when First Division side Ross County were defeated 3–0 in the 2010 Scottish Cup final. David Goodwillie scored the first goal and Craig Conway scored the second and third goals in front of 28,000 Dundee United fans at Hampden Park.

United's 10th appearance in the Scottish Cup final came in 2014, but the team lost 2–0 to St Johnstone at Celtic Park. The Tangerines reached the League Cup final the following year, but lost to Celtic in the 2015 Scottish League Cup final.

Two years later, after the club's relegation from the Scottish Premiership, they faced St Mirren in the 2017 Scottish Challenge Cup final. United won the game 2–1, marking the club's first silverware since 2010.

- Scottish Cup:
  - Winners: 1993–94, 2009–10
  - Runners-up (8): 1973–74, 1980–81, 1984–85, 1986–87, 1987–88, 1990–91, 2004–05, 2013–14
- Scottish League Cup:
  - Winners: 1979–80, 1980–81
  - Runners-up (5): 1981–82, 1984–85, 1997–98, 2007–08, 2014–15
- Scottish Challenge Cup:
  - Winners: 2016–17
  - Runners-up: 1995–96
- Summer Cup:
  - Runners-up: 1964–65
- Scottish Qualifying Cup:
  - Runners-up: 1913–14

=== Europe ===
The club's first experience of Europe came in 1966–67 season when, helped by a clutch of Scandinavian players, United defeated Inter-Cities Fairs Cup holders FC Barcelona both home and away. Although Juventus proved too strong in the next round with a 3–1 aggregate victory, United made headlines and were asked to compete as Dallas Tornado in the United Soccer Association league in North America during the summer of 1967.

In 1981–82 they began a period in which they were competitive in European competition. In a six-year spell they reached one UEFA final, another semi-final and two quarter finals. After their only Premier League title in 1983, the team reached the resulting semi-final of the European Cup in 1984, losing 3–2 on aggregate to Roma with the match referee Michel Vautrot later being found to have been bribed £50,000 by the Roma president Dino Viola. The match was never replayed despite UEFA banning the Roma President due to this match.

In 1987, the club went one better, reaching the final of the UEFA Cup beating FC Barcelona in both the home and away fixtures en route to the final. Despite the 2–1 aggregate loss to IFK Gothenburg in the final, the club won the first-ever FIFA Fair Play Award for their supporters' sporting behaviour after the final defeat. They were also awarded the BBC Scotland Sportscene Team of the Year for that seasons exploits in Europe.

Dundee United are famous for having a 100% record against FC Barcelona in European fixtures (4 wins out of 4 matches), and remain the only British team to have achieved this feat.

- UEFA Cup / Europa League:
  - Runners-up: 1986–87
- European Cup / Champions League:
  - Semi-finalists: 1983–84

=== Other ===
- Forfarshire Cup:
  - Winners (21): 1910–11, 1914–15, 1919–20, 1928–29, 1929–30, 1947–48, 1950–51, 1953–54, 1960–61, 1962–63, 1964–65, 1968–69, 1971–72, 1974–75, 1975–76, 1976–77, 1979–80, 1984–85, 1986–87, 1987–88, 2004–05
  - Runners-up (12)
- Scottish War Emergency Cup:
  - Runners-up: 1940
- Evening Telegraph Challenge Cup:
  - Winners: 2005
  - Runners-up: 2006

=== Youths ===
- SFL Youth League
  - Winners: 1996–97
  - Runners-up: 1997–98, 1999–00
- Scottish Youth Cup
  - Winners: 1990, 1991
  - Runners-up: 1989, 1998

== See also ==
- The term "Dundee" or "Dundee United" as used as slang in Nigeria.
