= Finn Døssing =

Danish footballer (1941–2022)

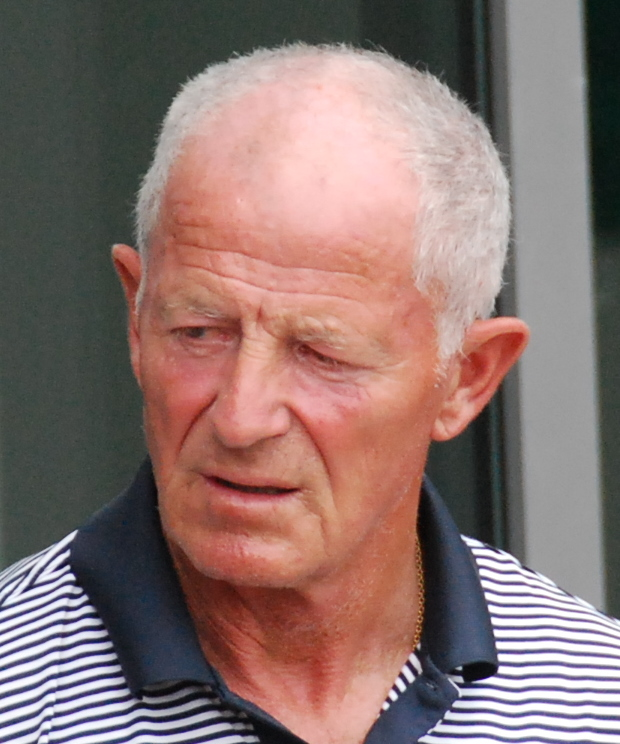
- Døssing in 2011

Personal information
- Full name: Finn Døssing Jensen
- Date of birth: 27 April 1941
- Place of birth: Viborg, Denmark
- Date of death: 24 June 2022 (aged 81)
- Position: Centre forward

Senior career*
Years	Team	Apps	(Gls)
1958–1964	Viborg FF	349	
1964–1968	Dundee United	86	(60)
1967	→ Dallas Tornado (loan)	10	(3)
1968	Aalborg BK	24	(7)

International career
1963	Denmark U21	1	(1)
- * Club domestic league appearances and goals

Finn Døssing Jensen (27 April 1941 – 24 June 2022) was a Danish footballer who played as a centre forward. He began his career with Viborg FF and represented the Denmark under-21 team before joining Dundee United in 1964. He scored 76 goals in 115 appearances for the Scottish club before returning to Denmark to finish his career with Aalborg BK. He was inducted into the Dundee United Hall of Fame in 2008.

== Career ==
=== Club ===
Døssing was born in Viborg, Jutland and started his career with his hometown club Viborg FF in 1958, aged 17. With the help of Jack Johnson, a former manager of B 1913, Døssing got in contact with Dundee United. He played a trial match for the club, scoring all four goals in a 4–0 win. In December 1964, he signed his first professional contract, and moved to Dundee United under manager Jerry Kerr.

United had made a poor start to the 1964–65 First Division season and appeared to be heading towards relegation until Kerr took a gamble in bringing some of the first foreigners to play in Scotland. Døssing scored 21 goals in only 19 matches during his first season, helping the club move into mid-table security that year. From December 1964 to March 1965, he scored in 13 consecutive league games.

The following season, Døssing scored 25 goals, helping United to finish in fifth place in the league and qualify for European competition for the first time. Injury would limit Døssing's involvement in United's 1966–67 Fairs Cup campaign, keeping him out of both victories against FC Barcelona and the first game against Juventus. In the home leg against the Italian club, he returned to score the game’s only goal.

Døssing left Dundee United after three years, having scored 76 goals in 115 appearances, returning to Denmark to play for Aalborg BK. According to the Danish rules of amateurism, Døssing was dictated a half year quarantine before he was eligible to play in the Danish championship. He entered an AaB team which had not won in their first eight matches, and helped the club finish in mid-table. Days before the opening of the 1969 season, Døssing decided to leave AaB, moving back to Viborg to run his own gents’ outfitters business.

=== International ===
Døssing played a number of Danish national youth team matches, and made his debut for the Denmark under-21 national team in September 1963. He never played a senior national team match; turning professional with Dundee United effectively banned him from the strictly amateur Denmark national team.

== Later life and death ==
Døssing retained an association with Dundee United by his membership of the ArabTRUST (the club's supporters trust), and one of the Federation of Dundee United Supporters' Clubs, in Argyll, was named after him. When Dundee United launched a club Hall of Fame in 2008, he was one of the first players to be inducted.

Døssing died on 24 June 2022, at the age of 81.
