= Eden Mill St Andrews distillery =

Distillery in Guardbridge, Scotland

Coordinates: 56°21′50″N 2°53′31″W

Eden Mill St Andrews
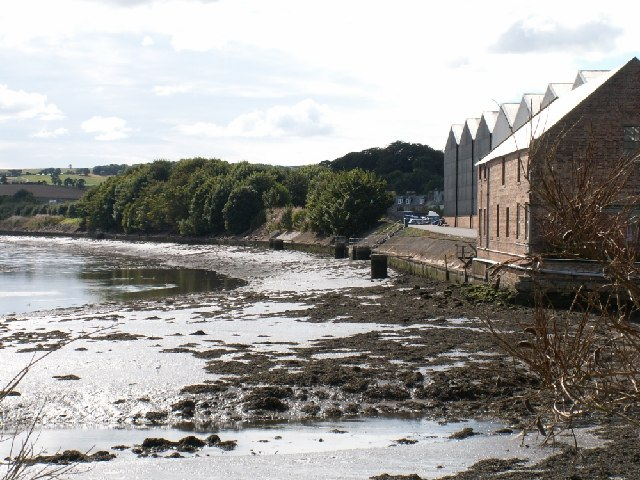
- Location: Guardbridge, Fife
- Owner: Inverleith LLP
- Founded: 2012
- Status: Active
- Capacity: 0.06 MLPA

Eden Mill St Andrews are independent distillers based in Guardbridge, Scotland, about 3 miles (5km) north-west of St Andrews. The distillery is located on a 38-acre (15 ha) site, known as the Eden Campus, owned by the University of St Andrews. Brewing began in 2012.

Eden Mill became Scotland's first combined distillery and brewery in 2014 when they started distilling Scotch whisky and gin in 2014. Eden Mill is no longer classed as a brewery as beer production ceased in 2018 but the company continues to distill and sell both gin and whisky.

== History ==
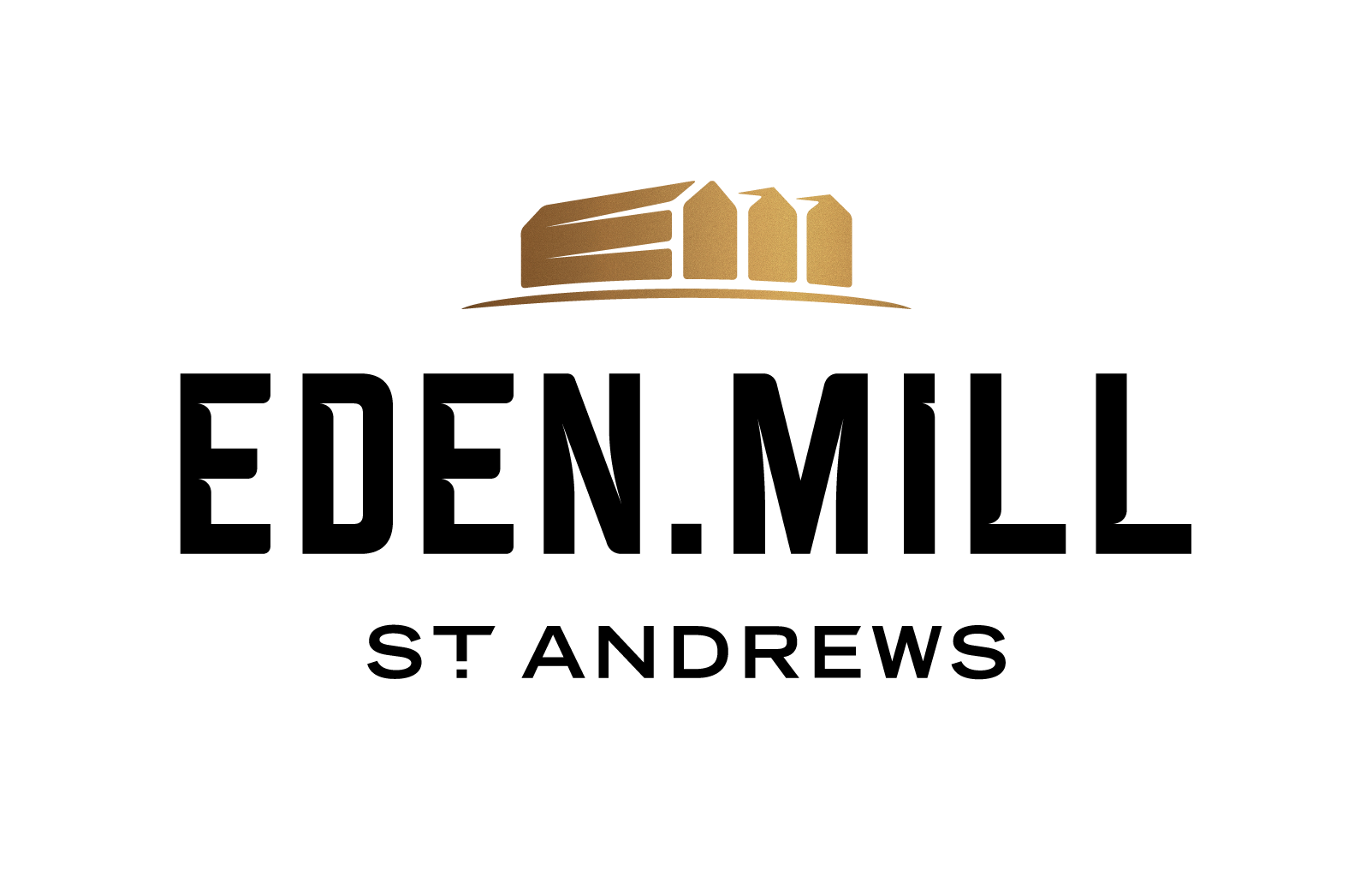
Logo

The site of the distillery is on the banks of the Eden Estuary and has had a long history of distilling and brewing. For most of the 19th century, the Haig Family operated a whisky distillery here. In 1860, they started distilling whisky elsewhere in Fife and the site subsequently became paper mill which operated for several decades before closing in 2008.

Eden Mill St Andrews was founded in 2012. In 2021, the company was purchased by Inverleith LLP who are now the majority shareholder. The primary objective behind this sale was to provide sufficient investment to complete the construction of a new distillery on the same site as the original one and to allow expansion of the business further afield in the UK, as well as in overseas markets such as the US.

In December 2025, it was announced Eden Mill had been acquired by the Scottish entrepreneur, Tony Banks through his investment firm, Ruby Capital for an undisclosed amount. The acquisition includes the distillery’s leasehold interest, brand, stock, equipment and intellectual property.

== Expansion ==
In 2022, Eden Mill received planning permission for their new distillery. Construction commenced in 2023 and it is due to become operational early in 2025. The new distillery will produce just over one million litres of new-make spirit per year, providing a significant increase in capacity compared to the original site. Distillation of both gin and whisky will continue in the new premises.

== Beers ==
During their brewing phase, Eden Mill St Andrews produced bottled beers such as traditional ales, IPAs and craft lagers. Several of these beers were also for sale in casks. After ceasing production of their beers on site in 2018, they were produced by a third-party contracted brewer called Eden River Brew Co before beer production stopped completely in 2021.
